= List of plays adapted into feature films: A to I =

This is a list of plays that have been adapted into feature films, whose titles fall into the A–I alphabetic range. Entries are sorted alphabetically by the title of the play. The title of the play is followed by its first public performance, its playwright, the title of the film adapted from the play, the year of the film and the film's director. If a film has an alternate title based on geographical distribution, the title listed will be that of the widest distribution area. This is a dynamic list and may never be complete. It is limited to entries in which either the play or its film adaptation have an existing article on the English-language Wikipedia. It does not include films based on plays with an unknown title. See also: List of plays adapted into feature films: J to Q and List of plays adapted into feature films: R to Z.

== List of plays adapted into feature films ==
=== 0–9 ===
Play	Playwright	Film	Film director
1918 (1979)	Horton Foote	1918 (1985)	Ken Harrison
The 24th Day	Tony Piccirillo	The 24th Day (2004)	Tony Piccirillo
27 Wagons Full of Cotton (1946)	Tennessee Williams	Baby Doll (1956)	Elia Kazan
29+1	Kearen Pang	29+1 (2017)	Kearen Pang
39 East (1919)	Rachel Crothers	39 East (1920)	John S. Robertson
7 Minutes	Stefano Massini	7 Minutes (2016)	Michele Placido
77 Park Lane	Walter Hackett	77 Park Lane (1931)	Albert de Courville
77 Park Lane	Walter Hackett	77 Rue Chalgrin (1931)	Albert de Courville
77 Park Lane	Walter Hackett	Between Night and Day (1932)	Albert de Courville; Fernando Gomis
8 femmes (1958)	Robert Thomas	8 Women (2002)	François Ozon
84 Charing Cross Road (1981)	James Roose-Evans	84 Charing Cross Road (1987)	David Jones

=== A ===
Play	Playwright	Film	Film director
A che servono questi quattrini?	Armando Curcio	A che servono questi quattrini? (1942)	Esodo Pratelli
A kék róka (1917)	Ferenc Herczeg	Erotikon (1920)	Mauritz Stiller
A milliomos	Adorján Bónyi	A Man with Heart (1932)	Géza von Bolváry
Aaron Slick from Punkin Crick (1919)	Walter Ben Hare (published under the pseudonym Beale Cormack)	Aaron Slick from Punkin Crick (1952)	Claude Binyon
Abe Lincoln in Illinois (1938)	Robert E. Sherwood	Abe Lincoln in Illinois (1940)	John Cromwell
Abie's Irish Rose (1922)	Anne Nichols	Abie's Irish Rose (1928)	Victor Fleming
Abie's Irish Rose (1922)	Anne Nichols	Abie's Irish Rose (1946)	A. Edward Sutherland
Accent on Youth (1934)	Samson Raphaelson	Accent on Youth (1935)	Wesley Ruggles
Accent on Youth (1934)	Samson Raphaelson	Mr. Music (1950)	Richard Haydn
Accent on Youth (1934)	Samson Raphaelson	But Not for Me (1959)	Walter Lang
The Acquittal	Rita Weiman	The Acquittal (1923)	Clarence Brown
Across the Border (1915)	Beulah Marie Dix	Feet of Clay (1924)	Cecil B. DeMille
Across the Pacific (1900)	Charles Blaney; J. J. McCloskey	Across the Pacific (1926)	Roy Del Ruth
Adam and Eva	Guy Bolton; George Middleton	Adam and Eva (1923)	Robert G. Vignola
Adam and Eve	C. E. Munro; Louisa Parr	Queen's Evidence (1919)	James Mackay
The Adding Machine (1923)	Elmer Rice	The Adding Machine (1969)	Jerome Epstein
Addio giovinezza (1911)	Sandro Camasio; Nino Oxilia	Goodbye Youth (1918)	Augusto Genina
Addio giovinezza (1911)	Sandro Camasio; Nino Oxilia	Goodbye Youth (1927)	Augusto Genina
The Admirable Crichton (1902)	J. M. Barrie	The Admirable Crichton (1918)	G. B. Samuelson
The Admirable Crichton (1902)	J. M. Barrie	Male and Female (1919)	Cecil B. DeMille
The Admirable Crichton (1902)	J. M. Barrie	Charlemagne (1933)	Pierre Colombier
The Admirable Crichton (1902)	J. M. Barrie	We're Not Dressing (1934)	Norman Taurog
The Admirable Crichton (1902)	J. M. Barrie	The Admirable Crichton (1957)	Lewis Gilbert
The Admiral's Secret (1928)	Cyril Campion; Edward Dignon	The Admiral's Secret (1934)	Guy Newall
Admirals All (1934)	Ian Hay; Stephen King-Hall	Admirals All (1935)	Victor Hanbury
Adrien (1939)	Jean de Létraz	Adrien (1943)	Fernandel
Adrienne Lecouvreur (1849)	Ernest Legouvé; Eugène Scribe	The Faces of Love (1924)	Carmine Gallone
Adrienne Lecouvreur (1849)	Ernest Legouvé; Eugène Scribe	Dream of Love (1928)	Fred Niblo
Adrienne Lecouvreur (1849)	Ernest Legouvé; Eugène Scribe	Adrienne Lecouvreur (1938)	Marcel L'Herbier
Adrienne Lecouvreur (1849)	Ernest Legouvé; Eugène Scribe	Adriana Lecouvreur (1955)	Guido Salvini
Adventurer at the Door	Milan Begović	Adventurer at the Door (1961)	Zvonimir Bajsić
Advice from a Caterpillar	Douglas Carter Beane	Advice from a Caterpillar (1999)	Don Scardino
After All (1929)	John Van Druten	New Morals for Old (1932)	Charles Brabin
After Dark (1868)	Dion Boucicault	After Dark (1915)	Warwick Buckland
After Five	Cecil B. DeMille; William C. DeMille	After Five (1915)	Cecil B. DeMille; Oscar Apfel
After Love (1924)	Henri Duvernois; Pierre Wolff	After Love (1924)	Maurice Champreux
After Love (1924)	Henri Duvernois; Pierre Wolff	When Love Is Over (1931)	Léonce Perret
After Love (1924)	Henri Duvernois; Pierre Wolff	After Love (1959)	Maurice Tourneur
After Tomorrow (1931)	John Golden; Hugh Stanislaus Stange	After Tomorrow (1932)	Frank Borzage
Aftermath	William Addison Hervey	Aftermath (1914)	Daniel Frohman
Afterwards (1933)	Walter Hackett	Their Big Moment (1934)	James Cruze
Agnes (1908)	Gladys Rankin (under the pseudonym George Cameron)	A Million Bid (1914)	Ralph Ince
Agnes (1908)	Gladys Rankin (under the pseudonym George Cameron)	A Million Bid (1927)	Michael Curtiz
Agnes of God (1979)	John Pielmeier	Agnes of God (1985)	Norman Jewison
Ah, Wilderness! (1933)	Eugene O'Neill	Ah, Wilderness (1935)	Clarence Brown
Ah, Wilderness! (1933)	Eugene O'Neill	Summer Holiday (1948)	Rouben Mamoulian
Ai no Uzu	Daisuke Miura	Love's Whirlpool (2014)	Daisuke Miura
Alfie (1963)	Bill Naughton	Alfie (1966)	Lewis Gilbert
Alfie (1963)	Bill Naughton	Alfie (2004)	Charles Shyer
Alias the Deacon (1925, originally titled The Deacon)	John B. Hymer; Le Roy Clemens	Alias the Deacon (1927)	Edward Sloman
Alias the Deacon (1925, originally titled The Deacon)	John B. Hymer; Le Roy Clemens	Half a Sinner (1934)	Kurt Neumann
Alias the Deacon (1925, originally titled The Deacon)	John B. Hymer; Le Roy Clemens	Alias the Deacon (1940)	Christy Cabanne
Alias Jimmy Valentine (1909)	Paul Armstrong	Alias Jimmy Valentine (1920)	Edmund Mortimer; Arthur Ripley
Alias Jimmy Valentine (1909)	Paul Armstrong	Alias Jimmy Valentine (1928)	Jack Conway
Alibi (1928)	Michael Morton	Alibi (1931)	Leslie S. Hiscott
Alice Sit-by-the-Fire (1905)	J. M. Barrie	Darling, How Could You! (1951)	Mitchell Leisen
All for Mary	Harold Brocke; Kay Bannerman	All for Mary (1955)	Wendy Toye
All Good Americans	S. J. Perelman; Laura Perelman	Paris Interlude (1934)	Edwin L. Marin
All in Good Time (1963)	Bill Naughton	The Family Way (1966)	Roy Boulting
All the King's Horses (1934)	Frederick Herendeen; Edward A. Horan	All the King's Horses (1935)	Frank Tuttle
All the King's Men (1929)	Fulton Oursler	Second Wife (1930)	Russell Mack
All My Friends Are Leaving Brisbane	Stephen Vagg	All My Friends Are Leaving Brisbane (2007)	Louise Alston
All My Sons (1947)	Arthur Miller	All My Sons (1948)	Irving Reis
All-of-a-Sudden Peggy (1907)	Ernest Denny	All of a Sudden Peggy (1920)	Walter Edwards
All Other Destinations Are Cancelled (1987)	Colleen Murphy	Termini Station (1989)	Allan King
All the Rage (1997)	Keith Reddin	It's the Rage (1999)	James D. Stern
All Soul's Eve (1920)	Anne Crawford Flexner	All Soul's Eve (1921)	Chester M. Franklin
All the Way	Robert Schenkkan	All the Way (2016, TV)	Jay Roach
All the Way Home (1960)	Tad Mosel	All the Way Home (1963)	Alex Segal
Almost a Honeymoon	Walter Ellis	Almost a Honeymoon (1930)	Monty Banks
Almost a Honeymoon	Walter Ellis	The Man at Midnight (1931)	Harry Lachman
Almost a Honeymoon	Walter Ellis	Almost a Honeymoon (1938)	Norman Lee
Aloma of the South Seas	John B. Hymer; LeRoy Clemens	Aloma of the South Seas (1926)	Maurice Tourneur
Aloma of the South Seas	John B. Hymer; LeRoy Clemens	Aloma of the South Seas (1941)	Alfred Santell
Als ich wiederkam (1899)	Oskar Blumenthal; Gustaf Kadelburg	When I Came Back (1926)	Richard Oswald
Alsace (1913)	Gaston Leroux	Alsace (1916)	Henri Pouctal
Alterego	István Asztalos	One Night in Transylvania (1941)	Frigyes Bán
Amadeus (1979)	Peter Shaffer	Amadeus (1984)	Miloš Forman
The Amazing Dr. Clitterhouse	Barré Lyndon	The Amazing Dr. Clitterhouse (1938)	Anatole Litvak
The Amazons (1893)	Arthur Wing Pinero	The Amazons (1917)	Joseph Kaufman
Ambush	Arthur Richman	The Reckless Hour (1938)	John Francis Dillon
American Buffalo (1975)	David Mamet	American Buffalo (1996)	Michael Corrente
An American Citizen (1899)	Madeleine Lucette Ryley	An American Citizen (1914)	J. Searle Dawley
An American Daughter (1997)	Wendy Wasserstein	An American Daughter (2000, TV)	Sheldon Larry
An American Tragedy (1926)	Patrick Kearney	A Place in the Sun (1951)	George Stevens
Americathon	Proctor and Bergman	Americathon (1979)	Neal Israel
Amma	Sirisena Wimalaweera	Amma (1949)	Sirisena Wimalaweera
The Amorous Prawn (1959)	Anthony Kimmins	The Amorous Prawn (1962)	Anthony Kimmins
Amphitryon	Molière	Amphitryon (1935)	Reinhold Schünzel
Anastasia (1952)	Marcelle Maurette	Anastasia (1956)	Anatole Litvak
Anastasia (1952)	Marcelle Maurette	Anastasia (1997)	Don Bluth; Gary Goldman
Anatol	Arthur Schnitzler	The Affairs of Anatol (1921)	Cecil B. DeMille
Anche i bancari hanno un'anima	Italo Terzoli; Enrico Vaime	Bankers Also Have Souls (1982)	Michel Lang
And Who Will Be Clever	Alden Nash	We're Rich Again (1934)	William A. Seiter
Andre's Mother (1988)	Terrence McNally	Andre's Mother (1990, TV)	Deborah Reinisch
Androcles and the Lion (1912)	George Bernard Shaw	Androcles and the Lion (1952)	Chester Erskine
Androcles and the Lion (1912)	George Bernard Shaw	Androcles and the Lion (1967)	Joe Layton
Angel Island	Bernadine Angus	Fog Island (1937)	Terry O. Morse
Angela Is Twenty-Two (1938)	Sinclair Lewis; Fay Wray	This Is the Life (1944)	Felix E. Feist
Angelo, Tyrant of Padua (1835)	Victor Hugo	The Tyrant of Padua (1946)	Max Neufeld
Angels in America	Tony Kushner	Angels in America (2003, TV)	Mike Nichols
Angyal	Melchior Lengyel	Angel (1937)	Ernst Lubitsch
Anima allegra (1909, also known as Genio alegre)	Quintero brothers	The Cheerful Soul (1919)	Roberto Roberti
Anima nera	Giuseppe Patroni Griffi	Anima nera (1962)	Roberto Rossellini
Animal Crackers (1928)	George S. Kaufman; Morrie Ryskind	Animal Crackers (1930)	Victor Heerman
The Animal Kingdom (1932)	Philip Barry	The Animal Kingdom (1932)	Edward H. Griffith; George Cukor
The Animal Kingdom (1932)	Philip Barry	One More Tomorrow (1946)	Peter Godfrey
Anna Ascends (1920)	Harry Chapman Ford	Anna Ascends (1922)	Victor Fleming
Anna Christie (1921)	Eugene O'Neill	Anna Christie (1923)	John Griffith Wray
Anna Christie (1921)	Eugene O'Neill	Anna Christie (1930)	Clarence Brown
Anna Christie (1921)	Eugene O'Neill	Anna Christie (1930)	Jacques Feyder
Anna Liisa (1895)	Minna Canth	Anna-Liisa (1922)	Teuvo Puro
Anna Lucasta (1944)	Philip Yordan	Anna Lucasta (1949)	Irving Rapper
Anne of the Thousand Days (1948)	Maxwell Anderson	Anne of the Thousand Days (1969)	Charles Jarrott
Anne Pedersdotter (1908)	Hans Wiers-Jenssen	Day of Wrath (1943)	Carl Theodor Dreyer
The Anniversary (1966)	Bill MacIlwraith	The Anniversary (1968)	Roy Ward Baker
Anonima Fratelli Roylott (1934)	Guglielmo Giannini	The Anonymous Roylott (1936)	Raffaello Matarazzo
Another Country (1981)	Julian Mitchell	Another Country (1984)	Marek Kanievska
Another Harvest Moon	Jeremy T. Black	Another Harvest Moon (2009)	Greg Swartz
Another Language (1932)	Rose Franken	Another Language (1933)	Edward H. Griffith
Another Part of the Forest (1946)	Lillian Hellman	Another Part of the Forest (1948)	Michael Gordon
Another Scandal	Cosmo Hamilton	Another Scandal (1924)	Edward H. Griffith
Antigone (441 BC)	Sophocles	Antigone (1961)	George Tzavellas
Antigone (441 BC)	Sophocles	I cannibali (1970)	Liliana Cavani
Antigone (441 BC)	Sophocles	Antigone (2019)	Sophie Deraspe
Antony and Cleopatra (1607)	William Shakespeare	Antony and Cleopatra (1908)	J. Stuart Blackton; Charles Kent
Antony and Cleopatra (1607)	William Shakespeare	Antony and Cleopatra (1913)	Enrico Guazzoni
Antony and Cleopatra (1607)	William Shakespeare	Cleopatra (1917)	J. Gordon Edwards
Antony and Cleopatra (1607)	William Shakespeare	Antony and Cleopatra (1959)	Christopher Muir
Antony and Cleopatra (1607)	William Shakespeare	Antony and Cleopatra (1972)	Charlton Heston
Antony and Cleopatra (1607)	William Shakespeare	Antony and Cleopatra (1974)	Jon Scoffield
Antony and Cleopatra (1607)	William Shakespeare	Kannaki (2001)	Jayaraj
Antony and Cleopatra (1607)	William Shakespeare	Antony and Cleopatra (2015)	Gary Griffin
Antony and Cleopatra (1607)	William Shakespeare	Zulfiqar (2016)	Srijit Mukherji
Any Wednesday (1964)	Muriel Resnik	Any Wednesday (1966)	Robert Ellis Miller
Anything (2007)	Timothy McNeil	Anything (2017)	Timothy McNeil
Applesauce (1925)	Barry Conners	Brides Are Like That (1936)	William C. McGann
Applesauce (1925)	Barry Conners	Always a Bride (1940)	Noel M. Smith
The Arab	Edgar Selwyn	The Arab	Cecil B. DeMille
The Arab	Edgar Selwyn	The Barbarian (1933)	Sam Wood
The Architect (1996)	David Greig	The Architect (2006)	Matt Tauber
An Ardent Heart (1869)	Alexander Ostrovsky	An Ardent Heart (1953)	Gennadi Kazansky
Are You a Mason? (1901)	Leo Ditrichstein	Are You a Mason? (1915)	Thomas N. Heffron
Are You a Mason? (1901)	Leo Ditrichstein	Are You a Mason? (1934)	Henry Edwards
Aren't Men Beasts! (1936)	Vernon Sylvaine	Aren't Men Beasts! (1937)	Graham Cutts
Aren't We All? (1923)	Frederick Lonsdale	A Kiss in the Dark (1925)	Frank Tuttle
Aren't We All? (1923)	Frederick Lonsdale	Aren't We All? (1932)	Harry Lachman
The Argyle Case (1912)	Harriet Ford; Harvey J. O'Higgins	The Argyle Case (1917)	Ralph Ince
The Argyle Case (1912)	Harriet Ford; Harvey J. O'Higgins	The Argyle Case (1929)	Howard Bretherton
Aristocracy (1892)	Bronson Howard	Aristocracy (1914)	Thomas N. Heffron
Arizona	Augustus Thomas	Arizona (1913)	Augustus Thomas; Lawrence B. McGill
Arizona	Augustus Thomas	Arizona (1918)	Albert Parker
Arizona	Augustus Thomas	Arizona (1931)	George B. Seitz
Armoured Train 14-69 (1927)	Vsevolod Ivanov	Tommy (1931)	Yakov Protazanov
Arms and the Girl (1916)	Grant Stewart; Robert Baker	Arms and the Girl (1917)	Joseph Kaufman
Arms and the Man (1894)	George Bernard Shaw	Arms and the Man (1932)	Cecil Arthur Lewis
Arms and the Man (1894)	George Bernard Shaw	Arms and the Man (1958)	Franz Peter Wirth
Arsène Lupin (1908)	Francis de Croisset; Maurice Leblanc	Arsène Lupin (1916)	George Loane Tucker
Arsène Lupin (1908)	Francis de Croisset; Maurice Leblanc	Arsene Lupin (1917)	Paul Scardon
Arsène Lupin (1908)	Francis de Croisset; Maurice Leblanc	Arsène Lupin (1932)	Jack Conway
Arsenic and Old Lace (1941)	Joseph Kesselring	Arsenic and Old Lace (1944)	Frank Capra
Arsenic and Old Lace (1941)	Joseph Kesselring	Arsenic & Old Lace (1962, TV)	George Schaefer
Ärztinnen (1979)	Rolf Hochhuth	Woman Doctors (1984)	Horst Seemann
As Good As New (1930)	Thompson Buchanan	Easy to Love (1934)	William Keighley
As Husbands Go (1931)	Rachel Crothers	As Husbands Go (1934)	Hamilton MacFadden
As Is (1985)	William M. Hoffman	As Is (1986)	Michael Lindsay-Hogg
As Long as They're Happy (1953)	Vernon Sylvaine	As Long as They're Happy (1955)	J. Lee Thompson
As You Like It (1599)	William Shakespeare	As You Like It (1912)	Charles Kent; J. Stuart Blackton; James Young
As You Like It (1599)	William Shakespeare	Love in a Wood (1915)	Maurice Elvey
As You Like It (1599)	William Shakespeare	As You Like It (1936)	Paul Czinner
As You Like It (1599)	William Shakespeare	Sollu Thambi Sollu (1959)	T. V. Sundaram
As You Like It (1599)	William Shakespeare	As You Like It (1991)	Christine Edzard
As You Like It (1599)	William Shakespeare	As You Like It (2006)	Kenneth Branagh
Ashenden (1933)	Campbell Dixon	Secret Agent (1936)	Alfred Hitchcock
Ask Beccles (1927)	Cyril Campion	Ask Beccles (1933)	Redd Davis
The Assumption of Hannele (1893)	Gerhart Hauptmann	Hannele's Journey to Heaven (1922)	Urban Gad
The Assumption of Hannele (1893)	Gerhart Hauptmann	Hanneles Himmelfahrt (1934)	Thea von Harbou
Assunta Spina (1909)	Salvatore di Giacomo	Assunta Spina (1915)	Gustavo Serena
Assunta Spina (1909)	Salvatore di Giacomo	Assunta Spina (1930)	Roberto Roberti
Assunta Spina (1909)	Salvatore di Giacomo	Assunta Spina (1948)	Mario Mattoli
The Astonished Heart (1935)	Noël Coward	The Astonished Heart (1950)	Terence Fisher
At the End of the World	Ernst Klein	At the End of the World (1921)	Penrhyn Stanlaws
At War with the Army	James B. Allardice	At War with the Army (1950)	Hal Walker
Atout Coeur! (1922)	Félix Gandéra	Arlette and Love (1943)	Robert Vernay
Au petit bonheur (1945)	Marc-Gilbert Sauvajon	Happy Go Lucky (1946)	Marcel L'Herbier
The Auctioneer (1901)	Charles Klein	The Auctioneer (1927)	Alfred E. Green
August: Osage County (2007)	Tracy Letts	August: Osage County (2013)	John Wells
Auntie Mame (1956)	Jerome Lawrence; Robert E. Lee	Auntie Mame (1958)	Morton DaCosta
Auto da Compadecida (1955)	Ariano Suassuna	A Dog's Will (2000)	Guel Arraes
Autumn (1937)	Margaret Kennedy; Gregory Ratoff	That Dangerous Age (1949)	Gregory Ratoff
Autumn Crocus (1931)	Dodie Smith	Autumn Crocus (1934)	Basil Dean
Avanti! (1968)	Samuel A. Taylor	Avanti! (1972)	Billy Wilder
The Aviator (1910)	James Montgomery	The Aviator (1929)	Roy Del Ruth
The Aviator (1910)	James Montgomery	Going Wild (1930)	William A. Seiter
The Awakening of Helena Richie (1909)	Charlotte Thompson	The Awakening of Helena Richie (1916)	John W. Noble
The Awful Truth (1922)	Arthur Richman	The Awful Truth (1925)	Paul Powell
The Awful Truth (1922)	Arthur Richman	The Awful Truth (1929)	Marshall Neilan
The Awful Truth (1922)	Arthur Richman	The Awful Truth (1937)	Leo McCarey
The Awful Truth (1922)	Arthur Richman	Let's Do It Again (1953)	Alexander Hall
Az Ezredes (1914)	Ferenc Herczeg	The Colonel (1917)	Michael Curtiz

=== B ===
Play	Playwright	Film	Film director
The Baby Dance	Jane Anderson	The Baby Dance (1998, TV)	Jane Anderson
Baby Mine (1910)	Margaret Mayo	Baby Mine (1917)	John S. Robertson; Hugo Ballin
Baby Mine (1910)	Margaret Mayo	Baby Mine (1928)	Robert Z. Leonard
The Bacchae (405 BC)	Euripides	The Bacchantes (1961)	Giorgio Ferroni
The Bacchae (405 BC)	Euripides	The Bacchae (2002)	Brad Mays
The Bachelor	Clyde Fitch	A Virtuous Vamp (1919)	David Kirkland; Sidney Franklin
The Bachelor Father (1928)	Edward Childs Carpenter	The Bachelor Father (1931)	Robert Z. Leonard
Background (1950)	Warren Chetham-Strode	Background (1953)	Daniel Birt
Bad Girl (1930)	Brian Marlowe; Viña Delmar	Bad Girl (1931)	Frank Borzage
The Bad Man (1920)	Porter Emerson Browne	West of Shanghai (1937)	John Farrow
The Bad Seed (1954)	Maxwell Anderson	The Bad Seed (1956)	Mervyn LeRoy
Badger's Green (1930)	R. C. Sherriff	Badger's Green (1934)	Adrian Brunel
Badger's Green (1930)	R. C. Sherriff	Badger's Green (1949)	John Irwin
Badges	Edward Hammond; Max Marcin	The Ghost Talks (1929)	Lewis Seiler
Bagdad on the Hudson	Ward Morehouse; Jean Dalrymple	It Happened in New York (1935, musical)	Alan Crosland
Baisers perdus	André Birabeau	Lost Kisses (1945)	Mario Soffici
Balalaika (1936)	Eric Maschwitz	Balalaika (1939, musical)	Reinhold Schünzel
The Balcony	Jean Genet	The Balcony (1963)	Joseph Strick
Balkanski špijun	Dušan Kovačević	Balkan Spy (1984)	Božidar Nikolić
The Ballad of the Sad Café (1963)	Edward Albee	The Ballad of the Sad Cafe (1991)	Simon Callow
Banco (1922)	Clare Kummer; Alfred Savoir	Lost: A Wife (1925)	William C. deMille
Bang Bang You're Dead (1999)	William Mastrosimone	Bang Bang You're Dead (2002)	Guy Ferland
Bar Girls (1994)	Lauran Hoffman	Bar Girls (1994)	Marita Giovanni
Barbara Frietchie (1899)	Clyde Fitch	Barbara Frietchie (1915)	Herbert Blaché
Barbara Frietchie (1899)	Clyde Fitch	Barbara Frietchie (1924)	Lambert Hillyer
Barbarians (1906)	Maxim Gorky	Barbarians (1953, Russian)	Leonid Lukov; Konstantin Zubov
Barefoot in Athens (1951)	Maxwell Anderson	Barefoot in Athens (1966)	George Schaefer
Barefoot in the Park (1963)	Neil Simon	Barefoot in the Park (1967)	Gene Saks
The Bargain	Edward Irwin	The Bargain (1921)	Henry Edwards
The Barker (1927)	Kenyon Nicholson	The Barker (1928)	George Fitzmaurice
The Barker (1927)	Kenyon Nicholson	Hoop-La (1933)	Frank Lloyd
Barnabetta (1914)	Helen Reimensnyder Martin	Erstwhile Susan (1919)	John S. Robertson
The Barretts of Wimpole Street (1930)	Rudolf Besier	The Barretts of Wimpole Street (1934)	Sidney Franklin
The Barretts of Wimpole Street (1930)	Rudolf Besier	The Barretts of Wimpole Street (1957)	Sidney Franklin
Barrymore (1996)	William Luce	Barrymore (2011)	Érik Canuel
Barstool Words	Josh Ben Friedman	Killing Zelda Sparks (2006)	Jeff Glickman
The Barton Mystery (1916)	Walter Hackett	The Barton Mystery (1920)	Harry T. Roberts
The Barton Mystery (1916)	Walter Hackett	The Barton Mystery (1932)	Henry Edwards
The Barton Mystery (1916)	Walter Hackett	The Barton Mystery (1949)	Charles Spaak
Bashir Lazhar	Évelyne de la Chenelière	Monsieur Lazhar (2011)	Philippe Falardeau
The Bat (1920)	Mary Roberts Rinehart; Avery Hopwood	The Bat (1926)	Roland West
The Bat (1920)	Mary Roberts Rinehart; Avery Hopwood	The Bat (1959)	Crane Wilbur
The Bat (1920)	Mary Roberts Rinehart; Avery Hopwood	The Bat Whispers (1930)	Roland West
Beat the Band (1942)	George Abbott; George Marion Jr.	Beat the Band (1947)	John H. Auer
Beau Brummell (1890)	Clyde Fitch	Beau Brummel (1924)	Harry Beaumont
Beau Brummell (1890)	Clyde Fitch	Beau Brummell (1954)	Curtis Bernhardt
Beaumarchais (1950)	Sacha Guitry	Beaumarchais (1996)	Édouard Molinaro
Beautiful Thing (1993)	Jonathan Harvey	Beautiful Thing (1995)	Hettie MacDonald
Beauty and the Barge	W. W. Jacobs	Beauty and the Barge (1914)	Harold M. Shaw
Beauty and the Barge	W. W. Jacobs	Beauty and the Barge (1937)	Henry Edwards
The Beaver Coat (1893)	Gerhart Hauptmann	The Beaver Coat (1928)	Erich Schönfelder
The Beaver Coat (1893)	Gerhart Hauptmann	The Beaver Coat (1937)	Jürgen von Alten
The Beaver Coat (1893)	Gerhart Hauptmann	The Beaver Coat (1949)	Erich Engel
Becket or The Honor of God (1959)	Jean Anouilh	Becket (1964)	Peter Glenville
Becky Sharp (1899)	Langdon Mitchell	Becky Sharp (1935)	Rouben Mamoulian
Bees and Honey	H. F. Maltby	His Lordship Regrets (1938)	Maclean Rogers
Before Morning (1933)	Edna G. Riley; Edward P. Riley	Before Morning (1933)	Arthur Hoerl
Before Sunset (1932)	Gerhart Hauptmann	Before Sundown (1956)	Gottfried Reinhardt
Beggar My Neighbour (1951)	Arnold Ridley	Meet Mr. Lucifer (1953)	Anthony Pelissier
Beggar on Horseback (1924)	George S. Kaufman; Marc Connelly	Beggar on Horseback (1925)	James Cruze
Behind the Scenes (1911)	Margaret Mayo	Behind the Scenes (1914)	James Kirkwood Sr.
Behold, We Live	John Van Druten	If I Were Free (1933)	Elliott Nugent
Bei Kerzenlicht (1928)	Karl Farkas; Siegfried Geyer	By Candlelight (1933)	James Whale
Being at Home with Claude (1985)	René-Daniel Dubois	Being at Home with Claude (1992)	Jean Beaudin
Believe Me Xantippe (1913)	John Frederick Ballard	Believe Me, Xantippe (1918, silent)	Donald Crisp
Bell, Book and Candle (1950)	John Van Druten	Bell, Book and Candle (1958)	Richard Quine
Bella Donna (1912)	James Bernard Fagan	Bella Donna (1915)	Edwin S. Porter; Hugh Ford
Bella Donna (1912)	James Bernard Fagan	Bella Donna (1923)	George Fitzmaurice
The Bells (1871)	Leopold David Lewis	The Bells (1926)	James Young
The Bells (1871)	Leopold David Lewis	The Bells (1931)	Harcourt Templeman
Bellyfruit (1996)	Kerri Green; Maria Bernhard; Susannah Blinkoff; Janet Borrus	Bellyfruit (1999)	Kerri Green
Benilde ou a Virgem-Mãe (1947)	José Régio	Benilde or the Virgin Mother (1975)	Manoel de Oliveira
Bent	Martin Sherman	Bent (1997)	Sean Mathias
The Berg (1929)	Ernest Raymond	Atlantic (1929)	E. A. Dupont
The Berg (1929)	Ernest Raymond	Atlantik (1929)	E. A. Dupont
Berkeley Square (1929)	John L. Balderston	Berkeley Square (1933)	Frank Lloyd
Berkeley Square (1929)	John L. Balderston	I'll Never Forget You (1951)	Roy Ward Baker
Bernardine (1952)	Mary Chase	Bernardine (1957)	Henry Levin
Besame Mucho	Mário Prata	Besame Mucho (1987)	Francisco Ramalho Jr.
The Best Man (1960)	Gore Vidal	The Best Man (1964)	Franklin J. Schaffner
The Best Mayor, The King (1623)	Lope de Vega	The King is the Best Mayor (1974)	Rafael Gil
The Best People (1924)	David Gray; Avery Hopwood	The Best People (1925)	Sidney Olcott
The Best People (1924)	David Gray; Avery Hopwood	Fast and Loose (1930)	Fred C. Newmeyer
Betrayal (1978)	Harold Pinter	Betrayal (1983)	David Jones
Better Living (1986)	George F. Walker	Better Living (1998)	Max Mayer
The Better 'Ole (1917)	Bruce Bairnsfather; Arthur Elliot	The Romance of Old Bill (1918)	George Pearson
Between Us (2004)	Joe Hortua	Between Us (2012)	Dan Mirvish
Beyond Therapy (1981)	Christopher Durang	Beyond Therapy (1987)	Robert Altman
Bichon (1935)	Jean de Létraz; Víctor Bouchet	Bichon (1936)	Fernand Rivers
Bichon (1935)	Jean de Létraz; Víctor Bouchet	Odygdens belöning (1937)	Gideon Wahlberg
Bichon (1935)	Jean de Létraz; Víctor Bouchet	Father For a Night (1939)	Mario Bonnard
Bichon (1935)	Jean de Létraz; Víctor Bouchet	Bajó un ángel del cielo (1942)	Luis César Amadori
Bichon (1935)	Jean de Létraz; Víctor Bouchet	Bichon (1948)	René Jayet
Bichon (1935)	Jean de Létraz; Víctor Bouchet	Hurra – die Firma hat ein Kind (1956)	Hans Richter
The Big Birthday (1956)	Hugh Leonard	Broth of a Boy (1959)	George Pollock
The Big Fight (1928)	Max Marcin; Herbert Gropper	The Big Fight (1930)	Walter Lang
Big Hearted Herbert (1934)	Sophie Kerr; Anna Steese Richardson	Big Hearted Herbert (1934)	William Keighley
Big Hearted Herbert (1934)	Sophie Kerr; Anna Steese Richardson	Father Is a Prince (1940)	Noel M. Smith
The Big Knife	Clifford Odets	The Big Knife (1955)	Robert Aldrich
The Big Pond (1928)	George Middleton	The Big Pond (1930)	Hobart Henley
A Bill of Divorcement (1921)	Clemence Dane	A Bill of Divorcement (1922)	Denison Clift
A Bill of Divorcement (1921)	Clemence Dane	A Bill of Divorcement (1932)	George Cukor
A Bill of Divorcement (1921)	Clemence Dane	A Bill of Divorcement (1940)	John Farrow
Billy Bishop Goes to War (1978)	John MacLachlan Gray	Billy Bishop Goes to War (2010)	Barbara Willis Sweete
Billy Budd (1949)	Louis O. Coxe; Robert H. Chapman (1949)	Billy Budd (1962)	Peter Ustinov
Billy Liar (1960)	Keith Waterhouse; Willis Hall	Billy Liar (1963)	John Schlesinger
Biloxi Blues (1984)	Neil Simon	Biloxi Blues (1988)	Mike Nichols
Biography (1932)	S. N. Behrman	Biography of a Bachelor Girl (1935)	Edward H. Griffith
A Bird in the Nest	Alec Coppel	The Bliss of Mrs. Blossom (1968)	Joseph McGrath
The Bird of Paradise (1912)	Richard Walton Tully	Bird of Paradise (1932)	King Vidor
The Bird of Paradise (1912)	Richard Walton Tully	Bird of Paradise (1951)	Delmer Daves
Birthday Gift (1939)	Ladislas Fodor	North to Alaska (1960)	Henry Hathaway
The Birthday Party (1957)	Harold Pinter	The Birthday Party (1968)	William Friedkin
Birthday/Születésnap (1934)	Ladislaus Bus-Fekete	Heaven Can Wait (1943)	Ernst Lubitsch
The Bishop Misbehaves (1934)	Frederick J. Jackson	The Bishop Misbehaves (1935)	E. A. Dupont
Bitter Sweet (1929)	Noël Coward	Bitter Sweet (1933)	Herbert Wilcox
Bitter Sweet (1929)	Noël Coward	Bitter Sweet (1940)	W. S. Van Dyke
Black Coffee (1930)	Agatha Christie	Black Coffee (1931)	Leslie S. Hiscott
Black Coffee (1930)	Agatha Christie	The Lacquered Box (1932)	Jean Kemm
Black Girl	J. E. Franklin	Black Girl (1972)	Ossie Davis
Black Hand George	Bert Lee; R. P. Weston	The Black Hand Gang (1930)	Monty Banks
Blackbird (2005)	David Harrower	Una (2016)	Benedict Andrews
Blackbirds (1913)	Harry James Smith	Blackbirds (1915)	J. P. McGowan
Blackbirds (1913)	Harry James Smith	Blackbirds (1920)	John Francis Dillon
Blackmail (1928)	Charles Bennett	Blackmail (1929)	Alfred Hitchcock
Blackout	Gary Lennon	Drunks (1995)	Peter Cohn
Blackrock (1996)	Nick Enright	Blackrock (1997)	Steven Vidler
Bleacher Bums (1977)	Organic Theater Company	Bleacher Bums (1979, TV)	Patterson Denny; Stuart Gordon
Bleacher Bums (1977)	Organic Theater Company	Bleacher Bums (2002, TV)	Saul Rubinek
Bleak Moments (1970)	Mike Leigh	Bleak Moments (1971)	Mike Leigh
Bless You Sister	John Meehan; Robert Riskin	The Miracle Woman (1931)	Frank Capra
Blind Alley (1935)	James Warwick	Blind Alley (1939)	Charles Vidor
Blind Alley (1935)	James Warwick	The Dark Past (1948)	Rudolph Maté
The Blind Goddess (1947)	Patrick Hastings	The Blind Goddess (1948)	Harold French
Blind Spot	Kenyon Nicholson	Waterfront (1939)	Terry O. Morse
Blind Spot	Kenyon Nicholson	Taxi! (1932)	Roy Del Ruth
Blind Youth (1917)	Lou Tellegen; Willard Mack	Blind Youth (1920)	Edward Sloman
Blithe Spirit	Noël Coward	Blithe Spirit (1945)	David Lean
Blithe Spirit	Noël Coward	Blithe Spirit (2020)	Edward Hall
Blood (1995)	Tom Walmsley	Blood (2004)	Jerry Ciccoritti
The Blossoming of Kamiya Etsuko	Masataka Matsuda	The Blossoming of Kamiya Etsuko (2006)	Kazuo Kuroki
The Blue Bird (French: L'Oiseau Bleu)	Maurice Maeterlinck	The Blue Bird (1910)	
The Blue Bird (French: L'Oiseau Bleu)	Maurice Maeterlinck	The Blue Bird (1918)	Maurice Tourneur
The Blue Bird (French: L'Oiseau Bleu)	Maurice Maeterlinck	The Blue Bird (1940)	Walter Lang
The Blue Bird (French: L'Oiseau Bleu)	Maurice Maeterlinck	The Blue Bird (1970)	Vasily Livanov
The Blue Bird (French: L'Oiseau Bleu)	Maurice Maeterlinck	The Blue Bird (1976)	George Cukor
The Blue Bird (French: L'Oiseau Bleu)	Maurice Maeterlinck	Blue Bird (2011)	Gust Van Den Berghe
Blue City Slammers (1985)	Layne Coleman	Blue City Slammers (1987)	Peter Shatalow
Blue Denim (1958)	James Leo Herlihy	Blue Denim (1959)	Philip Dunne
Bodies, Rest & Motion (1986)	Roger Hedden	Bodies, Rest & Motion (1993)	Michael Steinberg
Boeing-Boeing (1960)	Marc Camoletti	Boeing Boeing (1965)	John Rich
Bohunk (1932)	Harry R. Irving	Black Fury (1935)	Michael Curtiz
Bombshell	Caroline Francke; Mack Crane	Bombshell (1933)	Victor Fleming
Bonaventure	Charlotte Hastings	Thunder on the Hill (1951)	Douglas Sirk
Bonheur, impair et passe (1964)	Françoise Sagan	Bonheur, impair et passe (1977, TV)	Roger Vadim
The Book of Charm (1925)	John A. Kirkpatrick	Boy Meets Girl (1938)	Monta Bell
Book of the Month	Basil Thomas	Please Turn Over (1959)	Gerald Thomas
The Boomerang	Victor Mapes; Winchell Smith	The Love Doctor (1929)	Melville W. Brown
Bordertown Café (1987)	Kelly Rebar	Bordertown Café (1991)	Norma Bailey
Boris Godunov	Modest Mussorgsky	Boris Godunov (1954)	Vera Stroyeva
Boris Godunov	Modest Mussorgsky	Boris Godunov (1989)	Andrzej Żuławski
Boris Godunov (1831)	Alexander Pushkin	Boris Godunov (1989)	Andrzej Żuławski
Born Yesterday	Garson Kanin	Born Yesterday (1950)	George Cukor
Born Yesterday	Garson Kanin	Born Yesterday (1956)	Garson Kanin
Born Yesterday	Garson Kanin	Born Yesterday (1993)	Luis Mandoki
The Boss (1911)	Edward Sheldon	The Boss (1915)	Emile Chautard
Boudu sauvé des eaux (1919)	René Fauchois	Boudu Saved from Drowning (1932)	Jean Renoir
Boudu sauvé des eaux (1919)	René Fauchois	Down and Out in Beverly Hills (1986)	Paul Mazursky
Boudu sauvé des eaux (1919)	René Fauchois	Boudu (2005)	Gérard Jugnot
Bound East for Cardiff	Eugene O'Neill	The Long Voyage Home (1940)	John Ford
Bourgmestre de Stilmonde (1918)	Maurice Maeterlinck	The Burgomaster of Stilemonde (1929)	George Banfield
The Boy in the Last Row	Juan Mayorga	In the House (2012)	François Ozon
The Boys in the Band	Mart Crowley	The Boys in the Band (1970)	William Friedkin
The Boys in the Band	Mart Crowley	The Boys in the Band (2020)	Joe Mantello
Boys in Brown (1940)	Reginald Beckwith	Boys in Brown (1949)	Montgomery Tully
The Boys Next Door (1988)	Tom Griffin	The Boys Next Door (1996, TV)	John Erman
Bracelets (1917)	Sewell Collins	Bracelets (1931)	Sewell Collins
Branded (1917)	Oliver D. Bailey	The Branded Woman (1920)	Albert Parker
The Brat (1917)	Maude Fulton	The Brat (1931)	John Ford
The Brat (1917)	Maude Fulton	Girl from Avenue A (1940)	Otto Brower
Breach of Marriage	Dan Sutherland	A Question of Adultery(1958)	Don Chaffey
Breaker Morant: A Play in Two Acts	Kenneth G. Ross	Breaker Morant (1980)	Bruce Beresford
The Breaking of the Drought (1902)	Bland Holt	The Breaking of the Drought (1920)	Franklyn Barrett
Breaking Up (1990)	Michael Cristofer	Breaking Up (1997)	Robert Greenwald
Breath of Spring	Peter Coke	Make Mine Mink 1960)	Robert Asher
The Breed of the Treshams	Evelyn Greenleaf Sutherland; Beulah Marie Dix	The Breed of the Treshams (1920)	Kenelm Foss
Brewster's Millions (1906)	Winchell Smith; Byron Ongley	Brewster's Millions (1914)	Oscar Apfel; Cecil B. DeMille
Brewster's Millions (1906)	Winchell Smith; Byron Ongley	Brewster's Millions (1921)	Joseph Henabery
Brewster's Millions (1906)	Winchell Smith; Byron Ongley	Miss Brewster's Millions (1926)	Clarence Badger
Brewster's Millions (1906)	Winchell Smith; Byron Ongley	Brewster's Millions (1935)	Thornton Freeland
Brewster's Millions (1906)	Winchell Smith; Byron Ongley	Brewster's Millions (1945)	Allan Dwan
Brewster's Millions (1906)	Winchell Smith; Byron Ongley	Three on a Spree (1961)	Sidney J. Furie
The Bride from Trieste	Ferenc Molnár	The Bride Wore Red (1937)	Dorothy Arzner
The Bride's Play	Brian Oswald Donn-Byrne	The Bride's Play (1922)	George Terwilliger
The Bridge (1909)	Rupert Hughes	The Bigger Man (1915)	John W. Noble
Brief Moment (1931)	S. N. Behrman	Brief Moment (1933)	David Burton
The Brig (1963	Kenneth H. Brown	The Brig (1964)	Jonas Mekas
Brighton Beach Memoirs (1982)	Neil Simon	Brighton Beach Memoirs (1986)	Gene Saks
The Brighton Twins (1908)	Tristan Bernard	The Brighton Twins (1936)	Claude Heymann
Brilliant Lies (1993)	David Williamson	Brilliant Lies (1996)	Richard Franklin
Broadway (1926)	George Abbott; Philip Dunning	Broadway (1929)	Paul Fejos
Broadway (1926)	George Abbott; Philip Dunning	Broadway (1942)	William A. Seiter
Broadway Bound (1986)	Neil Simon	Broadway Bound (1992)	Paul Bogart
Broadway Jones (1912)	George M. Cohan	Broadway Jones (1917)	Joseph Kaufman
Broadway Zauber	Ladislaus Bus-Fekete	Pepe (1960)	George Sidney
The Broken Circle Breakdown Featuring the Cover-Ups of Alabama (2009)	Johan Heldenbergh; Mieke Dobbels	The Broken Circle Breakdown (2012)	Felix van Groeningen
Broken Dishes (1929)	Martin Flavin	Too Young to Marry (1931)	Mervyn LeRoy
The Broken Jug (1808)	Heinrich von Kleist	The Broken Jug (1937)	Gustav Ucicky
The Broken Jug (1808)	Heinrich von Kleist	Jungfer, Sie gefällt mir (1969)	Günter Reisch
The Broken Melody (1893)	Herbert Keith; James Leader	The Broken Melody (1929)	Fred Paul
The Broken Wing (1920)	Paul Dickey; Charles W. Goddard	The Broken Wing (1923)	Tom Forman
The Broken Wing (1920)	Paul Dickey; Charles W. Goddard	The Broken Wing (1932)	Lloyd Corrigan
A Bronx Tale (1988)	Chazz Palminteri	A Bronx Tale (1993)	Robert De Niro
Brother Alfred (1913)	P. G. Wodehouse; Herbert Westbrook	Brother Alfred (1932)	Henry Edwards
A Brother's Kiss (1988)	Seth Zvi Rosenfeld	A Brother's Kiss (1997)	Seth Zvi Rosenfeld
Brothers	Edwin J. Burke	Woman Trap (1929)	William A. Wellman
Brott och brott	August Strindberg	Intoxication (1919)	Ernst Lubitsch
Brott och brott	August Strindberg	Sin (1928)	Gustaf Molander
Brown of Harvard (1906)	Rida Johnson Young	Brown of Harvard (1911)	Colin Campbell
Brown of Harvard (1906)	Rida Johnson Young	Brown of Harvard (1918)	Harry Beaumont
Brown of Harvard (1906)	Rida Johnson Young	Brown of Harvard (1926)	Jack Conway
Brown Sugar (1921)	Lady Arthur Lever	Brown Sugar (1922)	Fred Paul
Brown Sugar (1921)	Lady Arthur Lever	Brown Sugar (1931)	Leslie S. Hiscott
The Browning Version (1948)	Terence Rattigan	The Browning Version (1951)	Anthony Asquith
The Browning Version (1948)	Terence Rattigan	The Browning Version (1955)	
The Browning Version (1948)	Terence Rattigan	The Browning Version (1985)	Michael A. Simpson
The Browning Version (1948)	Terence Rattigan	The Browning Version (1994)	Mike Figgis
Brumby Innes (1927)	Katharine Susannah Prichard	Brumby Innes (1973)	John Smythe
Bug (1996)	Tracy Letts	Bug (2006)	William Friedkin
The Bull Boys	R.F. Delderfield	Carry On Sergeant (1958)	Gerald Thomas
Bulldog Drummond	H. C. McNeile; Gerald du Maurier	Bulldog Drummond (1922)	Oscar Apfel
Bulldog Drummond	H. C. McNeile; Gerald du Maurier	Bulldog Drummond (1929)	F. Richard Jones
A Bunch of Violets (1894)	Sydney Grundy	A Bunch of Violets (1916)	Frank Wilson
Burlesque (1927)	Arthur Hopkins; George Manker Watters	The Dance of Life (1929)	John Cromwell; A. Edward Sutherland
Burlesque (1927)	Arthur Hopkins; George Manker Watters	Swing High, Swing Low (1937)	Mitchell Leisen
Burlesque (1927)	Arthur Hopkins; George Manker Watters	When My Baby Smiles at Me (1948)	Walter Lang
Burning Blue (1995)	D. M. W. Greer	Burning Blue (2013)	D. M. W. Greer
The Burning Bush	Heinz Herald; Geza Herczeg	The Vicious Circle (1948)	W. Lee Wilder
Bus Stop (1955) and People in the Wind	William Inge	Bus Stop (1956)	Joshua Logan
The Bush King (1893)	W. J. Lincoln; Alfred Dampier	Captain Midnight, the Bush King (1911)	Alfred Rolfe
But Not Goodbye (1944)	George Seaton	The Cockeyed Miracle (1946)	S. Sylvan Simon
Butley	Simon Gray	Butley (1974)	Harold Pinter
The Butter and Egg Man (1925)	George S. Kaufman	The Butter and Egg Man (1928)	Richard Wallace
The Butter and Egg Man (1925)	George S. Kaufman	The Tenderfoot (1932)	Ray Enright
The Butter and Egg Man (1925)	George S. Kaufman	Hello, Sweetheart (1935)	Monty Banks
The Butter and Egg Man (1925)	George S. Kaufman	Dance Charlie Dance (1937)	Frank McDonald
The Butter and Egg Man (1925)	George S. Kaufman	An Angel from Texas (1940)	Ray Enright
The Butter and Egg Man (1925)	George S. Kaufman	Three Sailors and a Girl (1953)	Roy Del Ruth
Butterflies Are Free (1969)	Leonard Gershe	Butterflies Are Free (1972)	Milton Katselas
Byron (1908)	Alicia Ramsey	A Prince of Lovers (1922)	Charles Calvert

=== C ===
Play	Playwright	Film	Film director
Cabin B-13 (1948)	John Dickson Carr	Dangerous Crossing (1953)	Joseph M. Newman
Cabin in the Sky (1940)	Lynn Root; Vernon Duke; John Latouche	Cabin in the Sky (1943)	Vincente Minnelli
Cactus Flower (1965)	Abe Burrows	Cactus Flower (1969)	Gene Saks
Caesar and Cleopatra (1901)	George Bernard Shaw	Caesar and Cleopatra (1945)	Gabriel Pascal
Caesar's Wife (1919)	W. Somerset Maugham	Infatuation (1925)	Irving Cummings
Caesar's Wife (1919)	W. Somerset Maugham	Another Dawn (1937)	William Dieterle
Caín Adolescente	Román Chalbaud	Adolescence of Cain (1959)	Román Chalbaud
A Caixa (1980)	Hélder Prista Monteiro	A Caixa (1994)	Manoel de Oliveira
The Calendar (1929)	Edgar Wallace	The Calendar (1931)	T. Hayes Hunter
The Calendar (1929)	Edgar Wallace	The Calendar (1948)	Arthur Crabtree
California Suite (1976)	Neil Simon	California Suite (1978)	Herbert Moss
Call It a Day (1935)	Dodie Smith	Call It a Day (1937)	Archie Mayo
Call Me Madam (1950)	Howard Lindsay; Russel Crouse; Irving Berlin	Call Me Madam (1953)	Walter Lang
The Call of the North (1908)	George Broadhurst	The Call of the North (1914)	Oscar Apfel; Cecil B. DeMille
The Call of the North (1908)	George Broadhurst	The Call of the North (1921)	Joseph Henabery
Called Back (1884)	Hugh Conway; J. Comyns Carr	Called Back (1911)	W. J. Lincoln
Cameo Kirby (1908)	Booth Tarkington; Harry Leon Wilson	Cameo Kirby (1914)	Oscar Apfel
Cameo Kirby (1908)	Booth Tarkington; Harry Leon Wilson	Cameo Kirby (1923)	John Ford
Cameo Kirby (1908)	Booth Tarkington; Harry Leon Wilson	Cameo Kirby (1930)	Irving Cummings
Canaries Sometimes Sing (1929)	Frederick Lonsdale	Canaries Sometimes Sing (1930)	Tom Walls
Canción de cuna (1911)	Gregorio Martínez Sierra	Cradle Song (1933)	Mitchell Leisen
Canción de cuna (1911)	Gregorio Martínez Sierra	Canción de cuna (1941)	Gregorio Martínez Sierra
Canción de cuna (1911)	Gregorio Martínez Sierra	Cradle Song (1953)	Fernando de Fuentes
Canción de cuna (1911)	Gregorio Martínez Sierra	Cradle Song (1960)	George Schaefer
Canción de cuna (1911)	Gregorio Martínez Sierra	Cradle Song (1994)	José Luis Garci
Caprice (1884)	Howard P. Taylor	Caprice (1913)	J. Searle Dawley
Captain Alvarez	Paul Gilmore	Captain Alvarez (1914)	Rollin S. Sturgeon
Captain Applejack (1921, also known as Ambrose Applejohn's Adventure)	Walter Hackett	Strangers of the Night (1923)	Fred Niblo
Captain Applejack (1921, also known as Ambrose Applejohn's Adventure)	Walter Hackett	Captain Applejack (1931)	Hobart Henley
Captain Kidd Junior (1916)	Rida Johnson Young	Captain Kidd, Jr. (1919)	William Desmond Taylor
The Captain of Köpenick (1931)	Carl Zuckmayer	The Captain from Köpenick (1931)	Richard Oswald
The Captain of Köpenick (1931)	Carl Zuckmayer	The Captain from Köpenick (1945)	Richard Oswald
The Captain of Köpenick (1931)	Carl Zuckmayer	The Captain from Köpenick (1956)	Helmut Käutner
The Captain of Köpenick (1931)	Carl Zuckmayer	Der Hauptmann von Köpenick (1997)	Frank Beyer
The Captain of Köpenick (1931)	Carl Zuckmayer	The Captain of Nakara (2012)	Bob Nyanja
Captive (1990)	Paul Weitz	Sex and the Other Man (1995)	Karl Slovin
The Captive	Cecil B. DeMille; Jeanie MacPherson	The Captive (1915)	Cecil B. DeMille
Career (1956)	James Lee	Career (1959)	Joseph Anthony
The Caretaker (1960)	Harold Pinter	The Caretaker (1963)	Clive Donner
The Case of Becky (1912)	Edward J. Locke; David Belasco	The Case of Becky (1915)	Frank Reicher
The Case of Becky (1912)	Edward J. Locke; David Belasco	The Case of Becky (1921)	Chester M. Franklin
The Case of the Frightened Lady (1931)	Edgar Wallace	The Case of the Frightened Lady (1940)	George King
The Case of the Frightened Lady (1931)	Edgar Wallace	The Frightened Lady (1932)	T. Hayes Hunter
The Case of Lady Camber (1915)	Horace Annesley Vachell	The Case of Lady Camber (1920)	Walter West
The Case of Lady Camber (1915)	Horace Annesley Vachell	Lord Camber's Ladies (1932)	Benn Levy
The Case of Lady Camber (1915)	Horace Annesley Vachell	The Story of Shirley Yorke (1948)	Maclean Rogers
The Cat and the Canary (1922)	John Willard	The Cat and the Canary (1927)	Paul Leni
The Cat and the Canary (1922)	John Willard	The Cat Creeps (1930)	Rupert Julian
The Cat and the Canary (1922)	John Willard	The Cat and the Canary (1939)	Elliott Nugent
The Cat and the Canary (1922)	John Willard	The Cat and the Canary (1961)	Jan Molander
The Cat and the Canary (1922)	John Willard	The Cat and the Canary (1978)	Radley Metzger
Cat on a Hot Tin Roof (1955)	Tennessee Williams	Cat on a Hot Tin Roof (1958)	Richard Brooks
Cat on a Hot Tin Roof (1955)	Tennessee Williams	Cat on a Hot Tin Roof (1984, TV)	Jack Hofsiss
The Catered Affair (1955)	Paddy Chayefsky	The Catered Affair (1956)	Richard Brooks
Cats (1981)	Andrew Lloyd Webber	Cats (1998)	David Mallet
Cats (1981)	Andrew Lloyd Webber	Cats (2019)	Tom Hooper
Cavalcade (1931)	Noël Coward	Cavalcade (1933)	Frank Lloyd
The Cave Girl (1920)	Guy Bolton; George Middleton	The Cave Girl (1921)	Joseph Franz
The Caveman (1911)	Gelett Burgess	The Caveman (1915)	Theodore Marston
The Chalk Garden (1955)	Enid Bagnold	The Chalk Garden (1964)	Ronald Neame
Chalked Out (1937)	Lewis E. Lawes	You Can't Get Away with Murder (1939)	Lewis Seiler
The Champion (1921)	Thomas Louden; A. E. Thomas	The World's Champion (1922)	Phil Rosen
Chance the Idol (1902)	Henry Arthur Jones	Chance the Idol (1927)	Graham Cutts
The Changeling (1622)	Thomas Middleton; William Rowley	The Changeling (1998)	Marcus Thompson
The Changeling (1622)	Thomas Middleton; William Rowley	Compulsion (2009)	Sarah Harding
Chapter Two (1977)	Neil Simon	Chapter Two (1979)	Robert Moore
Charley's Aunt	Brandon Thomas	Charley's Aunt (1925)	Scott Sidney
Charley's Aunt	Brandon Thomas	Charley's Aunt (1926)	Elis Ellis
Charley's Aunt	Brandon Thomas	Charley's Aunt (1930)	Al Christie
Charley's Aunt	Brandon Thomas	Charley's (Big-Hearted) Aunt (1940)	Walter Forde
Charley's Aunt	Brandon Thomas	Charley's Aunt (1941)	Archie Mayo
Charley's Aunt	Brandon Thomas	Where's Charley? (1952)	David Butler
Charley's Aunt	Brandon Thomas	Charley's Aunt (1963)	Géza von Cziffra
Charley's Aunt	Brandon Thomas	Hello, I'm Your Aunt! (1975)	Viktor Titov
The Chase (1952)	Horton Foote	The Chase (1966)	Arthur Penn
Chase Me, Comrade	Ray Cooney	Not Now, Comrade (1976)	Ray Cooney; Harold Snoad
Chatroom (2005)	Enda Walsh	Chatroom (2010)	Hideo Nakata
The Chatterbox	Bayard Veiller	Smooth as Satin (1925)	Ralph Ince
The Chatterbox	Bayard Veiller	Alias French Gertie (1930)	George Archainbaud
Chauffeur Antoinette (1932)	Jean de Létraz; Suzanne Desty; Roger Blum	Chauffeur Antoinette	Herbert Selpin
Chauffeur Antoinette (1932)	Jean de Létraz; Suzanne Desty; Roger Blum	The Love Contract (1932)	Herbert Selpin
Chauffeur Antoinette (1932)	Jean de Létraz; Suzanne Desty; Roger Blum	Antoinette (1932)	Herbert Selpin
Cheating Cheaters (1916)	Max Marcin	Cheating Cheaters (1919)	Allan Dwan
Cheating Cheaters (1916)	Max Marcin	Cheating Cheaters (1927)	Edward Laemmle
Cheating Cheaters (1916)	Max Marcin	Cheating Cheaters (1934)	Richard Thorpe
Cheech, ou Les hommes de Chrysler sont en ville (2002)	François Létourneau	Cheech (2006)	Patrice Sauvé
Chelsea Walls (1990)	Nicole Burdette	Chelsea Walls (2001)	Ethan Hawke
Cher Antoine ou l'Amour raté (1969)	Jean Anouilh	You Ain't Seen Nothin' Yet (2012)	Alain Resnais
Chérie noire	Francois Campaux	Tesoro mio (1979)	Giulio Paradisi
The Cherry Orchard	Anton Chekhov	The Cherry Orchard (1973)	David Zweck
The Cherry Orchard	Anton Chekhov	The Cherry Orchard (1981, TV)	Richard Eyre
The Cherry Orchard	Anton Chekhov	The Cherry Orchard (1999)	Michael Cacoyannis
Chi House	Mary Coyle Chase	Sorority House (1939)	John Farrow
Chicago (1926)	Maurine Dallas Watkins	Chicago (1927)	Cecil B. DeMille
Chicago (1926)	Maurine Dallas Watkins	Roxie Hart (1942)	William A. Wellman
Chicago (1926)	Maurine Dallas Watkins	Chicago (2002)	Rob Marshall
Chicken Every Sunday (1944)	Julius J. Epstein; Philip G. Epstein	Chicken Every Sunday (1949)	George Seaton
Child of Manhattan (1932)	Preston Sturges	Child of Manhattan (1933)	Edward Buzzell
Child's Play (1970)	Robert Marasco	Child's Play (1972)	Sidney Lumet
Children in Uniform (1930)	Christa Winsloe	Mädchen in Uniform (1931)	Leontine Sagan
Children in Uniform (1930)	Christa Winsloe	Mädchen in Uniform (1958)	Géza von Radványi
Children of a Lesser God (1979)	Mark Medoff	Children of a Lesser God (1986)	Randa Haines
The Children's Hour (1934)	Lillian Hellman	These Three (1936)	William Wyler
The Children's Hour (1934)	Lillian Hellman	The Children's Hour (1961)	William Wyler
Chimmie Fadden (1896)	Edward W. Townsend	Chimmie Fadden (1915)	Cecil B. DeMille
Chinese Coffee (1992)	Ira Lewis	Chinese Coffee (2000)	Al Pacino
The Chinese Puzzle	Leon M. Lion; Marion Bower	The Chinese Puzzle (1919)	Fred Goodwins
The Chinese Puzzle	Leon M. Lion; Marion Bower	The Chinese Puzzle (1932)	Guy Newall
The Chink in the Armour	Horace Annesley Vachell	The House of Peril (1922)	Kenelm Foss
Chip, Chip, Chip	Alec Coppel	The Statue (1971)	Rod Amateau
The Chocolate Soldier (1908)	Rudolf Bernauer; Oscar Straus	The Chocolate Soldier (1941)	Roy Del Ruth
The Chorus Lady (1906)	James Forbes	The Chorus Lady (1915)	Frank Reicher
The Chorus Lady (1906)	James Forbes	The Chorus Lady (1924)	Ralph Ince
A Chorus of Disapproval (1984)	Alan Ayckbourn	A Chorus of Disapproval (1989)	Michael Winner
Chotard et Cie	Roger Ferdinand	Chotard et Cie (1933)	Jean Renoir
Chouchou poids plume (1925)	Jacques Bousquet	Gentleman of the Ring (1926)	Gaston Ravel
Chouchou poids plume (1925)	Jacques Bousquet	Gentleman of the Ring (1932)	Robert Bibal
The Christian (1898; revised 1907)	Hall Caine	The Christian (1911)	Franklyn Barrett
The Christian (1898; revised 1907)	Hall Caine	The Christian (1914)	Frederick A. Thomson
The Christian (1898; revised 1907)	Hall Caine	The Christian (1915)	George Loane Tucker
The Christian (1898; revised 1907)	Hall Caine	The Christian (1923)	Maurice Tourneur
Christopher Blake (1946)	Moss Hart	The Decision of Christopher Blake (1948)	Peter Godfrey
Chrysalis (1932)	Rose Porter	All of Me (1934)	James Flood
The Church Mouse (1928)	Ladislas Fodor	Poor as a Church Mouse (1931)	Richard Oswald
The Church Mouse (1928)	Ladislas Fodor	The Church Mouse (1934)	Monty Banks
The Church Mouse (1928)	Ladislas Fodor	Frøken Kirkemus (1941)	Lau Lauritzen Jr.
Ciboulette (1923)	Robert de Flers; Francis de Croisset	Ciboulette (1933)	Claude Autant-Lara
Cinco i Marinko (1992)	Mate Matišić	When the Dead Start Singing (1998)	Krsto Papić
The Circle (1921)	W. Somerset Maugham	The Circle (1925)	Frank Borzage
The Circle (1921)	W. Somerset Maugham	Strictly Unconventional (1930)	David Burton
The City (1909)	Clyde Fitch	The City (1916)	Thurlow Bergen
The City (1909)	Clyde Fitch	The City (1926)	Roy William Neill
Civilian Clothes (1919)	Thompson Buchanan	Civilian Clothes (1920)	Hugh Ford
The Clansman (1905)	Thomas Dixon Jr.	The Birth of a Nation (1915)	D. W. Griffith
Clara Gibbings (1928)	Aimée Stuart; Philip Stuart	Clara Gibbings (1934)	F. W. Thring
Clarence (1919)	Booth Tarkington	Clarence (1922)	William C. deMille
Clarence (1919)	Booth Tarkington	Clarence (1937)	George Archainbaud
Clash by Night (1941)	Clifford Odets	Clash by Night (1952)	Fritz Lang
Classmates (1907)	William C. deMille; Margaret Turnbull	Classmates (1914)	James Kirkwood Sr.
Claudia (1941)	Rose Franken	Claudia (1943)	Edmund Goulding
Cléopâtre (1890)	Victorien Sardou	Cleopatra (1912)	Charles L. Gaskill
Cléopâtre (1890)	Victorien Sardou	Cleopatra (1917)	J. Gordon Edwards
Clérambard (1950)	Marcel Aymé	Clérambard (1969)	Yves Robert
The Climax (1909)	Edward Locke	The Climax (1930)	Renaud Hoffman
The Climax (1909)	Edward Locke	The Climax (1944)	George Waggner
The Climbers (1901)	Clyde Fitch	The Climbers (1915)	Barry O'Neil
The Climbers (1901)	Clyde Fitch	The Climbers (1919)	Tom Terriss
The Climbers (1901)	Clyde Fitch	The Climbers (1927)	Paul L. Stein
The Clinging Vine (1923)	Zelda Sears	The Clinging Vine (1926)	Paul Sloane
Closer (1997)	Patrick Marber	Closer (2004)	Mike Nichols
Clothes (1906)	Avery Hopwood; Channing Pollock	Clothes (1914)	Francis Powers
Clothes (1906)	Avery Hopwood; Channing Pollock	Clothes (1920)	Fred Sittenham
The Club (1977)	David Williamson	The Club (1980)	Bruce Beresford
The Cobweb	Naunton Davies; Leon M. Lion	The Cobweb (1917)	Cecil Hepworth
Cockroach Trilogy (1981): The Cockroach That Ate Cincinnati; The Return of the Cockroach; The Cockroach Has Landed	Alan Williams	The Cockroach that Ate Cincinnati (1996)	Michael McNamara
Cold Comfort (1982)	Jim Garrard	Cold Comfort (1989)	Vic Sarin
The College Widow (1904)	George Ade	The College Widow (1915)	Barry O'Neil
The College Widow (1904)	George Ade	The College Widow (1927)	Archie Mayo
The College Widow (1904)	George Ade	Maybe It's Love (1930)	William A. Wellman
The College Widow (1904)	George Ade	Freshman Love (1936)	William C. McGann
The Colleen Bawn (1860)	Dion Boucicault	The Colleen Bawn (1911, American)	Sidney Olcott
The Colleen Bawn (1860)	Dion Boucicault	The Colleen Bawn (1911, Australian)	Gaston Mervale
The Colleen Bawn (1860)	Dion Boucicault	The Colleen Bawn (1924)	W. P. Kellino
The Colleen Bawn (1860)	Dion Boucicault	Lily of Killarney (1929)	George Ridgwell
The Colleen Bawn (1860)	Dion Boucicault	Lily of Killarney (1934)	Dion Boucicault
Come Again Smith	John H. Blackwood	Come Again Smith (1919)	E. Mason Hopper
Come Back, Little Sheba (1950)	William Inge	Come Back, Little Sheba (1952)	Daniel Mann
Come Back, Little Sheba (1950)	William Inge	Come Back, Little Sheba (1978, TV)	Silvio Narizzano
Come Back to the 5 & Dime, Jimmy Dean, Jimmy Dean (1976)	Ed Graczyk	Come Back to the Five and Dime, Jimmy Dean, Jimmy Dean (1982)	Robert Altman
Come Blow Your Horn (1961)	Neil Simon	Come Blow Your Horn (1963)	Bud Yorkin
Come Out of the Kitchen (1916)	A. E. Thomas	Come Out of the Kitchen (1919)	John S. Robertson
Come prima, meglio di prima (1923)	Luigi Pirandello	This Love of Ours (1945)	William Dieterle
Come prima, meglio di prima (1923)	Luigi Pirandello	Never Say Goodbye (1956)	Jerry Hopper
Come to See Me (1996)	Kim Kwang-lim	Memories of Murder (2003)	Bong Joon-ho
Come tu mi vuoi (1930)	Luigi Pirandello	As You Desire Me (1932)	George Fitzmaurice
Come tu mi vuoi (1930)	Luigi Pirandello	Va savoir (2001)	Jacques Rivette
The Comedy of Errors (1592)	William Shakespeare	Angoor (1982)	Gulzar
The Comedy of Errors (1592)	William Shakespeare	Ulta Palta (1997)	N. S. Shankar
The Comedy of Errors (1592)	William Shakespeare	Big Business (1988)	Jim Abrahams
The Comedy of Errors (1592)	William Shakespeare	Bade Miyan Chote Miyan (1998)	David Dhawan
The Comedy of Errors (1592)	William Shakespeare	Ambuttu Imbuttu Embuttu (2005)	Ashok Kashyap
The Coming of Stork (1970)	David Williamson	Stork (1971)	Tim Burstall
Command Decision (1947)	William Wister Haines	Command Decision (1948)	Sam Wood
The Command to Love (1927)	Rudolph Lothar; Fritz Gottwald	Die große Liebe (1931)	Otto Preminger
Common Clay (1914)	Cleves Kinkead	Common Clay (1919)	George Fitzmaurice
Common Clay (1914)	Cleves Kinkead	Common Clay (1930)	Victor Fleming
Common Clay (1914)	Cleves Kinkead	Private Number (1936)	Roy Del Ruth
The Commuters (1910)	James Forbes	The Commuters (1915)	George Fitzmaurice
Compleat Female Stage Beauty (1999)	Jeffrey Hatcher	Stage Beauty (2004)	Richard Eyre
Concealment	Leonard Ide	The Secret Bride (1934)	William Dieterle
The Concert (1909)	Hermann Bahr	The Concert (1921)	Victor Schertzinger
The Concert (1909)	Hermann Bahr	Fashions in Love (1929)	Victor Schertzinger
The Concert (1909)	Hermann Bahr	The Concert (1931)	Leo Mittler
Conchita	Edward Knoblock	Love Comes Along (1930)	Rupert Julian
The Condemned of Altona (1959)	Jean-Paul Sartre	The Condemned of Altona (1962)	Vittorio De Sica
Confession	Ernest Vajda	The Woman on Trial (1927)	Mauritz Stiller
Conflict (1925)	Miles Malleson	The Woman Between (1931)	Miles Malleson
The Connection (1959)	Jack Gelber	The Connection (1961)	Shirley Clarke
Connie Goes Home (1923)	Edward Childs Carpenter	The Major and the Minor (1942)	Billy Wilder
Connie Goes Home (1923)	Edward Childs Carpenter	You're Never Too Young (1955)	Norman Taurog
The Conspiracy (1912)	John Emerson; Robert B. Baker	The Conspiracy (1914)	Allan Dwan
The Conspiracy (1912)	John Emerson; Robert B. Baker	Conspiracy (1930)	Christy Cabanne
The Constant Nymph (1926)	Margaret Kennedy; Basil Dean	The Constant Nymph (1928)	Adrian Brunel
The Constant Nymph (1926)	Margaret Kennedy; Basil Dean	The Constant Nymph (1933)	Basil Dean
The Constant Nymph (1926)	Margaret Kennedy; Basil Dean	The Constant Nymph (1943)	Edmund Goulding
The Constant Wife (1926)	W. Somerset Maugham	Charming Sinners (1929)	Robert Milton
Convicts (1977)	Horton Foote	Convicts (1991)	Peter Masterson
Copenhagen (1998)	Michael Frayn	Copenhagen (2002, TV)	Howard Davies
The Copperhead (1918)	Augustus Thomas	The Copperhead (1920)	Charles Maigne
Coquette (1927)	George Abbott; Ann Preston Bridgers	Coquette (1929)	Sam Taylor
Coriolanus (1608)	William Shakespeare	Coriolanus (2011)	Ralph Fiennes
The Corn Is Green (1938)	Emlyn Williams	The Corn Is Green (1945)	Irving Rapper
The Corn Is Green (1938)	Emlyn Williams	The Corn Is Green (1979, TV)	George Cukor
Cornered (1920)	Dodson Mitchell; Zelda Sears	Road to Paradise (1930)	William Beaudine
Corruzione al palazzo di giustizia (1944)	Ugo Betti	Smiling Maniacs (1975)	Marcello Aliprandi
Così (1992)	Louis Nowra	Cosi (1996)	Mark Joffe
Cottage to Let (1940)	Geoffrey Kerr	Cottage to Let (1941)	Anthony Asquith
Counsel's Opinion (1931)	Gilbert Wakefield	Counsel's Opinion (1933)	Allan Dwan
Counsel's Opinion (1931)	Gilbert Wakefield	The Divorce of Lady X (1938)	Tim Whelan
Counsellor-at-Law (1931)	Elmer Rice	Counsellor at Law (1933)	William Wyler
The Count of Monte Cristo (1868)	Charles Fechter	Monte Cristo (1922)	Emmett J. Flynn
Counterattack (1943)	Janet Stevenson; Philip Stevenson	Counter-Attack (1945)	Zoltan Korda
The Country Girl (1950)	Clifford Odets	The Country Girl (1954)	George Seaton
The County Chairman (1903)	George Ade	The County Chairman (1914)	Allan Dwan
The County Chairman (1903)	George Ade	The County Chairman (1935)	John G. Blystone
The County Fair (1888)	Charles Barnard	The County Fair (1920)	Edmund Mortimer; Maurice Tourneur
Courage (1928)	Tom Barry	Courage (1930)	Archie Mayo
Courage (1928)	Tom Barry	My Bill (1938)	John Farrow
Cousin Kate (1903)	Hubert Henry Davies	Cousin Kate (1921)	Lucille McVey
Cousin Kate (1903)	Hubert Henry Davies	Strictly Modern (1930)	William A. Seiter
The Cowboy and the Lady (1899)	Clyde Fitch	The Cowboy and the Lady (1915)	Edwin Carewe
The Cowboy and the Lady (1899)	Clyde Fitch	The Cowboy and the Lady (1922)	Charles Maigne
Co-workers	Eldar Ryazanov; Emil Braginsky	Office Romance (1977)	Eldar Ryazanov
Cradle Snatchers (1925)	Norma Mitchell	Cradle Snatchers (1927)	Howard Hawks
Craig's Wife (1925)	George Kelly	Craig's Wife (1928)	William C. deMille
Craig's Wife (1925)	George Kelly	Craig's Wife (1936)	Dorothy Arzner
Craig's Wife (1925)	George Kelly	Harriet Craig (1950)	Vincent Sherman
Creditors (1889)	August Strindberg	Creditors (1988)	Keve Hjelm
Creditors (1889)	August Strindberg	Creditors (2015)	Ben Cura
Crime (1927)	Samuel Shipman; John B. Hymer	The Pay-Off (1930)	Lowell Sherman
Crime (1927)	Samuel Shipman; John B. Hymer	Law of the Underworld (1938)	Lew Landers
Crimes of the Heart (1978)	Beth Henley	Crimes of the Heart (1986)	Bruce Beresford
The Criminal Code (1929)	Martin Flavin	The Criminal Code (1931)	Howard Hawks
Critic's Choice (1960)	Ira Levin	Critic's Choice (1963)	Don Weis
The Critical Year	Rudolph Lothar; Hans Backwitz	For Wives Only (1926)	Victor Heerman
Crossing Delancey (1985)	Susan Sandler	Crossing Delancey (1988)	Joan Micklin Silver
The Crowded Hour (1918)	Edgar Selwyn; Channing Pollock	The Crowded Hour (1925)	E. Mason Hopper
The Crucible (1953)	Arthur Miller	The Crucible (1957)	Raymond Rouleau
The Crucible (1953)	Arthur Miller	The Crucible (1996)	Nicholas Hytner
The Crusader	Wilson Collison	The Crusader (1932)	Frank R. Strayer
Cry Havoc (1942)	Allan R. Kenward	Cry 'Havoc' (1943)	Richard Thorpe
The Cub (1910)	Thompson Buchanan	The Cub (1915)	Maurice Tourneur
A Cuckoo in the Nest (1925)	Ben Travers	A Cuckoo in the Nest (1933)	Tom Walls
A Cuckoo in the Nest (1925)	Ben Travers	Fast and Loose (1954)	Gordon Parry
A Cup of Coffee (1931)	Preston Sturges	Christmas in July (1940)	Preston Sturges
The Curious Conduct of Judge Legarde (1912)	Victor Mapes	The Curious Conduct of Judge Legarde (1915)	Will S. Davis
Curse of the Starving Class (1977)	Sam Shepard	Curse of the Starving Class (1994)	J. Michael McClary
Cymbeline (1611)	William Shakespeare	Cymbeline (2014)	Michael Almereyda
Cyrano de Bergerac	Edmond Rostand	Cyrano de Bergerac (1925)	Augusto Genina
Cyrano de Bergerac	Edmond Rostand	Cyrano de Bergerac (1946)	Fernand Rivers
Cyrano de Bergerac	Edmond Rostand	Cyrano de Bergerac (1950)	Michael Gordon
Cyrano de Bergerac	Edmond Rostand	Life of an Expert Swordsman (1959)	Hiroshi Inagaki
Cyrano de Bergerac	Edmond Rostand	Cyrano and d'Artagnan (1964)	Abel Gance
Cyrano de Bergerac	Edmond Rostand	Cyrano de Bergerac (1974)	William Ball
Cyrano de Bergerac	Edmond Rostand	Roxanne (1987)	Fred Schepisi
Cyrano de Bergerac	Edmond Rostand	Cyrano de Bergerac (1990)	Jean-Paul Rappeneau
Cyrano de Bergerac	Edmond Rostand	Cyrano Fernández (2007)	Alberto Arvelo
Cyrano de Bergerac	Edmond Rostand	Cyrano de Bergerac (2008, TV)	David Leveaux
Cyrano de Bergerac	Edmond Rostand	Cyrano Agency (2010)	Kim Hyun-seok
Cyrano de Bergerac	Edmond Rostand	#Roxy (2018)	Michael Kennedy
The Czarina (1922)	Edward Sheldon	Forbidden Paradise (1924)	Ernst Lubitsch

=== D ===
Play	Playwright	Film	Film director
Da (1978)	Hugh Leonard	Da (1988)	Matt Clark
Daddy (2010)	Dan Via	Daddy (2015)	Gerald McCullouch
Daddy's Gone A-Hunting (1921)	Zoe Akins	Daddy's Gone A-Hunting (1925)	Frank Borzage
Dame Nature	André Birabeau	Too Young for Love (1953)	Lionello De Felice
A Damsel in Distress (1928)	P. G. Wodehouse; Ian Hay	A Damsel in Distress (1937)	George Stevens
The Dance of Death (1900)	August Strindberg	The Dance of Death (1948)	Erich von Stroheim
The Dance of Death (1900)	August Strindberg	The Dance of Death (1967)	Michael Verhoeven
The Dance of Death (1900)	August Strindberg	Dance of Death (1969)	David Giles
The Dancers (1923)	Gerald du Maurier; Viola Tree	The Dancers (1925)	Emmett J. Flynn
The Dancers (1923)	Gerald du Maurier; Viola Tree	The Dancers (1930)	Chandler Sprague
Dancing at Lughnasa (1990)	Brian Friel	Dancing at Lughnasa (1998)	Pat O'Connor
The Dancing Girl (1891)	Henry Arthur Jones	The Dancing Girl (1915)	Allan Dwan
Dancing Mothers (1924)	Edgar Selwyn; Edmund Goulding	Dancing Mothers (1926)	Herbert Brenon
The Danger Mark (1909)	Robert W. Chambers	The Danger Mark (1918)	Hugh Ford
Dangerous Afternoon (1951)	Gerald Anstruther	Dangerous Afternoon (1961)	Charles Saunders
Dangerous Corner (1932)	J. B. Priestley	Dangerous Corner (1934)	Phil Rosen
Dangerous Corner (1932)	J. B. Priestley	Dangerous Corner (1983, TV)	James Ormerod
Dangerous Obsession (1987)	N. J. Crisp	Darkness Falls (1999)	Gerry Lively
A Dangerous Set	Marion Dix; Jerry Horwin	Two Against the World (1932)	Archie Mayo
Dangerously Yours	Charles Beahan	Murder by the Clock (1931)	Edward Sloman
Daniel (1920)	Louis Verneuil	Who Is the Man? (1924)	Walter Summers
Daniel (1920)	Louis Verneuil	The Woman They Talk About (1931)	Victor Janson
Dans sa candeur naive (1926)	Jacques Deval	The Cardboard Lover (1928)	Robert Z. Leonard
Dans sa candeur naive (1926)	Jacques Deval	The Passionate Plumber (1932)	Edward Sedgwick
Dans sa candeur naive (1926)	Jacques Deval	Her Cardboard Lover (1942)	George Cukor
The Danton Case (1929)	Stanisława Przybyszewska	Danton (1983)	Andrzej Wajda
Danton's Death (1835)	Georg Büchner	Danton (1921)	Dimitri Buchowetzki
The Dark Angel (1925)	H. B. Trevelyan	The Dark Angel (1925)	George Fitzmaurice
The Dark Angel (1925)	H. B. Trevelyan	The Dark Angel (1935)	Sidney Franklin
The Dark at the Top of the Stairs (1957)	William Inge	The Dark at the Top of the Stairs (1960)	Delbert Mann
Dark Days and Light Nights	Jamal Ali	Black Joy (1977)	Anthony Simmons
The Dark Tower (1933)	George S. Kaufman; Alexander Woollcott	The Man with Two Faces (1934)	Archie Mayo
Dark Victory (1934)	George Brewer Jr. Bertram Bloch	Dark Victory (1939)	Edmund Goulding
A Darker Purpose (1991)	Wendy Riss Gatsiounis	The Winner	Alex Cox
Das Frauenopfer (1920)	Georg Kaiser	Women's Sacrifice (1922)	Karl Grune
Das Käthchen von Heilbronn (1810)	Heinrich von Kleist	Catherine de Heilbronn (1980)	Éric Rohmer
Das weite Land (1911)	Arthur Schnitzler	The Distant Land (1987)	Luc Bondy
Das Zweite Leben (1927)	Rudolf Bernauer; Rudolf Österreicher	Three Sinners (1928)	Rowland V. Lee
Das Zweite Leben (1927)	Rudolf Bernauer; Rudolf Österreicher	Once a Lady (1931)	Guthrie McClintic
David Garrick (1856)	T. W. Robertson	David Garrick (1916)	Frank Lloyd
David Harum (1900)	R. Hitchcock; M. W. Hitchcock	David Harum (1915)	Allan Dwan
The Dawn of a Tomorrow (1905)	Frances Hodgson Burnett	The Dawn of a Tomorrow (1915)	James Kirkwood Sr.
A Day in the Death of Joe Egg (1967)	Peter Nichols	A Day in the Death of Joe Egg (1968)	Peter Medak
A Day's Mischief	Lesley Storm	Personal Affair (1953)	Anthony Pelissier
Daybreak (1917)	Jane Cowl; Jane Murfin	Daybreak (1918)	Albert Capellani
Days of Wine and Roses (1958)	JP Miller	Days of Wine and Roses (1962)	Blake Edwards
The Dazzling Hour	Anna Bonacci	Wife for a Night (1952)	Mario Camerini
The Dazzling Hour	Anna Bonacci	Kiss Me, Stupid (1964)	Billy Wilder
De dans van de reiger (1962)	Hugo Claus	De Dans van de Reiger (1966)	Fons Rademakers
Dead End (1935)	Sidney Kingsley	Dead End (1937)	William Wyler
Dead Pigeon (1953)	Lenard Kantor	Tight Spot (1955)	Phil Karlson
Deadlock	Leslie Sands	Another Man's Poison (1951)	Irving Rapper
Dear Me (1921)	Hale Hamilton	The Purple Highway (1923)	Henry Kolker
Dear Octopus (1938)	Dodie Smith	Dear Octopus (1943)	Harold French
Dear Ruth (1944)	Norman Krasna	Dear Ruth (1947)	William D. Russell
Death and the Maiden (1990)	Ariel Dorfman	Death and the Maiden (1994)	Roman Polanski
Death of a Salesman (1949)	Arthur Miller	Death of a Salesman (1951)	László Benedek
Death of a Salesman (1949)	Arthur Miller	Death of a Salesman (1966, TV)	James B. Clark
Death of a Salesman (1949)	Arthur Miller	Death of a Salesman (1985, TV)	Volker Schlöndorff
Death of a Salesman (1949)	Arthur Miller	Death of a Salesman (2000, TV)	Kirk Browning
Death of Yazdgerd (1979)	Bahram Beyzai	Death of Yazdgerd (1982)	Bahram Beyzai
Death Takes a Holiday (1929)	Walter Ferris	Death Takes a Holiday (1934)	Mitchell Leisen
Death Takes a Holiday (1929)	Walter Ferris	Meet Joe Black (1998)	Martin Brest
Deathtrap (1978)	Ira Levin	Deathtrap (1982)	Sidney Lumet
Deathwatch (1949)	Jean Genet	Deathwatch (1965)	Vic Morrow
Deburau (1918)	Sacha Guitry	The Lover of Camille (1924)	Harry Beaumont
Decadence (1981)	Steven Berkoff	Decadence (1994)	Steven Berkoff
Déclassée (1919)	Zoe Akins	Déclassée (1925)	Robert G. Vignola
Déclassée (1919)	Zoe Akins	Her Private Life (1929)	Alexander Korda
The Deep Blue Sea (1952)	Terence Rattigan	The Deep Blue Sea (1955)	Anatole Litvak
The Deep Blue Sea (1952)	Terence Rattigan	The Deep Blue Sea (2011)	Terence Davies
The Deep Purple (1910)	Paul Armstrong	The Deep Purple (1915)	James Young
The Deep Purple (1910)	Paul Armstrong	The Deep Purple (1920)	Raoul Walsh
A Delicate Balance (1966)	Edward Albee	A Delicate Balance (1973)	Tony Richardson
Delila	Ferenc Molnár	Blonde Fever (1944)	Richard Whorf
The Deputy	Rolf Hochhuth	Amen. (2002)	Costa-Gavras
Der Andere (1893)	Paul Lindau	The Prosecutor Hallers (1930)	Robert Wiene
Der Andere (1893)	Paul Lindau	The Other (1930)	Robert Wiene
Der Andere (1893)	Paul Lindau	The Haller Case (1933)	Alessandro Blasetti
Der Blaufuchs	Ferenc Herczeg	The Blue Fox (1938)	Viktor Tourjansky
Der böse Geist Lumpacivagabundus (1833)	Johann Nestroy	Lumpaci the Vagabond (1922)	Carl Wilhelm
Der böse Geist Lumpacivagabundus (1833)	Johann Nestroy	Lumpaci the Vagabond (1936)	Géza von Bolváry
Der Feldherrnhügel (1910)	Alexander Roda Roda; Carl Rößler	Grandstand for General Staff (1926)	Hans Otto Löwenstein; Erich Schönfelder
Der Feldherrnhügel (1910)	Alexander Roda Roda; Carl Rößler	Grandstand for General Staff (1932)	Eugen Thiele
Der Feldherrnhügel (1910)	Alexander Roda Roda; Carl Rößler	Grandstand for General Staff (1953)	Ernst Marischka
Der Frauenarzt (1928)	Hans Rehfisch	Doctor Bertram (1957)	Werner Klingler
Der fröhliche Weinberg (1925)	Carl Zuckmayer	The Merry Vineyard (1927)	Jacob Fleck; Luise Fleck
Der fröhliche Weinberg (1925)	Carl Zuckmayer	The Merry Vineyard (1952)	Erich Engel
Der Fürst von Pappenheim (operetta)	Franz Arnold; Ernst Bach	The Prince of Pappenheim (1927)	Richard Eichberg
Der Fürst von Pappenheim (operetta)	Franz Arnold; Ernst Bach	The Prince of Pappenheim (1952)	Hans Deppe
Der Geigenmacher von Mittenwald	Ludwig Ganghofer	The Violin Maker of Mittenwald (1950)	Rudolf Schündler
Der Graf von Charolais (1906)	Richard Beer-Hofmann	The Count of Charolais (1922)	Karl Grune
Der Herr ohne Wohnung (1913)	Bela Jenbach; Rudolf Österreicher	The Gentleman Without a Residence (1915)	Fritz Freund
Der Herr ohne Wohnung (1913)	Bela Jenbach; Rudolf Österreicher	The Gentleman Without a Residence (1934)	E. W. Emo
Der Herr ohne Wohnung (1913)	Bela Jenbach; Rudolf Österreicher	Who's Your Lady Friend? (1937)	Carol Reed
Der Judas von Tirol (1897)	Karl Schönherr	The Judas of Tyrol (1933)	Franz Osten
Der keusche Lebemann (1921)	Franz Arnold; Ernst Bach	The Night Without Pause (1931)	Andrew Marton
Der keusche Lebemann (1921)	Franz Arnold; Ernst Bach	The Chaste Libertine (1952)	Carl Boese
Der Müll, die Stadt und der Tod	Rainer Werner Fassbinder	Shadow of Angels (1976)	Daniel Schmid
Der mutige Seefahrer	Georg Kaiser	Hurrah! I Live! (1928)	Wilhelm Thiele
Der mutige Seefahrer	Georg Kaiser	The Valiant Navigator (1935)	Hans Deppe
Der mutige Seefahrer	Georg Kaiser	The Ghost Comes Home (1940)	Wilhelm Thiele
Der Raub der Sabinerinnen (1884)	Franz von Schönthan; Paul von Schönthan	Romulus and the Sabines (1945)	Mario Bonnard
Der Sprung in die Ehe	Max Reimann Otto Schwartz	Paprika (1932)	Carl Boese
Der Sprung in die Ehe	Max Reimann Otto Schwartz	Paprika (1933)	Jean de Limur
Der Sprung in die Ehe	Max Reimann Otto Schwartz	Paprika (1933)	Carl Boese
Der Sprung in die Ehe	Max Reimann Otto Schwartz	Paprika (1959)	Kurt Wilhelm
Der wahre Jakob (1924)	Franz Arnold; Ernst Bach	The True Jacob (1931)	Hans Steinhoff
Der wahre Jakob (1924)	Franz Arnold; Ernst Bach	Oh, Daddy! (1935)	Graham Cutts; Austin Melford
Der wahre Jakob (1924)	Franz Arnold; Ernst Bach	One Night Apart (1950)	Hans Deppe
Der wahre Jakob (1924)	Franz Arnold; Ernst Bach	The True Jacob (1960)	Rudolf Schündler
Der Weiberkrieg	Ludwig Anzengruber	The Women's War (1928)	Franz Seitz Sr.
Der Weibsteufel (1914)	Karl Schönherr	A Devil of a Woman (1951)	Wolfgang Liebeneiner
Der Weibsteufel (1914)	Karl Schönherr	Der Weibsteufel (1966)	Georg Tressler
Des Teufels General (1946)	Carl Zuckmayer	The Devil's General (1955)	Helmut Käutner
The Desert Song (1926)	Oscar Hammerstein II; Otto Harbach; Frank Mandel	The Desert Song (1929)	Roy Del Ruth
The Desert Song (1926)	Oscar Hammerstein II; Otto Harbach; Frank Mandel	The Desert Song (1943)	Robert Florey
The Desert Song (1926)	Oscar Hammerstein II; Otto Harbach; Frank Mandel	The Desert Song (1953)	H. Bruce Humberstone
Deserted at the Altar (1903)	Pierce Kingsley	Deserted at the Altar (1922)	William K. Howard
Design for Living (1932)	Noël Coward	Design for Living (1933)	Ernst Lubitsch
The Designated Mourner (1996)	Wallace Shawn	The Designated Mourner (1997)	David Hare
Désiré (1927)	Sacha Guitry	Désiré (1937)	Sacha Guitry
Désiré (1927)	Sacha Guitry	Désiré (1996)	Bernard Murat
Desire Under the Elms (1924)	Eugene O'Neill	Desire Under the Elms (1958)	Delbert Mann
Desk Set (1955)	William Marchant	Desk Set (1957)	Walter Lang
The Desperate Hours (1955)	Joseph Hayes	The Desperate Hours (1955)	William Wyler
The Desperate Hours (1955)	Joseph Hayes	Desperate Hours (1990)	Michael Cimino
Detective Story (1949)	Sidney Kingsley	Detective Story (1951)	William Wyler
Detention of the Dead (2009)	Rob Rinow	Detention of the Dead (2012)	Alex Craig Mann
The Devil (1907)	Ferenc Molnár	The Devil (1915)	Reginald Barker
The Devil (1907)	Ferenc Molnár	The Devil (1918)	Michael Curtiz
The Devil (1907)	Ferenc Molnár	The Devil (1921)	James Young
The Devil Was Sick	Jane Hinton	God's Gift to Women (1931)	Michael Curtiz
The Devil's Disciple (1897)	George Bernard Shaw	The Devil's Disciple (1959)	Guy Hamilton
The Devil's Disciple (1897)	George Bernard Shaw	The Devil's Disciple (1987)	David Jones
The Devil's Hornpipe (1953)	Maxwell Anderson; Rouben Mamoulian	Never Steal Anything Small (1959)	Charles Lederer
The Devils (1960)	John Whiting	The Devils (1971)	Ken Russell
Di Kreytser sonata (1902)	Jacob Gordin	The Kreutzer Sonata (1915)	Herbert Brenon
Dial M for Murder (1952)	Frederick Knott	Dial M for Murder (1954)	Alfred Hitchcock
Dial M for Murder (1952)	Frederick Knott	A Perfect Murder (1998)	Andrew Davis
The Diary of Anne Frank (1955)	Frances Goodrich; Albert Hackett	The Diary of Anne Frank (1959)	George Stevens
The Diary of Anne Frank (1955)	Frances Goodrich; Albert Hackett	The Diary of Anne Frank (1967)	Alex Segal
Diary of a Mad Black Woman (2001)	Tyler Perry	Diary of a Mad Black Woman (2005)	Darren Grant
Dicky Monteith (1904)	Tom Gallon; Leon M. Lion	Dicky Monteith (1922)	Kenelm Foss
The Dictator (1904)	Richard Harding Davis	The Dictator (1915)	Oscar Eagle
The Dictator (1904)	Richard Harding Davis	The Dictator (1922)	James Cruze
Die Affäre Dreyfus (1928)	Wilhelm Herzog; Hans Rehfisch	Dreyfus (1931)	Milton Rosmer; F. W. Kraemer
Die Ahnfrau (1817)	Franz Grillparzer	The Ancestress (1919)	Jacob Fleck
Die Bitteren Tränen der Petra von Kant (1971)	Rainer Werner Fassbinder	The Bitter Tears of Petra von Kant (1972)	Rainer Werner Fassbinder
Die Frau im Schrank	Octave Mirbeau; Soulié Dussieux de Chennevières	The Woman in the Cupboard (1927)	Rudolf Biebrach
Die große Pause (1915)	Oscar Blumenthal; Max Bernstein	The Long Intermission (1927)	Carl Froelich
Die Hochzeit von Valeni (1913)	Ludwig Ganghofer	The Wedding of Valeni (1914)	Jacob Fleck
Die keusche Susanne (1910)	Jean Gilbert; Georg Okonkowski	La Casta Susana (1944)	Benito Perojo
Die, Mommie, Die! (1999)	Charles Busch	Die, Mommie, Die! (2003)	Mark Rucker
Die Nacht vor dem Ultimo (1935)	Rudolf Lothar; Hans Adler	Folies Bergère de Paris (1935)	Roy Del Ruth
Die Nacht vor der Scheidung (1937)	Gina Kaus	The Night Before the Divorce (1942)	Robert Siodmak
Die Republik befiehlt (1927)	Rudolf Lothar; Fritz Gottwald	The Boudoir Diplomat (1930)	Malcolm St. Clair
Die Schönen Tage von Aranjuez	János Székely; Robert A. Stemmle	Happy Days in Aranjuez (1933)	Johannes Meyer
Die Schönen Tage von Aranjuez	János Székely; Robert A. Stemmle	Desire (1936)	Frank Borzage
Die Vertagte Hochzeitsnacht	Ernst Bach; Franz Arnold	The Interrupted Honeymoon (1936)	Leslie S. Hiscott
Die Zarin	Lajos Bíró; Melchior Lengyel	A Royal Scandal (1945)	Otto Preminger
Dimboola (1969)	Jack Hibberd	Dimboola (1979)	John Duigan
Dinner at Eight (1932)	George S. Kaufman; Edna Ferber	Dinner at Eight (1933)	George Cukor
Dinner at Eight (1932)	George S. Kaufman; Edna Ferber	Dinner at Eight (1989, TV)	Ron Lagomarsino
Dinner with Friends (1998)	Donald Margulies	Dinner with Friends (2001, TV)	Norman Jewison
Dionysus in 69 (1968)	Richard Schechner	Dionysus in '69 (1970)	Brian De Palma; Bruce Joel Rubin
Diplomatie (2011)	Cyril Gély	Diplomacy (2014)	Volker Schlöndorff
The Dippers (1922)	Ben Travers	The Chance of a Night Time (1931)	Herbert Wilcox
Disco Pigs (1996)	Enda Walsh	Disco Pigs (2001)	Kirsten Sheridan
Dishonored Lady (1930)	Edward Sheldon; Margaret Ayer Barnes	Dishonored Lady (1947)	Robert Stevenson
Disraeli (1911)	Louis N. Parker	Disraeli (1916)	Charles Calvert; Percy Nash
Disraeli (1911)	Louis N. Parker	Disraeli (1921)	Henry Kolker
Disraeli (1911)	Louis N. Parker	Disraeli (1929)	Alfred E. Green
Diversion (1927)	John Van Druten	The Careless Age (1929)	John Griffith Wray
Divinas palabras (1919)	'Ramón del Valle-Inclán	Divinas palabras (1977)	Juan Ibáñez
Divinas palabras (1919)	'Ramón del Valle-Inclán	Divine Words (1987)	José Luis García Sánchez
The Divorcee	Edgar Selwyn	The Primitive Lover (1922)	Sidney Franklin
Divorçons (1880)	Victorien Sardou; Émile de Najac	Let's Get a Divorce (1918)	Charles Giblyn
Divorçons (1880)	Victorien Sardou; Émile de Najac	Kiss Me Again (1925)	Ernst Lubitsch
Divorçons (1880)	Victorien Sardou; Émile de Najac	Don't Tell the Wife (1927)	Paul L. Stein
Divorçons (1880)	Victorien Sardou; Émile de Najac	That Uncertain Feeling (1941)	Ernst Lubitsch
Do Not Part with Your Beloved (1971)	Aleksandr Volodin	Do Not Part with Your Beloved (1980)	Pavel Arsenov
Doctor Faustus (1592)	Christopher Marlowe	Doctor Faustus (1967)	Richard Burton; Nevill Coghill
The Doctor's Dilemma (1906)	George Bernard Shaw	The Doctor's Dilemma (1958)	Anthony Asquith
Doctor X (1931)	Howard W Comstock; Allen C Miller	Doctor X (1932)	Michael Curtiz
Dodsworth (1934)	Sidney Howard	Dodsworth (1936)	William Wyler
The Dog in the Manger (1618)	Lope de Vega	The Dog in the Manger (1978)	Yan Frid
The Dog in the Manger (1618)	Lope de Vega	The Dog in the Manger (1996)	Pila Miró
Dois Perdidos numa Noite Suja	Plínio Marcos	Two Lost in a Dirty Night (2002)	José Joffily
A Doll's House (1879)	Henrik Ibsen	A Doll's House (1917)	Joseph De Grasse
A Doll's House (1879)	Henrik Ibsen	A Doll's House (1918)	Maurice Tourneur
A Doll's House (1879)	Henrik Ibsen	A Doll's House (1922)	Charles Bryant
A Doll's House (1879)	Henrik Ibsen	Nora (1923)	Berthold Viertel
A Doll's House (1879)	Henrik Ibsen	A Doll's House (1943)	Ernesto Arancibia
A Doll's House (1879)	Henrik Ibsen	Nora (1944)	Harald Braun
A Doll's House (1879)	Henrik Ibsen	A Doll's House (1959)	George Schaefer
A Doll's House (1879)	Henrik Ibsen	A Doll's House (1973)	Joseph Losey
A Doll's House (1879)	Henrik Ibsen	A Doll's House (1973)	Patrick Garland
A Doll's House (1879)	Henrik Ibsen	A Doll's House (1992)	David Thacker
A Doll's House (1879)	Henrik Ibsen	Sara (1992)	Dariush Mehrjui
Dom Juan (1665)	Molière	Don Juan in Hell (1991)	Gonzalo Suárez
Dom Juan (1665)	Molière	Don Juan (1998)	Jacques Weber
Domésticas	Renata Melo	Maids (2001)	Fernando Meirelles
The Dominant Sex (1935)	Michael Egan	The Dominant Sex (1937)	Herbert Brenon
Don Carlos (1787)	Friedrich Schiller	Carlos (1971)	Hans W. Geißendörfer
Don César de Bazan (1872)	Adolphe d'Ennery; Dumanoir; Jules Chantepie	Don Cesar, Count of Irun (1918)	Jacob Fleck; Luise Fleck
Don César de Bazan (1872)	Adolphe d'Ennery; Dumanoir; Jules Chantepie	Rosita (1923)	Ernst Lubitsch
Don César de Bazan (1872)	Adolphe d'Ennery; Dumanoir; Jules Chantepie	The Spanish Dancer (1923)	Herbert Brenon
Don César de Bazan (1872)	Adolphe d'Ennery; Dumanoir; Jules Chantepie	Don Cesare di Bazan (1942)	Riccardo Freda
Don Quintín, el amargao (1924)	Carlos Arniches; Antonio Estremera	Daughter of Deceit (1951)	Luis Buñuel
Don Quixote	Evgeny Schwartz	Don Quixote (1957)	Grigori Kozintsev
Don's Party (1971)	David Williamson	Don's Party (1976)	Bruce Beresford
Doña Clarines (1909)	Quintero brothers	Doña Clarines (1951)	Eduardo Ugarte
Don't Drink the Water (1966)	Woody Allen	Don't Drink the Water (1969)	Howard Morris
Don't Drink the Water (1966)	Woody Allen	Don't Drink the Water (1994)	Woody Allen
Don't Shoot At Angels	Miguel Mihura	You Don't Shoot at Angels (1960)	Rolf Thiele
Doppelselbstmord (1876)	Ludwig Anzengruber	Double Suicide (1918)	Jacob Fleck; Luise Fleck
Dora (1877)	Victorien Sardou	Diplomacy (1916)	Sidney Olcott
Dora (1877)	Victorien Sardou	Diplomacy (1926)	Marshall Neilan
Dora Nelson	Louis Verneuil	Dora Nelson (1935)	René Guissart
Dora Nelson	Louis Verneuil	Dora Nelson (1939)	Mario Soldati
Dorothea Angermann (1926)	Gerhart Hauptmann	Dorothea Angermann (1959)	Robert Siodmak
Double Door (1933)	Elizabeth A. McFadden	Double Door (1934)	Charles Vidor
Double Error (1935)	J. Lee Thompson	Murder Without Crime (1951)	J. Lee Thompson
The Double Event (1917)	Sidney Blow; Douglas Hoare	The Double Event (1921)	Kenelm Foss
Double Harness (1933)	Edward Poor Montgomery	Double Harness (1933)	John Cromwell
Doubt: A Parable (2004)	John Patrick Shanley	Doubt (2008)	John Patrick Shanley
The Doughgirls (1942)	Joseph Fields	The Doughgirls (1944)	James V. Kern
The Dove (1925)	Willard Mack	The Dove (1927)	Roland West
The Dove (1925)	Willard Mack	Girl of the Rio (1932)	Herbert Brenon
The Dove (1925)	Willard Mack	The Girl and the Gambler (1939)	Lew Landers
The Dover Road (1921)	A. A. Milne	The Little Adventuress (1927)	William C. deMille
The Dover Road (1921)	A. A. Milne	Where Sinners Meet (1934)	J. Walter Ruben
Down Hill (1926)	Ivor Novello; Constance Collier	Downhill (1927)	Alfred Hitchcock
Dracula (1924)	Hamilton Deane; John L. Balderston	Dracula (1931)	Tod Browning
Dracula (1924)	Hamilton Deane; John L. Balderston	Dracula (1931, Spanish language)	George Melford
Dracula (1924)	Hamilton Deane; John L. Balderston	Dracula (1979)	John Badham
Drake of England (1912)	Louis N. Parker	Drake of England (1935)	Arthur B. Woods
Drakon (1944)	Evgeny Schwartz	To Kill a Dragon (1989)	Mark Zakharov
The Drawer Boy (1999)	Michael Healey	The Drawer Boy (2017)	Arturo Pérez Torres
Dream Girl (1945)	Elmer Rice	Dream Girl (1948)	Mitchell Leisen
The Dream Girl	Willard Mack	Aladdin's Other Lamp (1917)	John H. Collins
A Dream Play (1901)	August Strindberg	Dreamplay (1994)	Unni Straume
The Dresser (1980)	Ronald Harwood	The Dresser (1983)	Peter Yates
The Dresser (1980)	Ronald Harwood	The Dresser (2015, TV)	Richard Eyre
Dr. Homer Speaks: Oh Ai-Lar-Tsua Farewell (1963)	Ric Throssell	The Sweet Sad Story of Elmo and Me (1965)	Henri Safran
Dr. Med. Hiob Prätorius (1932)	Curt Goetz	Doctor Praetorius (1950)	Karl Peter Gillmann
Dr. Med. Hiob Prätorius (1932)	Curt Goetz	People Will Talk (1951)	Joseph L. Mankiewicz
Dr. Med. Hiob Prätorius (1932)	Curt Goetz	Praetorius (1965)	Kurt Hoffmann
Drifting (1910)	John Colton; Daisy H. Andrews	Drifting (1923)	Tod Browning
Drifting (1910)	John Colton; Daisy H. Andrews	Shanghai Lady (1929)	John S. Robertson
Driving Miss Daisy (1987)	Alfred Uhry	Driving Miss Daisy (1989)	Bruce Beresford
Driving Miss Daisy (1987)	Alfred Uhry	Driving Miss Daisy (2014)	David Esbjornson
Dry Rot (1954)	John Chapman	Dry Rot (1956)	Maurice Elvey
Du Barry (1901)	David Belasco	DuBarry (1915)	Edoardo Bencivenga
Du Barry (1901)	David Belasco	Du Barry, Woman of Passion (1930)	Sam Taylor
Du Barry Was a Lady (1939)	Herbert Fields; Buddy DeSylva	Du Barry Was a Lady (1943)	Roy Del Ruth
The Duchess of Benameji (1932)	Antonio Machado; Manuel Machado	The Duchess of Benameji (1949)	Luis Lucia
Duet for One (1980)	Tom Kempinski	Duet for One (1986)	Andrei Konchalovsky
Dulcinée (1938)	Gaston Baty	Dulcinea (1963)	Vicente Escrivá
Dulcy (1920)	George S. Kaufman; Marc Connelly	Dulcy (1923)	Sidney Franklin
Dulcy (1920)	George S. Kaufman; Marc Connelly	Not So Dumb (1930)	King Vidor
Dulcy (1920)	George S. Kaufman; Marc Connelly	Dulcy (1940)	S. Sylvan Simon
Dusty Ermine (1936)	Neil F. Grant	Dusty Ermine (1936)	Bernard Vorhaus
Dutchman (1964)	Amiri Baraka	Dutchman (1966)	Anthony Harvey
The Dybbuk (1916)	S. An-sky	The Dybbuk (1938)	Michał Waszyński
The Dying Gaul (1998)	Craig Lucas	The Dying Gaul (2005)	Craig Lucas

=== E ===
Play	Playwright	Film	Film director
Earth Spirit (1895)	Frank Wedekind	Earth Spirit (1923)	Leopold Jessner
Earth Spirit (1895)	Frank Wedekind	Pandora's Box (1929)	G. W. Pabst
The Easiest Way (1909)	Eugene Walter	The Easiest Way (1917)	Albert Capellani
The Easiest Way (1909)	Eugene Walter	The Easiest Way (1931)	Jack Conway
East Is East	Philip Hubbard; Gwendolyn Logan	East Is East (1916)	Henry Edwards
East Is East (1996)	Ayub Khan Din	East Is East (1999)	Damien O'Donnell
East Is West (1918)	Samuel Shipman; John B. Hymer	East Is West (1922)	Sidney Franklin
East Is West (1918)	Samuel Shipman; John B. Hymer	East Is West (1930)	Monta Bell
East of Suez (1922)	W. Somerset Maugham	East of Suez (1925)	Raoul Walsh
Easy Money (1948)	Arnold Ridley	Easy Money (1948)	Bernard Knowles
Easy Virtue (1925)	Noël Coward	Easy Virtue (1928)	Alfred Hitchcock
Easy Virtue (1925)	Noël Coward	Easy Virtue (2008)	Stephan Elliott
Edhir Neechal	K. Balachander	Edhir Neechal (1968)	K. Balachander
Edmond (1982)	David Mamet	Edmond (2005)	Stuart Gordon
Educating Rita (1980)	Willy Russell	Educating Rita (1983)	Lewis Gilbert
Éducation de prince (1900)	Maurice Donnay	Education of a Prince (1927)	Henri Diamant-Berger
The Education of Elizabeth (1907)	Roy Horniman	The Education of Elizabeth (1921)	Edward Dillon
The Education of Mr. Pipp (1905)	Augustus Thomas; Charles Dana Gibson	Education of Mr. Pipp (1914)	William F. Haddock
Edward II (1592)	Christopher Marlowe	Edward II (1991)	Derek Jarman
Edward, My Son (1947)	Noel Langley; Robert Morley	Edward, My Son (1949)	George Cukor
The Effect of Gamma Rays on Man-in-the-Moon Marigolds (1965)	Paul Zindel	The Effect of Gamma Rays on Man-in-the-Moon Marigolds (1971)	Paul Newman
Egor Bulychev (1932)	Maxim Gorky	Yegor Bulychov and Others (1953)	Yuliya Solntseva
Egor Bulychev (1932)	Maxim Gorky	Yegor Bulychyov and Others (1971)	Sergei Solovyov
Egy, kettő, három (1929)	Ferenc Molnár	One, Two, Three (1961)	Billy Wilder
Egypt (1912)	Edward Sheldon	The Call of Her People (1917)	John W. Noble
Ein Walzertraum (1907)	Leopold Jacobson; Felix Dörmann	Magic Waltz (1918)	Michael Curtiz
Ein Walzertraum (1907)	Leopold Jacobson; Felix Dörmann	The Smiling Lieutenant (1931)	Ernst Lubitsch
Ékszerrablás a Váci utcában (1931)	Ladislas Fodor	Jewel Robbery (1932)	William Dieterle
El centroforward murió al amanecer (1955)	Agustín Cuzzani	That Forward Center Died at Dawn (1961)	René Mugica
El mètode Grönholm (2003)	Jordi Galceran	The Method (2005)	Marcelo Piñeyro
El Padre Pitillo (1937)	Carlos Arniches	Father Cigarette (1946)	Roberto de Ribón
El Padre Pitillo (1937)	Carlos Arniches	Father Cigarette (1955)	Juan de Orduña
El Pez que Fuma (1968)	Román Chalbaud	El Pez que Fuma (1977)	Román Chalbaud
El plebiscito	Antonio Skármeta	No (2012)	Pablo Larraín
Elckerlijc (1495)	Peter van Diest	Elckerlyc (1975)	Jos Stelling
The Elder Son (1969)	Alexander Vampilov	The Elder Son (2006)	Maryus Vaysberg
Electra (413 BC)	Euripides	Electra (1962)	Michael Cacoyannis
The Elephant Man (1977)	Bernard Pomerance	The Elephant Man (1982)	Jack Hofsiss
Eles Não Usam Black-Tie (1958)	Gianfranco Guarnieri	They Don't Wear Black Tie (1981)	Leon Hirszman
Elevator	Patrick James Carson	9/11 (2017)	Martin Guigui
The Eleventh Commandment (1921)	Brandon Fleming	The Eleventh Commandment (1924)	George A. Cooper
The Eleventh Commandment (1921)	Brandon Fleming	The Eleventh Commandment (1933)	George Melford
Elizabeth the Queen (1930)	Maxwell Anderson	The Private Lives of Elizabeth and Essex (1939)	Michael Curtiz
Elmer, the Great (1928)	George M. Cohan; Ring Lardner	Fast Company (1929)	A. Edward Sutherland
Elmer, the Great (1928)	George M. Cohan; Ring Lardner	Elmer, the Great (1933)	Mervyn LeRoy
Embrassez-moi	Tristan Bernard; Yves Mirande	Kiss Me (1929)	Robert Péguy
Embrassez-moi	Tristan Bernard; Yves Mirande	Kiss Me (1932)	Léon Mathot
Emerald City (1987)	David Williamson	Emerald City (1988)	Michael Jenkins
Emilia Galotti (1772)	Gotthold Ephraim Lessing	Emilia Galotti (1958)	Martin Hellberg
Emmett Stone (1982)	Michael Gurr	Emmett Stone (1985)	Elizabeth Alexander
The Emperor Jones (1920)	Eugene O'Neill	The Emperor Jones (1933)	Dudley Murphy
The Enchanted Cottage (1921)	Arthur Wing Pinero	The Enchanted Cottage (1924)	John S. Robertson
The Enchanted Cottage (1921)	Arthur Wing Pinero	The Enchanted Cottage (1945)	John Cromwell
End as a Man (1953)	Calder Willingham	The Strange One (1957)	Jack Garfein
End of the Rainbow (2005)	Peter Quilter	Judy (2019)	Rupert Goold
An Enemy of the People (1882)	Henrik Ibsen	An Enemy of the People (1937)	Hans Steinhoff
An Enemy of the People (1882)	Henrik Ibsen	An Enemy of the People (1958)	Royston Morley
An Enemy of the People (1882)	Henrik Ibsen	An Enemy of the People (1978)	George Schaefer
An Enemy of the People (1882)	Henrik Ibsen	Ganashatru (1990)	Satyajit Ray
An Enemy to the King (1896)	Robert Neilson Stephens	An Enemy to the King (1916)	Frederick A. Thomson
Enter Laughing (1963)	Carl Reiner	Enter Laughing (1967)	Carl Reiner
Enter Madame (1920)	Gilda Varesi; Dolly Byrne	Enter Madame (1922)	Wallace Worsley
Enter Madame (1935)	Elliott Nugent		
The Entertainer (1957)	John Osborne	The Entertainer (1960)	Tony Richardson
Entertaining Mr Sloane (1963)	Joe Orton	Entertaining Mr Sloane (1970)	Douglas Hickox
Equus (1973)	Peter Shaffer	Equus (1977)	Sidney Lumet
Erik XIV	August Strindberg	Karin Månsdotter (1954)	Alf Sjöberg
Escanaba in da Moonlight (1995)	Jeff Daniels	Escanaba in da Moonlight (2001)	Jeff Daniels
Escapade (1952)	Roger MacDougall	Escapade (1955)	Philip Leacock
Escape (1926)	John Galsworthy	Escape! (1930)	Basil Dean
Escape (1926)	John Galsworthy	Escape (1948)	Joseph L. Mankiewicz
The Escape (1913)	Paul Armstrong	The Escape (1914)	D. W. Griffith
The Escape (1913)	Paul Armstrong	The Escape (1928)	Richard Rosson
Escape Me Never (1934)	Margaret Kennedy	Escape Me Never (1935)	Paul Czinner
Escape Me Never (1934)	Margaret Kennedy	Escape Me Never (1947)	Peter Godfrey
Esmeralda (1881)	Frances Hodgson Burnett	Esmeralda	James Kirkwood Sr.
Espionage (1935)	Walter Hackett	Espionage (1937)	Kurt Neumann
The Eternal City (1902)	Hall Caine	The Eternal City (1915)	Edwin S. Porter; Hugh Ford
The Eternal City (1902)	Hall Caine	The Eternal City (1923)	George Fitzmaurice
Étienne (1930)	Jacques Deval	Étienne (1933)	Jean Tarride
Eurydice (1941)	Jean Anouilh	You Ain't Seen Nothin' Yet (2012)	Alain Resnais
Eva the Fifth (1928)	Kenyon Nicholson; John Golden	The Girl in the Show (1929)	Edgar Selwyn
The Eve of St. Mark (1942)	Maxwell Anderson	The Eve of St. Mark (1944)	John M. Stahl
Eve's Daughter (1917)	Alicia Ramsey	Eve's Daughter (1918)	James Kirkwood Sr.
Evensong (1932)	Beverley Nichols; Edward Knoblock	Evensong (1934)	Victor Saville
Events While Guarding the Bofors Gun (1966)	John McGrath	The Bofors Gun (1968)	Jack Gold
The Ever Open Door (1913)	George R. Sims	The Ever Open Door (1920)	Fred Goodwins
Everybody Comes to Rick's (1940)	Murray Burnett; Joan Alison	Casablanca (1942)	Michael Curtiz
Everynight ... Everynight (1985)	Ray Mooney	Everynight ... Everynight (1994)	Alkinos Tsilimidos
Everywoman (1911)	Walter Browne	Everywoman (1919)	George Melford
Evidence (1914)	Jeanie MacPherson (as J. du Rocher MacPherson); L. du Rocher MacPherson	Evidence (1915)	Edwin August
Evidence (1914)	Jeanie MacPherson (as J. du Rocher MacPherson); L. du Rocher MacPherson	Evidence (1929)	John G. Adolfi
The Evolution of Katherine (1914)	E. Temple Thurston	Driven (1916)	Maurice Elvey
Excess Baggage (1927)	John McGowan	Excess Baggage (1928)	James Cruze
Excuse Me (1911)	Rupert Hughes	Excuse Me (1925)	Alfred J. Goulding
The Expensive Halo (1931)	Josephine Tey	Youthful Folly (1934)	Miles Mander
Experience (1914)	George V. Hobart	Experience (1921)	George Fitzmaurice
Extremities (1982)	William Mastrosimone	Extremities (1986)	Robert M. Young
Eyes of Youth (1917)	Max Marcin; Charles Guernon	Eyes of Youth (1919)	Albert Parker
Eyes of Youth (1917)	Max Marcin; Charles Guernon	The Love of Sunya (1927)	Albert Parker

=== F ===
Play	Playwright	Film	Film director
The Face at the Window (1897)	F. Brooke Warren	The Face at the Window (1919)	Charles Villiers
The Face at the Window (1897)	F. Brooke Warren	The Face at the Window (1920)	Wilfred Noy
The Face at the Window (1897)	F. Brooke Warren	The Face at the Window (1932)	Leslie S. Hiscott
The Face at the Window (1897)	F. Brooke Warren	The Face at the Window (1939)	George King
The Face of Jizo (1994)	Hisashi Inoue	The Face of Jizo (2004)	Kazuo Kuroki
Face to Face (2000)	David Williamson	Face to Face (2011)	Michael Rymer
Fair and Warmer (1915)	Avery Hopwood	Fair and Warmer (1919)	Henry Otto
Fair and Warmer (1915)	Avery Hopwood	The Model Husband (1937)	Wolfgang Liebeneiner
Fair and Warmer (1915)	Avery Hopwood	The Model Husband (1956)	Erik Ode
Fair and Warmer (1915)	Avery Hopwood	The Model Husband (1959)	Karl Suter
Fair and Warmer (1915)	Avery Hopwood	Den grønne heisen (1981)	Odd-Geir Sæther
The Fair Co-Ed (1908)	George Ade	The Fair Co-Ed (1927)	Sam Wood
Fairy Tales of the Old Arbat (1968)	Aleksei Arbuzov	Fairy tales... fairy tales... fairy tales of the old Arbat (1982)	Savva Kulish
The Faith Healer (1909)	William Vaughn Moody	The Faith Healer (1921)	George Melford
The Fake (1924)	Frederick Lonsdale	The Fake (1927)	Georg Jacoby
The Fakers	E. Lewis Waller (using the pseudonym Tod Waller)	Find the Lady (1936)	Roland Grillette
The Fall Guy (1925)	George Abbott; James Gleason	The Fall Guy (1930)	Leslie Pearce
Fame (1929)	Audrey Carter; Waverly Carter	A Notorious Affair (1930)	Lloyd Bacon
Family Surprise	Cheung Tat-ming	A Home with a View (2019)	Herman Yau
The Famous Mrs. Fair (1919)	James Forbes	The Famous Mrs. Fair (1923)	Fred Niblo
Fando y Lis (1962)	Fernando Arrabal	Fando y Lis (1968)	Alejandro Jodorowsky
Fanny (1931)	Marcel Pagnol	Fanny (1932)	Marc Allégret
Fanny (1931)	Marcel Pagnol	Fanny (1933)	Mario Almirante
Fanny (1931)	Marcel Pagnol	The Black Whale (1934)	Fritz Wendhausen
Fanny (1931)	Marcel Pagnol	Port of Seven Seas (1938)	James Whale
Fanny (1931)	Marcel Pagnol	Fanny (1961)	Joshua Logan
Fanny (1931)	Marcel Pagnol	Fanny (2013)	Daniel Auteuil
The Far Cry (1924)	Arthur Richman	The Far Cry (1926)	Silvano Balboni
The Far Side of the Moon (2000)	Robert Lepage	Far Side of the Moon (2003)	Robert Lepage
The Farmer Takes a Wife (1934)	Marc Connelly; Frank B. Elser	The Farmer Takes a Wife (1935)	Victor Fleming
The Farmer Takes a Wife (1934)	Marc Connelly; Frank B. Elser	The Farmer Takes a Wife (1953)	Henry Levin
The Farmer's Wife (1916)	Eden Phillpotts	The Farmer's Wife (1928)	Alfred Hitchcock
Farragut North (2008)	Beau Willimon	The Ides of March (2011)	George Clooney
Fashions for Men	Ferenc Molnár	Fine Clothes (1925)	John M. Stahl
Fast Life (1928)	Samuel Shipman	Fast Life (1929)	John Francis Dillon
The Father (1887)	August Strindberg	Pita (1991)	Govind Nihalani
The Faun (1911)	Edward Knoblock	Faun (1918)	Alexander Korda
The Faun (1911)	Edward Knoblock	The Marriage Maker (1923)	William C. deMille
Faust (1808)	Johann Wolfgang von Goethe	Faust (1926)	F. W. Murnau
Faust (1808)	Johann Wolfgang von Goethe	The Legend of Faust (1949)	Carmine Gallone
Faust (1808)	Johann Wolfgang von Goethe	Faust (1960)	Peter Gorski
Faust (1808)	Johann Wolfgang von Goethe	Faust (1994)	Jan Švankmajer
Faust (1808)	Johann Wolfgang von Goethe	Faust (2011)	Alexander Sokurov
Faust (1808)	Johann Wolfgang von Goethe	Faustina (1957)	José Luis Sáenz de Heredia
Faust (1808)	Johann Wolfgang von Goethe	Fausto 5.0 (2001)	Àlex Ollé
Feature for June	Eileen Tighe; Graeme Lorimer	June Bride (1948)	Bretaigne Windust
Fédora (1882)	Victorien Sardou	White Nights (1916)	Alexander Korda
Fédora (1882)	Victorien Sardou	Fedora (1918)	Edward José
Fédora (1882)	Victorien Sardou	Fedora (1926)	Jean Manoussi
Fédora (1882)	Victorien Sardou	The Woman from Moscow (1928)	Ludwig Berger
Fédora (1882)	Victorien Sardou	Fedora (1934)	Louis J. Gasnier
Fédora (1882)	Victorien Sardou	Fedora (1942)	Camillo Mastrocinque
Felix Gets a Month (1917)	Tom Gallon	The Naked Man (1923)	Henry Edwards
Fences (1985)	August Wilson	Fences (2016)	Denzel Washington
Ferréol (1875)	Victorien Sardou	A Night of Mystery (1928)	Lothar Mendes
The Fever (1990)	Wallace Shawn; Carlo Gabriel Nero	The Fever (2004)	Carlo Gabriel Nero
A Few Good Men (1989)	Aaron Sorkin	A Few Good Men (1992)	Rob Reiner
The Field (1965)	John B. Keane	The Field (1990)	Jim Sheridan
Fifty-Fifty (1932)	H. F. Maltby	Just My Luck (1933)	Jack Raymond
Fifty Million Frenchmen (1929)	Herbert Fields	50 Million Frenchmen (1931)	Lloyd Bacon
The Fighting Hope (1908)	William James Hurlbut	The Fighting Hope (1915)	George Melford
Filumena Marturano (1946)	Eduardo De Filippo	Filomena Marturano (1950)	Luis Mottura
Filumena Marturano (1946)	Eduardo De Filippo	Marriage Italian Style (1964)	Vittorio De Sica
The Fire Patrol	James W. Harkins; Edwin Barbour	The Fire Patrol (1924)	Hunt Stromberg
Fires of Fate (1909)	Sir Arthur Conan Doyle	Fires of Fate (1923)	Tom Terriss
Fires of Fate (1909)	Sir Arthur Conan Doyle	Fires of Fate (1932)	Norman Walker
Fires of St. John (1900)	Hermann Sudermann	Midsummer Night's Fire (1939)	Arthur Maria Rabenalt
The First and the Last	John Galsworthy	21 Days (1941)	Basil Dean
The First Gentleman (1945)	Norman Ginsbury	The First Gentleman (1948)	Alberto Cavalcanti
First Lady (1935)	George S. Kaufman; Katharine Dayton	First Lady (1937)	Stanley Logan
First Monday in October (1978)	Jerome Lawrence; Robert E. Lee	First Monday in October (1981)	Ronald Neame
The First Mrs. Chiverick	Adelaide Matthews	Scrambled Wives (1921)	Edward H. Griffith
The First Mrs. Fraser (1929)	St. John Greer Ervine	The First Mrs. Fraser (1932)	Sinclair Hill; Thorold Dickinson
The First Wife	Jay Presson Allen	Wives and Lovers (1963)	John Rich
The First Year (1920)	Frank Craven	The First Year (1926)	Frank Borzage
The First Year (1920)	Frank Craven	The First Year (1932)	William K. Howard
Fit (2008)	Rikki Beadle-Blair	Fit (2010)	Rikki Beadle-Blair
Five Evenings (1959)	Aleksandr Volodin	Five Evenings (1978)	Nikita Mikhalkov
Five Finger Exercise (1958)	Peter Shaffer	Five Finger Exercise (1962)	Daniel Mann
Five on the Black Hand Side (1969)	Charlie L. Russell	Five on the Black Hand Side (1973)	Oscar Williams
Five Star Final (1930)	Louis Weitzenkorn	Five Star Final (1931)	Mervyn LeRoy
Five Star Final (1930)	Louis Weitzenkorn	Two Against the World (1936)	William C. McGann
Fjalla-Eyvindur (1911)	Jóhann Sigurjónsson	The Outlaw and His Wife (1918)	Victor Sjöström
The Flag Lieutenant (1908)	William Price Drury	The Flag Lieutenant (1926)	Maurice Elvey
The Flag Lieutenant (1908)	William Price Drury	The Flag Lieutenant (1932)	Henry Edwards
Flamingo Road (1946)	Robert Wilder; Sally Wilder	Flamingo Road (1949)	Michael Curtiz
Flapper Wives	Jane Cowl; Jane Murfin	Flapper Wives (1924)	Justin H. McCloskey
Flare Path (1942)	Terence Rattigan	The Way to the Stars (1945)	Anthony Asquith
A Flea in Her Ear (1907)	Georges Feydeau	A Flea in Her Ear (1968)	Jacques Charon
Flight (1927)	Mikhail Bulgakov	The Flight (1970)	Aleksandr Alov; Vladimir Naumov
Florette e Patapon (1905)	Maurice Hennequin; Pierre Veber	Floretta and Patapon (1913)	Mario Caserini
Florette e Patapon (1905)	Maurice Hennequin; Pierre Veber	Floretta and Patapon (1927)	Amleto Palermi
A Florida Enchantment (1896)	Fergus Redmond; Archibald Clavering Gunter	A Florida Enchantment (1914)	Sidney Drew
Fly Away Home (1935)	Dorothy Bennett; Irving White	Daughters Courageous (1939)	Michael Curtiz
Fly Away Home (1935)	Dorothy Bennett; Irving White	Always in My Heart (1942)	Jo Graham
Flying Down to Rio (1933)	Anne Caldwell	Flying Down to Rio (1933)	Thornton Freeland
Fog (1927)	John Willard	Black Waters (1929)	Marshall Neilan
Follow Thru (1929)	Lew Brown; B.G. DeSylva; Laurence Schwab	Follow Thru (1930)	Lloyd Corrigan; Laurence Schwab
The Fool (1922)	Channing Pollock	The Fool (1925)	Harry F. Millarde
Fool for Love (1983)	Sam Shepard	Fool for Love (1985)	Robert Altman
A Fool There Was (1909)	Porter Emerson Browne	A Fool There Was (1915)	Frank Powell
Footsteps (2003)	Ira Levin	Footsteps (2003)	John Badham
Footsteps in the Dark (1935)	Ladislas Fodor	Footsteps in the Dark (1941)	Lloyd Bacon
For Colored Girls Who Have Considered Suicide / When the Rainbow Is Enuf (1976)	Ntozake Shange	For Colored Girls Who Have Considered Suicide / When the Rainbow Is Enuf (1982)	Oz Scott
For Colored Girls Who Have Considered Suicide / When the Rainbow Is Enuf (1976)	For Colored Girls (2010)	For Colored Girls Who Have Considered Suicide / When the Rainbow Is Enuf (1982)	Tyler Perry
For the Defense (1919)	Elmer Rice	For the Defense (1922)	Paul Powell
For the Love of Mike (1931)	H. F. Maltby; Clifford Grey	For the Love of Mike (1932)	Monty Banks
For Love or Money (1947)	F. Hugh Herbert	This Happy Feeling (1959)	Blake Edwards
For the Sake of the Family (1929)	Charles Webb	Heading for Heaven (1947)	Lewis D. Collins
Forever Plaid (1989)	Stuart Ross	Forever Plaid: The Movie (2008)	Stuart Ross
Forgotten Melody for a Flute	Eldar Ryazanov; Emil Braginsky	Forgotten Melody for a Flute (1987)	Eldar Ryazanov
Fortunato	Quintero brothers	Fortunato (1942)	Fernando Delgado
Fortune and Men's Eyes (1967)	John Herbert	Fortune and Men's Eyes (1971)	Harvey Hart
The Fortune Hunter (1909)	Winchell Smith	The Fortune Hunter (1914)	Barry O'Neil
The Fortune Hunter (1909)	Winchell Smith	The Fortune Hunter (1920)	Tom Terriss
The Fortune Hunter (1909)	Winchell Smith	The Fortune Hunter (1927)	Charles Reisner
Fortune's Fool (1848)	Ivan Turgenev	The Boarder (1953)	Vladimir Basov
Forty Carats	Jay Presson Allen	40 Carats (1973)	Milton Katselas
Four (1998)	Christopher Shinn	Four (2012)	Joshua Sanchez
Four Cents a Word (1937)	John Cecil Holm	Blonde Inspiration (1941)	Busby Berkeley
Four Walls (1927)	George Abbott; Dana Burnet	Four Walls (1928)	William Nigh
Four Walls (1927)	George Abbott; Dana Burnet	Straight Is the Way (1934)	Paul Sloane
The Fourposter (1951)	Jan de Hartog	The Four Poster (1952)	Irving Reis
The Fourposter (1951)	Jan de Hartog	The Four Poster (1964)	James Upshaw
The Fourth Wall (1928, also known as The Perfect Alibi)	A. A. Milne	Birds of Prey (1930)	Basil Dean
Foxfire (1982)	Susan Cooper; Hume Cronyn	Foxfire(1987)	Jud Taylor
Fra Diavolo (1830)	Eugène Scribe	The Devil's Brother (1933)	Hal Roach; Charley Rogers
Frankenstein (1927)	Webling	Frankenstein (1931)	Whale
Frankenstein Project (2007)	Kornél Mundruczó	Tender Son: The Frankenstein Project (2010)	Kornél Mundruczó
Frankie and Johnny in the Clair de Lune (1987)	Terrence McNally	Frankie and Johnny (1991)	Garry Marshall
A Free Soul (1928)	Willard Mack	A Free Soul (1931)	Clarence Brown
A Free Soul (1928)	Willard Mack	The Girl Who Had Everything (1953)	Richard Thorpe
The Freedom of the Seas (1918)	Walter Hackett	Freedom of the Seas (1934)	Marcel Varnel
Freiwild (1896)	Arthur Schnitzler	Fair Game (1928)	Forest Holger-Madsen
French Kiss	Candace Chong	Heaven in the Dark (2016)	Steve Yuen
French Leave (1920)	Reginald Berkeley	French Leave (1930)	Jack Raymond
French Leave (1920)	Reginald Berkeley	French Leave (1937)	Norman Lee
The French Mistress (1955)	Sonnie Hale	A French Mistress (1960)	Roy Boulting
Fric-Frac (1936)	Édouard Bourdet	Fric-Frac (1939)	Maurice Lehmann; Claude Autant-Lara
Friederike (1928)	Ludwig Herzer; Fritz Löhner-Beda	Frederica (1932)	Fritz Friedmann-Frederich
Friendly Enemies (1918)	Aaron Hoffman; Samuel Shipman	Friendly Enemies (1925)	George Melford
Friendly Enemies (1918)	Aaron Hoffman; Samuel Shipman	Friendly Enemies (1942)	Allan Dwan
Friends (1967)	Kōbō Abe	Friends	Kjell-Åke Andersson
Friends and Neighbours (1958)	Austin Steele	Friends and Neighbours (1959)	Gordon Parry
Frisco Kate	Mae West	Klondike Annie (1936)	Raoul Walsh
The Frisky Mrs. Johnson (1903)	Clyde Fitch	The Frisky Mrs. Johnson (1921)	Edward Dillon
From Hell to Heaven	Lawrence Hazard	From Hell to Heaven (1933)	Erle C. Kenton
From Morning to Midnight (1912)	Georg Kaiser	From Morn to Midnight (1920)	Karlheinz Martin
The Front Page (1928)	Ben Hecht; Charles MacArthur	The Front Page (1931)	Lewis Milestone
The Front Page (1928)	Ben Hecht; Charles MacArthur	His Girl Friday (1940)	Howard Hawks
The Front Page (1928)	Ben Hecht; Charles MacArthur	The Front Page (1974)	Billy Wilder
The Front Page (1928)	Ben Hecht; Charles MacArthur	Switching Channels (1988)	Ted Kotcheff
Frost/Nixon (2006)	Peter Morgan	Frost/Nixon (2008)	Ron Howard
Frou-Frou	Henri Meilhac; Ludovic Halevy	A Hungry Heart (1917)	Emile Chautard
The Fugitives	Walter Hackett	Love Under Fire (1937)	George Marshall
Fun	James Bosley	Fun (1994)	Rafal Zielinski
Funny Money (1994)	Ray Cooney	Funny Money (2006)	Leslie Greif
The Furies (1928)	Zoe Akins	The Furies (1930)	Alan Crosland

=== G ===
Play	Playwright	Film	Film director
The Galley Slave (1879)	Bartley Campbell	The Galley Slave (1915)	J. Gordon Edwards
The Gamblers (1910)	Charles Klein	The Gamblers (1929)	Michael Curtiz
Gambling (1929)	George M. Cohan	Gambling (1934)	Rowland V. Lee
The Game (1916)	Harold Brighouse	The Winning Goal (1920)	G. B. Samuelson
The Game of Love and Chance (1730)	Pierre de Marivaux	Monsieur Hector (1940)	Maurice Cammage
The Garden of Eden (1927)	Rudolf Bernauer; Rudolf Österreicher; Avery Hopwood	The Garden of Eden (1928)	Lewis Milestone
Garden of Weeds (1924)	Leon Gordon; Doris Marquette	The Garden of Weeds (1924)	James Cruze
Gas Light (1938)	Patrick Hamilton	Gaslight (1940)	Thorold Dickinson
Gas Light (1938)	Patrick Hamilton	Gaslight (1944)	George Cukor
Gastone (1924)	Ettore Petrolini	Gastone (1960)	Mario Bonnard
The Gay Adventure (1931)	Walter Hackett	The Gay Adventure (1936)	Sinclair Hill
The Gay Lord Quex (1899)	Arthur Wing Pinero	The Gay Lord Quex	Maurice Elvey
The Gazebo (1958)	Alec Coppel	The Gazebo (1959)	George Marshall
The Gazebo (1958)	Alec Coppel	Jo (1971)	Jean Girault
The General (Hungarian: A tábornok) (1928)	Lajos Zilahy	The Virtuous Sin (1930)	George Cukor; Louis J. Gasnier
The General (Hungarian: A tábornok) (1928)	Lajos Zilahy	The Rebel (1931)	Adelqui Migliar
The General (Hungarian: A tábornok) (1928)	Lajos Zilahy	The Night of Decision (1931)	Dimitri Buchowetzki
General Court Martial	William M. Rankin	South Sea Woman (1953)	Arthur Lubin
General John Regan (1913)	George A. Birmingham	General John Regan (1933)	Henry Edwards
General Post (1917)	J. E. Harold Terry	General Post (1920)	Thomas Bentley
The Gentle Gunman (1950)	Roger MacDougall	The Gentle Gunman (1952)	Basil Dearden
The Gentle People (1939)	Irwin Shaw	Out of the Fog (1941)	Anatole Litvak
A Gentleman of Leisure (1911)	P. G. Wodehouse; John Stapleton	A Gentleman of Leisure (1915)	George Melford
A Gentleman of Leisure (1911)	P. G. Wodehouse; John Stapleton	A Gentleman of Leisure (1923)	Joseph Henabery
Gentlemen of the Press (1928)	Ward Morehouse	Gentlemen of the Press (1929)	Millard Webb
George Washington Jr. (1906)	George M. Cohan	George Washington Jr. (1924)	Malcolm St. Clair
George Washington Slept Here (1940)	Moss Hart; George S. Kaufman	George Washington Slept Here (1942)	William Keighley
Gertrud (1906)	Hjalmar Söderberg	Gertrud (1964)	Carl Theodor Dreyer
Geschäft mit Amerika	Paul Franck; Ludwig Hirschfeld	A Bit of Love (1932)	Max Neufeld
Geschäft mit Amerika	Paul Franck; Ludwig Hirschfeld	Monsieur, Madame and Bibi (1932)	Jean Boyer; Max Neufeld
Geschäft mit Amerika	Paul Franck; Ludwig Hirschfeld	Two Happy Hearts (1932)	Baldassarre Negroni
Geschäft mit Amerika	Paul Franck; Ludwig Hirschfeld	Yes, Mr Brown (1933)	Herbert Wilcox
Gestern und heute (1930)	Christa Winsloe	Mädchen in Uniform (1931)	Leontine Sagan
Gestern und heute (1930)	Christa Winsloe	Girls in Uniform (1951)	Alfredo B. Crevenna
Getting Gertie's Garter (1921)	Wilson Collison; Avery Hopwood	Getting Gertie's Garter (1927)	E. Mason Hopper
Getting Gertie's Garter (1921)	Wilson Collison; Avery Hopwood	Night of the Garter (1933)	Jack Raymond
Getting Gertie's Garter (1921)	Wilson Collison; Avery Hopwood	Getting Gertie's Garter (1945)	Allan Dwan
Getting Together (1918)	Ian Hay; J. Hartley Manners; Percival Knight	The Common Cause (1919)	J. Stuart Blackton
The Ghost Breaker (1909)	Paul Dickey and Charles W. Goddard	The Ghost Breaker (1914)	Cecil B. DeMille; Oscar C. Apfel
The Ghost Breaker (1909)	Paul Dickey and Charles W. Goddard	The Ghost Breaker (1922)	Alfred E. Green
The Ghost Breaker (1909)	Paul Dickey and Charles W. Goddard	The Ghost Breakers (1940)	George Marshall
The Ghost Breaker (1909)	Paul Dickey and Charles W. Goddard	Scared Stiff (1953)	George Marshall
Ghost in the Machine (1996)	David Gilman	Bad Manners (1997)	Jonathan Kaufer
The Ghost Train (1923)	Arnold Ridley	Ghost Train (1927)	Géza von Bolváry
The Ghost Train (1923)	Arnold Ridley	The Ghost Train (1931)	Walter Forde
The Ghost Train (1923)	Arnold Ridley	Oh, Mr Porter! (1937)	Marcel Varnel
The Ghost Train (1923)	Arnold Ridley	De Spooktrein (1939)	Carl Lamac
The Ghost Train (1923)	Arnold Ridley	The Ghost Train (1941)	Walter Forde
The Ghost Train (1923)	Arnold Ridley	Ghost Train International (1976)	Bent Christensen
Ghosts (1881)	Henrik Ibsen	Ghosts (1915)	George Nichols
The Ghoul	Frank King	The Ghoul (1933)	T. Hayes Hunter
Gideon (1961)	Paddy Chayefsky	Gideon (1971)	George Schaefer
Gideon's Blues (2004)	George Boyd	The Gospel According to the Blues (2010)	Thom Fitzgerald
The Gin Game (1976)	Donald L. Coburn	The Gin Game (1981)	Terry Hughes
Ginger Ale Afternoon (1988)	Gina Wendkos	Ginger Ale Afternoon (1989)	Rafal Zielinski
The Gingerbread Lady (1970)	Neil Simon	Only When I Laugh (1981)	Glenn Jordan
The Girl in the Limousine (1919)	Wilson Collison	The Girl in the Limousine (1924)	Larry Semon; Noel M. Smith
The Girl of the Golden West (1905)	David Belasco	The Girl of the Golden West (1915)	Cecil B. DeMille
The Girl of the Golden West (1905)	David Belasco	The Girl of the Golden West (1923)	Edwin Carewe
The Girl of the Golden West (1905)	David Belasco	The Girl of the Golden West (1930)	John Francis Dillon
The Girl of the Golden West (1905)	David Belasco	The Girl of the Golden West (1938)	Robert Z. Leonard
Girls (1910)	Clyde Fitch	Girls (1919)	Walter Edwards
Glad Tidings	R. F. Delderfield	Glad Tidings (1953)	Wolf Rilla
The Glass Menagerie (1944)	Tennessee Williams	The Glass Menagerie (1950)	Irving Rapper
The Glass Menagerie (1944)	Tennessee Williams	The Glass Menagerie (1966)	Michael Elliott
The Glass Menagerie (1944)	Tennessee Williams	The Glass Menagerie (1973)	Anthony Harvey
The Glass Menagerie (1944)	Tennessee Williams	The Glass Menagerie (1987)	Paul Newman
The Glass of Water (1840)	Eugène Scribe	A Glass of Water (1923)	Ludwig Berger
The Glass of Water (1840)	Eugène Scribe	A Glass of Water (1960)	Helmut Käutner
The Glass of Water (1840)	Eugène Scribe	A Glass of Water (1979)	Yuli Karasik
Glengarry Glen Ross (1984)	David Mamet	Glengarry Glen Ross (1992)	James Foley
Gli Amanti	Brunello Rondi; Renaldo Cabieri	A Place for Lovers (1968)	Vittorio De Sica
Glorious Betsy (1908)	Rida Johnson Young	Glorious Betsy (1928)	Alan Crosland; Gordon Hollingshead
Glorious Betsy (1908)	Rida Johnson Young	Hearts Divided (1936)	Frank Borzage
God of Carnage (2008)	Yasmina Reza	Carnage (2011)	Roman Polanski
Going Crooked (1926)	Winchell Smith; William Collier Sr.	Going Crooked (1926)	George Melford
The Gold Diggers (1919)	Avery Hopwood	The Gold Diggers (1923)	Harry Beaumont
The Gold Diggers (1919)	Avery Hopwood	Gold Diggers of Broadway (1929)	Roy Del Ruth
The Gold Diggers (1919)	Avery Hopwood	Gold Diggers of 1933 (1933)	Mervyn LeRoy
The Gold Diggers (1919)	Avery Hopwood	Painting the Clouds with Sunshine (1951)	David Butler
Golda's Balcony (2003)	William Gibson	Golda's Balcony (2019)	Scott Schwartz
Golden Boy (1937)	Clifford Odets	Golden Boy (1939)	Rouben Mamoulian
Golden Dawn (1927)	Oscar Hammerstein II; Otto Harbach	Golden Dawn (1930)	Ray Enright
The Golden Fleecing	Lorenzo Semple Jr.	The Honeymoon Machine (1961)	Richard Thorpe
The Golden Legend of Schults (1939)	James Bridie	There Was a Crooked Man (1960)	Stuart Burge
The Good Companions (1931)	J. B. Priestley; Edward Knoblock	The Good Companions (1933)	Victor Saville
The Good Earth (1932)	Owen Davis; Donald Davis	The Good Earth (1937)	Sidney Franklin
The Good Fairy (1930)	Ferenc Molnár	The Good Fairy (1935)	William Wyler
The Good Fairy (1930)	Ferenc Molnár	I'll Be Yours (1947)	William A. Seiter
Good Gracious Annabelle (1916)	Clare Kummer	Good Gracious, Annabelle (1919)	George Melford
Good Gracious Annabelle (1916)	Clare Kummer	Annabelle's Affairs (1931)	Alfred L. Werker
The Good Hope (1901)	Herman Heijermans	Op Hoop van Zegen (1918)	Maurits Binger
The Good Hope (1901)	Herman Heijermans	Op Hoop van Zegen (1924)	James Bauer
The Good Hope (1901)	Herman Heijermans	Op Hoop van Zegen (1934)	Alex Benno
Good Luck (1923)	Ian Hay; Seymour Hicks	The Sporting Lover (1926)	Alan Hale Sr.
Goodness, How Sad (1937)	Robert Morley	Return to Yesterday (1940)	Robert Stevenson
Good Night, Paul (1917)	Roland Oliver; Charles Dickson; Harry B. Olsen	Good Night, Paul (1918)	Walter Edwards
The Good Old Soak (1922)	Don Marquis	The Good Old Soak (1937)	J. Walter Ruben
Goodbye Again	George Haight; Allan Scott	Goodbye Again (1933)	Michael Curtiz
Goodbye Again	George Haight; Allan Scott	Honeymoon for Three (1941)	Lloyd Bacon
Goodbye Charlie (1959)	George Axelrod	Goodbye Charlie (1964)	Vincente Minnelli
Goodbye, My Fancy (1948)	Fay Kanin	Goodbye, My Fancy (1951)	Vincent Sherman
The Goodbye People (1968)	Herb Gardner	The Goodbye People (1984)	Herb Gardner
The Goose Hangs High (1924)	Lewis Beach	This Reckless Age (1932)	Frank Tuttle
The Gorilla (1925)	Ralph Spence	The Gorilla (1927)	Alfred Santell
The Gorilla (1925)	Ralph Spence	The Gorilla (1930)	Bryan Foy
The Gorilla (1925)	Ralph Spence	Sh! The Octopus (1937)	William McGann
The Gorilla (1939)	Allan Dwan		
Götz von Berlichingen (1773)	Johann Wolfgang von Goethe	Goetz von Berlichingen (1955)	Alfred Stöger
The Government Inspector (1836)	Nikolai Gogol	A City Upside Down (1933)	Gustaf Gründgens
The Government Inspector (1836)	Nikolai Gogol	The Inspector General (1933)	Martin Frič
The Government Inspector (1836)	Nikolai Gogol	The Inspector General (1949)	Henry Koster
The Government Inspector (1836)	Nikolai Gogol	Afsar (1950)	Chetan Anand
The Government Inspector (1836)	Nikolai Gogol	The Inspector-General (1952)	Vladimir Petrov
The Government Inspector (1836)	Nikolai Gogol	President Panchaksharam (1959)	A. Bhimsingh
The Government Inspector (1836)	Nikolai Gogol	Roaring Years (1962)	Luigi Zampa
The Government Inspector (1836)	Nikolai Gogol	Calzonzin Inspector (1977)	Alfonso Arau
The Government Inspector (1836)	Nikolai Gogol	Incognito from St. Petersburg (1977)	Leonid Gaidai
The Government Inspector (1836)	Nikolai Gogol	De Boezemvriend (1982)	Dimitri Frenkel Frank
The Governor's Lady (1912)	Alice Bradley	The Governor's Lady (1915)	George Melford
Grande École (1990)	Jean-Marie Besset	Grande École (2004)	Robert Salis
The Grandma Plays	Todd Graff	Used People (1992)	Beeban Kidron
Grand National Night (1945)	Campbell Christie; Dorothy Christie	Grand National Night (1953)	Bob McNaught
The Grass is Greener (1956)	Hugh Williams; Margaret Williams	The Grass Is Greener (1960)	Stanley Donen
Great Adventure	Arnold Bennett	His Double Life (1933)	Arthur Hopkins
Great Catherine: Whom Glory Still Adores (1913)	George Bernard Shaw	Great Catherine (1968)	Gordon Flemyng
Great Day (1945)	Lesley Storm	Great Day (1945)	Lance Comfort
The Great Divide (1906)	William Vaughn Moody	The Great Divide (1915)	Edgar Lewis
The Great Divide (1906)	William Vaughn Moody	The Great Divide (1925)	Reginald Barker
The Great Divide (1906)	William Vaughn Moody	The Great Divide (1929)	Reginald Barker
The Great Divide (1906)	William Vaughn Moody	Woman Hungry (1931)	Clarence Badger
The Great Magoo (1932)	Ben Hecht; Gene Fowler	Shoot the Works (1934)	Wesley Ruggles
The Great Magoo (1932)	Ben Hecht; Gene Fowler	Some Like It Hot (1939)	George Archainbaud
The Great Well (1923)	Alfred Sutro	The Great Well (1924)	Henry Kolker
The Great White Hope (1967)	Howard Sackler	The Great White Hope (1970)	Martin Ritt
The Greeks Had a Word for It (1930)	Zoe Akins	The Greeks Had a Word for Them (1932)	Lowell Sherman
The Greeks Had a Word for It (1930)	Zoe Akins	How to Marry a Millionaire (1953)	Jean Negulesco
The Green Goddess	William Archer	The Green Goddess (1923)	Sidney Olcott
The Green Goddess	William Archer	The Green Goddess (1930)	Alfred E. Green
The Green Goddess	William Archer	Adventure in Iraq (1943)	D. Ross Lederman
Green Grow the Lilacs (1930)	Lynn Riggs	Oklahoma (1955)	Fred Zinnemann
The Green Pack (1933)	Edgar Wallace	The Green Pack (1934)	T. Hayes Hunter
The Green Pastures (1930)	Marc Connelly	The Green Pastures (1936)	Marc Connelly; William Keighley
Green Stockings (1910)	A. E. W. Mason	Her Imaginary Lover (1933)	George King
Gretna Green	Grace Livingston Furniss	Gretna Green (1915)	Thomas N. Heffron
Grimaldi (1855)	Dion Boucicault	Grimaldi (1914)	Charles E. Vernon
The Grip of Iron	Arthur Shirley	The Grip of Iron (1920)	Bert Haldane
Grumpy (1921)	Horace Hodges; Thomas Wigney Percyval	Grumpy (1923)	William C. deMille
Guignol le cambrioleur	Louis Verneuil	Burglars(1930)	Hanns Schwarz
Guignol le cambrioleur	Louis Verneuil	Caught in the Act (1931)	Hanns Schwarz; Georges Tréville
The Guilty Man (1916)	Charles Klein; Ruth Helen Davis	The Guilty Man (1918)	Willat
The Guinea Pig (1946)	Warren Chetham-Strode	The Guinea Pig (1948)	Roy Boulting

=== H ===
Play	Playwright	Film	Film director
Habit	Tom Barry	Habit (1921)	Edwin Carewe
Haemoo (2007)	Kim Min-jung	Sea Fog (2014)	Shim Sung-bo
The Hairy Ape (1922)	Eugene O'Neill	The Hairy Ape (1944)	Alfred Santell
Hamilton (1917)	Mary P. Hamlin; George Arliss	Alexander Hamilton (1931)	John G. Adolfi
Hamlet (c.1599–1601)	William Shakespeare	Hamlet (1900)	Clément Maurice
Hamlet (c.1599–1601)	William Shakespeare	Hamlet (1907)	Georges Méliès
Hamlet (c.1599–1601)	William Shakespeare	Hamlet (1908)	Henri Desfontaines
Hamlet (c.1599–1601)	William Shakespeare	Hamlet (1912)	Will Barker; Charles Raymond
Hamlet (c.1599–1601)	William Shakespeare	Hamlet (1913)	Hay Plumb
Hamlet (c.1599–1601)	William Shakespeare	Hamlet (1917)	Eleuterio Rodolfi
Hamlet (c.1599–1601)	William Shakespeare	Hamlet: The Drama of Vengeance (1921)	Svend Gade
Hamlet (c.1599–1601)	William Shakespeare	Khoon Ka Khoon (1935)	Sohrab Modi
Hamlet (c.1599–1601)	William Shakespeare	Hamlet (1948)	Laurence Olivier
Hamlet (c.1599–1601)	William Shakespeare	Hamlet (1954)	Kishore Sahu
Hamlet (c.1599–1601)	William Shakespeare	Hamlet (1959)	Royston Morley
Hamlet (c.1599–1601)	William Shakespeare	Hamlet (1961)	Franz Peter Wirth
Hamlet (c.1599–1601)	William Shakespeare	Hamlet (1964)	Grigori Kozintsev
Hamlet (c.1599–1601)	William Shakespeare	Hamlet at Elsinore (1964)	Philip Saville
Hamlet (c.1599–1601)	William Shakespeare	Hamile (1964)	Terry Bishop
Hamlet (c.1599–1601)	William Shakespeare	Johnny Hamlet (1968)	Enzo G. Castellari
Hamlet (c.1599–1601)	William Shakespeare	Hamlet (1969)	Tony Richardson
Hamlet (c.1599–1601)	William Shakespeare	Hamlet Goes Business (1987)	Aki Kaurismäki
Hamlet (c.1599–1601)	William Shakespeare	Hamlet (1990)	Franco Zeffirelli
Hamlet (c.1599–1601)	William Shakespeare	Hamlet (1996)	Kenneth Branagh
Hamlet (c.1599–1601)	William Shakespeare	Let the Devil Wear Black (1999)	Stacy Title
Hamlet (c.1599–1601)	William Shakespeare	Hamlet (2000)	Michael Almereyda
Hamlet (c.1599–1601)	William Shakespeare	Hamlet (2009)	Gregory Doran
Hamlet (c.1599–1601)	William Shakespeare	Hamlet (2011)	Bruce Ramsay
Hamlet (c.1599–1601)	William Shakespeare	Karmayogi (2012)	V. K. Prakash
Hamlet (c.1599–1601)	William Shakespeare	Hemanta (2016)	Anjan Dutt
Hamp (1964)	John Wilson	King and Country (1964)	Joseph Losey
Hand in Glove (1944)	Gerald Savory	Urge to Kill (1960)	Vernon Sewell
Hand und Herz	Ludwig Anzengruber	In the Line of Duty (1917)	Jacob Fleck; Luise Fleck
Handful of Tansy	Kay Bannerman; Harold Brooke	No My Darling Daughter (1961)	Ralph Thomas
Hangman's Whip (1933)	Norman Reilly Raine; Frank Butler	White Woman (1933)	Stuart Walker
Hanuma	Avksenty Tsagareli	Keto and Kote (1948)	Vakhtang Tabliashvili; Shalva Gedevanishvili
The Happiest Days of Your Life (1947)	John Dighton	The Happiest Days of Your Life (1950)	Frank Launder
Happily Ever After	Chester Erskine	The Sailor Takes a Wife (1945)	Richard Whorf
Happy Anniversary (1954)	Jerome Chodorov	Happy Anniversary (1959)	David Miller
Happy Birthday, Wanda June (1970)	Kurt Vonnegut	Happy Birthday, Wanda June (1971)	Mark Robson
The Happy Ending (1922)	Ian Hay	The Happy Ending (1925)	George A. Cooper
The Happy Family (1951)	Michael Clayton Hutton	The Happy Family (1952)	Muriel Box
The Happy Husband (1927)	Harrison Owen	Uneasy Virtue (1931)	Norman Walker
The Happy Time (1951)	Samuel A. Taylor	The Happy Time (1952)	Richard Fleischer
The Harbour Lights (1885)	George Robert Sims	The Harbour Lights (1914)	Percy Nash
Harvey (1944)	Mary Chase	Harvey (1950)	Henry Koster
The Hasty Heart (1945)	John Patrick	The Hasty Heart (1949)	Vincent Sherman
A Hat, a Coat, a Glove (1934)	Wilhelm Speyer	A Night of Adventure (1944)	Gordon Douglas
A Hatful of Rain (1955)	Michael V. Gazzo	A Hatful of Rain (1957)	Fred Zinnemann
The Haunted Light	Evadne Price; Joan Roy Byford	The Phantom Light (1935)	Michael Powell
Haute Surveillance (1947)	Jean Genet	Deathwatch (1965)	Vic Morrow
Hawk Island	Howard Irving Young	Midnight Mystery (1930)	George B. Seitz
Hawthorne of the U.S.A. (1905)	J. B. Fagan	Hawthorne of the U.S.A. (1919)	James Cruze
Hazel Flagg (1953)	Ben Hecht	Living It Up (1954)	Norman Taurog
The Headmaster (1913)	Edward Knoblock; Wilfred Coleby	The Headmaster (1921)	Kenelm Foss
Heartbreak House (1919)	George Bernard Shaw	Mournful Unconcern (1987)	Alexander Sokurov
Heart of a City (1942)	Lesley Storm	Tonight and Every Night (1945)	Victor Saville
The Heart of Maryland (1895)	David Belasco	The Heart of Maryland (1915)	Herbert Brenon
The Heart of Maryland (1895)	David Belasco	The Heart of Maryland (1921)	Tom Terriss
The Heart of Maryland (1895)	David Belasco	The Heart of Maryland (1927)	Lloyd Bacon
Heat Lightning (1933)	George Abbott; Leon Abrams	Heat Lightning (1934)	Mervyn LeRoy
Heath Cobblers (1864)	Aleksis Kivi	The Village Shoemakers (1923)	Erkki Karu
Heath Cobblers (1864)	Aleksis Kivi	Nummisuutarit (1938)	Wilho Ilmari
Heath Cobblers (1864)	Aleksis Kivi	Nummisuutarit (1957)	Valentin Vaala
Heat Wave (1929)	Roland Pertwee	The Road to Singapore (1931)	Alfred E. Green
Heaven Can Wait (1938)	Harry Segall	Here Comes Mr. Jordan (1941)	Alexander Hall
Heaven Can Wait (1978)	Warren Beatty		
Hedda Gabler (1891)	Henrik Ibsen	Hedda Gabler (1920)	Gero Zambuto
Hedda Gabler (1891)	Henrik Ibsen	Hedda Gabler (1925)	Franz Eckstein
Hedda Gabler (1891)	Henrik Ibsen	Hedda Gabler (1961)	William Sterling
Hedda Gabler (1891)	Henrik Ibsen	Hedda (1975)	Trevor Nunn
Hedda Gabler (1891)	Henrik Ibsen	Hedda Gabler (2016)	Matthew John
The Heidi Chronicles (1988)	Wendy Wasserstein	The Heidi Chronicles (1995)	Paul Bogart
Heimat (1893)	Hermann Sudermann	Heimat (1938)	Carl Froelich
The Heiress (1947)	Ruth Goetz; Augustus Goetz	The Heiress (1949)	William Wyler
Held by the Enemy (1886)	William Gillette	Held by the Enemy (1920)	Donald Crisp; Wilton Welch
Hello Again (1994)	Michael John LaChiusa	Hello Again (2017)	Tom Gustafson
Hello, Dolly!	Michael Stewart; Jerry Herman	Hello, Dolly! (1969)	Gene Kelly
Henry IV (1921)	Luigi Pirandello	The Flight in the Night (1926)	Amleto Palermi
Henry IV (1921)	Luigi Pirandello	Henry IV (1984)	Marco Bellocchio
Henry IV, Part 1 (1597) and Henry IV, Part 2 (1599)	William Shakespeare	An Age of Kings (1960)	Michael Hayes
Henry IV, Part 1 (1597) and Henry IV, Part 2 (1599)	William Shakespeare	Chimes at Midnight (1966)	Orson Welles
Henry IV, Part 1 (1597) and Henry IV, Part 2 (1599)	William Shakespeare	My Own Private Idaho (1991)	Gus Van Sant
Henry IV, Part 1 (1597) and Henry IV, Part 2 (1599)	William Shakespeare	The King (2019)	David Michôd
Henry V (1599)	William Shakespeare	Henry V (1944)	Laurence Olivier
Henry V (1599)	William Shakespeare	An Age of Kings (1960)	Michael Hayes
Henry V (1599)	William Shakespeare	Chimes at Midnight (1966)	Orson Welles
Henry V (1599)	William Shakespeare	Henry V (1989)	Kenneth Branagh
Henry V (1599)	William Shakespeare	My Own Private Idaho (1991)	Gus Van Sant
Henry V (1599)	William Shakespeare	The King (2019)	David Michôd
Henry VI, Part 1 Henry VI, Part 2 Henry VI, Part 3	William Shakespeare	An Age of Kings (1960)	Michael Hayes
Henry VI, Part 1 Henry VI, Part 2 Henry VI, Part 3	William Shakespeare	The Wars of the Roses (1963)	John Barton; Peter Hall
Henry VIII (1613)	William Shakespeare	Henry VIII (1911)	Will Barker
Here Comes the Bride (1917)	Max Marcin; Roy Atwell	Here Comes the Bride (1919)	John S. Robertson
Her First Affaire (1927)	Merrill Rogers	Her First Affaire (1932)	Allan Dwan
Her Great Match (1905)	Clyde Fitch	Her Great Match (1915)	René Plaissetty
Her Luck in London (1905)	Charles Darrell	Her Luck in London (1914)	Maurice Elvey
Her Master's Voice (1933)	Clare Kummer	Her Master's Voice (1936)	Joseph Santley
The Hero (1921)	Gilbert Emery	The Hero (1923)	Louis J. Gasnier
The Hero (1921)	Gilbert Emery	Swell Guy (1946)	Frank Tuttle
Her Own Way	Clyde Fitch (1903)	Her Own Way (1915)	Herbert Blaché
Her Past (1929)	Frederick J. Jackson	My Sin (1934)	George Abbott
Herren og hans tjenere (1955)	Axel Kielland	The Master and His Servants (1959)	Arne Skouen
Her Temporary Husband	Edward A. Paulton	Her Temporary Husband (1923)	John McDermott
He Who Gets Slapped	Leonid Andreyev	He Who Gets Slapped (1924)	Victor Seastrom
High Life	Lee MacDougall	High Life (2009)	Gary Yates
The High Road (1927)	Frederick Lonsdale	The Lady of Scandal (1930)	Sidney Franklin
High Tor (1936)		High Tor (1956)	James Neilson
High Treason	Noel Pemberton Billing	High Treason (1929)	Maurice Elvey
High Wall	Bradbury Foote; Alan. R. Clark	High Wall (1947)	Curtis Bernhardt
Hilda Crane (1950)	Samson Raphaelson	Hilda Crane (1956)	Philip Dunne
Himmeluret (1905)	Gabriel Scott	Himmeluret (1925)	Amund Rydland; Leif Sinding
Hindle Wakes (1912)	Stanley Houghton	Hindle Wakes (1918)	Maurice Elvey
Hindle Wakes (1912)	Stanley Houghton	Hindle Wakes (1927)	Maurice Elvey
Hindle Wakes (1912)	Stanley Houghton	Hindle Wakes (1931)	Victor Saville
Hindle Wakes (1912)	Stanley Houghton	Hindle Wakes (1952)	Arthur Crabtree
Hippolytus (428 BCE)	Euripides	Phaedra (1962)	Jules Dassin
His House in Order (1906)	Arthur Wing Pinero	Bonds of Love (1919)	Reginald Barker
His House in Order (1906)	Arthur Wing Pinero	His House in Order (1920)	Hugh Ford
His House in Order (1906)	Arthur Wing Pinero	His House in Order (1928)	Randle Ayrton
His Majesty Bunker Bean (1915)	Lee Wilson Dodd	His Majesty, Bunker Bean (1918)	William Desmond Taylor
His Majesty Bunker Bean (1915)	Lee Wilson Dodd	His Majesty, Bunker Bean (1925)	Harry Beaumont
His Majesty Bunker Bean (1915)	Lee Wilson Dodd	Bunker Bean (1936)	William Hamilton; Edward Killy
His Royal Highness (1927)	George Wallace	His Royal Highness (1932)	F. W. Thring
The History Boys (2004)	Alan Bennett	The History Boys (2006)	Nicholas Hytner
Hobson's Choice (1915)	Harold Brighouse	Hobson's Choice (1920)	Percy Nash
Hobson's Choice (1915)	Harold Brighouse	Hobson's Choice (1931)	Thomas Bentley
Hobson's Choice (1915)	Harold Brighouse	Hobson's Choice (1954)	David Lean
Hokuspokus (1926)	Curt Goetz	Hocuspocus (1930)	Gustav Ucicky
Hokuspokus (1926)	Curt Goetz	The Temporary Widow (1930)	Gustav Ucicky
Hokuspokus (1926)	Curt Goetz	Hocuspocus (1953)	Kurt Hoffmann
Hokuspokus (1926)	Curt Goetz	Hocuspocus (1966)	Kurt Hoffmann
A Hole in the Head (1957)	Arnold Schulman	A Hole in the Head (1959)	Frank Capra
The Hole in the Wall (1920)	Frederick J. Jackson	The Hole in the Wall (1921)	Maxwell Karger
The Hole in the Wall (1920)	Frederick J. Jackson	The Hole in the Wall (1929)	Robert Florey
Holiday (1928)	Philip Barry	Holiday (1930)	Edward H. Griffith
Holiday (1928)	Philip Barry	Holiday (1938)	George Cukor
Holiday for Lovers (1957)	Ronald Alexander	Holiday for Lovers (1959)	Henry Levin
The Holly and the Ivy (1950)	Wynyard Browne	The Holly and the Ivy (1952)	George More O'Ferrall
A Holy Terror	George Abbott; Jack Jungmeyer	Hills of Peril (1927)	Lambert Hillyer
Home and Beauty (1919)	W. Somerset Maugham	Three for the Show (1955)	H. C. Potter
Home and Beauty (1919)	W. Somerset Maugham	Too Many Husbands (1940)	Wesley Ruggles
The Homecoming (1965)	Harold Pinter	The Homecoming (1973)	Peter Hall
Home at Seven	R. C. Sherriff	Home at Seven (1952)	Ralph Richardson
Home Fires Burning	Chris Ceraso	The Turning (1992)	L. A. Puopolo
Homenaje a la hora de la siesta	Beatriz Guido	Homage at Siesta Time (1962)	Leopoldo Torre Nilsson
Hometowners (1926)	George M. Cohan	The Home Towners (1928)	Bryan Foy
Hometowners (1926)	George M. Cohan	Times Square Playboy (1936)	William C. McGann
The Honest Finder	Aladár László	Trouble in Paradise (1932)	Ernst Lubitsch
The Honorable Mr. Wong	David Belasco; Achmed Abdullah	The Hatchet Man (1932)	William A. Wellman
Hoodman Blind (1885)	Wilson Barrett; Henry Arthur Jones	A Man of Sorrow (1916)	Oscar Apfel
Hoodman Blind (1885)	Wilson Barrett; Henry Arthur Jones	Hoodman Blind (1923)	John Ford
Hospitality Suite	Roger Rueff	The Big Kahuna (1999)	John Swanbeck
Hotel Imperial	Lajos Bíró	Hotel Imperial (1927)	Mauritz Stiller
Hotel Imperial	Lajos Bíró	Hotel Imperial (1939)	Robert Florey
Hotel Sorrento	Hannie Rayson	Hotel Sorrento (1995)	Richard Franklin
Hot Money (1931)	Aben Kandel	High Pressure (1932)	Mervyn LeRoy
Hot Nocturne	Edwin Gilbert; Elia Kazan	Blues in the Night (1941)	Anatole Litvak
Hot Summer Night (1958)	Ted Willis	Flame in the Streets (1961)	Roy Ward Baker
The Hottentot (1920)	William Collier, Sr. Victor Mapes	The Hottentot (1922)	James W. Horne; Del Andrews
The Hottentot (1920)	William Collier, Sr. Victor Mapes	The Hottentot (1929)	Roy Del Ruth
The Hottentot (1920)	William Collier, Sr. Victor Mapes	Going Places (1938)	Ray Enright
The Hour Before My Brother Dies	Daniel Keene	The Hour Before My Brother Dies (1986)	James Clayden
House (1992)	Daniel MacIvor	House (1995)	Laurie Lynd
The House in Montevideo (1945)	Curt Goetz	The House in Montevideo (1951)	Valérie von Martens; Curt Goetz
The House in Montevideo (1945)	Curt Goetz	The House in Montevideo (1963)	Helmut Käutner
A House in the Country (1937)	Melvin Levy	Hideaway (1937)	Richard Rosson
Housemaster (1936)	[[Ian Hay {{{last}}}]]	Housemaster (1938)	Herbert Brenon
The House of Bernarda Alba (1936)	Federico García Lorca	The House of Bernarda Alba (1987)	Mario Camus
The House of Connelly (1931)	Paul Green	Carolina (1934)	Henry King
The House of Glass (1916)	George M. Cohan; Max Marcin	The Unusual Past of Thea Carter (1929)	Ernst Laemmle; Joseph Levigard
The House of the Arrow (1926)	A. E. W. Mason	The House of the Arrow (1930)	Leslie S. Hiscott
The House of Yes (1990)	Wendy MacLeod	The House of Yes (1997)	Mark Waters
How Say You? (1960)	Kay Bannerman; Harold Brooke	A Pair of Briefs (1962)	Ralph Thomas
A Huey P. Newton Story (1997)	Roger Guenveur Smith	A Huey P. Newton Story (2001)	Spike Lee
Huit femmes	Robert Thomas	8 Women (2002, musical)	François Ozon
Human Hearts	Hal Reid	Human Hearts (1922)	King Baggot
The Human Voice (1930)	Jean Cocteau	L'Amore (1948)	Roberto Rossellini
The Humming Bird (1923)	Maude Fulton	The Humming Bird (1924)	Sidney Olcott
Humpty-Dumpty	Horace Annesley Vachell	If I Were Rich (1936)	Randall Faye
The Hurdy-Gurdy Man	Leroy Clemens; John B. Hymer	Love, Live and Laugh (1929)	William K. Howard
Hurlyburly (1984)	David Rabe	Hurlyburly (1998)	Anthony Drazan
The Husbands of Leontine	René Le Hénaff	The Husbands of Leontine (1947)	Alfred Capus
Hyde Park Corner (1934)	Walter Hackett	Hyde Park Corner (1935)	Sinclair Hill
The Hypocrites (1906)	Henry Arthur Jones	The Hypocrites (1916)	George Loane Tucker
The Hypocrites (1906)	Henry Arthur Jones	The Hypocrites (1923)	Charles Giblyn

=== I ===
Play	Playwright	Film	Film director
I Am a Camera (1951)	John Van Druten	I Am a Camera (1955)	Henry Cornelius
I Am a Camera (1951)	John Van Druten	Cabaret (1972)	Bob Fosse
The Iceman Cometh (1946)	Eugene O'Neill	The Iceman Cometh (1960)	Sidney Lumet
The Iceman Cometh (1946)	Eugene O'Neill	The Iceman Cometh (1973)	John Frankenheimer
An Ideal Husband (1895)	Oscar Wilde	An Ideal Husband (1935)	Herbert Selpin
An Ideal Husband (1895)	Oscar Wilde	An Ideal Husband (1947)	Alexander Korda
An Ideal Husband (1895)	Oscar Wilde	An Ideal Husband (1947)	Luis Bayón Herrera
An Ideal Husband (1895)	Oscar Wilde	An Ideal Husband (1980)	Viktor Georgiyev
An Ideal Husband (1895)	Oscar Wilde	An Ideal Husband (1999)	Oliver Parker
An Ideal Husband (1895)	Oscar Wilde	An Ideal Husband (2000)	William P. Cartlidge
Idioglossia	Mark Handley	Nell (1994)	Michael Apted
Idiot's Delight (1936)	Robert E. Sherwood	Idiot's Delight (1939)	Clarence Brown
The Idol	Martin Brown	The Mad Genius (1931)	Michael Curtiz
The Idol of Paris	Charles Darrell	The Idol of Paris (1914)	Maurice Elvey
If I Were King (1901)	Justin Huntly McCarthy	If I Were King (1938)	Frank Lloyd
If I Were for Real (1979)	Sha Yexin	If I Were for Real (1981)	Wang Toon
I Killed the Count (1937)	Alec Coppel	I Killed the Count (1939)	Frederic Zelnik
Ikiteiru mono wa inai no ka	Shiro Maeda	Isn't Anyone Alive? (2012)	Gakuryū Ishii
Il conte di Brechard (1924)	Giovacchino Forzano	The Count of Brechard (1938)	Mario Bonnard
Il est cocu, le chef de gare (1925)	Nicolas Nancey; André Mouëzy-Éon	Station Master (1941)	Jan Sviták
Il était une fois... (1932)	Francis de Croisset	A Woman's Face (1938)	Gustaf Molander
Il était une fois... (1932)	Francis de Croisset	A Woman's Face (1941)	George Cukor
Il fornaretto di Venezia	Francesco Dall'Ongaro	The Fornaretto of Venice (1939)	Duilio Coletti
I Lived with You (1932)	Ivor Novello	I Lived with You (1933)	Maurice Elvey
Illatszertár (1937)	Miklós László	The Shop Around the Corner (1940)	Ernst Lubitsch
Illatszertár (1937)	Miklós László	In the Good Old Summertime (1949)	Robert Z. Leonard
Illatszertár (1937)	Miklós László	You've Got Mail (1998)	Nora Ephron
I Love You (1919)	William LeBaron	Lovin' the Ladies (1930)	Melville W. Brown
I Love You, I Love You Not (1982)	Wendy Kesselman	I Love You, I Love You Not (1996)	Billy Hopkins
I Loved You Wednesday (1932)	Molly Ricardel; William DuBois	I Loved You Wednesday (1933)	William Cameron Menzies; Henry King
Il sindaco del Rione Sanità (1960)	Eduardo De Filippo	The Mayor (1997)	Ugo Fabrizio Giordani
The Imaginary Invalid (1673)	Molière	The Imaginary Invalid (1952)	Hans H. König
The Imaginary Invalid (1673)	Molière	Hypochondriac (1979)	Tonino Cervi
I'm Not Rappaport (1984)	Herb Gardner	I'm Not Rappaport (1996)	Herb Gardner
Imperfect Love	Brandon Cole	Illuminata (1998)	John Turturro
The Importance of Being Earnest (1895)	Oscar Wilde	The Importance of Being Earnest (1932)	Franz Wenzler
The Importance of Being Earnest (1895)	Oscar Wilde	Al Compás de tu Mentira (1950)	Héctor Canziani
The Importance of Being Earnest (1895)	Oscar Wilde	The Importance of Being Earnest (1952)	Anthony Asquith
The Importance of Being Earnest (1895)	Oscar Wilde	The Importance of Being Earnest (1957)	Paul O'Loughlin
The Importance of Being Earnest (1895)	Oscar Wilde	The Importance of Being Earnest (2002)	Oliver Parker
The Importance of Being Earnest (1895)	Oscar Wilde	Ashta Chamma (2008)	Mohana Krishna Indraganti
The Importance of Being Earnest (1895)	Oscar Wilde	The Importance of Being Earnest (2011)	Brian Bedford; David Stern
The Impossible Years (1965)	Robert Fisher; Arthur Marx	The Impossible Years (1968)	
The Improper Duchess (1931)	J. B. Fagan	The Improper Duchess (1936)	Harry Hughes
I'm Sorry the Bridge is Out, You'll Have to Spend the Night (1967)	Bobby Pickett; Sheldon Allman	Monster Mash (1995)	Joel Cohen; Alec Sokolow
In Celebration (1969)	David Storey	In Celebration (1975)	Lindsay Anderson
Inadmissible Evidence (1964)	John Osborne	Inadmissible Evidence (1968)	Anthony Page
Incendies (2003)	Wajdi Mouawad	Incendies (2010)	Denis Villeneuve
Incident at Vichy (1964)	Arthur Miller	Incident at Vichy (1973)	Stacy Keach
Indians (1968)	Arthur Kopit	Buffalo Bill and the Indians, or Sitting Bull's History Lesson (1976)	Robert Altman
I Never Sang for My Father (1968)	Robert Anderson	I Never Sang for My Father (1970)	Gilbert Cates
The Inferior Sex	Frank Slayton	The Inferior Sex (1920)	Joseph Henabery
Information, Please (1918)	Jane Cowl; Jane Murfin	A Temperamental Wife (1919)	David Kirkland
Ingeborg (1922)	Curt Goetz	Ingeborg (1960)	Wolfgang Liebeneiner
Inherit the Wind (1955)	Jerome Lawrence; Robert E. Lee	Inherit the Wind (1960)	Stanley Kramer
Inherit the Wind (1955)	Jerome Lawrence; Robert E. Lee	Inherit the Wind (1988)	David Greene
Inherit the Wind (1955)	Jerome Lawrence; Robert E. Lee	Inherit the Wind (1999)	Daniel Petrie
In Love with Love	Vincent Lawrence	In Love with Love (1924)	Rowland V. Lee
In Mizzoura, 1893	Augustus Thomas	In Mizzoura (1919)	Hugh Ford
The Innocents (1950)	William Archibald	The Innocents (1961)	Jack Clayton
In Old Kentucky (1893)	Charles Dazey	In Old Kentucky (1919)	Marshall Neilan
In Old Kentucky (1893)	Charles Dazey	In Old Kentucky (1927)	John M. Stahl
In Old Kentucky (1893)	Charles Dazey	In Old Kentucky (1935)	George Marshall
I Ought to Be in Pictures (1979)	Neil Simon	Neil Simon's I Ought to Be in Pictures (1982)	Herbert Ross
In Pawn	Frank Stayton	A Woman in Pawn (1927)	Edwin Greenwood
Inquest (1931)	Michael Barringer	Inquest (1931)	G. B. Samuelson
Inquest (1931)	Michael Barringer	Inquest (1939)	Roy Boulting
Inside the Lines (1915)	Earl Derr Biggers	Inside the Lines (1930)	Roy Pomeroy
Insignificance (1982)	Terry Johnson	Insignificance (1985)	Nicolas Roeg
An Inspector Calls (1945)	J. B. Priestley	An Inspector Calls (1954)	Guy Hamilton
An Inspector Calls (1945)	J. B. Priestley	An Inspector Calls (2015, TV)	Aisling Walsh
An Inspector Calls (1945)	J. B. Priestley	An Inspector Calls (2015)	Raymond Wong Pak-ming; Herman Yau
Interference (1927)	Roland Pertwee; Harold Dearden	Interference (1928)	Lothar Mendes; Roy Pomeroy
Interference (1927)	Roland Pertwee; Harold Dearden	Without Regret (1935)	Harold Young
Interieur	Hugo Claus	The Sacrament (1989)	Hugo Claus
Interim (1940)	Thomas Edward O'Connell	Face Behind the Mask (1941)	Robert Florey
In the Bishop’s Carriage (1907)	Channing Pollock	She Couldn't Help It (1920)	Maurice Campbell
In the Company of Men (1993)	Neil LaBute	In the Company of Men (1997)	Neil LaBute
In the Night Watch (1921)	Michael Morton	Night Watch (1928)	Alexander Korda
In the Zone (1917)	Eugene O'Neill	The Long Voyage Home (1940)	John Ford
Intimate Exchanges (1982)	Alan Ayckbourn	Smoking/No Smoking (1993)	Alain Resnais
Intrigue and Love (1784)	Friedrich Schiller	Luise Millerin (1922)	Carl Froelich
Intrigue and Love (1784)	Friedrich Schiller	Intrigue and Love (1959)	Martin Hellberg
I padri etruschi	Tullio Pinelli	The Adulteress (1946)	Duilio Coletti
Iphigenia in Aulis (405 BC)	Euripides	Iphigenia (1977)	Michael Cacoyannis
I Remember Mama (1944)	John Van Druten	I Remember Mama (1948)	George Stevens
Irene (1919)	James Montgomery	Irene (1926)	Alfred E. Green
Iris (1901)	Arthur Wing Pinero	Iris (1916)	Cecil M. Hepworth
Iris (1901)	Arthur Wing Pinero	A Slave of Vanity (1920)	Henry Otto
The Iron Woman (1932)	Frederick J. Jackson	That's My Uncle (1935)	George Pearson
Is Your Honeymoon Really Necessary? (1944)	Vivian Tidmarsh	Is Your Honeymoon Really Necessary? (1953)	Maurice Elvey
Is Zat So? (1925)	James Gleason	Is Zat So? (1927)	Alfred E. Green
Is Zat So? (1925)	James Gleason	Two-Fisted (1935)	James Cruze
The Italian Straw Hat (1851)	Eugène Labiche; Marc-Michel	The Italian Straw Hat (1928)	René Clair
The Italian Straw Hat (1851)	Eugène Labiche; Marc-Michel	The Leghorn Hat (1939)	Wolfgang Liebeneiner
The Italian Straw Hat (1851)	Eugène Labiche; Marc-Michel	The Straw Hat (1974)	Leonid Kvinikhidze
It Is the Law (1922)	Elmer Rice; Hayden Talbot	It Is the Law (1924)	J. Gordon Edwards
It Pays to Advertise (1914)	Roi Cooper Megrue; Walter Hackett	It Pays to Advertise (1919)	Donald Crisp
It Pays to Advertise (1914)	Roi Cooper Megrue; Walter Hackett	It Pays to Advertise (1931)	Frank Tuttle
It's a 2'6" Above the Ground World	Kevin Laffan	The Love Ban (1973)	Ralph Thomas
It's a Boy (1931)	Austin Melford	It's a Boy (1933)	Tim Whelan
It's Never Too Late (1952)	Felicity Douglas	It's Never Too Late (1956)	W. J. Lincoln
It's Only the End of the World (1990)	Jean-Luc Lagarce	It's Only the End of the World (2016)	Xavier Dolan
Ivan Vasilievich (1936)	Mikhail Bulgakov	Ivan Vasilievich: Back to the Future (1988)	Leonid Gaidai

== See also ==
- List of plays adapted into feature films: J to Q
- List of plays adapted into feature films: R to Z
- Film adaptation
- Lists of film source material
- List of musicals adapted into feature films
- Category:Films based on works by William Shakespeare
- List of William Shakespeare screen adaptations
