= Nothing but the Truth =

Nothing but the Truth may refer to:

A part of an oath before a sworn testimony is given.

== Books ==
- Nothing But the Truth (Isham novel), a 1914 novel by Frederic S. Isham
- Nothing But the Truth (Rhode novel), a 1947 novel by John Rhode
- Nothing but the Truth: A Documentary Novel, a 1991 book written by Avi
- Nothing but the Truth, a 1971 autobiography by Joseph Berger-Barzilai
- Nothing but the Truth, a 1999 legal crime thriller by John Lescroart

== Film and TV ==
- Nothing But the Truth (1920 film), an American silent film directed by David Kirkland
- Nothing but the Truth (1929 film), an American comedy film directed by Victor Schertzinger
- Nothing But the Truth (1939 film), a Swedish comedy film directed by Weyler Hildebrand
- Nothing but the Truth (1941 film), an American comedy film directed by Elliott Nugent
- Nothing but the Truth (2008 American film), a drama
- Nothing but the Truth (2008 South African film)
- Nothing but the Truth (British game show), hosted by Jerry Springer
- Nada más que la verdad, a Spanish-language game show, also called Nothing but the Truth
- "Nothing but the Truth" (Kavanagh QC), a 1995 television episode
- "Nothing but the Truth" (Never the Twain), a 1981 episode
- "Nothing but the Truth" (seaQuest DSV), the fifteenth episode of the first season

== Music ==
- Nothing but the Truth (Mac McAnally album), 1983
- Nothing but the Truth (Rubén Blades album), 1988
- Nothing but the Truth (Son Seals album), 1994
- Nothing but the Truth (Southern Sons album), 1991
- "Nothing but the Truth", on the album Exotic Birds and Fruit by Procol Harum
