= Three Live Ghosts =

Three Live Ghosts may refer to:

- Three Live Ghosts (novel), a 1918 novel by Frederic S. Isham
- Three Live Ghosts (play), a 1920 play by Frederic S. Isham, adapted from his novel
- Three Live Ghosts (1922 film), a British comedy, based on the play
- Three Live Ghosts (1929 film), an American comedy, based on the play
- Three Live Ghosts (1936 film), an American romantic comedy, based on the play
