= Cheating Cheaters =

Cheating Cheaters may refer to:

- Cheating Cheaters (play), a 1916 Broadway play by Max Marcin, and three film adaptations of the play:
  - Cheating Cheaters (1919 film)
  - Cheating Cheaters (1927 film)
  - Cheating Cheaters (1934 film)
