= The Pure Truth =

1931 film

- Spanish: La pura verdad
- Directed by: Manuel Romero
- Written by: John McGowan; James Montgomery (play); Pedro Muñoz Seca
- Based on: Nothing But the Truth by Frederic S. Isham
- Starring: José Isbert; Enriqueta Serrano; Manuel Russell
- Cinematography: René Dantan
- Music by: Paul Barnaby; Lionel Cazaux; Johnny Green
- Production company: Paramount Pictures
- Distributed by: Paramount Pictures
- Release date: December 4, 1931
- Running time: 74 minutes
- Country: United States
- Language: Spanish

La pura verdad (lit. 'The Pure Truth') is a 1931 American Spanish-language comedy film directed by Manuel Romero and produced by Paramount Pictures at the Joinville Studios in France. A Spanish-language version of Nothing But the Truth (1929), it is based on James Montgomery's play Nothing But the Truth, with a screenplay by John McGowan adapted into Spanish by Pedro Muñoz Seca. Florián Rey served as dialogue director and Ted Pahle as cinematographer. The film premiered in Buenos Aires on 4 December 1931 at the Cine Gloria. It stars José Isbert, Enriqueta Serrano and Manuel Russell.

The film's sets were designed by Henri Ménessier and René Renoux.

== Cast ==
- José Isbert as Sr. Lamberti
- Enriqueta Serrano as Emilia Lamberti
- Manuel Russell as Roberto
- María Brú as Sra. Lamberti
- Goyita Herrero as Sabel
- Amalia de Isaura as President
- José Soria as Ricardo
- Manuel Vico as Apollodorus
- Pedro Valdivieso as Reverent Doran
- Pilar Casteig as Mabel
- Pedro Gonzalez as Silvan
- Antoñita Colomé as Esther
- Maria Gonzalez as secretary
- Leda Ginelly as Marta
- Freddy Castel as Cuban
- Joaquín Carrasco as doctor
- Pelayo Corgo as banker
- Ramón Portavella as gardener
- Francisco Alarcon as chauffeur
- Gaby Morelle as nurse
- José Sierra de Luna as Cabaret director

== See also ==
- List of works by Manuel Romero
