= Nutcracker (disambiguation) =

A nutcracker is a tool for cracking nuts.

Nutcracker or The Nutcracker may also refer to:

== Arts, entertainment, and media ==
- "The Nutcracker and the Mouse King", an 1816 story by E.T.A. Hoffmann
  - List of productions of The Nutcracker, other versions and revisions of Hoffman's story
- The Nutcracker (Histoire d'un casse-noisette, 1844): a revision of Hoffmann's story by Alexandre Dumas
- The Nutcracker, an 1892 ballet by Tchaikovsky
- The Nutcracker (Willam Christensen), a 1944 version of the ballet
- The Nutcracker (Balanchine), a 1954 stage production of the ballet
- The Nutcracker, International Television Contest for Young Musicians, a Russian annual music competition
- "The Nutcracker" (Playhouse 90), a 1958 television episode, featuring Tchaikovsky's ballet
- The Nut Cracker, a 1920 novel by Frederic S. Isham
- "The Nutcracker" (Dirty Sexy Money), a 2007 television episode
- "Nutcracker" (Industry), a 2020 television episode

=== Films ===
- The Nutcracker (1926 film), a 1926 American silent film directed by Lloyd Ingraham
- The Nutcracker (1967 film), a 1967 Polish film directed by Halina Bielińska
- The Nutcracker (1973 film), a 1973 Soviet animation directed by Boris Stepantsev
- Nutcracker (film), a 1982 British drama film
- Pacific Northwest Ballet's Nutcraker, a 1986 film directed by Carroll Ballard
- The Nutcracker Prince, a 1990 Canadian-American animated film.
- The Nutcracker (1993 film), a 1993 American Christmas musical directed by Emile Ardolino
- The Nutcracker in 3D (released on DVD as The Nutcracker: The Untold Story), a 2009 British-Hungarian 3D film
- The Nutcracker and the Four Realms, a 2018 American film
- Nutcrackers (film), a 2024 American film

== Computing ==
- Nutcracker (Excelan), a networking analyzer by Excelan
- NuTCRACKER, a software suite that included the MKS Toolkit

== Other uses ==
- Nutcracker (bird), a genus of birds
- Nutcracker, a tow gripper needed on some ski tows
- Nutcracker doll, a German decorative figurine
- Nutcracker (drink), a type of alcoholic drink illicitly sold in New York City
- Nutcracker syndrome, a medical condition involving a crushed vein
