= Nothing But the Truth (1920 film) =

1920 film

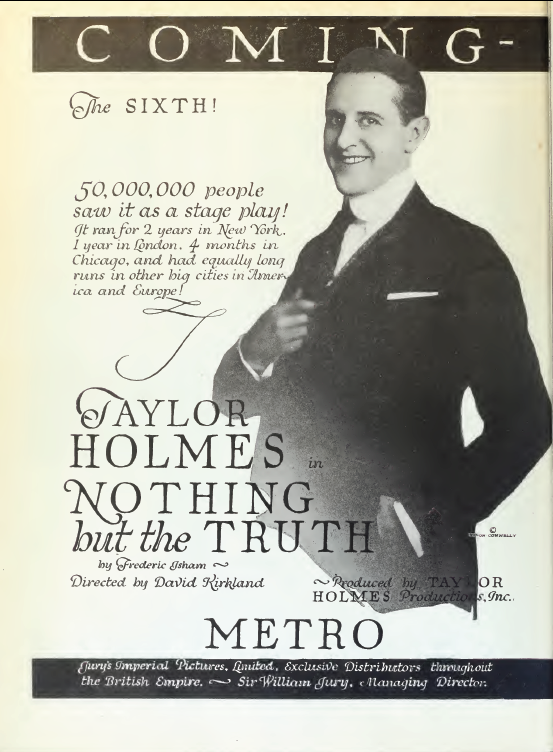
- Directed by: David Kirkland
- Written by: David Kirkland; Katherine S. Reed
- Based on: Nothing But the Truth; 1914 novel by Frederic S. Isham; 1916 play by James Montgomery
- Starring: Taylor Holmes; Elsie Mackay; Ned Sparks
- Cinematography: Jacob A. Badaracco
- Production company: Taylor Holmes Productions
- Distributed by: Metro Pictures
- Release date: January 6, 1920
- Running time: 60 minutes
- Country: United States
- Languages: Silent; English intertitles

Nothing But the Truth is a 1920 American silent comedy film directed by David Kirkland and starring Taylor Holmes, Elsie Mackay and Ned Sparks. It is based on the 1916 Broadway play Nothing But the Truth (1916) by James Montgomery which was in turn based on the 1914 novel Nothing But the Truth by Frederic S. Isham.

== Cast ==
- Taylor Holmes as Robert Bennett
- Elsie Mackay as Gwendolyn Gerald
- Ned Sparks as The Monocle Man
- Marcelle Carroll as Dolly
- Ben Hendricks Sr. as Commodore Dan
- Radcliffe Steele as The Hammer-Thrower
- Elizabeth Garrison as Mrs. Clarence
- Charles Craig as Mr. Clarence
- Colin Campbell as Dickie
- Beth Franklyn as Mrs. Ralston
- Edna Phillips as Mrs. Commodore Dan

== Bibliography ==
- Connelly, Robert B. The Silents: Silent Feature Films, 1910-36, Volume 40, Issue 2. December Press, 1998.
- Munden, Kenneth White. The American Film Institute Catalog of Motion Pictures Produced in the United States, Part 1. University of California Press, 1997.
