= Cheating Cheaters (1927 film) =

1927 film by Edward Laemmle

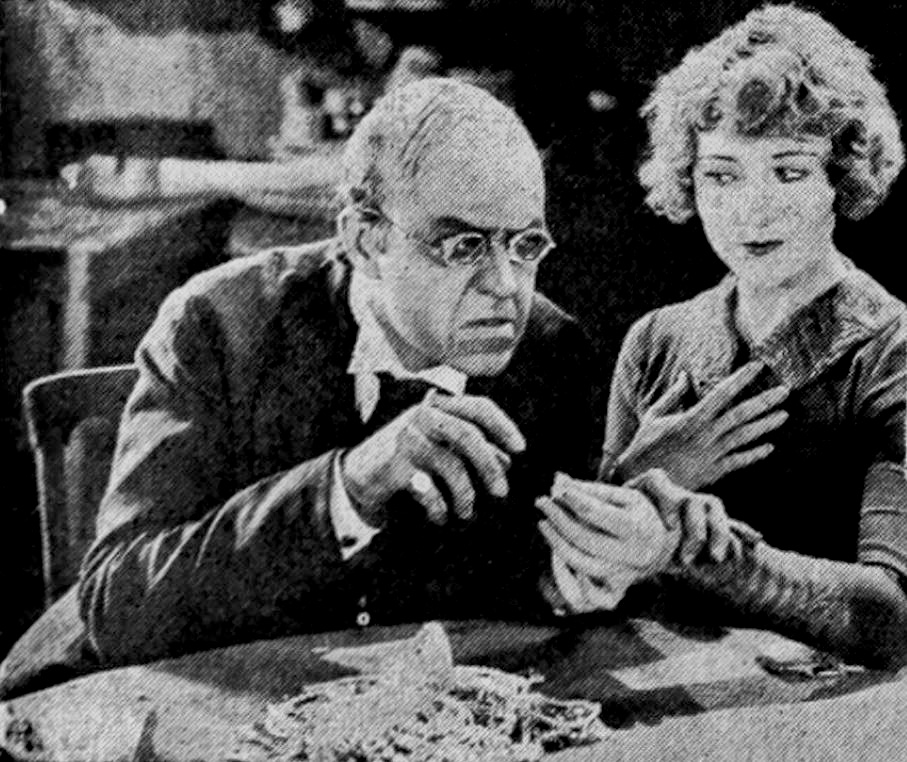
- Still with Littlefield and Compson
- Directed by: Edward Laemmle
- Written by: Charles Logue; James T. O'Donohoe; Walter Anthony
- Based on: Cheating Cheaters by Max Marcin
- Produced by: Carl Laemmle
- Starring: Betty Compson
- Cinematography: Jackson Rose
- Distributed by: Universal Pictures
- Release date: December 5, 1927
- Running time: 60 minutes
- Country: United States
- Language: Silent (English intertitles)

Cheating Cheaters is a 1927 American silent comedy crime film produced and distributed by Universal Pictures. It was directed by Edward Laemmle and starred Betty Compson. This film was based on a 1916 Broadway play of the same name by Max Marcin.

A 1919 film of the same name was also based on Marcin's play. It was produced by and starred Clara Kimball Young. It was adapted for the screen again in 1934 starring Cesar Romero.

== Cast ==
- Betty Compson as Nan Carey
- Kenneth Harlan as Tom Palmer
- Sylvia Ashton as Mrs. Brockton
- Erwin Connelly as Mr. Brockton
- Maude Turner Gordon as Mrs. Palmer
- E. J. Ratcliffe as Mr. Palmer
- Lucien Littlefield as 'Habeas Corpus' Lazarre
- Eddie Gribbon as Steve Wilson
- Cesare Gravina as Tony Verdi

== Preservation ==
Cheating Cheaters is currently presumed lost. In February 2021, the film was cited by the National Film Preservation Board on their Lost U.S. Silent Feature Films list.

As of 2025 there is only on print of Cheating Cheaters located in the arcade in Milestones - living history museum in Basingstoke, England and it is only a short clip of the film, it was uploaded onto YouTube by DB sonic 12 in late 2023, it is a partially found film.
