= Cheating Cheaters (1919 film) =

1919 film by Allan Dwan

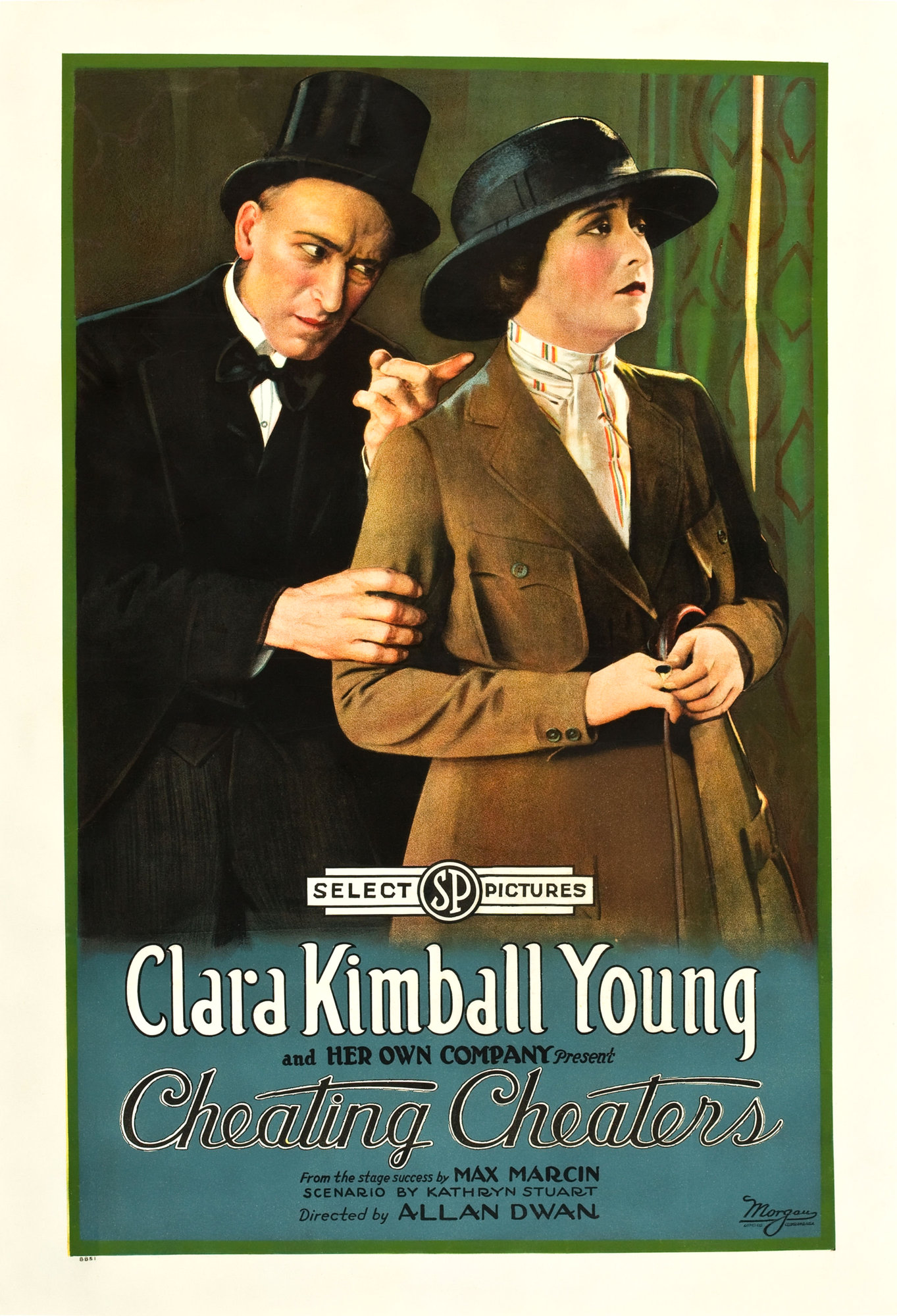
- Film poster
- Directed by: Allan Dwan
- Written by: Kathryn Stuart
- Based on: 1916 Broadway play of the same name by Max Marcin
- Produced by: Clara Kimball Young
- Starring: Jack Holt; Clara Kimball Young
- Cinematography: Arthur Edeson
- Distributed by: Select Pictures
- Release date: January 26, 1919
- Running time: 5 reels
- Country: USA
- Language: Silent...English titles

Cheating Cheaters is a 1919 silent film comedy directed by Allan Dwan and starring Jack Holt and Clara Kimball Young. Young's production company produced. It was released by Select Pictures Corporation.

Kathryn Stuart was the writer, based on a 1916 Broadway play of the same name by Max Marcin. The play would be adapted again in 1927 and in 1934.

== Cast ==
- Jack Holt - Tom Palmer
- Clara Kimball Young - Ruth Brockton
- Tully Marshall - Ira Lazarre
- Frank Campeau - Steven Wilson
- Edwin Stevens - Mr. Palmer
- Anna Q. Nilsson - Grace Palmer
- Frederick Burton - George Brockton
- Nicholas Dunaew - Antonio Verdi
- Mayme Kelso - Mrs. Bockton
- Jess Singleton - Phil
- Elinor Hancock - Mrs. Palmer
- William A. Carroll - Ruth's chauffeur

== Preservation ==
Cheating Cheaters is currently presumed lost. In February of 2021, the film was cited by the National Film Preservation Board on their Lost U.S. Silent Feature Films list.
