= The Naked Truth (1932 film) =

1932 film directed by Karl Anton

- Poster using the film's alternative title
- Directed by: Karl Anton
- Written by: James Montgomery (play); Paul Schiller
- Based on: Nothing But the Truth by Frederic S. Isham
- Starring: Jenny Jugo; Oskar Karlweis; Trude Hesterberg
- Music by: Erwin Straus
- Production company: Paramount Pictures
- Distributed by: Paramount Pictures
- Release date: January 31, 1932
- Running time: 102 minutes
- Country: United States
- Language: German

The Naked Truth (German: Die nackte Wahrheit) is a 1932 American German language comedy film directed by Karl Anton and starring Jenny Jugo, Oskar Karlweis and Trude Hesterberg. It is the German version of the 1929 film Nothing but the Truth. It was also known by the alternative title of Heut' küsst Paris.

It was shot at the Joinville Studios in Paris, where many of Paramount Pictures' multiple-language version were made. A separate French version was also produced.

== Cast ==
- Jenny Jugo
- Oskar Karlweis
- Trude Hesterberg
- Otto Wernicke
- Tibor Halmay
- Hans Adalbert Schlettow
- Alexander Köckert
- Marita Ángeles
- Harry Hardt
- Jaro Fürth
- Harry Nestor
