= Nothing But the Truth (1939 film) =

1939 film

- Directed by: Weyler Hildebrand
- Written by: Weyler Hildebrand; Torsten Lundqvist
- Based on: Nothing But the Truth; 1914 novel by Frederic S. Isham
- Starring: Erik Berglund; Tollie Zellman; Sickan Carlsson
- Cinematography: Ferenc Zádori
- Edited by: Oscar Rosander
- Music by: Sten Axelsson; Jules Sylvain
- Production company: Fribergs Filmbyrå
- Distributed by: Fribergs Filmbyrå
- Release date: 22 May 1939
- Running time: 81 minutes
- Country: Sweden
- Language: Swedish

Nothing But the Truth (Swedish: Rena rama sanningen) is a 1939 Swedish comedy film directed by Weyler Hildebrand and starring Erik Berglund, Tollie Zellman and Sickan Carlsson. It was shot at the Råsunda Studios in Stockholm. The film's sets were designed by the art director Arne Åkermark. It is based on the 1914 novel Nothing But the Truth by American author Frederic S. Isham and its 1916 Broadway adaptation.

== Plot summary ==
Bertil, a bank employee, positively detests that his colleagues lie to customers to sell more bonds. He vows to tell the truth for 24 hours. But his truth-telling is not having the desired effect. It is upsetting almost everybody.

== Cast ==
- Erik Berglund as Banker Ludvig Lund
- Tollie Zellman as Charlotta Lund
- Sickan Carlsson as Märta Lund
- Åke Söderblom as Åke Lund
- Håkan Westergren as Bertil Dahl
- Eric Abrahamsson as Filip Morell
- Marianne Löfgren as Gun Morell
- Hilding Gavle as Josephson
- Maritta Marke as Eva Berg
- Karin Nordgren as Astrid Holm
- Thor Modéen as Police Inspector
- Torsten Winge as Dr. Bruhn
- Richard Lund as Mr. Lagersten
- Douglas Håge as Wholesaler Ström
- Julia Cæsar as Kristin
- Britta Larsson as Ellen, Lunds' Housemaid
- Alice Wallis as Kerstin, Lunds' Housemaid
- Bror Bügler as Actor
- Svea Holst as Shop Assistant
- Artur Cederborgh as Man at Police Station
- Artur Rolén as Man at Police Station
- Ivar Wahlgren as Policeman
- Anna-Stina Wåglund as Telephone Operator

== Bibliography ==
- Wright, Rochelle. The Visible Wall: Jews and Other Ethnic Outsiders in Swedish Film. SIU Press, 1998.
