= Daisy Belmore =

British actress and singer (1874–1954)

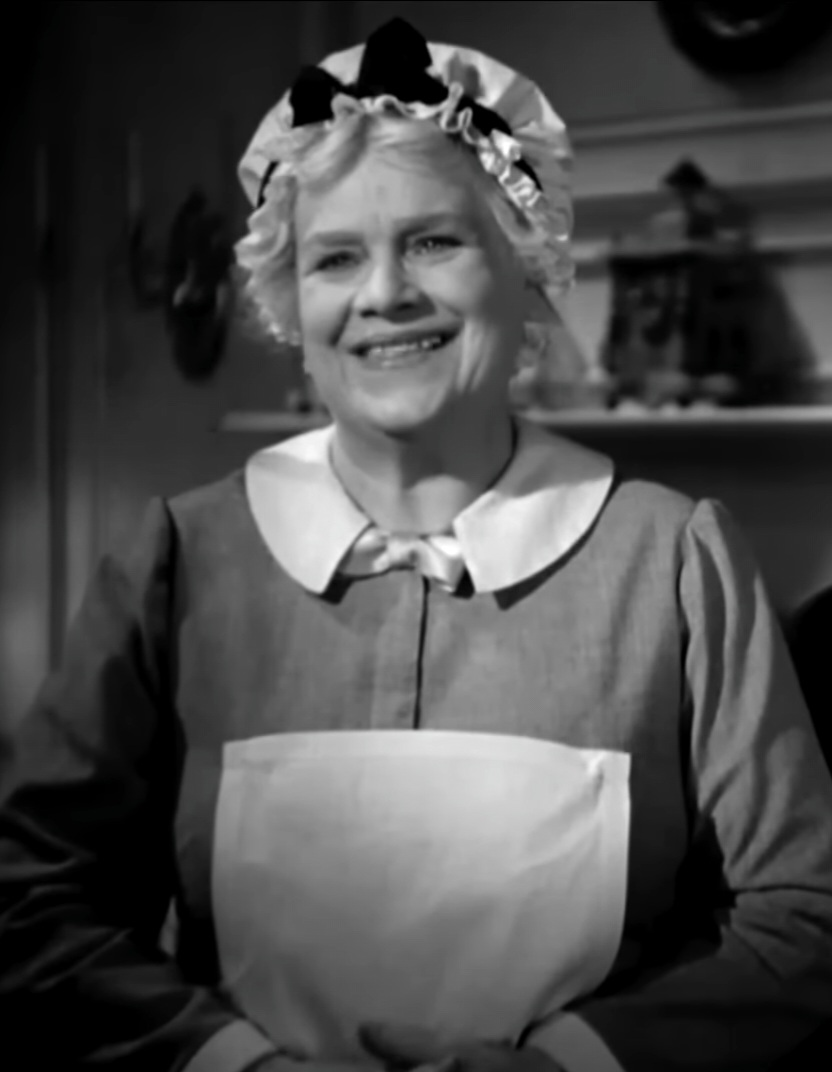
- Belmore in Little Lord Fauntleroy (1936)
- Born: Daisy Gertrude Belmore; 30 June 1874; England
- Died: 12 December 1954 (aged 80); New York City, New York, U.S.
- Occupation: Actress
- Years active: 1882–1954
- Height: 5 ft 8 in (1.73 m)
- Spouse: Samuel Waxman (m. 1902–1942)
- Relatives: Lionel Belmore (brother)

Daisy Belmore (30 June 1874 – 12 December 1954) was an English stage and film actress. Born in England, Belmore moved to the United States in 1910 where she settled, achieving citizenship in 1939 and fame as a leading stage actress, as well as on film. Her career started at the age of 8 and following a break to complete her education, she returned to stage aged 15, touring the world with the Wilson Barrett company to countries including America, Australia and India. Her godmother was Ellen Terry, who was among the most famous actresses of her time.

She first visited the United States in 1910 to appear in the musical comedy Our Miss Gibbs, produced by Charles Frohman and would later work with William Faversham. Her breakthrough role came in 1921 as the character of Old Sweetheart in Three Live Ghosts, as a "gin drinking lovable old mother" which earned her much praise and she was barely recognised in the street following her character's appearance transformation. She was later part of a "strong cast" for the 1928 silent film We Americans and was part of the supporting cast of My Past in 1931, alongside stars including Joan Blondell and Virginia Sale. Belmore helped arrange acting classes in Shakespearean drama for Nellie Bramley, an upcoming Australian stage actress. In June of 1935 she starred in a joint production of the Vine Street Theatre and Harold Lloyd's Beverly Hills Little Theatre for Professionals, "The Widow in Green," directed by Dickson Morgan, and also starring Grace Stafford, Alden Chase, Colin Campbell, and Viola Moore.

She married Melbourne-born Samuel Waxman in 1902 had 2 children, Eric and Ruth, before their separation in 1923 and his death in 1942. Her daughter was also a stage actress and musician, sometimes appearing alongside her mother. One of her brothers was director Lionel Belmore. Belmore died in her apartment at the Wellington Hotel in December 1954 due to a heart attack.

== Early life ==
Belmore was born on 30 June 1874 and baptised on 27 September 1874 in St Marylebone, Westminster, England as Daisy Gertrude Garstin. Her parents were George Benjamin Garstin and Alice Maud Mary Ann Garstin and she was one of seven children. Her godmother was Ellen Terry, who was among the most famous actresses of her time. Belmore did not believe she resembled her mother and in her opinion, took after her father who was a prominent comedian (stage name: George Belmore) and acted alongside his friend Sir Henry Irving. Her paternal grandmother and great-grandparents were all actors on the London stage.

== Career ==
=== 19th century ===
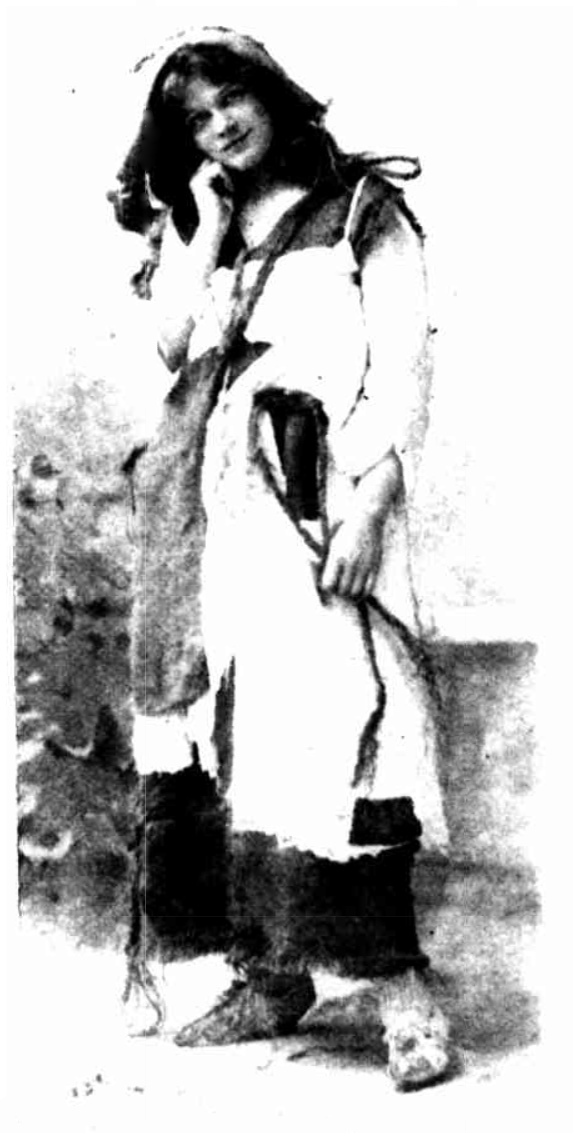
Belmore pictured in 1897

Belmore began her acting career around the age of 8 and by 15, was established as a leading comedienne. She toured globally with Wilson Barrett's company,, with whom she had been affiliated with since the start of her career. In her earlier years, she played child roles alongside her brother and together they acted in The Silver King. During this period, her mother performed "heavy "character parts, her older sister took on comedic roles, and her sister’s husband filled other character roles. Belmore briefly paused her career to attend school, returning to the stage at 15. Her first acting experience as daunting, recalling having only two lines but was so nervous that she could barely whisper them. Afterward, her mother doubted her future on stage, fearing she lacked the necessary voice and talent, and warned that continuing might disgrace the family name.

As part of the Wilson Barrett Company, she toured the world, visiting America several times and had a debut tour of Australia in 1898. She found Australian audiences enthusiastic and responsive to the emotions in the performances.

=== 20th century ===
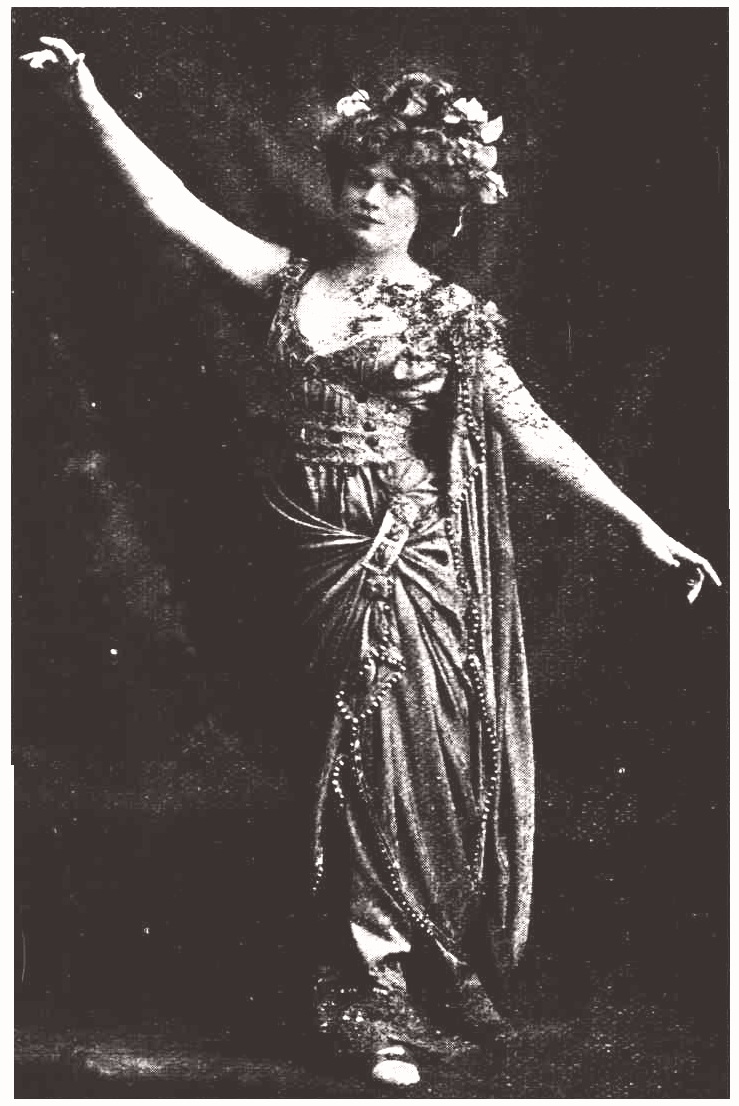
Belmore as Dacia pictured in October 1901

During a tour of Australia in 1901, Belmore played Dacia in The Sign of the Cross. She came to the United States in 1910, having sailed from Southampton, England and arriving in New York on 29 July 1910 to appear in the musical comedy Our Miss Gibbs, which was produced by Charles Frohman. She later worked with William Faversham in a 1911 production of The Faun, alongside her brothers.

In 1921, Belmore achieved significant acclaim for her role as Old Sweetheart in Three Live Ghosts, where she portrayed a "gin drinking lovable old mother" with such skill that she received widespread praise. For this role, she dramatically altered her appearance, so much so that she was unrecognisable to those who had seen the play, leading to concerns that people might mistake her stage disfigurement for her actual looks. She was known for her good looks which was not in keeping with her character.

Belmore returned to Australia in 1927 after 17 years of residing in New York, during which time she had gained considerable fame in America. She was impressed by Sydney’s progress, describing it as "simply marvelous." Known for her mature judgment and candid opinions, she gave an insightful interview during her visit. In 1928, she joined a "strong cast" for the silent film We Americans, starred in the drama film Seven Days Leave in 1930 and in 1931, was in the supporting cast of My Past, alongside stars such as Joan Blondell and Virginia Sale. She also mentored Nellie Bramley, an emerging Australian stage actress, particularly in Shakespearean drama.

Outside of films, Belmore was also a theatre actress, having directed and toured for 40 weeks with The Vagabond King, primarily in Chicago. In 1932, she toured with the "largest dramatic road show" in a production of The Apple Cart by George Bernard Shaw. Other plays she appeared in or directed include Angel Street, Best of Spirits, and His Makers. Her last performance on Broadway was in the 1951 play The Rose Tattoo.

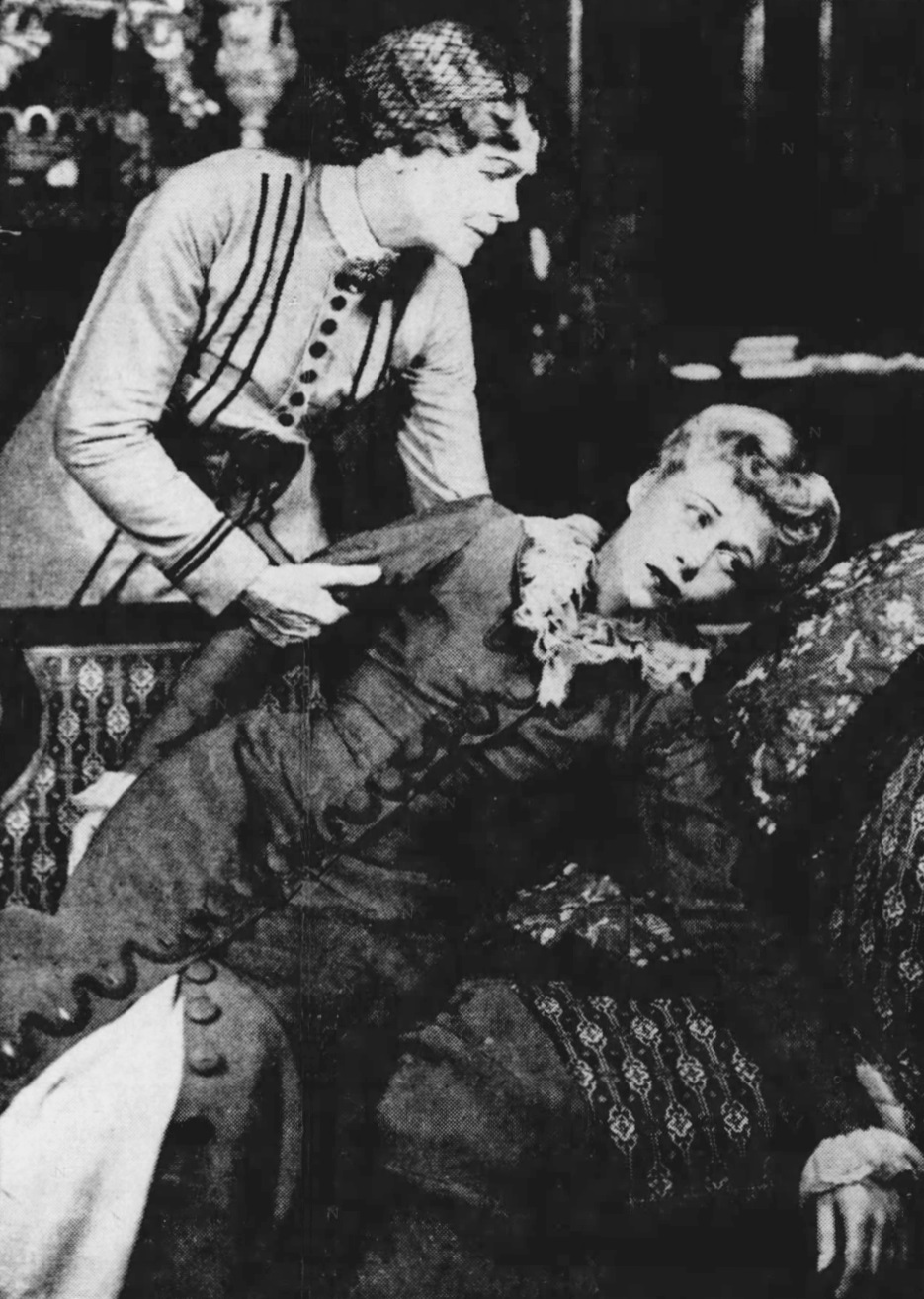
Daisy Belmore as the servant in Angel Street, 1943

Her career as an actress and director took her to various countries, including Australia, Africa, and India. By the late 1940s, she was director of New York's American Theater and in 1947, presented Little Women at Huntingdon College as a public service.

== Personal life ==
Belmore sought American citizenship in December 1939, petitioning in the state of New York, having lived there since July 1910.

Belmore's brother was director Lionel Belmore, who died the year before her in Hollywood in 1953. She also had another brother, Herbert, who had died in 1951. She used to play tennis and football with her brothers during her time in America.

She was married to Melbourne-born Samuel Waxman (April 1869 – March 1942) on 19 April 1902, but they separated in 1923. She had 2 children to Waxman, a boy Eric born in 1905 and a girl Ruth born in 1906. Her daughter was also a stage actress and musician, sometimes appearing alongside her mother, having made her debut at an early age. Belmore measured 5 feet 8 inches (1.73 m) in height and had blue eyes.

== Death ==
Belmore died in her apartment at the Wellington Hotel on 12 December 1954, at the age of 80 due to a heart attack. She had been unwell with a heart condition for several years and lived alone during her later years, following the deaths of her two brothers. She was survived by her two children, Ruth and Eric.

== Selected acting credits ==
- Bab's Burglar (1917)
- Bab's Matinee Idol (1917)
- Three Live Ghosts (play, 1921)
- The Dancers (play, 1924)
- We Americans (1928)
- Seven Days Leave (1930)
- Alias French Gertie (1930)
- Scarlet Pages (1930)
- Ten Nights in a Bar-Room (1931)
- My Past (1931)
- The Rose Tattoo (play, 1951)
