= Do Something (disambiguation) =

Do Something is a non-profit organization with the goal of motivating young people.

Do Something may refer to:

- "Do Something" (1929 song), performed by Helen Kane in the movie Nothing But the Truth
- "Do Something" (Macy Gray song), a 1999 song by Macy Gray on the album On How Life Is
- "Do Somethin'", a 2004 song by Britney Spears on the album Greatest_Hits: My Prerogative
- "Do Something", a 2007 song the Eagles on the album Long Road out of Eden
- "Do Something", a 2008 song by Pepper on the album Pink Crustaceans and Good Vibrations
- "Do Something", a 2012 song by Matthew West on the album Into The Light
- "Do Something", a 2019 song by Rocket Punch on their EP Pink Punch
