= Yes, Yes, Yvette =

Musical by Irving Caesar, Philip Charig and Ben Jerome

Yes, Yes, Yvette is a musical in three acts with lyrics by Irving Caesar and music by Philip Charig and Ben Jerome. James Montgomery and William Cary Duncan co-authored the musical's book which was based on Montgomery's 1916 play Nothing But the Truth which was in turn based on Frederic S. Isham's 1914 novel Nothing But the Truth. Producer Harry Frazee envisioned the work as a follow-up to the 1925 hit musical No, No, Nanette, a work which he had brought to the stage, and the work was billed as a companion piece to Nanette. Many of the cast members from Nanette's successful Chicago production also starred in Yvette.

== Performance history ==
Yes, Yes, Yvette premiered in Chicago at the Four Cohans Theatre on December 5, 1926. Like its predecessor No, No, Nanette, the musical was warmly received by Chicago audiences but not by New York City ones, and had a much longer stage life in the Windy City. The premiere cast included Jeanette MacDonald as Yvette Ralston, Lynne Overman as Robert Bennett, Herbert Corthell as S. M. Ralston, Leo Henning as Dick Donnelly, Jere Delaney as Mr. Van Dusen, Arnold Lucy as Bishop Doran, Leslie Stiles as J. P. Clark, Grace Studiford as Mrs. Ralston, Amy Revere as Ethel Clark, Helen Lynd as Mabel Terry, and Madelyn Killeen as Sabel Terry.

After several months of performances in Boston and Philadelphia, Yes, Yes, Yvette opened on Broadway at the Sam H. Harris Theatre on October 3, 1927. A flop in New York, it played for just 40 performances at that theatre, closing on November 5, 1927. The Broadway cast starred Jeanette MacDonald as Yvette Ralston, Jack Whiting as Robert Bennett, Charles Winninger as S. M. Ralston, Roland Woodruff as Dick Donnelly, Joseph Herbert as Mr. Van Dusen, Arnold Lucy as Bishop Doran, Frederick B. Manatt J. P. Clark, Virginia Howell as Mrs. Ralston, Brenda Bond as Ethel Clark, Helen Lynd as Mabel Terry, and Dorothy Waterman as Sabel Terry. Sammy Lee choreographed the Broadway production.

== Plot ==
Yes, Yes, Yvette takes place on Presidents' Day in Palm Beach, Florida.

== Bibliography ==
- Bordman, Gerald (2001). American Musical Theater: A Chronicle. Oxford University Press. ISBN 9780195130744.
- Dietz, Dan (2019). "Yes, Yes, Yvette". The Complete Book of 1920s Broadway Musicals. Rowman & Littlefield Publishers. ISBN 9781538112823.
