= Ned Sparks =

Actor (1883-1957)

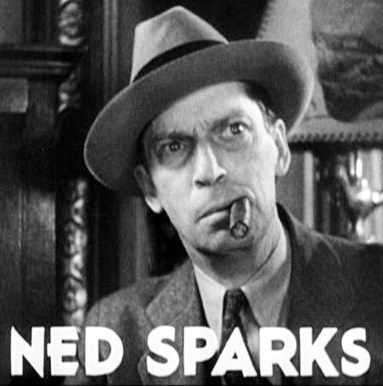
- Sparks in a Trailer for Gold Diggers of 1933
- Born: Edward Arthur Sparkman; November 19, 1883; Guelph, Ontario, Canada
- Died: April 3, 1957 (aged 73); Victorville, California, US
- Occupation: Actor
- Years active: 1912-1956
- Spouse: Mercedes Cabalerro (1931-1936)

Ned Sparks (born Edward Arthur Sparkman, November 19, 1883 – April 3, 1957) was a Canadian character actor of the American stage and screen. He was known for his deadpan expression, frequently sarcastic characters and a comically nasal, monotone delivery.

== Life and career ==
Sparks was born in Guelph, Ontario, but moved to St. Thomas, Ontario, where he grew up. He left home at 16 and attempted prospecting in the Klondike Gold Rush. After running out of money, he began performing. Billed as a "Singer of Sweet Southern Songs" and costumed in a straw hat, short pants and bare feet, he won a spot as a singer on a travelling musical company's tour. At 19, he returned to Canada and briefly attended a Toronto seminary. He then worked for the railway and in theatre in Toronto. In 1907, he moved to New York City to try his hand in the Broadway theatre, where he appeared in his first show in 1912.

On Broadway, Sparks developed his trademark deadpan expression while portraying a hotel clerk in the play Little Miss Brown. His success caught the attention of Metro-Goldwyn-Mayer studio head Louis B. Mayer, who signed him to a six-picture deal. Sparks appeared in numerous silent films before making his "talkie" debut in The Big Noise (1928). From 1915 to 1947 he appeared in some 90 pictures.

In the 1930s, Sparks became known for portraying dour-faced, sarcastic, cigar-chomping characters. He became so associated with the type that, in 1936, The New York Times reported that Sparks had his face insured for $100,000 with Lloyd's of London. Sparks later admitted the story was a publicity stunt and he was insured for only $10,000. In another stunt, the studio offered a reward of $10,000 to anyone who could capture Sparks smiling in a photograph.

Sparks is particularly known for the wry, comic characters he portrayed in iconic pre-Code Hollywood pictures, mostly as a contract player at Warner Bros., such as Blessed Event (1932), 42nd Street (1933), Gold Diggers of 1933 (1933), Lady for a Day (1933), and Sing and Like It (1934).

Sparks was often caricatured in cartoons, including the Jack-in-the-Box character in the Disney short Broken Toys (1935), the jester in Mother Goose Goes Hollywood (1938), a hermit crab in both Tex Avery's Fresh Fish (1939) and Bob Clampett's Goofy Groceries (1941), a chicken in Bob Clampett's Slap Happy Pappy (1940), Friz Freleng's Warner Bros. cartoon Malibu Beach Party (1940), and Tex Avery's Hollywood Steps Out (1941). He also voiced the cartoon characters Heckle and Jeckle in 1950.

Sparks appeared in ten Broadway productions and over 80 films. He retired from films in 1947, saying that everyone should retire at 65.

Sparks is a relative of Canadian comedian Ron Sparks.

== Death ==
Sparks died in Victorville, California, on April 3, 1957, from the effects of an intestinal blockage.

== Complete filmography ==
Year	Title	Role	Notes
1915	The Little Miss Brown	Night clerk	Short; Lost film
1919	The Social Pirate	Harry Barnes	
1919	A Temperamental Wife	The Hotel Clerk	
1919	A Virtuous Vamp	Mr. Bell	
1920	Nothing But the Truth	The Monocle Man	Lost film
1920	In Search of a Sinner	Waiter	Lost film
1920	The Perfect Woman	Grimes, the Anarchist	
1920	Good References	Peter Stearns	
1922	A Wide Open Town	Si Ryan	Lost film
1922	The Bond Boy	Cyrus Morgan	Lost film
1923	Easter Bonnets		Short; Lost film
1924	One Night It Rained		Short; Lost film
1924	The Law Forbids	Clyde Vernon	Incomplete film
1925	Asleep in the Deep		Short; Lost film
1925	The Boomerang	Bert Hanks	
1925	His Supreme Moment	Adrian	Lost film
1925	Faint Perfume	Orrin Crumb	Lost film
1925	Seven Keys to Baldpate	Bland	Lost film
1925	Bright Lights	Barney Gallagher	Lost film
1925	The Only Thing	Gibson	Alternative title: Four Flaming Days
1925	Soul Mates	Tancred's chauffeur	
1926	Mike	Slinky	Lost film
1926	The Auction Block	Nat Saluson	Lost film
1926	Money Talks	Lucius Fenton	Incomplete film
1926	The Hidden Way	Mulligan	
1926	When the Wife's Away		
1926	Love's Blindness	Valet	Lost film
1926	Oh, What a Night!	"Slickry" Benton	Lost film
1926	Twinkletoes		
1927	The Secret Studio	The Plumber	Lost film
1927	Alias the Deacon	"Slim" Sullivan	
1927	Alias the Lone Wolf	Phinuit	
1927	The Small Bachelor	J. Hamilton Beamish	Lost film
1928	On to Reno	Herbert Holmes	Lost film
1928	The Big Noise	William Howard	Lost film
1928	Alias the Deacon	Slim Sullivan	
1928	The Magnificent Flirt	Tim	Lost film
1929	The Canary Murder Case	Tony Sheel	
1929	Strange Cargo	Yacht First Mate	
1929	Nothing But the Truth	Clarence van Dyke	
1929	Street Girl	Happy Winter	
1929	Love Comes Along	Happy	
1930	Double Cross Roads	Happy Max	
1930	The Devil's Holiday	Charlie Thorne	
1930	The Fall Guy	Dan Walsh	
1930	Conspiracy	Winthrop Clavering	
1930	Leathernecking	Sparks	
1931	Kept Husbands	Hughie Hanready	
1931	Iron Man	Riley	
1931	The Secret Call	Bert Benedict	
1931	The Way of All Fish	Ned	Short
1931	Strife of the Party		Short
1931	Corsair	Slim	
1931	The Wide Open Spaces	Sheriff Jack Rancid	Short
1932	Big Dame Hunting	Ned	Short
1932	The Miracle Man	Harry Evans	
1932	Blessed Event	George Moxley	
1932	Big City Blues	"Stacky" Stackhouse	
1932	The Crusader	Eddie Crane	
1933	42nd Street	Barry	
1933	Secrets	Sunshine	
1933	Gold Diggers of 1933	Barney Hopkins	
1933	Lady for a Day	Happy McGuire	
1933	Too Much Harmony	Lem Spawn	
1933	Alice in Wonderland	The Caterpillar	
1933	Going Hollywood	Bert Conroy	Alternative title: Cinderella's Fella
1934	Hi, Nellie!	Shammy	
1934	Sing and Like It	Toots McGuire	
1934	Private Scandal	Inspector Riordan	
1934	Down to Their Last Yacht	Captain "Sunny Jim" Roberts	
1934	Servants' Entrance	Hjalmar Gnu	
1934	Marie Galante	Plosser	
1934	Imitation of Life	Elmer Smith	
1934	Sweet Adeline	Dan Herzig	
1935	Sweet Music	"Ten Percent" Nelson	
1935	George White's 1935 Scandals	Elmer White	
1936	Collegiate	"Scoop" Oakland	
1936	Two's Company	Al	
1936	The Bride Walks Out	Paul Dodson	
1937	One in a Million	Daniel "Danny" Simpson	
1937	Wake Up and Live	Steve Cluskey	
1937	This Way Please	Inky Wells	
1938	Hawaii Calls	Strings	
1939	The Star Maker	Speed King	
1941	For Beauty's Sake	Jonathan B. Sweet	
1943	Stage Door Canteen	Cameo as himself	
1947	Magic Town	Ike	
