= The Nutcracker (1926 film) =

1926 film

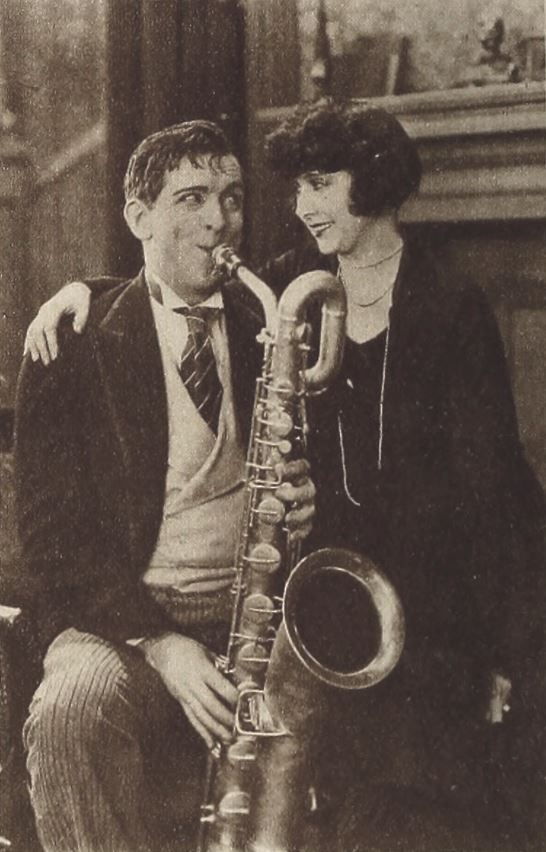
- Still with Horton and Busch
- Directed by: Lloyd Ingraham
- Written by: Madge Myton
- Based on: The Nut Cracker by Frederic S. Isham
- Starring: Edward Everett Horton; Mae Busch; Harry Myers
- Cinematography: Jack MacKenzie
- Production company: Samuel S. Hutchinson Productions
- Distributed by: Associated Exhibitors; Ideal Films (UK)
- Release date: March 28, 1926
- Running time: 60 minutes
- Country: United States
- Language: Silent (English intertitles)

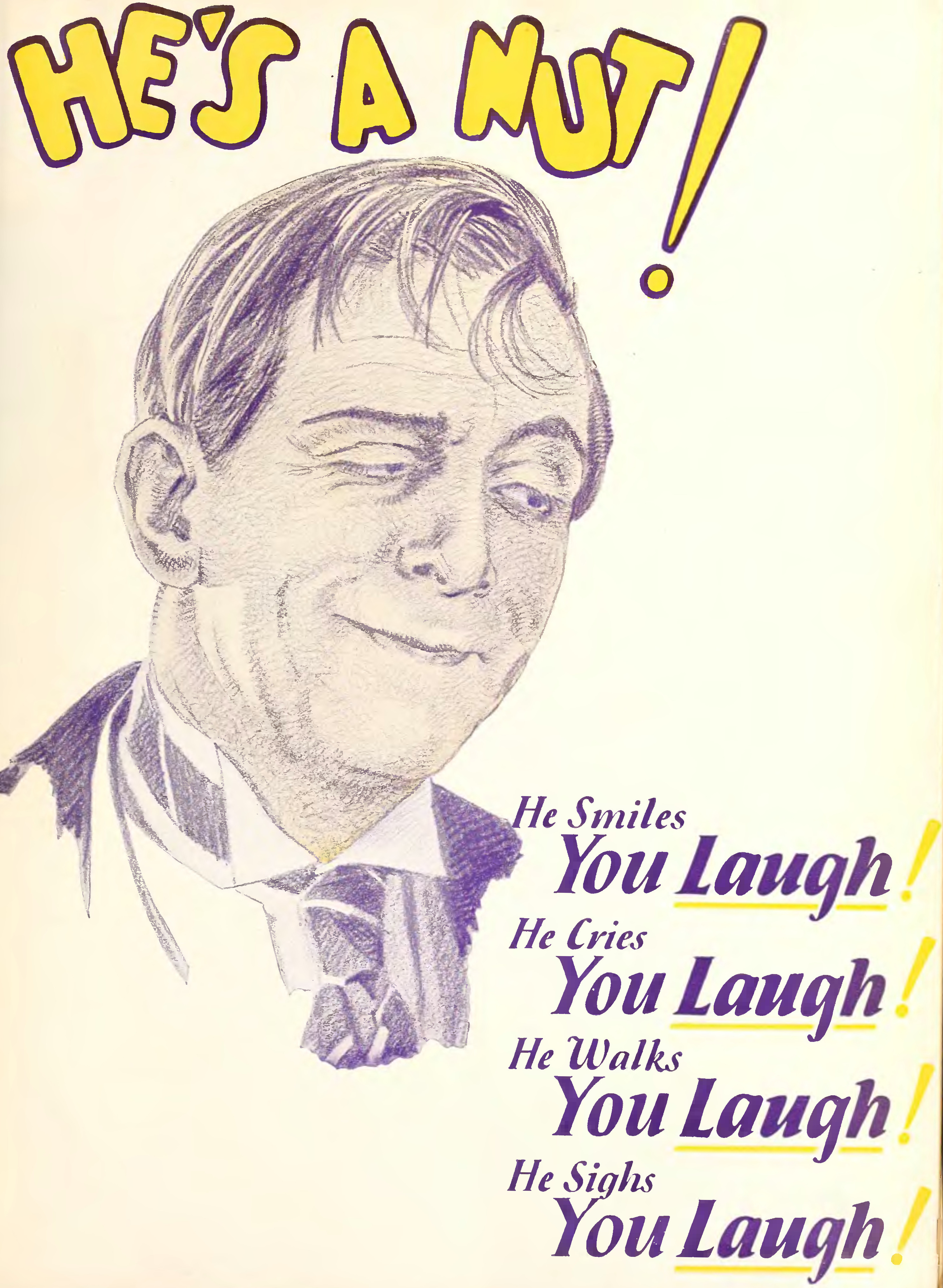
The Nut-Cracker ad in Motion Picture News, 1926

The Nutcracker (also written as The Nut-Cracker) is a 1926 American silent comedy film directed by Lloyd Ingraham and starring Edward Everett Horton, Mae Busch, and Harry Myers. It was based on the 1920 novel The Nut Cracker by Frederic S. Isham.

== Plot ==
As described in a film magazine review, Horatio Slipaway is henpecked at home by his wife Martha while in her gingham apron and abused at his office. He flees from home to escape his domineering wife and is injured by a streetcar. Awakening in a hospital, he is given $500 to settle the accident case. He feigns amnesia and, pretending he has lost all of his memory, gives his name as Pete Peters of Peru. He takes a flyer in the stock market when he saunters into a broker's office and cleans up by buying the lowest-quoted stock on the board and wins a fortune. Horatio takes an apartment, furnished a la Peru. He holds a reception which is attended by his wife whom he falls in love with again but keeps up his new role. Eventually his identity is discovered by his wife. Determined to make her husband "come out of it," she has him kidnapped and arranges for three surgeons to be waiting for him at his old home. Threatened with an operation to restore memory, he admits that he is Horatio. A happy reunion ensues.

== Cast ==
- Edward Everett Horton as Horatio Slipaway
- Mae Busch as Martha Slipaway
- Harry Myers as Oscar Briggs
- Tom Ricketts as Isaac Totten
- Martha Mattox as Julia Trotten
- George Kuwa as Saki
- Katherine Lewis as Hortense
- Albert Prisco as Señor Gonzales
- George Periolat as Señor Gómez

== Preservation ==
With no prints of The Nutcracker located in any film archives, it is a lost film.

== Bibliography ==
- Connelly, Robert B. The Silents: Silent Feature Films, 1910-36, Volume 40, Issue 2. December Press, 1998.
- Munden, Kenneth White. The American Film Institute Catalog of Motion Pictures Produced in the United States, Part 1. University of California Press, 1997.
