= The Nutcracker, International Television Contest for Young Musicians =

Annual music competition

The Nutcracker International Television Contest for Young Musicians is an annual music competition, organized by "Russia K" (Rossia-Kultura) state TV channel, a branch of the VGTRK. The contest, according to its rules, is internationalcompetition and is open to participants from all countries.

First held in 2000, the contest became a recognized event in the Russian music world. The multimillion audience follows with interest in the competition of the participants day after day, and "Russia K" TV channel transmits the Gala Closing concert live.

The contest is limited to a solo performance of classical music and has three fields: piano, strings (violin, cello, harp) and winds and percussions (except for block flute).

The Nutcracker winner represents Russia at the Eurovision Young Musicians Competition, as the "Russia K" channel is a member of the EBU.

The musicians of modern age (Galina Vishnevskaya, Vladimir Spivakov, Vladimir Kraynev, Yuri Bashmet, Vladimir Fedoseyev, Alexander Rudin, Denis Matsuyev, Dmitri Khvorostovsky, Nikolay Petrov, Ignat Solzhenitsyn) support the contest, working as adjudicators and providing special prizes and grants.

Gifted children from all over the world have an opportunity not only to show themselves as serious musicians but also to get acquainted, to change their experiences and to perform on the same stage with world-class musicians - the final round of the contest is accompanied by the best Russian orchestras.

The contest traditionally starts with the beginning of Russian autumn school vacations, early November and take place in the Central Music School (College) of Moscow State P.I. Tchaikovsky Conservatory's halls with the Finale at the Tchaikovsky Concert hall.

The deadline for entries in 2011 was August 10.

== Winners ==
=== 2015 ===
Strings: I prize, «Gold Nutcracker» - Leia Zhu (Newcastle upon Tyne, United Kingdom)); II prize, «Silver Nutcracker» - Eugene Kawai (Tokyo, Japan); III prize, «Bronze Nutcracker» - Eduard Kollert (Prague, Czech Republic) .

Winds and percussions: I prize, «Gold Nutcracker» - Timofei Yakhnov (Saint-Petersburg); II prize, «Silver Nutcracker» - Andrei Ryazantsev (Moscow); III prize, «Bronze Nutcracker» - Mikhail Petukhov (Moscow).

Piano: I prize, «Gold Nutcracker» - Maxim Lando (Great Neck, USA); II prize, «Silver Nutcracker» - Varvara Kutuzova (Moscow); III prize, «Bronze Nutcracker» - Nikolai Varlamov (Moscow).

=== 2010 ===
Strings: I prize, «Gold Nutcracker» - Lizi Ramishvili (Tbilisi, Georgia); II prize, «Silver Nutcracker» - Alexander Shapchits (Moscow, Russia); III prize, «Bronze Nutcracker» - Mijhail Dormidontov (Serpukhov, Russia).

Winds and percussions: I prize, «Gold Nutcracker» - Matvey Sherling (Moscow, Russia); II prize, «Silver Nutcracker» - Maxim Savran (Cheboksary, Russia); III prize, «Bronze Nutcracker» - Vilhelm Patrick Skabardis (Riga, Latvia).

Piano: I prize, «Gold Nutcracker» - Daniil Kharitonov (Moscow, Russia); II prize, «Silver Nutcracker» - Nikita Korovin (surgut, Russia); III prize, «Bronze Nutcracker» - Alina Zhilina (Barnaul, Russia).

Audience award - Nikita Korovin (Russia).

=== 2009 ===
Strings: I prize, «Gold Nutcracker» - Iskandeor Khannanov (Ufa, Russia) and Grégoire Girard(France); II prize, «Silver Nutcracker» - Tatiana Kryachkova (Barnaul, Russia); III prize, «Bronze Nutcracker» - none.

Winds and percussions: I prize, «Gold Nutcracker» - none; II prize, «Silver Nutcracker» - Valentin Kochetkov (Moscow, Russia) and Denis Kokorin (Bratsk, Russia); III prize, «Bronze Nutcracker» - Arseniy Tsoy (Saratov, Russia).

Piano: I prize, «Gold Nutcracker» - Vasiliy Salnikov (Moscow, Russia); II prize, «Silver Nutcracker» - Maximilian Karl Kromer (Austria); III prize, «Bronze Nutcracker» - Gregory Martin (USA).

Special prize «Young musician of the year» - Iskandeor Khannanov, Children Jury award - Denis Kokorin, Audience award - Vasiliy Salnikov.

== Facts and figures ==
- The Contest Nutcracker was held sixteen times from 2000.
- More than 500 young musicians from 83 Russian cities and from 23 countries took part in the contest.
- There were 171 applications from all over the world at the XVI Nutcracker International Contest.
- There were 156 applications from 19 countries all over the world at the XIth Nutcracker International Contest.
- 6 laureates were awarded with the Grand-Prix, 32 finalists with the Gold Nutcracker, 37 - the Silver Nutcracker and 29 - the Bronze Nutcracker.
- More than 50,000 viewers visited the Contest auditions during this period.
- Russia K TV Channel has broadcast more than 150 programs about the contest, including live shows and web-broadcasting.
- The finalists were accompanied by world-famous Russian orchestras such as the Moscow Chamber Orchestra Musica Viva, the State Chamber Orchestra Virtuosos of Moscow, the Tchaikovsky State Academic Grand Symphony Orchestra, the State Academic Symphony Orchestra of Russia named after Evgeny Svetlanov.
- The finalists shared the stage with the eminent modern conductors: Vladimir Fedoseyev, Alexander Rudin, Saulius Sondeckis, Mark Gorenstein, Sergey Stadler.
- The famous performers, conductors, composers and teachers participated in its Jury: Vera Gornostayeva, Sergey Dorensky, Svetlana Bezrodnaya, Alexsander Tchaikovsky, Mark Pekarsky, Igor Butman, Denis Shapovalov, Arkady Shilkloper, Ignat Solzhenitsyn, Denis Matsuev, Sergei Nakariakov, Ekaterina Mechetina, Alena Baeva.
