= We Americans =

1928 film

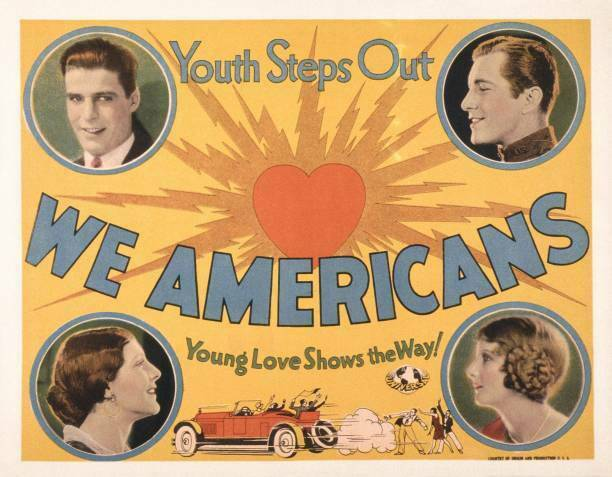
- Lobby card
- Directed by: Edward Sloman
- Written by: Alfred A. Cohn; Edward Sloman
- Based on: We Americans by Milton Herbert Gropper and Max Siegel
- Produced by: Carl Laemmle Jr.
- Starring: George Sidney; Patsy Ruth Miller; George J. Lewis
- Cinematography: Jackson Rose
- Edited by: Robert Jahns
- Production company: Universal Pictures
- Distributed by: Universal Pictures
- Release date: March 28, 1928
- Running time: 90 minutes
- Country: United States
- Language: Silent (English intertitles)

We Americans is a 1928 American silent drama film directed by Edward Sloman and starring George Sidney, Patsy Ruth Miller, and George J. Lewis. A young Andy Devine plays an early small role as Pat O'Dougal.

== Plot ==
Two young couples try to cross the mixed ethnic divide in America, something which is only resolved when World War I reveals the truth of American society's melting pot.

== Cast ==
- George Sidney as Mr. Levine
- Patsy Ruth Miller as Beth Levine
- George J. Lewis as Phil Levine
- Eddie Phillips as Pete Albertini
- Beryl Mercer as Mrs. Levine
- John Boles as Hugh Bradleigh
- Albert Gran as Mr. Schmidt
- Michael Visaroff as Mr. Albertini
- Kathlyn Williams as Mrs. Bradleigh
- Edward Martindel as Mr. Bradleigh
- Josephine Dunn as Helen Bradleigh
- Daisy Belmore as Mrs. Schmidt
- Rosita Marstini as Mrs. Albertini
- Andy Devine as Pat O'Dougal
- Flora Bramley as Sara Schmidt
- John Bleifer as Korn

== Production ==
Producer Carl Laemmle Jr. purchased the film rights to the play We Americans in support of the efforts of Will H. Hays, head of the Motion Picture Producers and Distributors of America, to further the more rapid Americanization of immigrants within the United States. Hays organized a group of experts to advise director Sloman on the film. The initial outline for the film had immigrants from Russia settling in the United States but maintaining their native language and customs, while their children became assimilated through attended American high school, with the resulting family conflict.

== Preservation ==
With no prints of We Americans located in any film archives, it is considered a lost film.

== Bibliography ==
- Erens, Patricia (1984).The Jew in American Cinema. Indiana University Press. ISBN 0-253-20493-3
- Munden, Kenneth White (1997). The American Film Institute Catalog of Motion Pictures Produced in the United States, Part 1. University of California Press.
