= Nellie Bramley =

British actress and singer

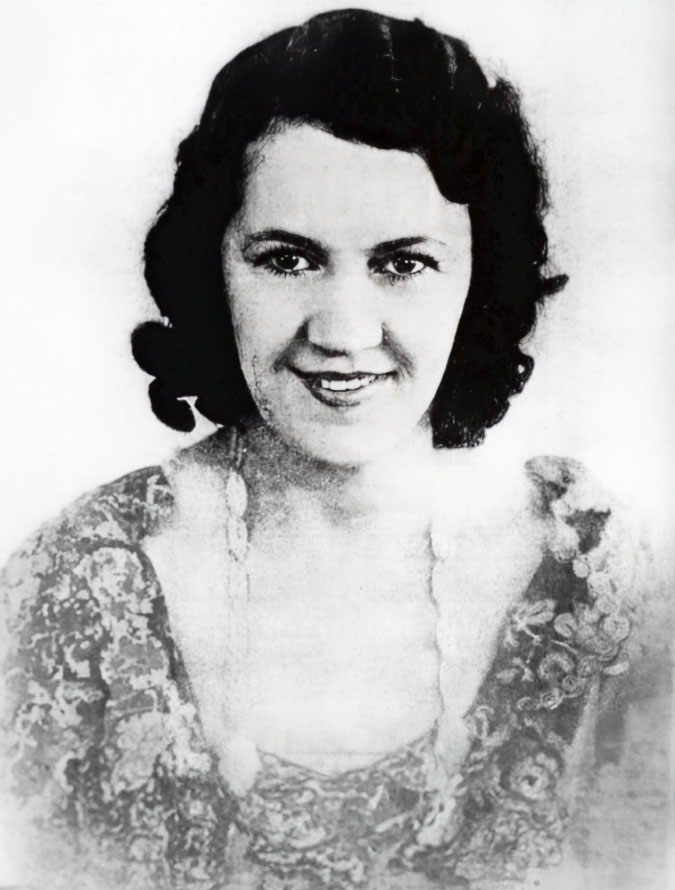
- Nellie Bramley aged 19, c1909
- Born: Ellen Odelle Bramley; 4 February 1890; Richmond, Victoria, Melbourne
- Died: 9 June 1982 (aged 92)
- Occupation: Actress
- Years active: 1905–1943
- Spouse: William Russell (m. 1914)

Ellen "Nellie" Odelle Bramley (4 February 1890 – 9 June 1982) was an Australian stage actress who gained prominence during the early 20th century as a leading actress on stage and opened the Palace Theatre, Melbourne around 1914. Bramley was the first female Australian to establish her own theatre company in 1922, named after herself and which toured all of Australia, as well as New Zealand and Tasmania. Her earlier years touring New Zealand and Tasmania were successful, with sell-out performances in Launceston, Tasmania where at the time, she was the youngest star to have ever visited the city.

Around 1930, she considered cancelling some performances due to the effects of the great depression, citing low audience numbers. Following financial difficulties and low ticket sales, Bramley filed for bankruptcy in May 1934, with unpaid debts around £3,250 mostly incurred from previous show losses. She attributed the situation to meagre takings during some theatrical tours and announced her intention to semi-retire from full-time stage performing, although continued acting to a lesser extent until her last performance around 1943.

Bramley was married to William Russell who acted as her company's manager, but they separated in the late 1920s. She revisited the Palace Theatre in 1974 during its reopening after being saved from demolition. She died in 1982.

== Early life ==
Bramley was born in Richmond, Victoria in February 1890. Her mother was Louisa Odelle Burchall, an analytical chemist while her father was a well-known veterinary surgeon.

== Career ==
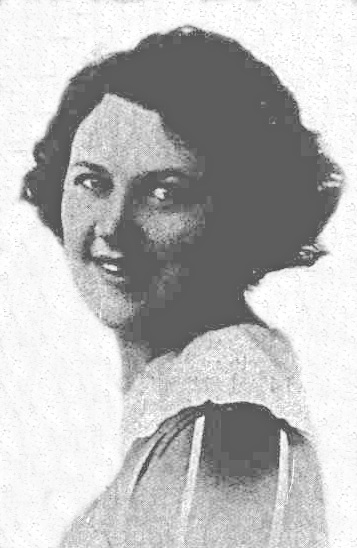
Nellie Bramley, c1924

As a schoolgirl and an upcoming stage actress, Bramley received opportunities in Shakespearean drama acting classes by Daisy Belmore, who was well known as a stage actress in America, the United Kingdom and Australia. Bramley had won various prizes for her "elocutionary talents", although did not claim to be a special talent. She began regular work on the stage under the company of George Marlow's management and played minor roles in an apprenticeship capacity for a short time, her first role on stage being aged 14 as the maid in East Lynne. Opportunities to secure larger roles in leading dramas was interrupted when she contracted a severe illness. although she recovered and secured a role in Ready Money at the Criterion. Her first feature-length film role was in the 1911 film The Bells.

For a number of years, she played in Melbourne at the Princess and Palace Theatres, the latter which she opened some time around 1914. Bramley was expected to learn a new play every week over the course of a 44-week season, with an audience comprising people she knew, who would book the same seats every week. She came to know them like family and some would even gift her home-made clothing, such as stockings and night wear. When she would ride in an open car, traffic and trams had to be stopped for her to pass through.

=== Own company ===
She was the first female Australian to own her own professional theatre company, The Nellie Bramley Company, which she founded in 1922 with her husband William Russell, who had spent around 20 years as a business manager for J. C. Williamson. The new company began with a successful six month tour New Zealand, before returning to Melbourne with the comedy drama Sunday at the Playhouse. Her husband intended upon establishing the playhouse theatre as a place for producing good drama. She visited Tasmania for the first time in May 1923, with sell-out performances at the booking office in Launceston. At the time, she was the youngest star to have ever visited Tasmania.

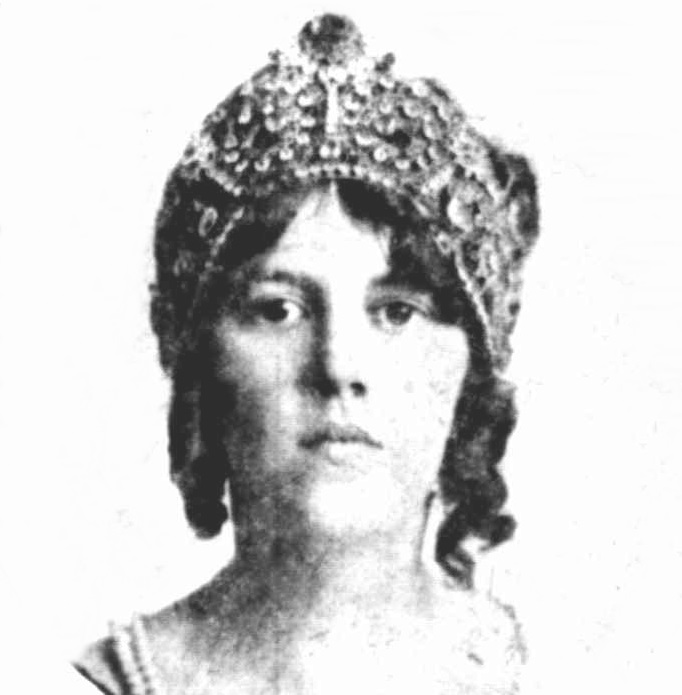
Nellie Bramley as Empress Josephine, April 1924

The company had toured all parts of Australia by 1925, with New South Wales being the last place to visit. She featured in a mid-1920s promotional campaign to promote a soap product by Rexona. By 1928, her company had established themselves among the favourites at the Theatre Royal. A notable attribute considered by some in 1930 was her spontaneity, such as when portraying characters being serious or emotional. She was described at the time as having "a charming stage personality". In June that year, she made a decision to abandon her programme of plays at the Grand Opera House, citing low audience numbers attributed to restricted spending due to the great depression. After reflecting on her decision and the potential impact in putting 50 people out of work, she changed her mind and decided "to be like Amy Johnson, and see it through". By the time her season in Brisbane was concluded, she had completed a record 104 weeks during its run, which included producing 94 shows.

=== Bankruptcy ===
Following financial difficulties and low ticket sales, Bramley filed for bankruptcy in May 1934, noting her unpaid debts were £3250 with assets worth just £700. She attributed the situation to meagre takings during some theatrical tours that on some occasions did not even cover theatre rent and advertisement costs. Often, members of her company would have to take a significant cut in pay if ticket receipts were low, although she would pay the full salary if receipts were at least satisfactory. She noted that although her season in Brisbane around 1932 was "a marvellous success", she lost money immediately thereafter during a tour of North Queensland and returned to Sydney where more money was further lost. She had some success during a 67-week tour of Melbourne, despite "a shaky start" and while profitable, profits were spent on covering losses incurred from previous tours. She would pay herself a salary of no more than £10 during her Brisbane tour and even less when in Melbourne. At the time of the inquiry into her bankruptcy, she was not working but was hopeful of reopening shortly thereafter. She was not given discharge from her bankruptcy until November 1951.

=== Semi-retirement and later career ===
Bramley retired from working on the stage full-time in 1934, but continued theatre work for many years thereafter. She visited Christchurch, New Zealand during mid-1935 where she presented Beware of Widows at St James Theatre and was described as "the queen of comedy". In September 1935, a benefit performance was held in her honour in Auckland following her company closing its season abruptly, yet she chose to stay rather than sailing back to Australia. In 1941, she returned to Brisbane after an 11-year period of absence, to perform at the Comedy Theatre which was given an ovation by audience members.

At one time, she was managed by George Cross, who at one time was a leading actor on Australian stage. Her last professional appearance on stage was around 1943, although she was known to take minor roles in small shows occasionally, such as "A Kiss for Cinderella" in 1947, where she played a queen.

== Later life ==
In her later life, she lived with and was cared for by her sister Margarite Adele Allditt in a new-build house, described as a cross between a mansion and a fun fair and in view of Port Jackson. Her house was devoid of any memorabilia from her days working in theatre and contained many 15th century Chinese items of furniture. She returned to Melbourne in August 1974 for the reopening of The Palace Theatre, which had shortly before been saved from demolition.

She died in June 1982.

== Personal life ==
She had a brother, Phil Bramley, and a sister, Margarite Adele Allditt. In 1914, she was married to stage manager William Russell, but they separated some time around 1929.
