= Nothing but the Truth (1929 film) =

1929 film by Victor Schertzinger

Nothing But the Truth
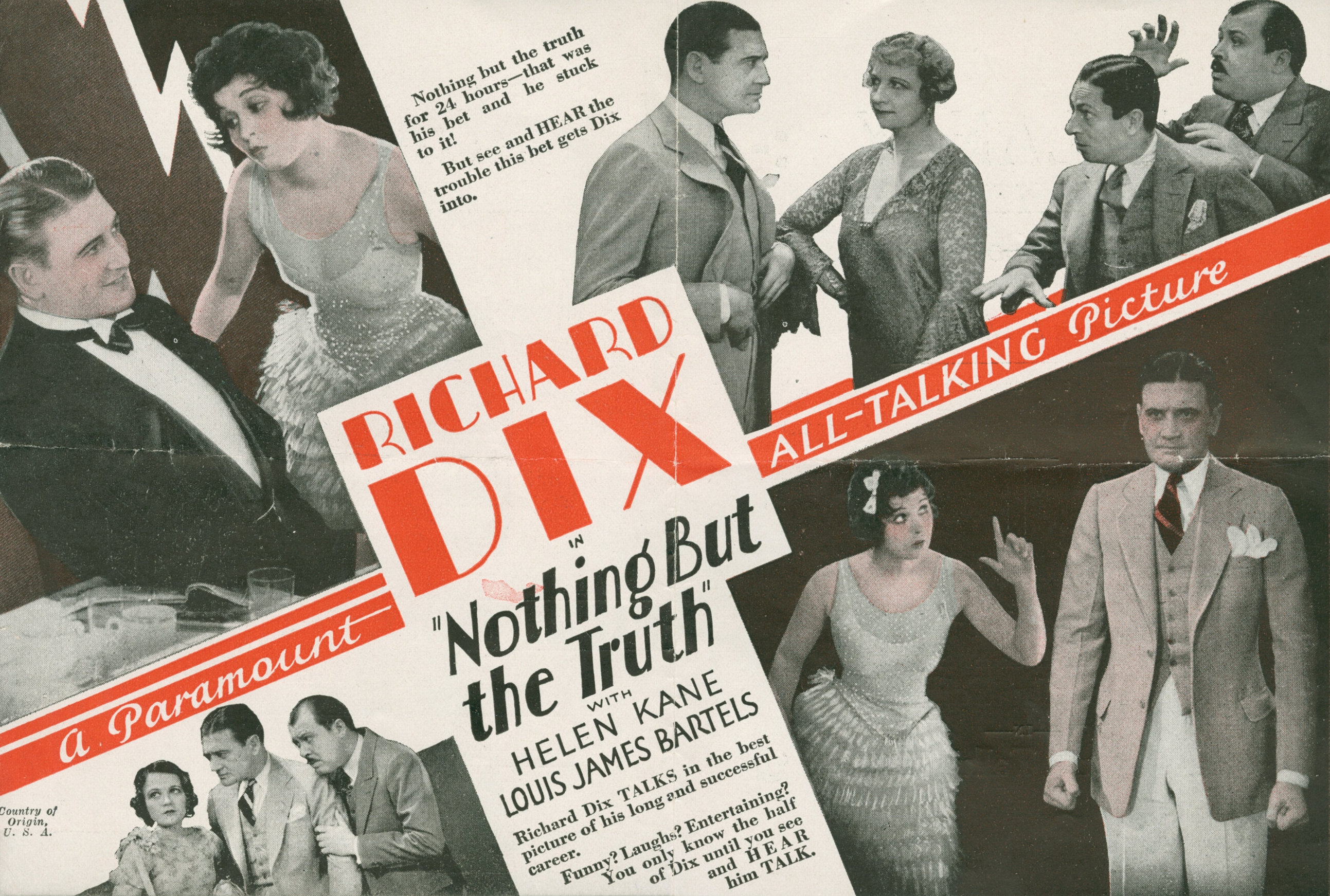
- A 1929 ad for the film
- Directed by: Victor Schertzinger
- Written by: John McGowan
- Based on: Nothing But the Truth; 1914 novel by Frederic S. Isham; 1916 play by James Montgomery
- Produced by: James Montgomery; J. G. Bachmann
- Starring: Richard Dix; Berton Churchill; Ned Sparks; Wynne Gibson; Helen Kane
- Cinematography: Edward Cronjager
- Edited by: Morton Blumenstock; Robert Bassler
- Distributed by: Paramount Pictures
- Release date: April 20, 1929
- Running time: 78 minutes
- Country: United States
- Language: English

Nothing But the Truth is a 1929 American pre-Code sound comedy film starring Richard Dix, loosely adapted from the play by James Montgomery and the 1914 novel of the same title by Frederic S. Isham. The play was adapted again (more faithfully) as Nothing But the Truth (1941) starring Bob Hope and Paulette Goddard.

Separate French, German and Spanish versions were made at the Joinville Studios in Paris as part of Paramount's policy of multiple-language versions.

== Plot ==
A near complete copy of the film.

Robert Bennett (Richard Dix) is a stockbroker who is very carefree with other people's money. Encouraging clients to buy stocks in companies that are failing is all in a day's work to him. His fiancée Gwenn Burke (Dorothy Hall) has to raise $40,000 for a charity project, comes to him with $10,000 to invest from her charity group, and wants him to double it within five days.

Meanwhile, E. M. Burke (Berton Churchill), Frank Connelly (Louis John Bartels), and Clarence Van Dyke (Ned Sparks) bet Bennett they will pay him each $10,000 if he tells the truth for 24 hours. The men later go to a nightclub where they meet Sabel and Mabel Jackson (Wynne Gibson and Helen Kane), who are a gold-digging sister act.

Mabel Jackson sings Do Something. After the show, the sisters ask Mr. Burke to back their show for them. They are determined to hold Burke to his promise to finance their idea for a show and won't take no for an answer. They hold all the cards, as they have managed to enter Burke's home and refuse to leave without the cash. Mrs. Burke (Madeline Grey) learns from Robert that her husband had promised to back the sisters' show, which makes her furious. Robert continues to answer every question truthfully; his fiancée Dorothy asks him if he loves her and what he has done with all the money, he tells her the answer without telling a lie. By 4pm, Robert has won the $40,000 by telling the truth.

== Cast ==
- Richard Dix as Robert Bennett
- Berton Churchill as E. M. Burke
- Louis John Bartels as Frank Connelly
- Ned Sparks as Clarence van Dyke
- Wynne Gibson as Sabel Jackson
- Helen Kane as Mabel Jackson
- Dorothy Hall as Gwenn Burke
- Madeline Grey as Mrs. E. M. Burke
- Nancy Ryan as Ethel Clark
- William Crane as Drunk
- Preston Foster as Nightclub Patron

== Production credits ==
The production credits on the film were as follows:

- Victor Schertzinger - director
- Monta Bell - producer
- James Montgomery - stage play
- John McGowan - adaptation
- Edward Cronjager - photography
- William Collier Sr.
- Ernst Fegté (uncredited)

== See also ==
- "Do Something" (1929 song)
- Nothing But the Truth (1941 film)
- List of early sound feature films (1926–1929)
