= Three Live Ghosts (play) =

1920s play by Frederic S. Isham

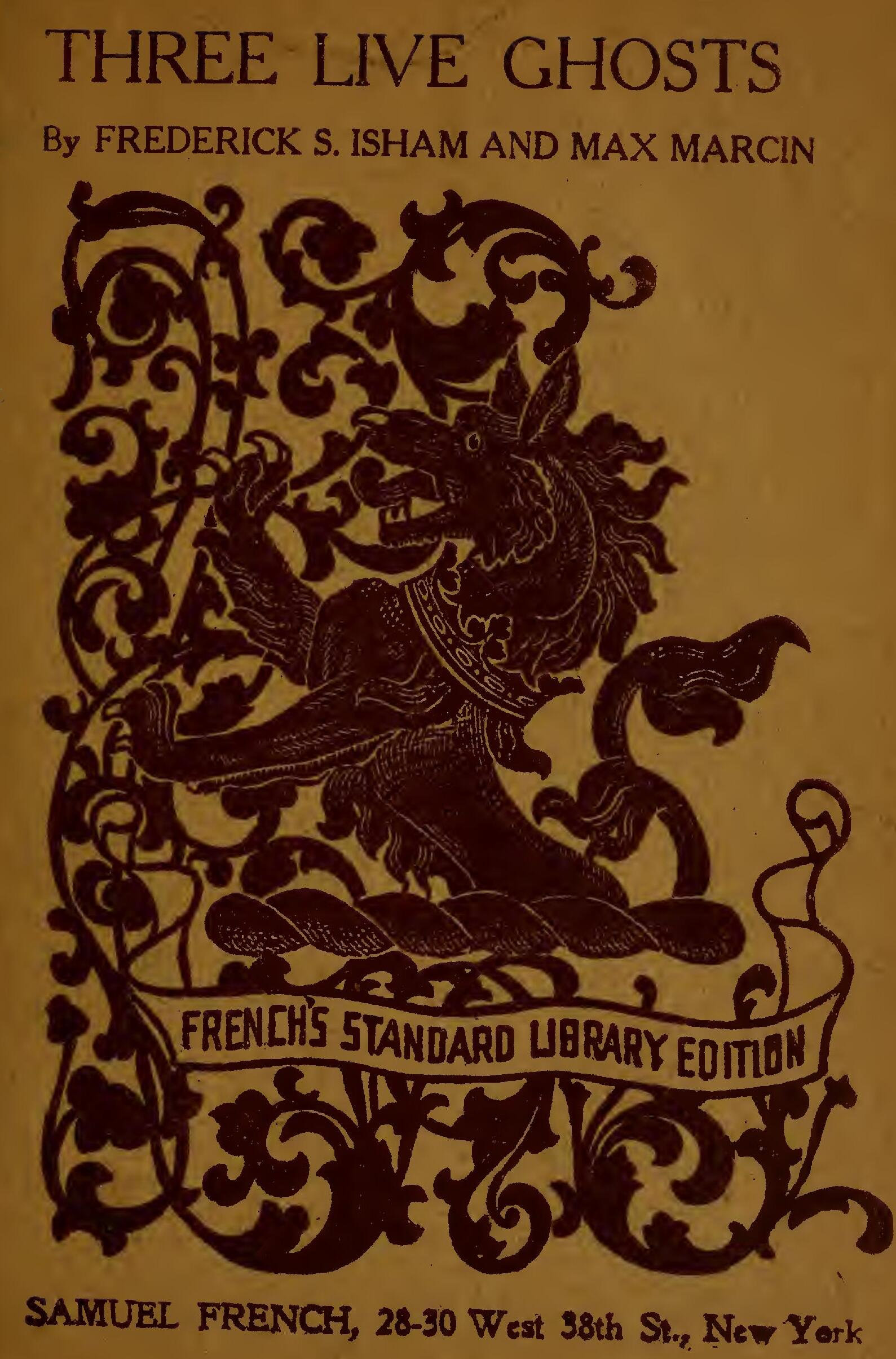
Title page of the play from a 1922 edition

Three Live Ghosts is a 1920 play based on the novel of the same name by Frederic S. Isham. The story follows three soldiers who return from World War I, despite being declared dead. Two of them are English, with one suffering from memory loss due to shell shock and the other finding out that his life insurance policy has been collected by his mother. The third soldier is an American with personal reasons for wanting to remain presumed dead. The trio must navigate the challenges of maintaining their false situations while dealing with various complications.

The play premiered at the Greenwich Village Theatre in New York, gaining significant attention and drawing packed audiences. It later moved to Broadway theatres, including the Nora Bayes Theatre where it was described as being a "big hit" and enjoyed a successful season. The play also had runs at the Globe Theatre in New Jersey in 1920, presented by Max Marcin and at the Mauch Chunk Opera House in 1921.

== Reception ==
The play was described as being unusual by a writer for Delaware's The Morning News, remarking that it had "all the ear marks of a whizzing comedy success".
