= The Social Buccaneer (1923 film) =

1923 film

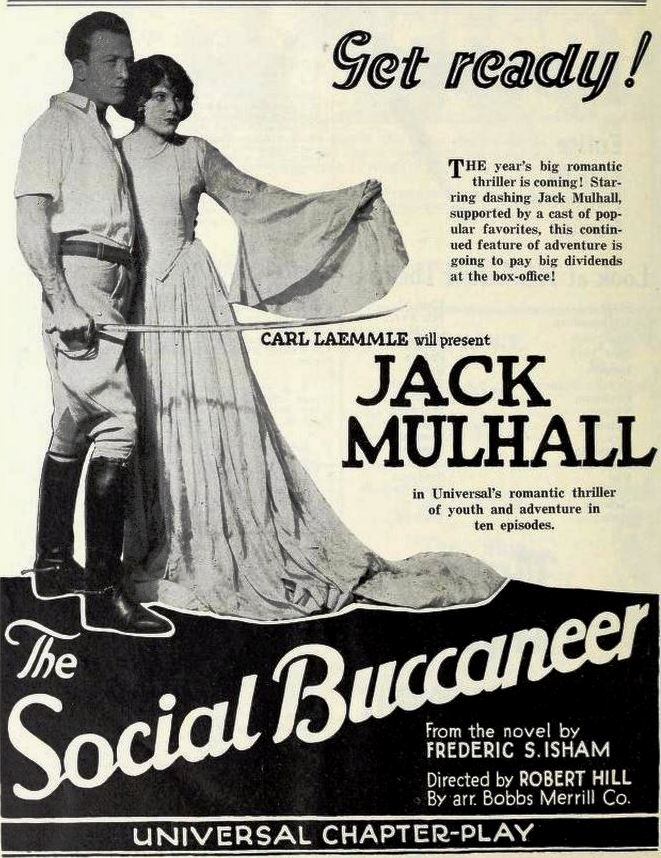
- November 1922 Universal Weekly advertisement for The Social Buccaneer
- Directed by: Robert F. Hill
- Written by: Anthony Coldeway (scenario); Burdette Brown (scenario)
- Based on: The Social Buccaneer by Frederic S. Isham
- Starring: Jack Mulhall; Margaret Livingston
- Distributed by: Universal Pictures
- Release date: January 8, 1923
- Running time: 10 episodes
- Country: United States
- Language: Silent (English intertitles)

The Social Buccaneer is a 1923 American film serial directed by Robert F. Hill. The serial consisted of ten episodes and was based on the novel of the same name by Frederic S. Isham. The Social Buccaneer is now considered to be a lost film.

== Cast ==
- Jack Mulhall as Jack Norton
- Margaret Livingston as Princess Elise
- William Welsh as Raymond Norton
- Harry De Vere as Harvey Vail
- Wade Boteler as Madison Ames
- Percy Challenger as Steele
- Lucille Ricksen as Lucille Vail
- Robert Anderson as Terry Malone
- Buck Connors as Phillip Dupre (as George Connors)
- Tom London as Louis Lenoir (as Leonard Clapham)
- Sidney Bracey as Bentley Craven
- Tote Du Crow
- Fontaine La Rue
- Scott Pembroke as Undetermined Role (unconfirmed)

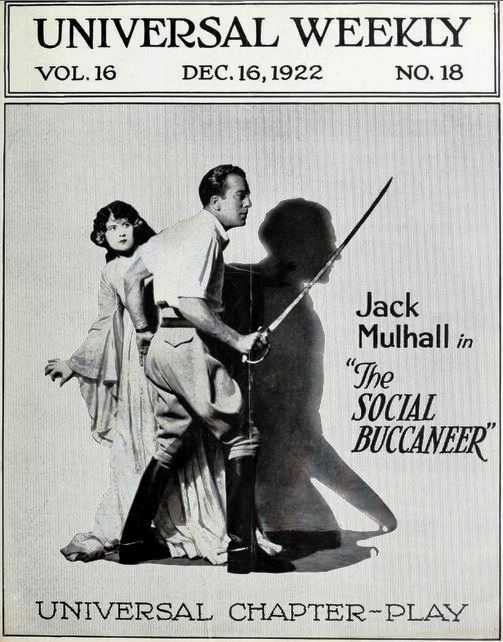
Universal Weekly advertisement for The Social Buccaneer

== Episodes ==
1. Missing Millions
2. Secret Ally
3. Tell-Tale Coin
4. Spider's Web
5. Black Shadows
6. Into the Depths
7. A Kingdom at Stake
8. Treason
9. The Coronation
10. Justice Triumphant

== See also ==
- List of film serials
- List of film serials by studio
- List of lost films
