= Nothing but the Truth (1941 film) =

1941 film by Elliott Nugent

- Theatrical release poster
- Directed by: Elliott Nugent
- Written by: Ken Englund; Don Hartman
- Based on: Nothing But the Truth; 1914 novel by Frederic S. Isham; 1916 play by James Montgomery
- Produced by: Arthur Hornblow, Jr.
- Starring: Bob Hope; Paulette Goddard; Edward Arnold
- Cinematography: Charles Lang
- Edited by: Alma Macrorie
- Music by: Floyd Morgan; Leo Shuken; Victor Young
- Production company: Paramount Pictures
- Distributed by: Paramount Pictures
- Release date: October 10, 1941
- Running time: 90 minutes
- Country: United States
- Language: English

Nothing but the Truth is a 1941 American comedy film directed by Elliott Nugent and starring Bob Hope, Paulette Goddard and Edward Arnold. It was produced and distributed by Paramount Pictures. It was Hope and Goddard's third movie together in three years.

The premise of the film, that the protagonist must tell the truth for the next 24 hours, is based on a play of the same name written by James Montgomery, itself loosely adapted from the 1914 novel Nothing But the Truth by Frederic S. Isham. The book and play had previously formed the basis of a 1929 movie, also called Nothing But the Truth, starring Richard Dix and Wynne Gibson. The 1941 film follows the plot of the play much more closely than the 1929 version. The same premise was used for a 1997 Jim Carrey movie, Liar Liar.

Elliott Nugent called it "a pleasant assignment."

== Plot ==
Steve Bennett is a stockbroker in Miami, Florida who has just accepted a position working for a man named T.T. Ralston. He is persuaded by Ralston's beautiful niece, Gwen Saunders, to invest a sum of $10,000 that she needs doubled in three days. Ralston has promised Gwen that if she raises $20,000 he will double it, but has been working behind her back to prevent her from raising the initial funds.

When Steve objects to Ralston's practice of pushing bad stocks onto his clients, he claims that he could get by just as well by telling the truth as by lying. Ralston and his partner Dick Donnelly, along with client Tom van Dusen (Gwen's boyfriend), bet Steve that he can't be completely honest for twenty-four hours straight. Steve bets the $10,000 he got from Gwen. One of the conditions is that no one can reveal the bet to an outsider and it can't be cancelled.

Steve is meticulously watched by the three men during the next twenty-four hours. They are entertaining guests and clients on Ralston's yacht during much of this time, and when Steve is honest with everyone he meets, he manages to insult several of them. In the late evening, an exotic dancer named Linda Graham enters the yacht, looking for Dick, who has promised her backing for her show. Linda meets and talks to Steve, telling him about the show. Mrs. Ralston and another distinguished woman overhear the conversation and mistakenly believes Linda is Steve's wife.

During the night, the partners steal Steve's clothes to prevent him from leaving the ship, but he borrows a dress from Linda. In disguise, Steve sneaks into Gwen's room at her invitation. He tells her that he isn't married to Linda and that he is in love with her.

The next day Steve gets heat from every direction. Gwen finds out that he has been in Linda's room during the night, the ladies sees him as indecent, and Tom because he is in love with Gwen and jealous. On top of this Linda is telling everyone that she is indeed married to Steve and that they have a child together, being in cahoots with Dick to make things harder for Steve.

Close to when the twenty-four hours are up, a man named Mr. Bishop enters the ship. He is the head of the charity organization to which Gwen intended to give the $40,000. Mr. Bishop asks to see the money, and Gwen, who has learned about the bet, tries to keep the man occupied, buying some extra time to help Steve win the bet.

The clocks on the boat have been put forward by the partners, and when they strike four Steve is able to lie to Mr. Bishop about the money. The partners celebrate since they have won the bet, but it turns out Steve's valet had reset the clocks when he noticed they were wrong. Thus, Steve wins the bet and has managed to double Gwen's money after all. He tells everyone on the yacht that he had made a bet that he would lie for the past twenty-four hours, and his honor is restored. Gwen takes a liking to him and awards him a kiss.

== Cast ==
- Bob Hope as Steve Bennett
- Paulette Goddard as Gwen Saunders
- Edward Arnold as T.T. Ralston
- Leif Erickson as Van
- Helen Vinson as Linda Graham
- Willie Best as Samuel
- Glenn Anders as Dick Donnelly
- Grant Mitchell as Mr. Bishop
- Catherine Doucet as Mrs. Van Dusen
- Rose Hobart as Mrs. Donnelly
- Clarence Kolb as Mr. Van Dusen
- Mary Forbes as Mrs. Ralston
- Leon Belasco as Dr. Zarak
- Helene Millard as Miss Turner

== Radio adaptation ==
Nothing but the Truth was presented on Old Gold Comedy Theatre January 14, 1945. The adaptation starred Anne Baxter and Alan Young.

== Bibliography ==
- Fetrow, Alan G. Feature Films, 1940-1949: a United States Filmography. McFarland, 1994.
- Goble, Alan. The Complete Index to Literary Sources in Film. Walter de Gruyter, 1999.
- Zoglin, Richard. Hope: Entertainer of the Century. Simon and Schuster, 2014.
