= Cheating Cheaters (play) =

Play by Max Marcin

- Written by: Max Marcin
- Original language: English

Premiere
- Date premiered: August 9, 1916
- Place premiered: Eltinge Theatre

Cheating Cheaters is a 1916 play written by Max Marcin. Producer A. H. Woods staged it on Broadway. The play is a melodramatic farce about two groups of jewel thieves who are each posing as a wealthy family in order to rob the other.

== Plot ==
Nan Carey becomes a member of a group of jewel thieves who pretend they are the wealthy Brockton family in order to gain the confidence of real high society families. While traveling, Nan (using the name Ruth Brockton) attracts the romantic attention of Tom Palmer, who turns out to be one of the Brocktons' neighbors. While attending a tea party thrown by the Palmers, the Brockton gang tricks the Palmers into inviting Nan to stay with them while the rest of the Brocktons are supposedly visiting Chicago. The Brocktons expect this ruse will allow them to steal the Palmers' jewelry. It is then revealed to the audience that the "Palmer family" is another group of thieves, who are planning to steal the Brocktons' jewelry while the Brocktons are out of town.

Thinking the Brocktons have left, the Palmer gang slips into the Brockton mansion, but are captured by the Brocktons. Meanwhile, Nan has gone to the Palmer mansion to burglarize it. Upon her return, the two groups each realize the other is a criminal gang, and they decide to join forces. Their planning is interrupted by detectives from the Ferris Detective Agency, who capture the combined gangs on behalf of the insurance companies for their past victims. Nan is revealed to be Ruth Ferris, head of the agency, who has been working undercover posing as a thief. Because her love for Tom is real and not just part of her cover, she offers him the opportunity to confess and join her agency rather than be turned over to the police.

== Productions ==
The play appeared in a preview production at the Savoy Theater in Asbury Park, New Jersey in June 1916. It debuted on Broadway on August 9, 1916, at the Eltinge 42nd Street Theatre, where it ran for over eight months with 286 performances. The production closed on April 14, 1917. After the Broadway run it went to London's West End, opening at the Strand Theatre in February 1918 with Shirley Kellogg playing Nan.

== Cast and characters ==
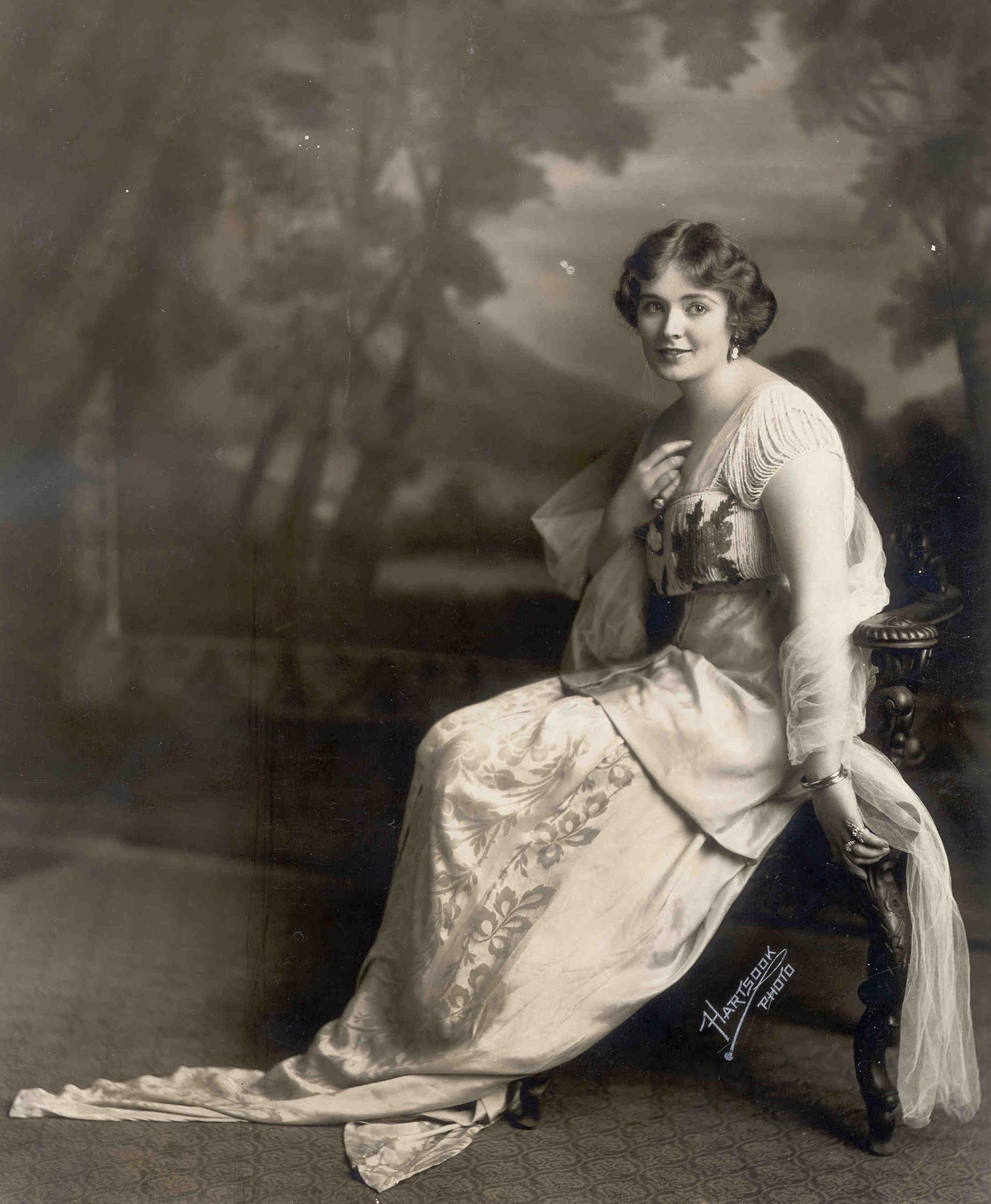
Marjorie Rambeau starred in the Broadway production.

The characters and cast from the Broadway production are given below:

Cast of the Broadway production
Character	Broadway cast
Steve Wilson	Robert McWade
Antonio Verdi	Edouard Durand
George Brockton	William Morris
Nell Brockton	Anne Sutherland
Nan Carey/Ruth Brockton	Marjorie Rambeau
Ira Lazarre	Frank Monroe
Mrs. Palmer	Winifred Harris
Grace Palmer	Gypsy O'Brien
Tom Palmer	Cyril Keightley
Edward Palmer	Arthur Barry
Phil Preston	William J. Phinney
Myron T. Hanley	Fletcher Harvey
Holmes	William Riley Hatch

== Reception ==
The New York Times gave a positive review, saying it was "an interesting play that is entertaining all the way through". The review in The Brooklyn Daily Eagle was also positive, calling the play "ingenious, clever and surprising". In The Theatre, Arthur Hornblow praised the play as "delightful entertainment".

In The Evening World, reviewer Charles Darnton called the Eltinge Theatre the "temple of crook-drama" with Woods as its high priest. He said Marcin had written a well-executed version of a common story, but it was entertainment "of the moment" that served only to pass an evening.

== Adaptations ==
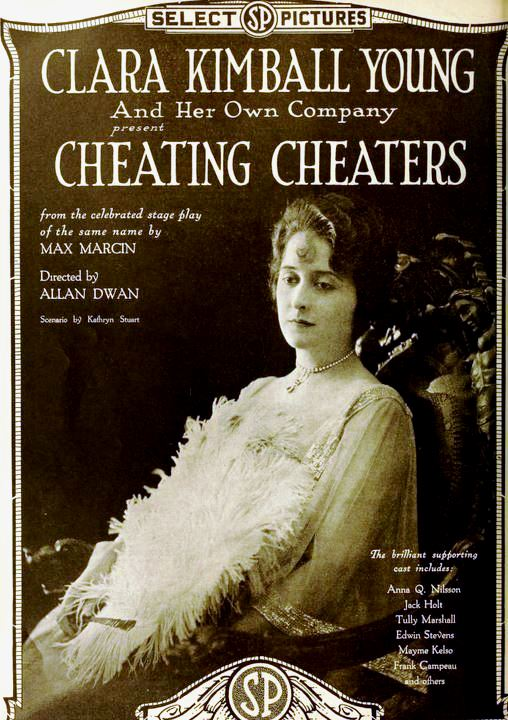
Clara Kimball Young starred in the 1919 movie adaptation of the play.

In 1919, actress Clara Kimball Young produced a silent film based on the play, retaining the title Cheating Cheaters. She also co-starred with Jack Holt. Allan Dwan directed. This version is now considered a lost film.

A second silent film adaptation, also titled Cheating Cheaters, was released by Universal Pictures in 1927. It starred Betty Compson and Kenneth Harlan. Edward Laemmle directed.

Universal released a sound film adaptation in 1934, starring Fay Wray and Cesar Romero. It again kept the title Cheating Cheaters. Richard Thorpe directed.

On August 31, 1936, the Lux Radio Theatre presented a radio adaptation, starring June Lang and George Raft.
