= Maxim Lando =

American pianist

Maxim Lando (born October 5, 2002, in Manhasset, New York) is an American pianist.

Lando grew up in Great Neck on Long Island, New York. His parents, pianist Pippa Borisy and clarinetist Vadim Lando, run the Great Neck Music Conservatory there. He began playing the piano when he was three years old. At the age of ten, Lando began studying piano with Hung-Kuan Chen, first at a preparatory class at the New England Conservatory in Boston and then at the Juilliard School's Pre-College in New York. Since the age of eleven, he has been sponsored by the Lang Lang Foundation, which has taken him on concert tours to Spain, Germany, Russia, and the United Kingdom.

In 2015, he became the first American to win first prize at the International Television Competition "The Nutcracker" for young musicians in Moscow. That same year, he placed second at the Kissingen Piano Olympics competition. In 2020, he was awarded the Gilmore Young Artist Award. In 2024, Lando was honored with the Audience Award at the International German Piano Award.

== Discography ==
- In 2022 Lando together with the violinist Tassilo Probst released his debut album Into Madness on Berlin Classics. The album contains sonatas for violin and piano of Béla Bartók, George Enescu and Joseph Achron. In 2023 the album won the award of the chamber music section at the International Classical Music Awards.
