= Three Live Ghosts (1929 film) =

1929 film by Thornton Freeland

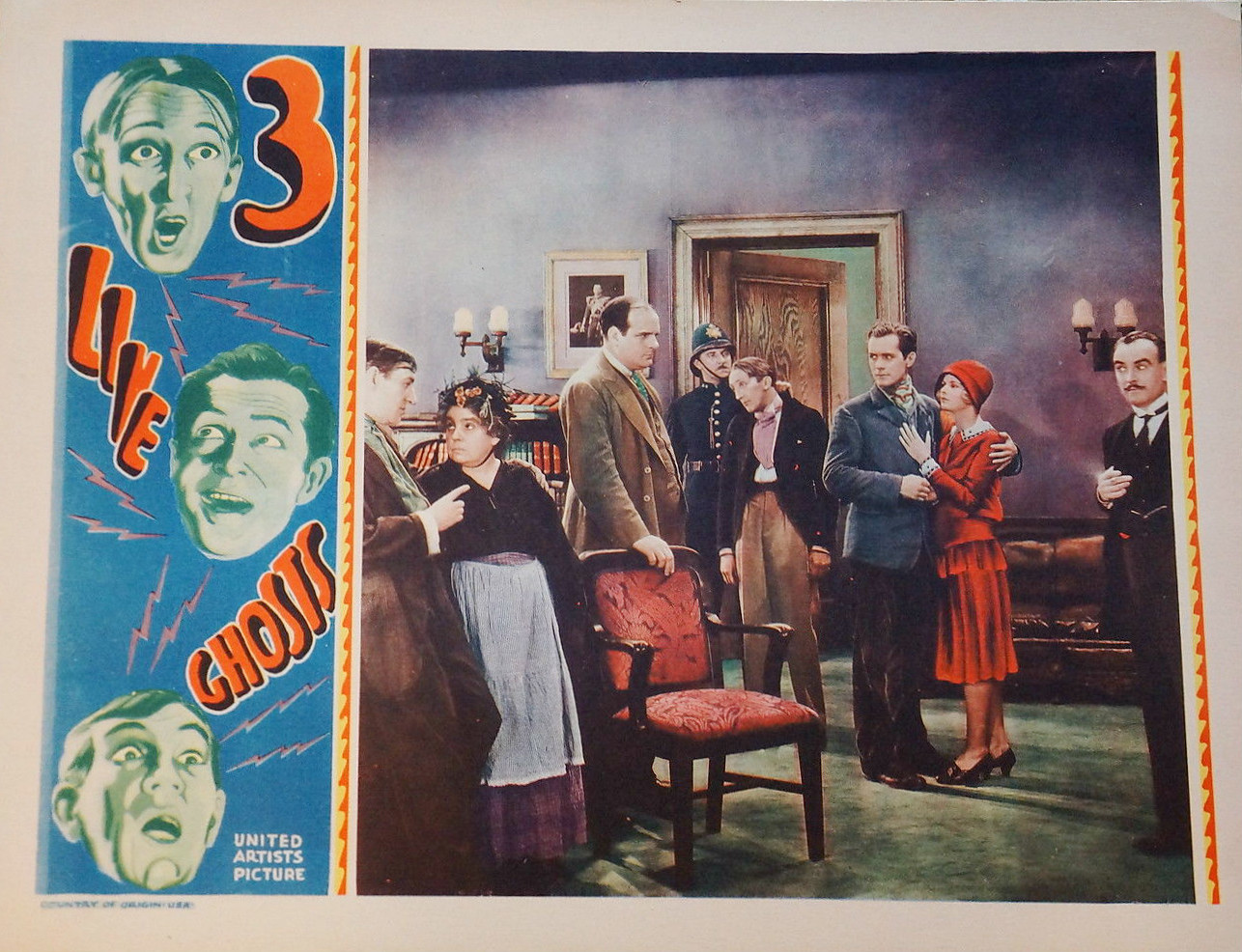
- Lobby card
- Directed by: Thornton Freeland
- Written by: Helen Hallett; Max Marcin
- Story by: Sally Winters
- Based on: Three Live Ghosts; 1920 play by Frederic S. Isham; Max Marcin
- Produced by: Max Marcin
- Starring: Beryl Mercer
- Cinematography: Robert H. Planck
- Edited by: Robert Kern
- Music by: Hugo Riesenfeld
- Production company: Feature Productions
- Distributed by: United Artists
- Release date: September 15, 1929
- Running time: 8 reels (7,486 feet)
- Country: United States
- Language: English

Three Live Ghosts is a 1929 American pre-Code comedy film directed by Thornton Freeland and starring Beryl Mercer, Harry Stubbs, and Joan Bennett; with Robert Montgomery, and Tenen Holtz. The screenplay concerns three veterans of World War I who return home to London after the armistice, only to find they have been mistakenly listed as dead. It was based on the 1920 play Three Live Ghosts by Frederic S. Isham.

Made in the early sound era when Hollywood savored any successful play and its dialogue, this film is a rendition of the Broadway play and also a remake of the 1922 Paramount silent, Three Live Ghosts. Mercer, McNaughton, and Allister would reprise their roles for a 1936 remake produced by Metro-Goldwyn-Mayer.

== Cast ==
- Beryl Mercer as Mrs. Gubbins
- Hilda Vaughn as Peggy Woofers
- Harry Stubbs as Bolton
- Joan Bennett as Rose Gordon
- Nanci Price as Alice
- Charles McNaughton as Jimmie Grubbins
- Robert Montgomery as William Foster
- Claud Allister as Spoofy
- Arthur Clayton as Paymaster
- Tenen Holtz as Crockery Man
- Shayle Gardner as Briggs
- Jack Cooper as Benson
- Jocelyn Lee as Lady Leicester

== See also ==
- List of early sound feature films (1926–1929)
