= Three Live Ghosts (1936 film) =

1936 film by H. Bruce Humberstone

- Directed by: H. Bruce Humberstone
- Screenplay by: C. Gardner Sullivan
- Based on: Three Live Ghosts; 1920 play by Frederic S. Isham; Max Marcin
- Produced by: John W. Considine Jr.
- Starring: Richard Arlen; Beryl Mercer; Claud Allister; Cecilia Parker
- Cinematography: James Wong Howe; Chester A. Lyons
- Edited by: Tom Held
- Music by: William Axt
- Production company: Metro-Goldwyn-Mayer
- Distributed by: Metro-Goldwyn-Mayer
- Release date: January 10, 1936
- Running time: 61 minutes
- Country: United States
- Language: English

Three Live Ghosts is a 1936 American comedy film directed by H. Bruce Humberstone and starring Richard Arlen, Claud Allister and Cecilia Parker.

The film was produced by Metro-Goldwyn-Mayer as a remake of the 1929 film of the same title, itself based on a 1920 play by Frederic S. Isham inspired by his own 1918 novel.

== Plot ==
Three soldiers of the British Army, including an American, are reported killed in action during the First World War. In fact they are being held as prisoners of war by the Germans. After the war they return to London, where they find they are considered officially dead. The stepmother of one has spent all the money she has received in compensation, another is an eccentric aristocratic-type who has lost his memory while the third is an American who has a private detective searching him out.

== Cast ==
- Richard Arlen as William 'Bill' Jones
- Beryl Mercer as Mrs. Gibbins
- Claud Allister as Lord 'Spoofy' Brockton
- Charles McNaughton as James 'Jimmie' Gubbins
- Cecilia Parker as Ann Gordon
- Dudley Digges as Inspector Briggs
- Nydia Westman as Peggy 'Peg' Woofers
- Jonathan Hale as Detective Bolton
- Lillian Kemble-Cooper as Lady Brockton
- Robert Greig as John Ferguson
- Wallis Clark as Detective Harris
- Anita Deniston as Tommy Brockton
- Joseph North as Parker
- Forrester Harvey as Paymaster
- Clare Verdera as Brockton's Maid
- Sidney Bracey as Book Merchant
- Frederik Vogeding as Officer of the Day
- Egon Brecher as German Officer
- Roland Varno as German Corporal
