= The Nut Cracker =

1920 novel

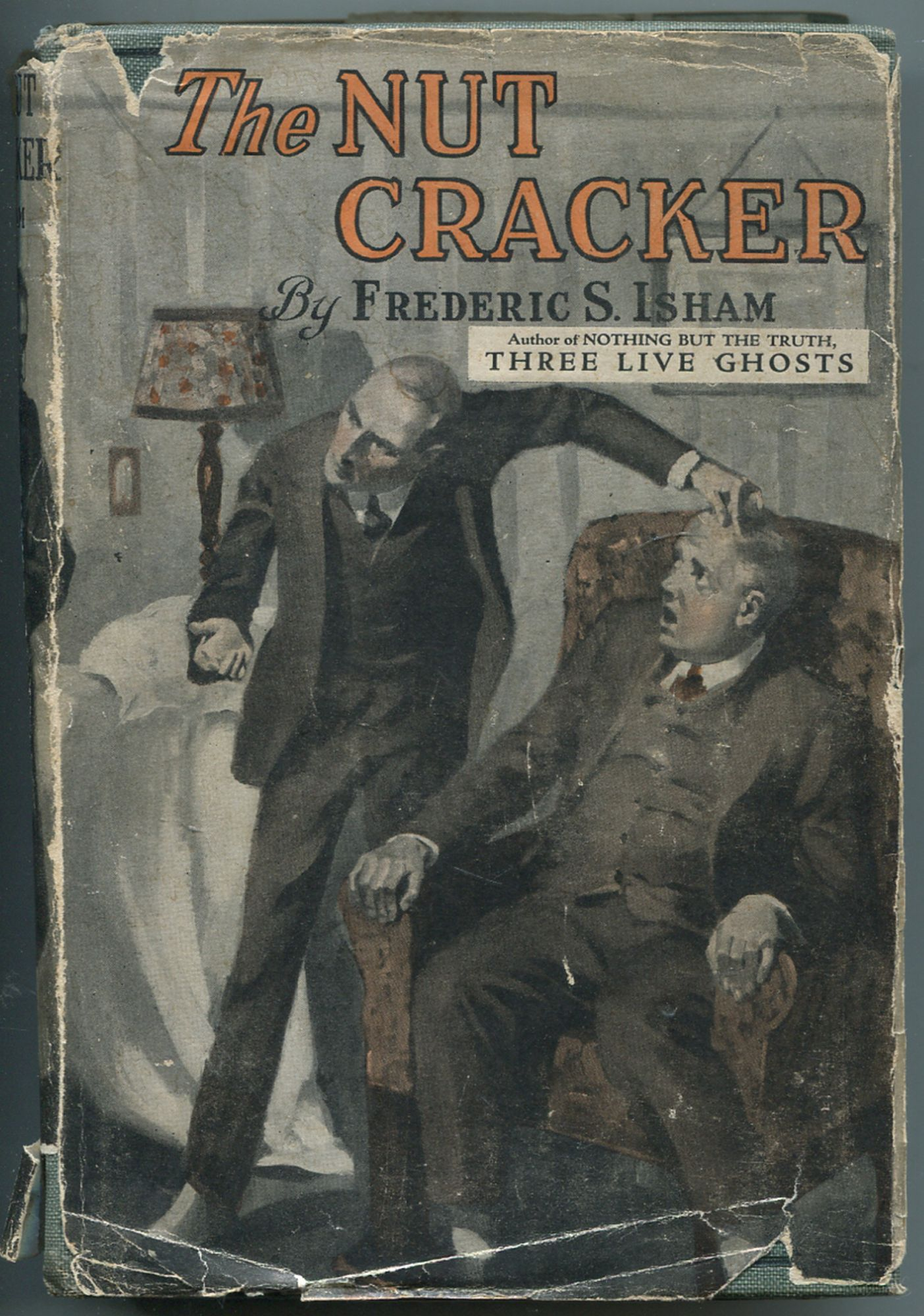
- Author: Frederic S. Isham
- Language: English
- Genre: Comedy
- Publisher: Bobbs-Merrill
- Publication date: 1920
- Publication place: United States
- Media type: Print
- Pages: 248

The Nut Cracker is a 1920 comedy novel by the American writer Frederic S. Isham. It was publisher by the Indianapolis-based Bobbs-Merrill Company. After an accident a man pretends to have lost his memory and enjoys a series of adventures.

== Adaptation ==
In 1926 it was made into a silent film The Nutcracker directed by Lloyd Ingraham and starring Edward Everett Horton, Mae Busch and Harry Myers.

== Bibliography ==
- Goble, Alan. The Complete Index to Literary Sources in Film. Walter de Gruyter, 1999.
- Smith, Geoffrey D. American Fiction, 1901-1925: A Bibliography. Cambridge University Press, 1997.
