= Do Something (1929 song) =

Song written for 1929 film Nothing But the Truth

Sheet music, 1929

"Do Something" is a song written by Sam H. Stept and Bud Green for the Paramount Pictures film Nothing But the Truth (1929), in which the song was performed by Helen Kane. The scene of Kane singing this song is missing from the only known extant print of the movie.

A performance from Syncopation (1929).

Kane also had a hit recording of the song for Victor Records, which she recorded in 1929. The sheet music, bearing Kane's photo, and phonograph record both state that the song is from Nothing But the Truth. The song was also used in the soundtrack of the film Syncopation (1929) where it was sung by Dorothy Lee and Morton Downey.

== Lyrics ==
The lyrics to the song are as follows:

Oh honey, oh honey!
Why is it that you act so funny?
When we should be making love?
Oh, I'm willing, I'm so willing,
But nothing that you do seems thrilling.
I long for your pettin';
Where am I gettin'?

There's the moon, way up high,
Here are you, here am I,
Oh, do, do, do something!

I ain't been hugged, and I ain't been kissed,
And I want to see just what I've missed.
So, oh do, oh do something!

I got the time and the place, and the place and the time, I know,
I got a bench and a park, and a park and a bench, and all!

You know, other pairs, they're making haste;
But, look at me, I'm just going to waste
So, oh do, oh do something!

Summer night, stars are low;
Oh, tell me, what are we waitin' for, huh?
Oh come on honey, oh come on, do something!
Boop-oop-a-doop!

You know, it's been told, and explained,
That nothing tried is nothing gained
Oh, do, do, do something!

I've got a kiss and a hug and a kiss or two
I want to give them away, and I'm gonna give them away to you!
Boop-boop-boop-a-doop!

Sittin' around just seems so dumb;
And, look at me, I'm just gettin numb
So, oh do, oh do something!

All alone, just we two,
And I feel so bup-bup-a-do!
So, oh do, do, do!
Bup-a-dup-a-dup-a-dup Boop-oop-a-doop!

== See also ==
- Boop-Oop-a-Doop
- Nothing But the Truth (1929 film)
- Syncopation (1929 film)
