= Three Live Ghosts (novel) =

191 novel

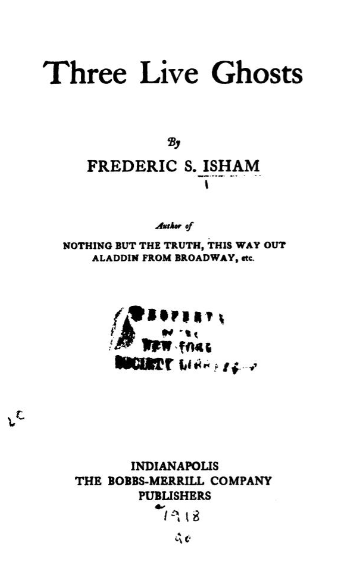
- Title page for Three Live Ghosts (1918)
- Author: Frederic S. Isham
- Language: English
- Genre: Comedy
- Publisher: Bobbs-Merrill
- Publication date: 1918
- Publication place: United States
- Media type: Print
- Pages: 250

Three Live Ghosts is a 1918 comic novel by American writer Frederic Isham. Set in London around Armistice Day, it follows three escaped Allied POWs who return home only to find they are officially listed as dead, prompting farcical complications in post-war society.

== Adaptations ==
=== Stage ===
A stage adaptation by Isham and Max Marcin opened at the Greenwich Village Theatre on 29 September 1920 and later transferred to Broadway, running into 1921.

=== Film ===
A British silent film, Three Live Ghosts (1922), directed by George Fitzmaurice with title cards designed by a young Alfred Hitchcock, was long thought lost until a Soviet-archive print surfaced and was publicly screened in 2015. Two U.S. screen versions followed: a 1929 talkie and a 1936 remake; trade papers and release lists document both.

== Plot ==
Three PoWs - an English aristocrat with shell-shock, a Cockney whose mother has claimed his insurance, and an American - return to London and, compelled to remain dead, entangle themselves in mistaken-identity scrapes before each is restored to his former life.
