= Thornton Freeland =

American film director (1898–1987)

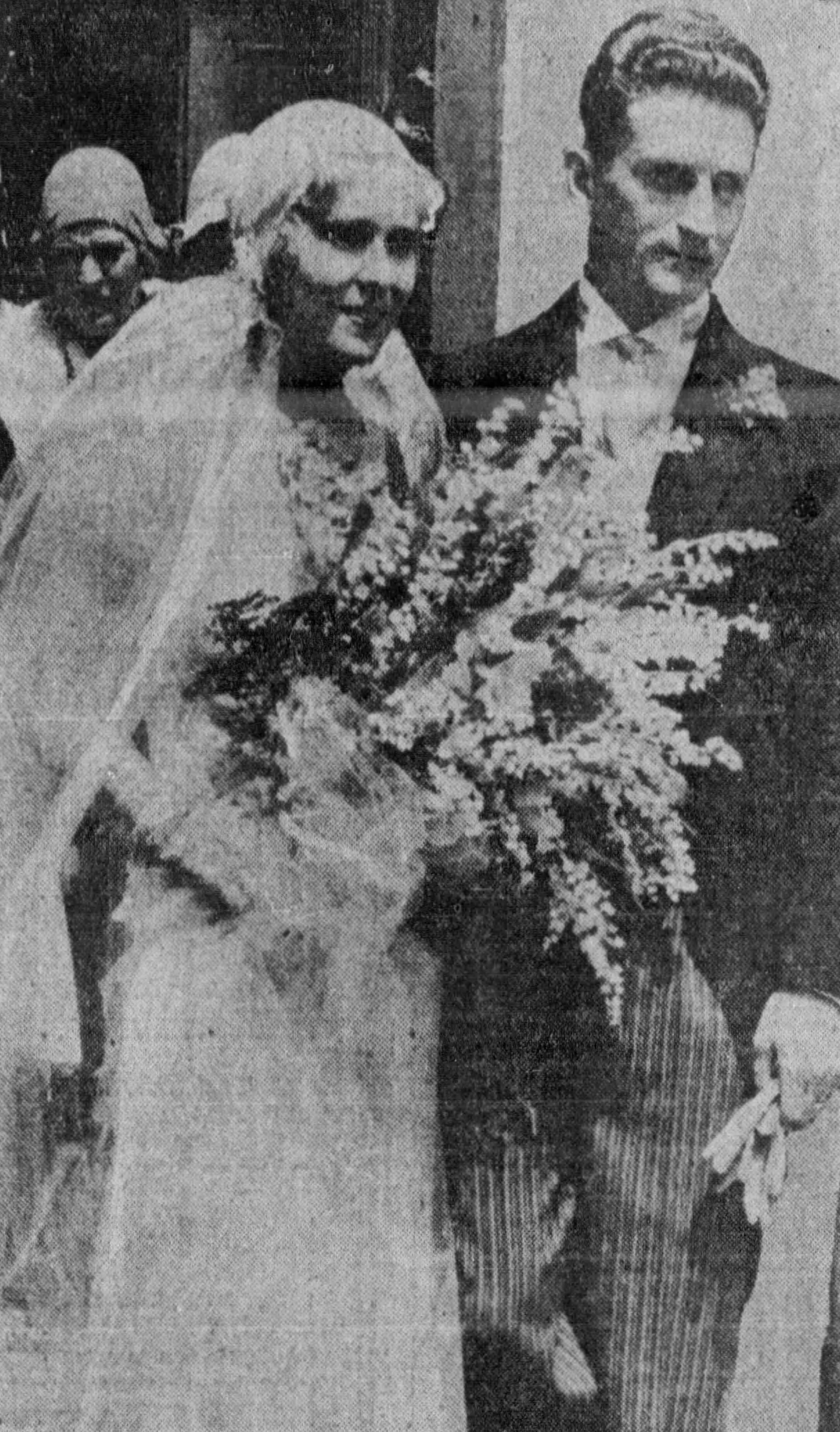
- Freeland and his wife June in 1930
- Born: February 10, 1898; Hope, North Dakota, U.S.
- Died: May 22, 1987 (aged 89); Fort Lauderdale, Florida, U.S.
- Occupation: Director
- Years active: 1924–1949 (film)
- Spouse: June Clyde

Thornton Freeland (February 10, 1898 – May 22, 1987) was an American film director who directed 26 British and American films in a career that lasted from 1924 to 1949.

== Early success ==
He was born in Hope, North Dakota in 1898 and originally worked as an assistant director during the silent era. In 1929 he directed his first film, the comedy Three Live Ghosts. He enjoyed an early success with the Eddie Cantor Technicolor musical Whoopie! (1930) and much of his subsequent work was in musicals and comedies.

In 1933, he directed Flying Down to Rio which launched the screen partnership of Fred Astaire and Ginger Rogers although it had originally been designed as a starring vehicle for the Mexican actress Dolores del Río. The following year Freeland made a film version of the long-running Broadway revue George White's Scandals.

== Britain ==
In 1935 Freeland went to London to make the musical comedy Brewster's Millions starring Jack Buchanan. He was to work in Britain for the remainder of the decade. In 1936 he made Accused at Isleworth Studios, which was produced by and starred his fellow American Douglas Fairbanks, Jr. who had also moved to Britain at the time. A Paris-set murder mystery, the film also featured Dolores Del Rio. He directed Fairbanks again in the costume drama The Amateur Gentleman the same year.

Britain was experiencing a major boom in filmmaking at the time, and many of Freeland's projects were made with an eye to the international market. However he also directed comedies with more local appeal such as Skylarks (1936) featuring Nervo and Knox and Hold My Hand (1938) with Stanley Lupino. During his time in England Freeland worked for a variety of companies, many of which were independents which had been established during the boom. Amongst these was Capitol Films for whom he made Jericho, a drama with Paul Robeson. By 1937 the boom was over and his final films in England were made by better-established studios such as London Films and Associated British. His last film to be released in the decade was a Jack Buchanan comedy-thriller The Gang's All Here.

== Later career ==
He returned to the United States during World War II, and made two films in Hollywood. In the late 1940s he returned to Britain to make a final three films. Following the release of the comedy Dear Mr. Prohack (1949) he retired from directing.

He was married to the American actress June Clyde. Like her husband Clyde spent much of the 1930s working in British films.

== Filmography ==
- Three Live Ghosts (1929)
- Whoopee! (1930)
- Be Yourself (1930)
- Six Cylinder Love (1931)
- The Secret Witness (1931)
- Love Affair (1932)
- They Call It Sin (1932)
- Working Wives (1932)
- The Unexpected Father (1932)
- Flying Down to Rio (1933)
- George White's Scandals (1934)
- Brewster's Millions (1935)
- Accused (1936)
- Skylarks (1936)
- The Amateur Gentleman (1936)
- Jericho (1937)
- Paradise for Two (1937)
- Hold My Hand (1938)
- Over the Moon (1939)
- So This Is London (1939)
- The Gang's All Here (1939)
- Marry the Boss's Daughter (1941)
- Too Many Blondes (1941)
- Meet Me at Dawn (1947)
- Brass Monkey (1948)
- Dear Mr. Prohack (1949)

== Bibliography ==
- Marshall, Michael. Top Hat & Tails: The Story of Jack Buchanan. Elm Tree Books, 1978.
- Robinson, Mark A. The World of Musicals: An Encyclopedia of Stage, Screen, and Song. ABC-CLIO, 2014.
