= Nothing But the Truth (Isham novel) =

1914 novel

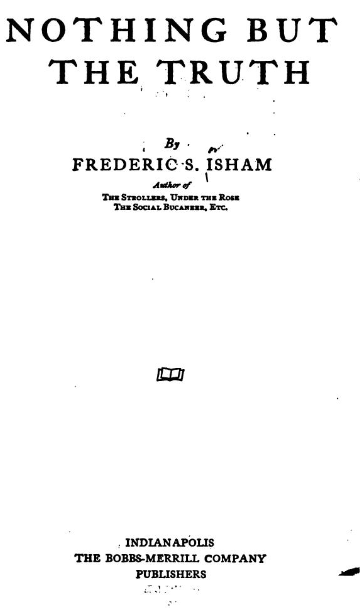
- Author: Frederic S. Isham
- Language: English
- Genre: Comedy
- Publisher: Bobbs-Merrill
- Publication date: 1914
- Publication place: United States
- Media type: Print
- Pages: 305

Nothing But the Truth is a 1914 comedy novel by the American writer Frederic S. Isham. It was adapted into a hit 1916 Broadway play of the same title.

== Film and stage adaptations ==
Playwright James Montgomery adapted Nothing But the Truth into a play which was a hit on Broadway in 1916. Montgomery's stage adaptation of the novel was the basis for multiple film adaptations; including the 1920 silent film Nothing But the Truth by Metro Pictures starring Taylor Holmes and Poppy Wyndham. The play was also the basis for the 1929 sound film Nothing But the Truth directed by Victor Schertzinger and starring Richard Dix and Wynne Gibson. Several alternative language versions were produced by Paramount Pictures at their Joinville Studios in Paris including The Naked Truth (German) and The Pure Truth (Spanish). In 1941 the film was remade, directed by Elliott Nugent and featuring Bob Hope and Paulette Goddard.

Montgomery also adapted his stage play into the 1926 musical Yes, Yes, Yvette.

== Bibliography ==
- Bordman, Gerald. American Theatre: A Chronicle of Comedy and Drama 1914-1930. Oxford University Press, 1995.
- Goble, Alan. The Complete Index to Literary Sources in Film. Walter de Gruyter, 1999.
- Smith, Geoffrey D. American Fiction, 1901-1925: A Bibliography. Cambridge University Press, 1997.
