= Cheating Cheaters (1934 film) =

1934 film by Richard Thorpe

- Theatrical release poster
- Directed by: Richard Thorpe
- Screenplay by: (play) Max Marcin; James Mulhauser; Allen Rivkin; Gladys Buchanan Unger
- Produced by: Stanley Bergerman
- Starring: Fay Wray; Cesar Romero; Minna Gombell; Henry Armetta; Francis L. Sullivan; Hugh O'Connell
- Cinematography: Norbert Brodine
- Edited by: Ray Curtiss
- Music by: Edward Ward
- Production company: Universal Pictures
- Distributed by: Universal Pictures
- Release date: November 5, 1934
- Running time: 70 minutes
- Country: United States
- Language: English

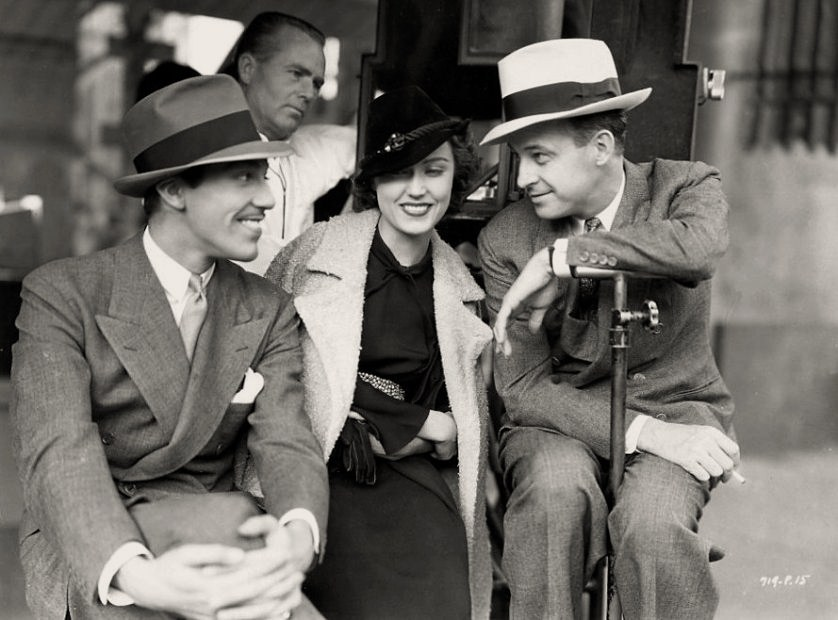
Cesar Romero, Fay Wray, director Richard Thorpe and cinematographer George Robinson (in background) on the set

Cheating Cheaters is a 1934 American comedy film directed by Richard Thorpe, written by James Mulhauser, Allen Rivkin and Gladys Buchanan Unger and starring Fay Wray and Cesar Romero, with a supporting cast featuring Minna Gombell, Henry Armetta, Francis L. Sullivan and Hugh O'Connell. The picture was released on November 5, 1934, by Universal Pictures.

== Plot ==
The Palmers, a gang of thieves posing as a wealthy family, move next door to the Lazarres with plans of robbing them. What the Palmers don't realize is that the Lazarres are also a gang of criminals planning to rob their new wealthy neighbors, the Palmers.

== Cast ==
- Fay Wray as Nan Brockton
- Cesar Romero as Tom Palmer
- Minna Gombell as Nell Brockton
- Henry Armetta as Prof. Tony Verdi
- Francis L. Sullivan as Dr. George Brockton
- Hugh O'Connell as Steve Wilson
- Wallis Clark as Mr. Palmer
- Ann Shoemaker as Mrs. Grace Palmer
- John T. Murray as Ira Lazarie
- George Barraud as Phil
- Morgan Wallace as Holmes
- Harold Huber as Edgar 'Legs' Finelli
