= Three Live Ghosts (1922 film) =

1922 film

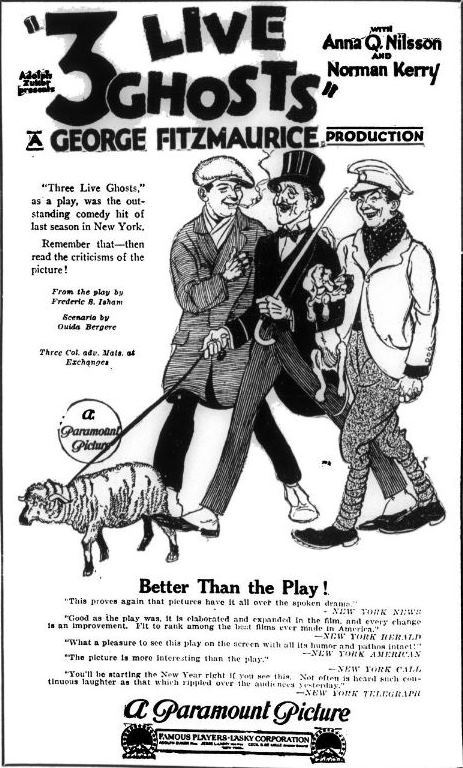
- Newspaper advertisement
- Directed by: George Fitzmaurice
- Written by: Ouida Bergère; Margaret Turnbull
- Based on: Three Live Ghosts; 1920 play by Frederic S. Isham; Max Marcin
- Produced by: Adolph Zukor
- Starring: Norman Kerry
- Cinematography: Arthur C. Miller
- Distributed by: Famous Players–Lasky British Producers
- Release date: 1 January 1922
- Running time: 60 minutes
- Country: United Kingdom
- Language: Silent (English intertitles)

Three Live Ghosts is a 1922 British comedy film directed by George Fitzmaurice. Alfred Hitchcock is credited as a title designer. The film is based on a 1920 Broadway play, Three Live Ghosts, by Frederic S. Isham and Max Marcin. Actor Cyril Chadwick is the only performer from the play to appear in the film. A copy of the film, thought to be lost, was found in a Russian archive and shown publicly in 2015. This version had however been radically re-edited by Soviet censors in the 1920s, making the film a searing critique of post-war Britain, including its relations with Ireland, which achieved Dominion status in the year the film was first shown.

== Plot ==
As described in a film magazine, three Allied soldiers escape from a World War I German prisoner-of-war camp and arrive as stowaways in London on Armistice Day. Of the three returning soldiers, one is an English nobleman suffering loss of memory as a result of shell shock, the second is a Cockney who, because he was listed among the dead casualties and his mother took the insurance money, must remain "dead," and the third is an American who must remain "dead" due to troubles with the young woman he loves. Hence, the three live ghosts. The nobleman, given to fits of kleptomania, enters a mansion and attires himself in fine raiment and jewelry and then carries off a baby from a perambulator. Returning with a lamb gathered while crossing Hyde Park, the nobleman returns to the Whitechapel home of the Cockney where the three ghost soldiers have stopped. After a series of entanglements, there is a resolution of all issues. The English nobleman learns he has robbed his own home and taken his own child, the American and his sweetheart are reconciled and he is freed of a charge unjustly made against him, and the Cockney and his insurance matters are squared up.

== Cast ==
- Norman Kerry as Billy Foster
- Anna Q. Nilsson as Ivis
- Edmund Goulding as Jimmy Gubbins
- John Miltern as Peter Lame
- Cyril Chadwick as Spoofy
- Clare Greet as Mrs. Gubbins (as Claire Greet)
- Dorothy Fane as The Duchess
- Annette Benson as Mrs. Woofers
- Wyndham Guise as Briggs (as Windham Guise)

== See also ==
- List of rediscovered films
