= Max Marcin =

Polish screenwriter

- Born: Max Schlamjack; 5 May 1879; Krotoschen, Posen, Germany (now Poznań, Poland)
- Died: 30 March 1948 (aged 68); Tucson, Arizona, United States
- Occupation: Screenwriter
- Years active: 1916-1949

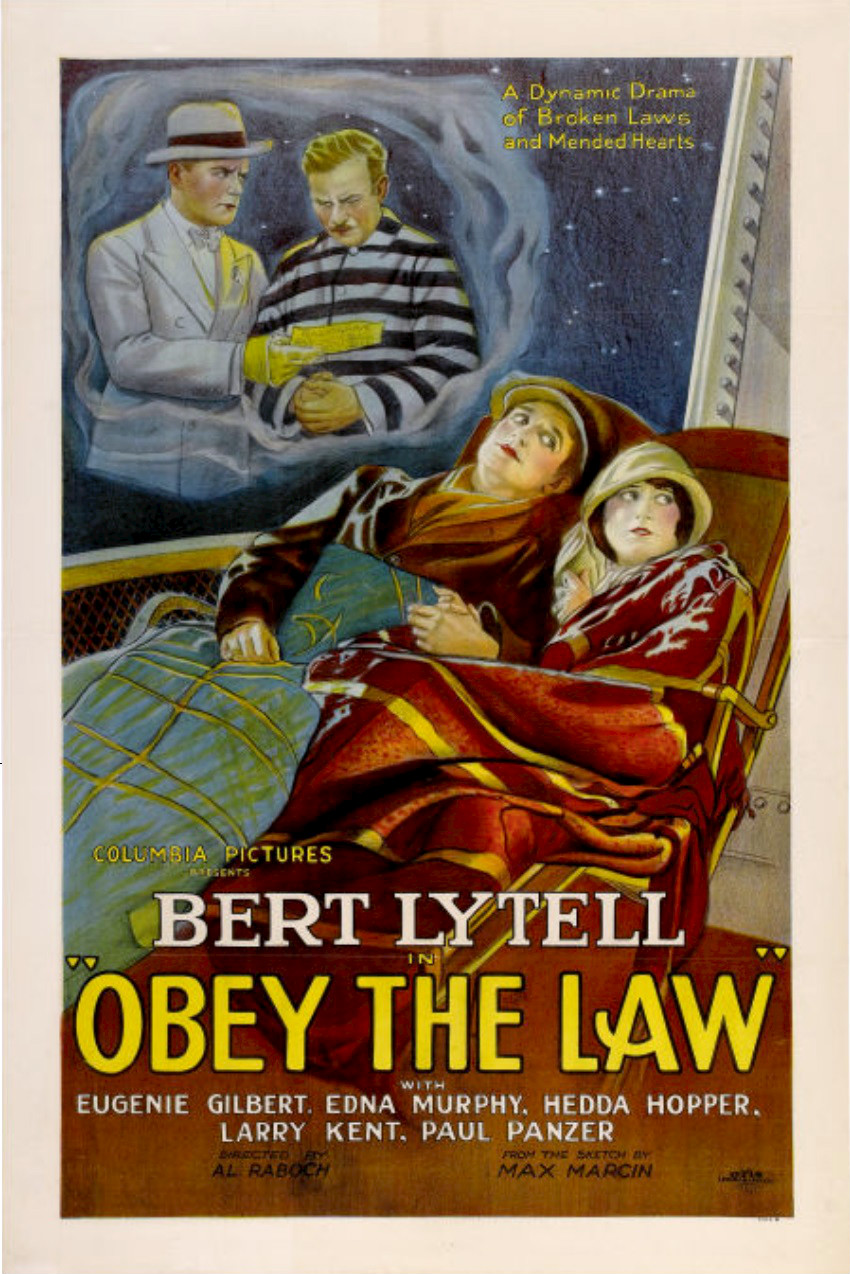
Poster for Obey the Law

Max Marcin (née Schlamjack; 5 May 1879 – 30 March 1948) was a Polish-born American playwright, novelist, screenwriter, and film director. He wrote for 47 films between 1916 and 1949. He also directed six films between 1931 and 1936. His stage work includes See My Lawyer (1915), directed by Frank M. Stammers; he wrote and/or produced almost 20 plays for Broadway from 1916 to 1938. Marcin wrote for and produced The FBI in Peace and War and created, produced and wrote for the Crime Doctor radio program, which became the basis for a series of ten Crime Doctor films.

== Biography ==
He was born in Krotoschen, Posen, Germany (now Poznań, Poland). At the age of seven, Max emigrated to the United States with his father and mother, Hirsch and Johanna Schlamjack, and two siblings, Julius and Emma. They were steerage passengers on the S/S Taormina, which sailed from the Port of Hamburg on 14 July 1886 and arrived at the Port of New York on 2 August 1886. They settled in New York City, where his father continued working as a butcher. Max Schlamjack was admitted to City College as a student in 1895. He began his career as a newspaper reporter in 1898 and, with the passing years, devoted himself to more creative literary work, primarily as a writer of plays and short stories. He died in Tucson, Arizona, aged 68. He was survived by a brother and a sister.

== Selected plays ==
- Are You My Wife? with Roy Atwell
- The House of Glass (1913)
- Money Mania farce (1913)
- See My Lawyer (1915)
- Cheating Cheaters (play) (1916) (adapted to film three times)
- Eyes of Youth (1917)
- Here Comes the Bride with Roy Atwell (1917)
- The Woman in Room 13 (1919)
- Three Live Ghosts (1920) (producer) based on the novel Three Live Ghosts by Frederic S. Isham
- The Nightcap (1922)
- Mary, Get Your Hair Cut (1922)
- Give and Take (1923) (producer only; written by Aaron Hoffman)
- Silence (1924)
- Badges (1924)
- Kidnapper (1927) co-writer: Samuel Shipman
- The Humbug (1929)

== Selected short stories ==
- "The Return of Esther" (New York Tribune, Sunday, 11 April 1909)
- "Call of the Schutzenfest" (The Buffalo Courier, Sunday, 5 May 1909)
- "Better Than Rube" (New York Tribune, November 1911)
- "The Spy" (New York Tribune, 1 September 1912)

== Novels ==
- Are You My Wife? (1910) (311 pp., illus.; New York: Moffat, Yard & Co.)
- The Substitute Prisoner (1911) (New York: Moffat, Yard & Co.)

== Partial filmography ==
- Here Comes the Bride (1919)
- Eyes of Youth (1919)
- Three Live Ghosts (1922)
- The Love of Sunya (1927), based on Marcin's play The Eyes of Youth
- Rough House Rosie (1927)
- The Ghost Talks (1929)
- Three Live Ghosts (1929)
- City Streets (1931)
- Gambling Ship (1933)
- The Love Captive (1934)
- The Jungle Princess (1936)
- Crime Doctor (1943)
- Just Before Dawn (1946)
