= James Montgomery (playwright) =

James H. Montgomery (April 27, 1878 – June 17, 1966) was an American playwright, screenwriter, theatre producer, and actor.

== Life and career ==
Born in Malden, Massachusetts, James Montgomery spent the first 12 years of his career working as an actor in Boston, San Francisco, and Brooklyn. He gave his only performances on Broadway in Winchell Smith's play The Fortune Hunter at the Gaiety Theatre. He first drew critical acclaim as a writer for authoring three comedies which were hits on Broadway: the plays Ready Money (1912; adapted into the 1914 film Ready Money) and Nothing But the Truth (1916, based on the novel of the same name), and the musical Going Up (1916, based on Montgomery's play The Aviator).

Montgomery is best remembered for the musical Irene which he produced on Broadway, and which used a musical book co-authored by Montgomery and Joseph Stein that was based on Montgomery's earlier play Irene O'Dare. The original 1919 production was a tremendous hit which broke the record for the longest running production on Broadway at that point in time. The musical was later revived on Broadway in 1923 and 1973. He also co-wrote the musical book for Yes, Yes, Yvette (1926) which was based on his play Nothing But the Truth.

In addition to writing for the stage, Montogomery worked as a screenwriter for Metro-Goldwyn-Mayer.

Montgomery died on June 17, 1966, in New York City.
