= Frederic S. Isham =

American novelist

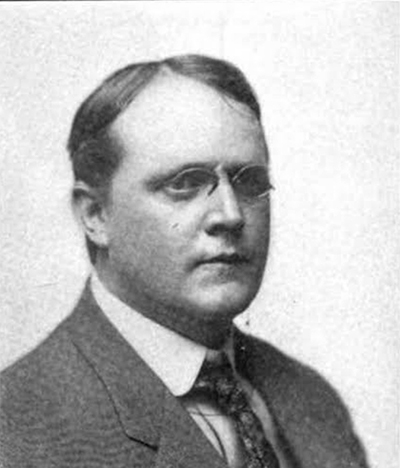
- Born: Frederic Stewart Isham; 29 March 1865; Detroit, Michigan
- Died: 6 September 1922 (aged 57)
- Occupation: Author
- Spouse: Helen Frue

Frederic Stewart Isham (March 29, 1865 – September 6, 1922) was an American novelist and playwright who wrote mainly historical romances and adventure novels.

== Life ==
Isham was born in Detroit, Michigan, the son of Charles Storrs Isham and Lucy B. (Mott) Isham. He studied at the Royal Academy of Music in London for two years. In 1895 he married Helen Margaret Frue. He died in New York.

== Career ==
Isham began as a playwright and later turned to novels, writing mainly historical romances and adventure novels set in various periods. Black Friday, for example, centers on the American financial crisis of 1869, while Under the Rose is set in 16th century Europe. His experiences in theater informed his first novel, The Strollers. Published by Bobbs-Merrill Company and its predecessor Bowen-Merrill Company, Isham's novels were illustrated by such artists as Harrison Fisher, William Thacher Van Dresser, Max J. Spero, and W. B. King. The critic H. L. Mencken wrote of his novel Half a Chance that it was "a brisk and entertaining story, with not too much reality in it," which well summarizes the general tenor of Isham's work.

Several of his novels have been turned into movies. With Max Marcin he turned his 1918 novel Three Live Ghosts into a 1920 comic play, and it was later made into a movie three times: a 1922 British comedy directed by George Fitzmaurice, a 1929 American comedy directed by Thornton Freeland, and a 1936 American film directed by H. Bruce Humberstone. Isham co-wrote the screenplay for the last of the three movies, which are about a trio of World War I soldiers who return home after the war only to discover that they are thought to be dead.

His 1914 novel Nothing But the Truth was made into a movie twice: as a loose adaptation in 1929 directed by Victor Schertzinger and more faithfully as a 1941 film directed by Elliott Nugent. The novel was also the basis for the 1926 musical Yes, Yes, Yvette.

The Social Buccaneer was a ten-episode 1923 American film serial based on Isham's novel and directed by Robert F. Hill. It is now thought to be a lost film.

== Books ==
Novels

- Aladdin from Broadway (1913)
- Black Friday (1904)
- Half a Chance (1909)
- The Lady of the Mount (1908)
- A Man and His Money (1912)
- Nothing But the Truth (1914)
- The Nut Cracker (1920)
- The Social Buccaneer (1910)
- The Strollers (1902)
- This Way Out (1917)
- The Thousand and Second Night: A Romantic Comedy (1911)
- Three Live Ghosts (1918)
- Under the Rose (1903)

Plays

- The Toy Shop: A Drama for Children (1891)
- Three Live Ghosts (1920, with Max Marcin)
