= East Is West =

East Is West may refer to:

- East Is West, a 1918 play by Samuel Shipman and John B. Hymer
- East Is West (1922 film), an American silent drama film
- East Is West (1930 film), an American pre-Code crime drama film
