= Friendly Enemies =

Friendly Enemies may refer to:

- Friendly Enemies (1942 film), an American drama film based on the play
- Friendly Enemies (1925 film), an American silent comedy thriller film based on the play
- Friendly Enemies (play), a play written by Aaron Hoffman and Samuel Shipman
