= The Woman in Room 13 (1932 film) =

1932 film

- Directed by: Henry King
- Screenplay by: Guy Bolton (screenplay); Max Marcin (play); Samuel Shipman (play); Percival Wilde (play)
- Based on: The Woman in Room 13
- Starring: Elissa Landi; Ralph Bellamy; Neil Hamilton; Myrna Loy; Gilbert Roland; Walter Walker
- Cinematography: John F. Seitz
- Edited by: Alfred DeGaetano
- Production company: Fox Film Corporation
- Distributed by: Fox Film Corporation
- Release date: May 15, 1932
- Running time: 67 minutes
- Country: United States
- Language: English

The Woman in Room 13 is a 1932 American pre-Code mystery film directed by Henry King and adapted by Guy Bolton from the play of the same name. The film stars Elissa Landi, Ralph Bellamy, Neil Hamilton, Myrna Loy, Gilbert Roland and Walter Walker. The film was released on May 15, 1932, by Fox Film Corporation.

== Plot ==
Laura Bruce is divorced from her husband following an unpleasant matrimonial term. She then marries Paul Ramsey, whom she has always loved. Dick Turner, his employer and enamored of Laura, sends her husband away on a business trip. A murder is committed and detective John Bruce seeks to fasten the crime upon Paul. After he fails to do so, a happy ending results.

== Cast ==
- Elissa Landi as Laura Ramsey
- Ralph Bellamy as John Bruce
- Neil Hamilton as Paul Ramsey
- Myrna Loy as Sari Loder
- Gilbert Roland as Victor Legrand
- Walter Walker as Howard Ramsey
- Luis Alberni as Peppi Tonelli
- Charley Grapewin as Andy

== Production ==
=== Development ===
The film is a remake of a 1920 silent film with Pauline Frederick.
