= The Woman in Room 13 (play) =

Play by Samuel Shipman and Max Marcin

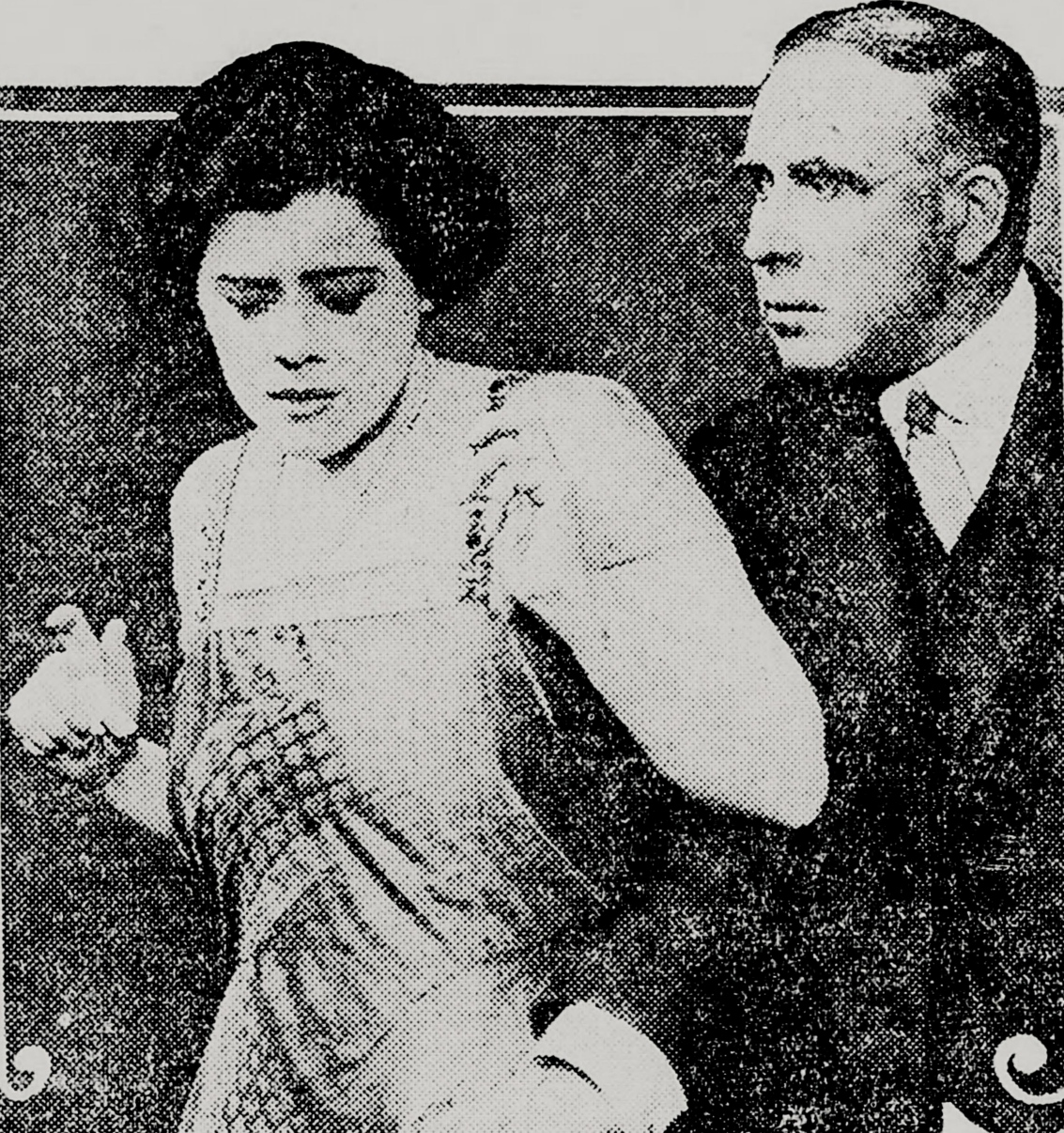
- Janet Beecher and DeWitt Jennings
- Original language: English
- Written by: Samuel Shipman, Max Marcin, and Percival Wilde
- Based on: The Target by Samuel Shipman
- Subject: Mistaken identity
- Genre: Melodrama

Premiere
- Date: January 14, 1919
- Place: Booth Theatre
- Directed by: W. H. Gilmore

The Woman in Room 13 is a 1918 play by Samuel Shipman and Max Marcin, with a prologue by Percival Wilde. It was a revised version of an earlier play by Samuel Shipman called The Target. A melodrama in four acts and a prologue, it had five settings and a large cast. The action of the play spans six years time. The story concerns the murder of a seducer by an outraged husband.

The play was produced by A. H. Woods and staged by W. H. Gilmore. The play starred Janet Beecher, Lowell Sherman, Gail Kane, and Charles Waldron. It had a one-night tryout in Providence, Rhode Island during late December 1918, before premiering on Broadway in January 1919, where it ran through June 1919 for 175 performances.

The play was adapted for a 1920 silent film, and a 1932 sound film.

== Characters ==
Characters are listed in order of appearance within their scope.

Lead

- Laura Bruce is a divorcee who remarries.
- Paul Ramsey is a bank auditor, and Laura's new husband.

Supporting

- John Bruce is Laura's ex-husband, who later becomes a private detective.
- Dick Turner is the head of a large bank, Paul Ramsey's boss, and serial seducer.
- Edna Crane is a previous victim of Dick Turner.
- Chief Carrigan is an efficient Manhattan police chief.

Featured

- Bromwell
- Andy Lewis is a reformed seducer, escorting Harriet Marsh around Manhattan.
- Harriet Marsh is an educated spinster from Phoenix, Arizona.
- Lottie Hanson
- Nellie Pierce
- Joe Wells
- Clarke
- D.A. is the prosecutor in Ramsey's trial for murder.

Bit players

- A Maid, a Butler, Clerk of the Court

== Synopsis ==
This synopsis has been compiled from contemporaneous newspaper and magazine reviews.

Prologue (The Bruce home in Galveston, Texas.) John Bruce and his wife Laura quarrel, ending with him throwing her out of the house since she wants a divorce. (Curtain)

Act I (A salon in the Ramsey's New York residence.) The ex-Laura Bush is now remarried to Paul Ramsey, who works for a bank. His boss is Dick Turner, a serial vamp who preys on married women. Turner has designs on Laura, so he sends Ramsey off to San Francisco to get him out of the way. But Ramsey is suspicious of his boss; he hires a detective to secretly watch over Laura. However, unknown to Ramsey, the detective is Laura's ex-husband, John Bruce, who seeks revenge on her. (Curtain)

Act II (A Manhattan apartment hotel room, just under room 13.) John Bruce has wired the room above with a speaking tube that feeds a Dictaphone in this room, with a stenographer present to transcribe completed rolls. He summons Paul Ramsey to hear what he thinks is his wife meeting with Dick Turner. But Laura has been intercepted by Edna Crain, who sent her off while she met Dick Turner in Room 13. Enraged at his wife's supposed infidelity, Ramsey rushes out and a moment later a gunshot is heard, followed by Edna Crain coming down the fire escape wearing only a diaphanous negligee. (Curtain)

Act III (Room 13 in the Manhattan apartment hotel.) Chief Carrigan takes charge of the investigation into Dick Turner's murder. The gun is found in the room and Paul is charged with homicide. Laura sacrifices her honor by insisting she was in the room with Dick Turner, to protect her husband by casting the killing as a crime passionel. (Curtain)

Act IV (A corridor in the Criminal Courts Building. By darkening the corridor lighting and the use of a scrim curtain, this scene also displayed events happening in the court room.) John Bruce changes his testimony on the witness stand, identifying Edna Crain and not Laura as the woman in Room 13. The jury still acquits Paul, despite the mistaken identity. (Note: Reviewers were dubious about this, as there was no doubt Ramsey had shot Turner, but conceded audiences expected the verdict.) (Curtain)

== Original production ==
=== Background ===
Samuel Shipman was a native New Yorker, a graduate of Columbia University who inspired by literary greats wrote nothing but plays after college. Max Marcin started as a newspaperman, covering crime stories such as Harry Kendall Thaw's trial for the murder of Stanford White. He supplemented his income by writing short stories then moved on to plays. Shipman, who already had two long-running plays on Broadway with Friendly Enemies and East Is West, shared his principles for popular playwriting: find a novel idea or new slant on an old situation, exercise concision in dialogue, employ characterization, and eschew perfect villains or heroes.

Shipman received a $300 advance from Sam H. Harris to write the play that eventually became The Woman in Room 13. Cohan and Harris decided they couldn't use it, so Shipman sold The Target to A. H. Woods, who wanted it as a vehicle for Clara Joel. The Target, at that time a three-act play by Shipman alone, was given a one-week tryout at Nixon's Apollo Theatre in Atlantic City, New Jersey in July 1917. It starred Clara Joel, Harry C. Browne, and Emmett Corrigan and was directed by Ira Hards. The next time it came to public notice in December 1918, it was a four-act play with prologue by Shipman and Marcin.

The Woman in Room 13 had a one-night tryout in Providence, Rhode Island on December 30, 1918. The role of Paul Ramsey was played by John B. Mason, who became ill and was replaced in early January by John Waldron. Mason died on January 12, 1919, at a sanitarium in Connecticut; producer A. H. Woods arranged for his funeral.

=== Cast ===
Principal cast from the Broadway run.
Role	Actor	Dates	Notes and sources
Laura Bruce	Janet Beecher	Jan 15, 1919 - Jun 14, 1919	
Paul Ramsey	Charles Waldron	Jan 15, 1919 - Jun 14, 1919	
John Bruce	Lowell Sherman	Jan 15, 1919 - Jun 14, 1919	
Dick Turner	Kenneth Hill	Jan 15, 1919 - Jun 14, 1919	
Edna Crane	Gail Kane	Jan 15, 1919 - Jun 14, 1919	
Chief Carrigan	DeWitt Jennings	Jan 15, 1919 - Jun 14, 1919	
Bromwell	Willis Claire	Jan 15, 1919 - Jun 14, 1919	
Andy Lewis	Will Deming	Jan 15, 1919 - Jun 14, 1919	
Harriet Marsh	Fay Wallace	Jan 15, 1919 - Jun 14, 1919	
Lottie Hanson	Dorothy Parker	Jan 15, 1919 - Jun 14, 1919	This was an English actress, daughter of playwright Louis N. Parker, not the American poet, writer, and critic.
Nellie Pierce	Catherine Tower	Jan 15, 1919 - Jun 14, 1919	
Joe Wells	Charles Mather	Jan 15, 1919 - Jun 14, 1919	
Clarke	Joseph Munson	Jan 15, 1919 - Jun 14, 1919	
The D.A.	Dore Rogers	Jan 15, 1919 - Jun 14, 1919	

=== Broadway premiere and reception ===
“And I was kindly inclined towards the last act, too, for the courtroom scene is done in a few mercifully brief glimpses. If I had anything to do with making the laws of these United States, I should make twenty years imprisonment the penalty for writing any play containing a courtroom scene; anyone dramatizing a Saturday Evening Post story would get the chair.”
– Dorothy Parker on The Woman in Room 13

The production had its Broadway premiere at the Booth Theatre on January 14, 1919. The reviewer for The Brooklyn Daily Eagle said "there is so much crammed into the prologue and first two acts that the last two seem rather mild by comparison". They also noted the prevalence of "smooth and immaculate male vampires" like Dick Turner were challenging the traditional female vamps in recent plays. The Brooklyn Daily Times critic said the plot was conventional but cited two novel stage effects: first, when Gail Kane as Edith Crane enters a darkened room wearing a sheer gown and is suddenly illuminated by floodlights; and second, in the final act when the courthouse corridor is darkened, revealing courtroom testimony through a scrim curtain in imitation of film's "cut-in" shots.

Heywood Broun saluted the authors for their play construction, though the last act dragged and left questions in his mind. Broun noted the characters were not admirable nor even likable, but the business types surprised him by openly discussing their salaries: "not the custom among newspaper and theatrical circles" in which Broun moved. The New York Times critic ascribed to Max Marcin credit for "tricks in melodrama" or "maxmarcinisms" that made the play work. (Note: This was in contrast to Heywood Broun who reported the play was largely by Samuel Shipman, an assertion he would recant several days later, and of Dorothy Parker who thought Percival Wilde's prologue the best part of the play.) Columnist Lawrence Reamer identified a weakness generated by the prologue, in that audiences lost sympathy with the wife for deserting her husband, despite her later sacrifice for the new husband.

=== Change of Venue ===
The Woman in Room 13 closed at the Booth Theatre on Saturday, April 26, and reopened Monday, April 28, 1919 at the Republic Theatre.

=== Broadway closing ===
The production finished its Broadway run at the Republic Theatre on Saturday, June 14, 1919.

== Adaptations ==
=== Film ===
- The Woman in Room 13 (1920) - Silent film, produced by Goldwyn, starred Pauline Frederick. The reviewer McElliott said there was worry among some drama critics that playwrights were now writing for the stage with one eye on film adaptation.
- The Woman in Room 13 (1932) - Adapted by Guy Bolton, directed by Henry King, produced by Fox, this sound film starred Elissa Landi and Ralph Bellamy, with Neil Hamilton, Myrna Loy, and Gilbert Roland.
