= The Woman in Room 13 =

1920 film by Frank Lloyd

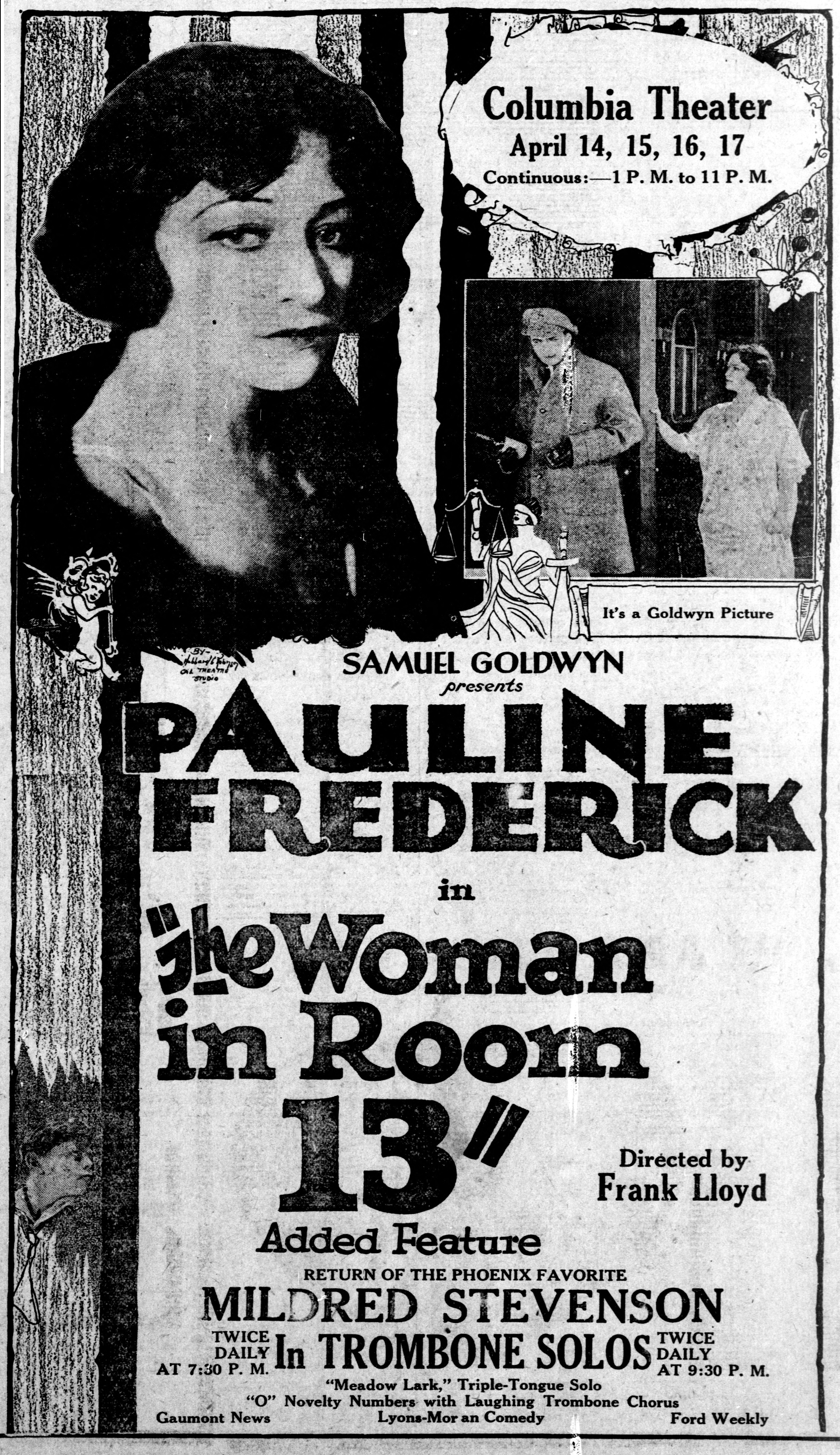
- Newspaper advertisement.
- Directed by: Frank Lloyd
- Written by: Richard Schayer (scenario)
- Based on: The Woman in Room 13 by Max Marcin, Samuel Shipman, and Percival Wilde
- Produced by: Samuel Goldwyn
- Starring: Pauline Frederick
- Cinematography: Devereaux Jennings (credited as J.D. Jennings)
- Distributed by: Goldwyn Pictures
- Release date: April 1920
- Running time: 5 reels
- Country: United States
- Language: Silent (English intertitles)

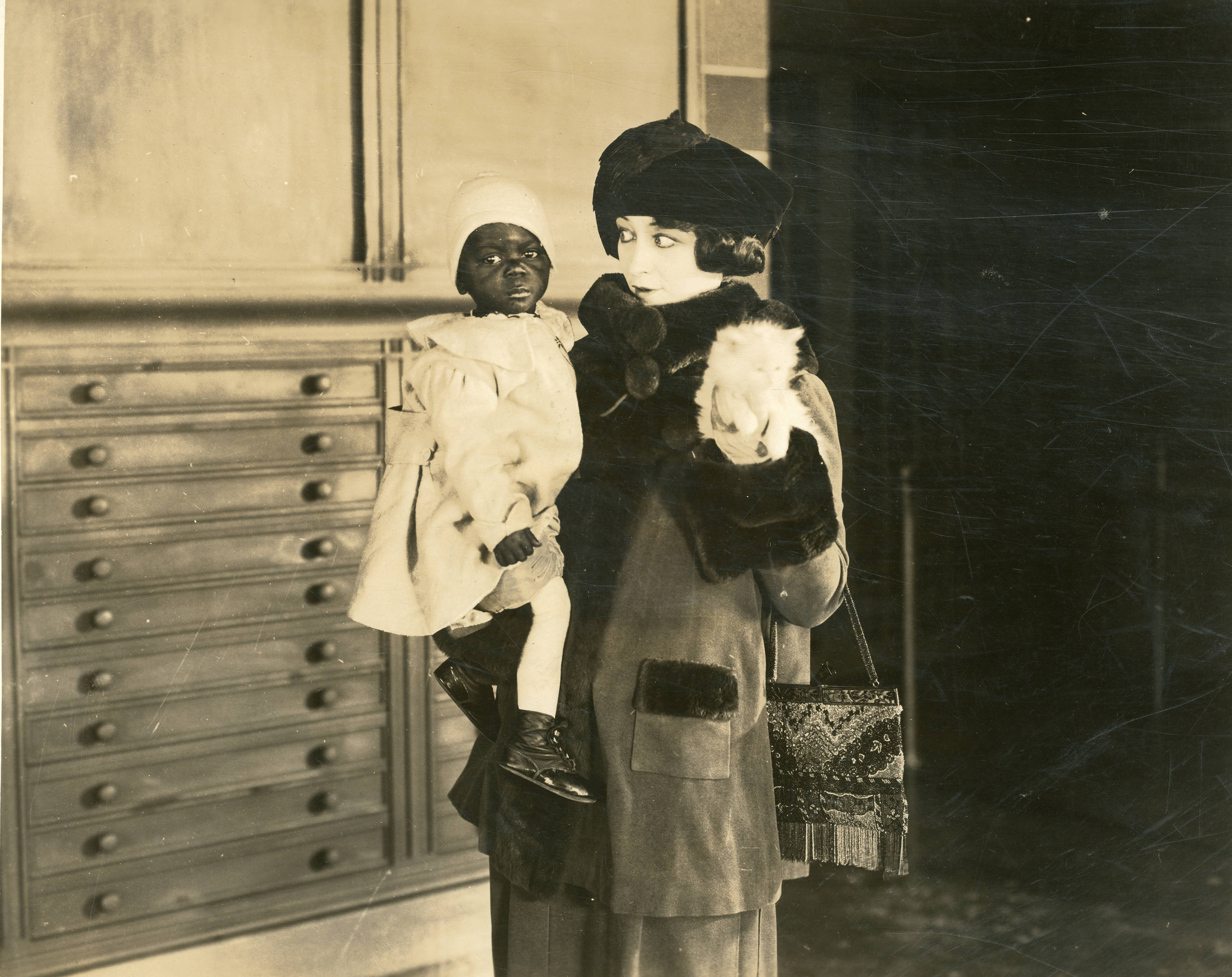
Scene from the film.

The Woman in Room 13 is a 1920 American silent mystery drama film directed by Frank Lloyd and starring Pauline Frederick. It was produced and distributed by Goldwyn Pictures and is based on a Broadway play of the same name, The Woman in Room 13. It premiered at the California Theatre in Los Angeles, CA.

The film was remade at Fox in 1932 as a talkie.

== Plot ==
As described in a film magazine, Laura Bruce is divorced from her husband following an unpleasant matrimonial term. She then marries Paul Ramsey, whom she has always loved. Dick Turner, his employer and enamored of Laura, sends her husband away on a business trip. A murder is committed and detective John Bruce seeks to fasten the crime upon Paul. After he fails to do so, a happy ending results.

== Cast ==
- Pauline Frederick as Laura Bruce
- Richard Tucker as Joe
- Charles Clary as John Bruce
- John Bowers as Paul Ramsey
- Robert McKim as Dick Turner
- Sidney Ainsworth as Andy Lewis
- Charles Arling as Carrigan
- Marguerite Snow as Edna Crane
- Emily Chichester as Harriet Marsh
- Kate Lester as Lottie Hanson
- Golda Madden as The Girl

== Preservation ==
The Woman In Room 13 is currently presumed lost. In February of 2021, the film was cited by the National Film Preservation Board on their Lost U.S. Silent Feature Films list.
