= Clara Lipman =

American actress

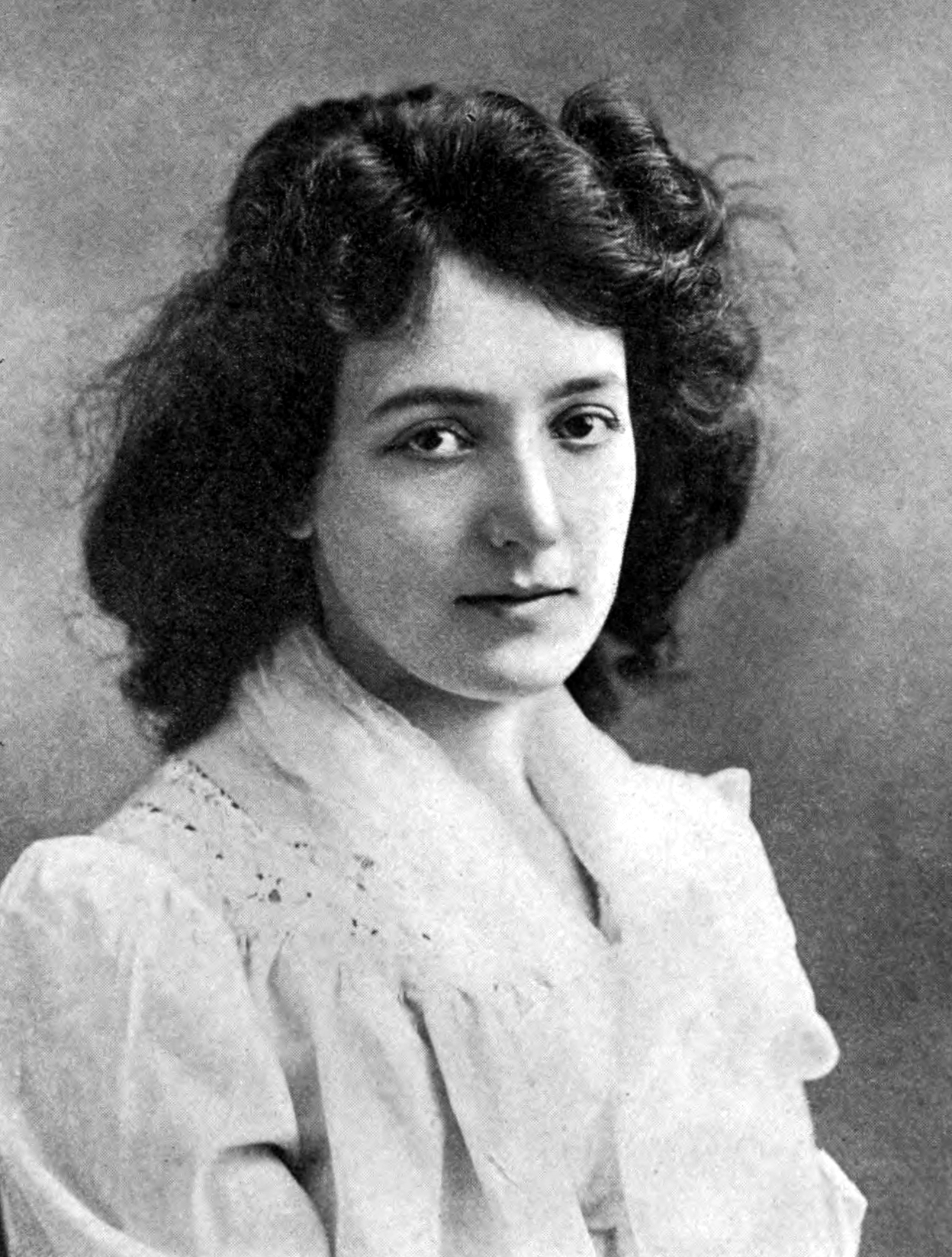
- Lipman in 1901
- Born: December 6, 1864; Chicago, US
- Died: June 22, 1952 (aged 87); New York City, US
- Other name: Clara Lipman Mann
- Occupations: Stage actress, playwright
- Spouse: Louis Mann

Clara Lipman (December 6, 1864 – June 22, 1952) was an American musical comedy actress and playwright whose career began in 1885 and continued on until her retirement in 1927. She was the wife of comedian Louis Mann and the sister of popular Lieder singer Mattie Lipman Marum.

== Biography ==
Clara Lipman was born in Chicago on December 6, 1864, the second of five children raised by Abram and Josephine (née Brumer) Lipman. Her father‘s income as a loan broker was such that she was able to attend college and receive private tutoring in the classics, music and languages.

Lipman started in amateur theatre productions in Chicago before making her professional stage début at Niblo's Garden in New York City on November 30, 1885, as Nettie in the Kiralfy Brothers spectacular, The Rat Catcher (an adaptation of The Pied Piper of Hamelin). The following January she joined Helena Modjeska’s company as Bérangère in Sardou’s Odette, and the next season in Modjeska’s productions of the Alexandre Dumas play, Camille, the comedy Frou Frou by Henri Meilhac and Ludovic Halévy and Shakespeare's As You Like It. Lipman spent the subsequent season or two in Chicago performing with Friedrich Mitterwurzer on the German-language stage before joining Charles Dickson's company in the early 1890s. There her success in playing Molly Summers in Incog would open the door for her to later play such principal roles as Madge Tippett in Little Tippett, Gertrude Sanders in The Laughing Girl, Clara Loveridge in The Strange Adventures of Miss Brown, Julie Bon-Bon in The Girl from Paris Liane Tourbillion in The Girl in the Barracks, Estelle Coocoo in The Telephone Girl, Jane Anderson in Master and Pupil and Elizabeth Carter in All on Account of Eliza.

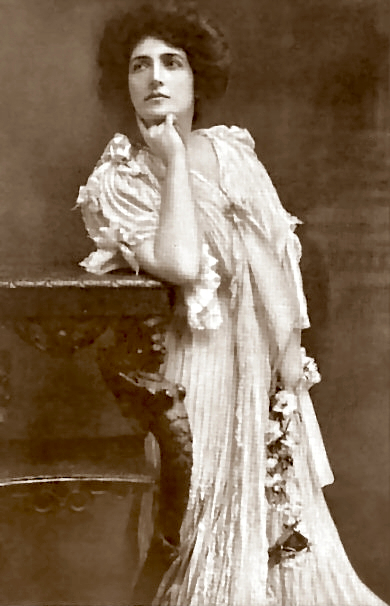
Clara Lipman in The Theatre Magazine, 1910

Lipman married Louis Mann not long after the two appeared together in Incog. In his 1912 memoir, Fifty Years in Theatrical Management, Michael Leavitt described his involvement in the couple’s eventual marriage as follows:

The year following the tour of the “Ineog” company, Mr. Mann came to me and entreated that I should tour Miss Lipman and himself, as co-stars in a new piece which he submitted to me. I was inclined to refuse, stating that I did not think the venture would be a financial success. “You’ve given others a chance, why don’t you give me one ?” urged Mann. When I still remained obdurate, he confided to me that he was anxious to marry Miss Lipman, and that he had been given hope of winning her providing he could make her a star. At last I yielded, and the piece was a success. At the close of the season, Mr. Mann was happily wedded to the girl of his choice, who has since been justified in his confidence in her by her becoming one of the favorite stars of legitimate drama. Mann, himself, is to-day among the first comedians of the American stage, and has frequently remarked to me that he owes, not alone his stellar honors, but his domestic happiness as well, to my generosity and good will.

Lipman and her husband were probably best remembered by audiences of the day for their performances in The Laughing Girl, The Strange Adventures of Mrs. Brown, The Girl from Paris, The Telephone Girl and All on Account of Eliza. She also found success as the author of some twenty-two plays, twelve in collaboration with the playwright Samuel Shipman. Several of her plays were produced on Broadway with Elevating a Husband achieving the most success in 1912 with a run of 120 performances. Lipman and Mann’s last appearance on Broadway came in 1927 playing Madame Nina de Poulet and Karl Kraft in the dramatic comedy, That French Lady.

Lipman died on June 22, 1952, at her residence in New York City. She lost her husband in 1931 and at the time of her death the only surviving close relative mentioned in her New York Times obituary was the daughter of a sister.
