= Lakewood Theater (Madison, Maine) =

- U.S. National Register of Historic Places
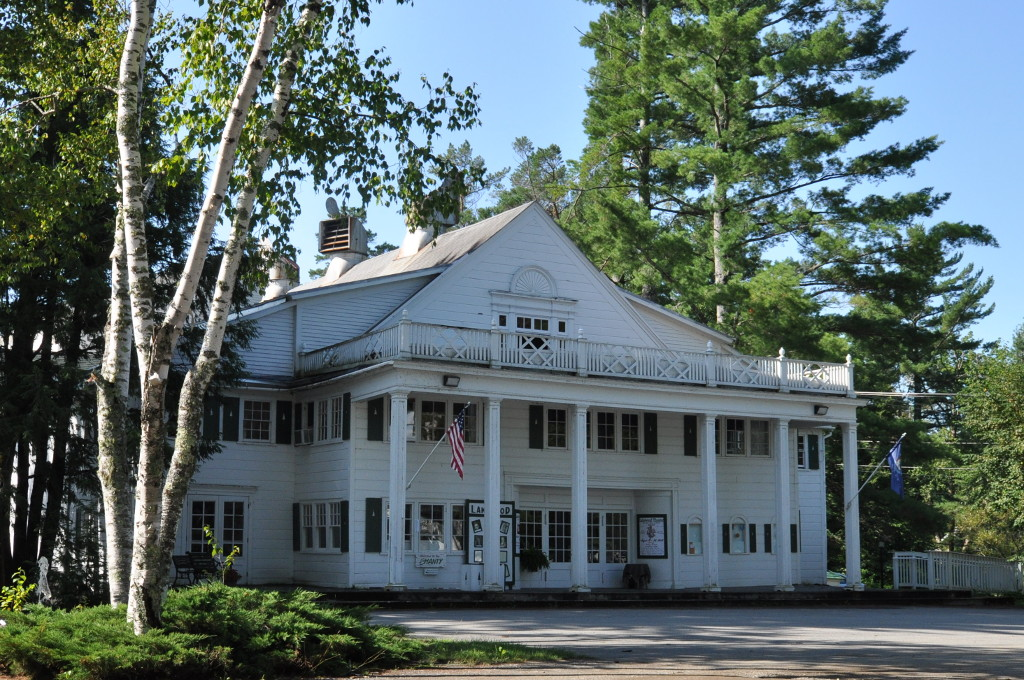
- The main theater

- Location within Maine Location within the United States
- Location: 76 Theatre Road, Madison, Maine
- Coordinates: 44°49′53″N 69°46′38″W
- Area: 2 acres (0.81 ha)
- Built: 1898
- Architectural style: Colonial Revival
- NRHP reference No.: 75000111
- Added to NRHP: June 18, 1975

The Lakewood Theater is a theater complex at 76 Theatre Road in Madison, Maine, on the shores of Lake Wesserunsett. Founded in 1898 but only properly developed in 1901, it is one of the oldest summer theaters in the United States. In the 1920s and '30s, the theater was one of the major off-Broadway stops, now hosting the community theater productions of Curtain Up Enterprises. The main auditorium is located on a former 1882 religious camp meeting sanctuary that was extensively altered in 1925–26 to accommodate the theater. It was listed on the National Register of Historic Places in 1975.

== Description and history ==
The Lakewood Theater complex is set on the western shore of Lake Wesserunsett, off United States Route 201 in eastern Madison. The main theater building is a 2 1/2-story Colonial Revival wood-frame structure with a gable roof. A two-story porch extends across much of the front, with square-paneled posts and diamond-pattern balustrade.

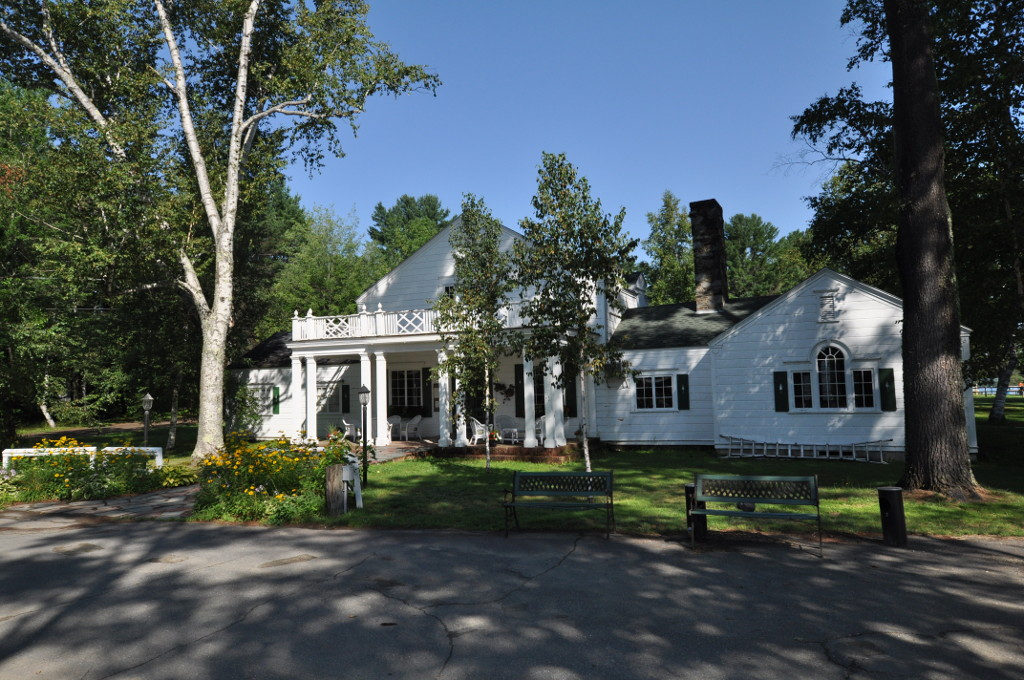
The theater's restaurant building

The property on which the theater is built was part of a larger resort area developed by owners of the area's trolley car network to draw people to use their facilities. This particular property was where, in 1882, a religious camp meeting sanctuary was built, which forms the core of the theater building. In 1884, the building was converted into a skating rink, and in 1898 its use as a theater began. The theater's rise to prominence began in 1901, when Herbert Swett took over its management, and oversaw improvements to its physical plant over a 20-year tenure. By the mid-1920s, when the building achieved its present form, the theater was a major tryout location for Broadway shows. After World War II, these types of shows declined, and the theater has since then primarily shown touring productions. Numerous famous actors, including Vincent Price, Ethel Barrymore, and George M. Cohan have performed there.

Playwright John B. Hymer was known as the 'mayor of Lakewood' and collaborated with fellow playwright Samuel Shipman in Lakewood. He also built Colony House there in 1929. His son Warren Hymer stayed with him and went on to a career as a movie actor.

== Significance ==
In order to stimulate passenger traffic, many trolley car systems at the turn of the century participated in the development of amusement centers in scenic locations along their lines, particularly at terminal points. This was 'the great age of the trolley car and this form of transportation became, for a time, a major recreational outlet.

Such a park was developed in 1895 in Lakewood Grove on the shore of Lake Wesserunsett by the Somerset Traction Company of Skowhegan, Maine. Along with other amusement features it established in 1898 the Lakewood Theater which between 1925 and 1941 became the most important summer theater in the country.

Its rise to eminence was started by Herbert L. Swett, a young man who, in 1901, became manager and started to develop an organization and physical plant that was to become the premier summer theater for two decades with the most prolonged ongoing record of summer seasons in America. From the 1920s until World War II it was the major tryout theater for potential Broadway productions and became known as “Broadway in Maine.”

The war created an interim cessation of productions in 1943 and 1944. But from 1945 to the present, the Lakewood Theater completed the transition so typical in summer theaters from a resident stock company to the “package” system with a new cast every week.

The theater and resort aspects of Lakewood are related; the theater making the resort and the attractions of the resort making it possible to bring actors to Maine and draw theater patrons to Lakewood Grove for forty-five years. This partnership has made Lakewood the subject of attention by the press and noted theater critics and commentators.

Famous names in the annals of the American stage have been intimately connected with the history of Lakewood. In 1925 Howard Lindsay became director and helped to create through his talents and New York contacts the national reputation which the theater achieved. Stars like Dorothy Stickney and Walter Hampden began to grace the Lakewood Stage to be followed by George M. Cohan, Cornelia Otis Skinner, Vincent Price, Ethel Barrymore and many others who acted with the resident company.

Lakewood was the scene of premiere performances of numerous later Broadway hits as well which includes "Life With Father".

In recent years its stage has been graced by a host of stars and personalities from Broadway and Hollywood. The trolley cars have long since passed from the scene but the footlights at Lakewood continue to illuminate the theatrical tradition they began.

The playhouse allegedly was one of the first theaters in the United States to offer summer productions.

== See also ==
- National Register of Historic Places listings in Somerset County, Maine
