= United Artists Theatre (Chicago) =

Former theater and movie theater in Illinois

- Apollo Theater
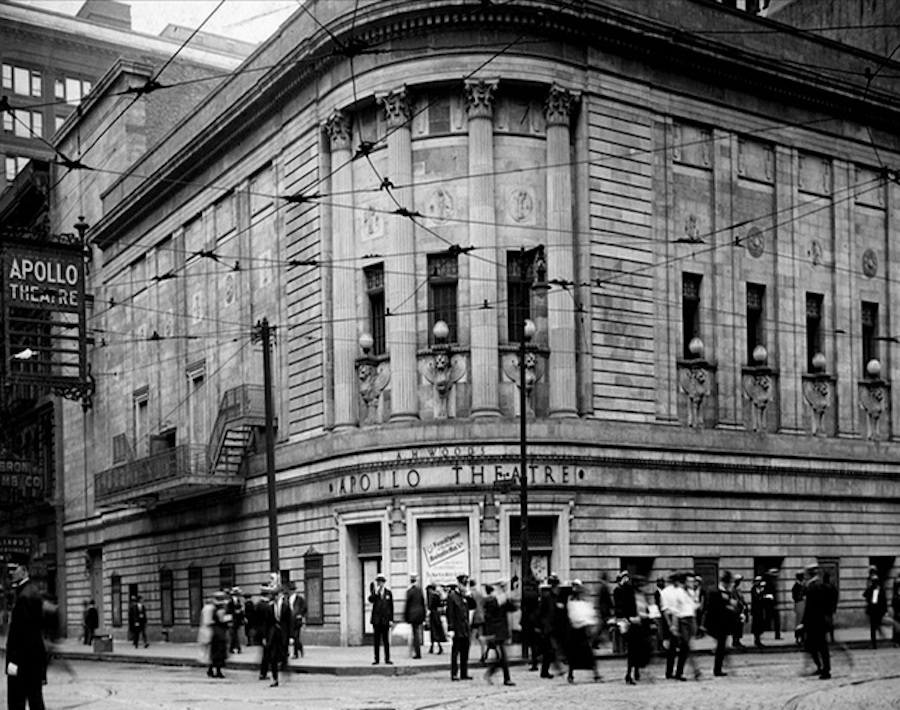
- in 1922
- Interactive map of United Artists Theatre
- Address: 45 W. Randolph St., Chicago; U.S.
- Coordinates: 41.8843°N 87.6292°W
- Capacity: 1,703

Construction
- Opened: 1921
- Closed: 1987
- Architect: Holabird and Roche

Website
- cinematreasures.org

The United Artists Theatre was a popular movie theatre located in the Chicago Loop. It was built as a live venue called the Apollo, then later turned into a cinema. It was demolished in 1989.

== Live theater venue ==
The Apollo Theatre was constructed in 1921 by theatrical producer A. H. Woods, who also owned the nearby Woods Theatre. It was located on Randolph Street, which was once known as Chicago's Great White Way and continues to be the center of Chicago's theater district. Designed by the architectural firm of Holabird and Roche, the theater was notable for its incorporation of elements of the Greek Revival style.

== Cinema ==
The building was purchased by the Balaban and Katz cinema chain and renamed in 1927. It was later operated by ABC/Great States and Cineplex Odeon.

The theater featured ornate interior design common of the movie palaces of its era. It was known for showing exclusive runs and premieres of top Hollywood films. In the 1970s, the theater focused mostly on the action and horror films popular at the time, with the occasional blockbuster, such as the house-record breaking run of Jaws.

From the 1950s until its closing, the theater featured an elaborate marquee, which wrapped around the building's curved corner entrance. This marquee can be seen in many films including The Blues Brothers, Adventures in Babysitting, and Ferris Bueller's Day Off.

== Closing and demolition ==
It continued operation until late 1987, and was demolished in 1989.

The building was located on Block 37, a parcel in the Chicago Loop that saw nearly every building demolished in 1989. Various projects were proposed for the site before construction began on a new structure in 2005.
