= Janet Beecher =

American stage and screen actress

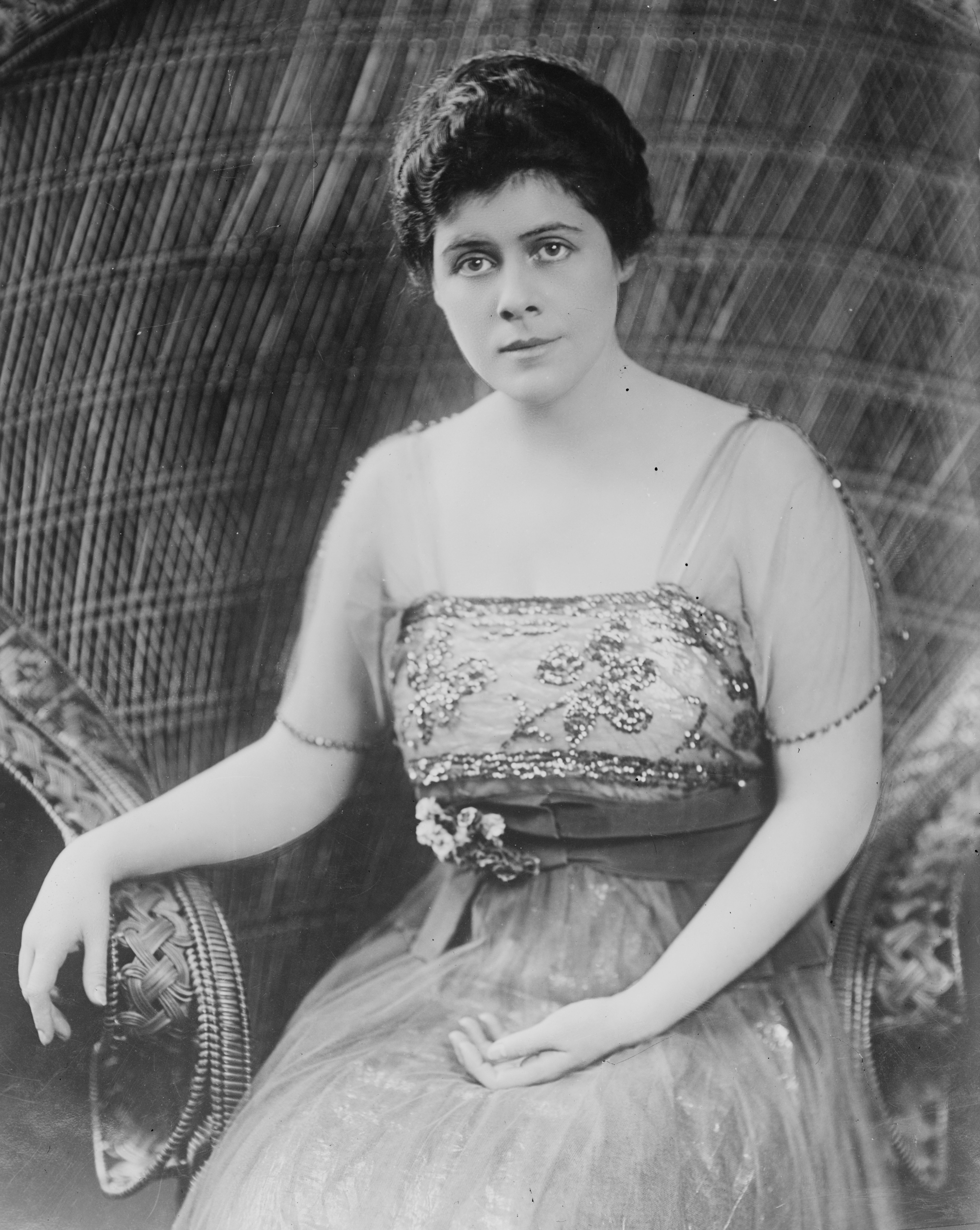
- Born: Janet Meysenburg; October 21, 1884; Jefferson City, Missouri, U.S.
- Died: August 6, 1955 (aged 70); Washington, Connecticut, U.S.
- Occupation: Actress
- Years active: 1903–1943
- Spouse(s): Harry R. Guggenheimer (1913–1919; div.); Richard H. Hoffman (?–1935; div.)
- Children: 1

Janet Beecher (born Janet Meysenberg; October 21, 1884 – August 6, 1955) was an American stage and screen actress.

== Early years ==
The daughter of Mr. and Mrs. E. A. Von Meysenburg, Beecher was born in Jefferson City, Missouri. Her sister was actress Olive Wyndham. The sisters were related to Harriet Beecher Stowe on their mother's side.

Her father's work as a vice-consul for Germany led to her growing up in Chicago.

== Career ==
Beecher was a supporting player and lead on the Broadway stage between the 1900s and 1940s. Her Broadway debut came in The Education of Mr. Pipp (1905). Her final Broadway play was The Late George Apley (1944). Other notable plays she appeared in included The Lottery Man (1909), The Concert (1910), The Purple Road (1913), Fair and Warmer (1915), The Woman in Room 13 (1919), Call the Doctor (1920), A Bill of Divorcement (1921), The Love Child (1922), A Kiss in a Taxi (1925), and Courage (1928).

Between 1915 and 1943, she appeared in nearly fifty motion pictures. She remains perhaps best-remembered as a character actress during Hollywood's golden age, often seen in roles as "firm but compassionate matriarchs". She was known for her roles as Ginger Rogers' mother in The Story of Vernon and Irene Castle (1939), Tyrone Power's mother in the adventure film The Mark of Zorro (1940), and Henry Fonda's mother in Preston Sturges' screwball comedy The Lady Eve (1941). She retired from film business in 1943, but managed to play a role in the television series Lux Video Theatre in 1952.

== Personal life ==
Beecher was married twice: first to Harry R. Guggenheimer and then to Richard H. Hoffman. She had one child, a son named Richard, by her second marriage.

=== "Automatic writing" controversy ===
Automatic writing played a pivotal role in Beecher's divorce from her second husband, Richard Hoffman.

Beecher's mother, Mrs. Oral J. Wyndham, produced messages that she said were sent by spirits, but which Hoffman said were created by Wyndham's subconscious mind. After six years of marriage, both Beecher and Hoffman filed suit for separation, based on both the contentious messages and a disagreement about religion's influence in raising their son. Beecher, her sister, and their mother were members of the Unity Scientific Christianity Association. The judge who granted the divorce wrote, "both the practice of spirit writing and the content of the messages undoubtedly affected the family society. The plaintiff was frankly hostile to the practice, while some of the writings criticized his character and behavior in unmistakable terms."

== Death ==
On August 7, 1955, Beecher died at her sister's home in Washington, Connecticut, at age 70.

== Filmography ==
Year	Title	Role	Notes
1915	Fine Feathers	Jane Reynolds	
1933	Gallant Lady	Maria Sherwood	
1934	The Last Gentleman	Helen Barr	
1934	The President Vanishes	Mrs. Mary Stanley	
1934	The Mighty Barnum	Nancy Barnum	
1935	Let's Live Tonight	Mrs. Routledge	
1935	So Red the Rose	Sally Bedford	
1935	Village Tale	Amy Somerville	
1935	The Dark Angel	Mrs. Shannon	
1936	Love Before Breakfast	Mrs. Colby	
1936	I'd Give My Life	Governor's wife	
1936	The Longest Night	Mrs. Briggs, Carl's Mother	
1937	The Good Old Soak	Matilda Hawley	
1937	The Thirteenth Chair	Lady Crosby	
1937	Between Two Women	Miss Pringle	
1937	Big City	Sophie Sloane	
1937	My Dear Miss Aldrich	Mrs. Sinclair	
1937	Beg, Borrow or Steal	Mrs. Agatha Steward	
1937	Rosalie	Miss Baker	
1938	Judge Hardy's Children	Miss Budge, Suzanne's Tutor	
1938	Yellow Jack	Miss Macdade	
1938	Woman Against Woman	Mrs. Holland	
1938	Say It in French	Mrs. Carrington	
1939	I Was a Convict	Mrs. Martha Harrison	
1939	The Story of Vernon and Irene Castle	Mrs. Foote	
1939	Man of Conquest	Mrs. Sarah Lea	
1939	Career	Mrs. Amy Cruthers	
1939	Laugh It Off	Mary Carter	
1939	Slightly Honorable	Mrs. Cushing	
1940	All This, and Heaven Too	Miss Haines	
1940	The Mark of Zorro	Senora Isabella Vega	
1940	Bitter Sweet	Lady Daventry	
1941	The Lady Eve	Mrs. Pike	
1941	The Man Who Lost Himself	Mrs. Milford	
1941	Men of Boys Town	Spokeswoman	(scenes deleted)
1941	West Point Widow	Mrs. Graves	
1941	For Beauty's Sake	Miss Merton	
1941	A Very Young Lady	Miss Steele	
1941	The Parson of Panamint	Mrs. Tweedy	
1942	A Tragedy at Midnight	Third Mrs. Charles Miller	Uncredited
1942	Reap the Wild Wind	Mrs. Mottram	
1942	Men of Texas	Mrs. Sam Houston	
1942	Hi, Neighbor	Hattie Greenfield	
1942	Mrs. Wiggs of the Cabbage Patch	Mrs. Olcott	
1942	Silver Queen	Mrs. Laura Forsythe	
1943	Henry Aldrich Gets Glamour	Mrs. Eloise Lowry	Uncredited
1952	Lux Video Theatre	Kate Walburn	1 episode, (final appearance)
