= East Is West (1930 film) =

1930 film by Monta Bell

East is West
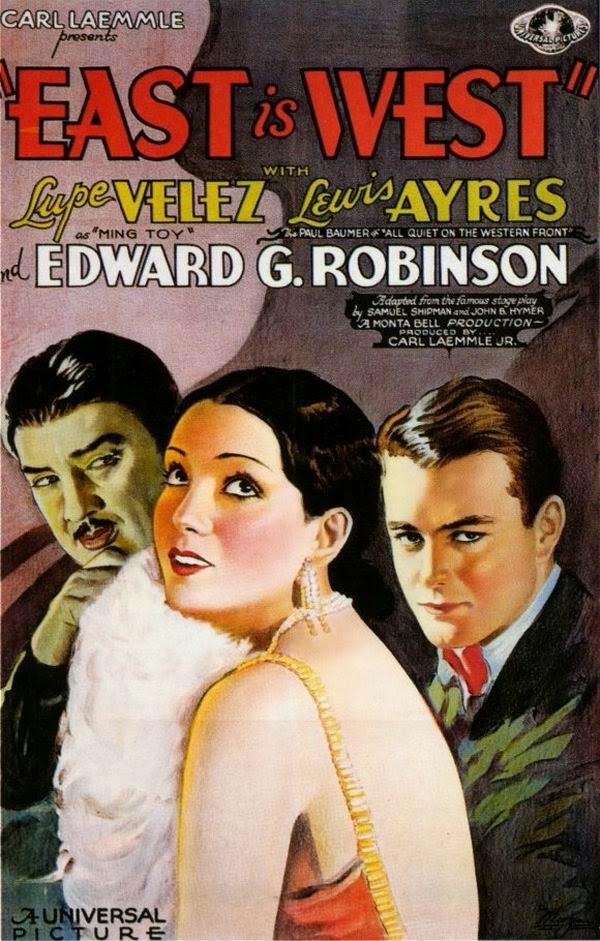
- Promotional poster
- Directed by: Monta Bell
- Written by: Tom Reed (screenplay, dialogue); Winnifred Eaton
- Based on: East Is West by John B. Hymer and Samuel Shipman
- Produced by: Carl Laemmle; Carl Laemmle, Jr. Monta Bell; E. M. Asher
- Starring: Lupe Vélez; Lew Ayres; Edward G. Robinson
- Cinematography: Jerome Ash
- Edited by: Harry Marker
- Music by: Heinz Roemheld; Sam Perry
- Distributed by: Universal Pictures
- Release date: October 23, 1930
- Running time: 75 minutes
- Country: United States
- Language: English

East Is West is a 1930 American pre-Code crime drama film produced and distributed by Universal. It was directed by Monta Bell and stars Lupe Vélez, Lew Ayres and Edward G. Robinson. It is based on a 1918 Broadway play, East is West, which starred Fay Bainter. A silent film version from 1922, also titled East Is West, starred Constance Talmadge.

E. Alyn Warren reprises his role from the silent version.

== Plot ==
East Is West (full film)

Ming Toy is on the auction block in China. She is saved by Billy and taken to San Francisco by Lo Sang Kee. To save her from deportation she is sold to Charlie Yong, the Chop Suey King. Billy kidnaps her with plans of marriage.

== Cast ==
- Lupe Vélez as Ming Toy
- Lew Ayres as Billy Benson
- Edward G. Robinson as Charlie Yong
- E. Alyn Warren as Lo Sang Kee
- Tetsu Komai as Hop Toy
- Henry Kolker as Mr. Benson
- Mary Forbes as Mrs. Benson
- Edgar Norton as Thomas
- Charles Middleton as Dr. Fredericks
- Jean Hersholt as Man

== Alternate Version ==
While filming was done during the day, the sets were used at night for a Spanish-language version of the film titled Oriente es Occidente.
