= Madison, Maine =

Town in Maine, United States

- Town
- Logo
- Motto(s): "A great place to live, work & play!"
- Location within Maine Location within the United States
- Coordinates: 44°49′57″N 69°47′58″W
- Country: United States
- State: Maine
- County: Somerset

Area
  - Total: 54.82 sq mi (141.98 km^{2})
  - Land: 51.88 sq mi (134.37 km^{2})
  - Water: 2.94 sq mi (7.61 km^{2})
- Elevation: 446 ft (136 m)

Population (2020)
  - Total: 4,726
  - Density: 91/sq mi (35.2/km^{2})
- Time zone: UTC-5 (Eastern (EST))
  - Summer (DST): UTC-4 (EDT)
- ZIP code: 04950
- Area code: 207
- GNIS feature ID: 579027
- Website: www.madisonmaine.com

Madison (formerly Norridgewock) is a town in Somerset County, Maine, United States. The population was 4,726 at the 2020 census. It contains the census-designated place of the same name.

== History ==
The area was once territory of the Norridgewock Indians, a band of the Abenaki nation. Early visitors describe extensive fields cleared for cultivation. The tribe also fished the Kennebec River. French Jesuits established an early mission at the village, which was located at Old Point. But Father Sebastien Rale (or Rasle), appointed missionary in 1694, was suspected of abetting the tribe's raids on English settlements. Governor Joseph Dudley put a price on his head. British troops attacked the village in 1705 and again in 1722, but both times Father Rale escaped into the woods. But on August 23, 1724, during Father Rale's War, soldiers attacked the village unexpectedly, killing 26 warriors and wounding 14, with 150 survivors fleeing to Canada. Among the dead was Father Rale.

Settled by English colonists about 1773, the land would be surveyed in 1791. In 1775, Benedict Arnold and his troops would march through Norridgewock Plantation, as it was known, on their way to the ill-fated Battle of Quebec. The town had originally been settled under the name "Norridgewock Falls." This was later changed to "Bernardstown," after the major land owning family, the Bernards. It was then officially incorporated on March 7, 1804, the town was named after United States president James Madison. Farming was an early industry, with hay and cattle the principal products. The native rock is slate, and a quarry was established to extract it. Because of the region's abundant forests, lumbering developed as an industry, with four sawmills operated by water power on the Kennebec. Here the Norridgewock Falls drop 90 feet (27 m) over a mile, which attracted other manufacturers as well. In the 19th century, the small mill town had factories which produced carriages, window sash, window blinds, doors and coffins.

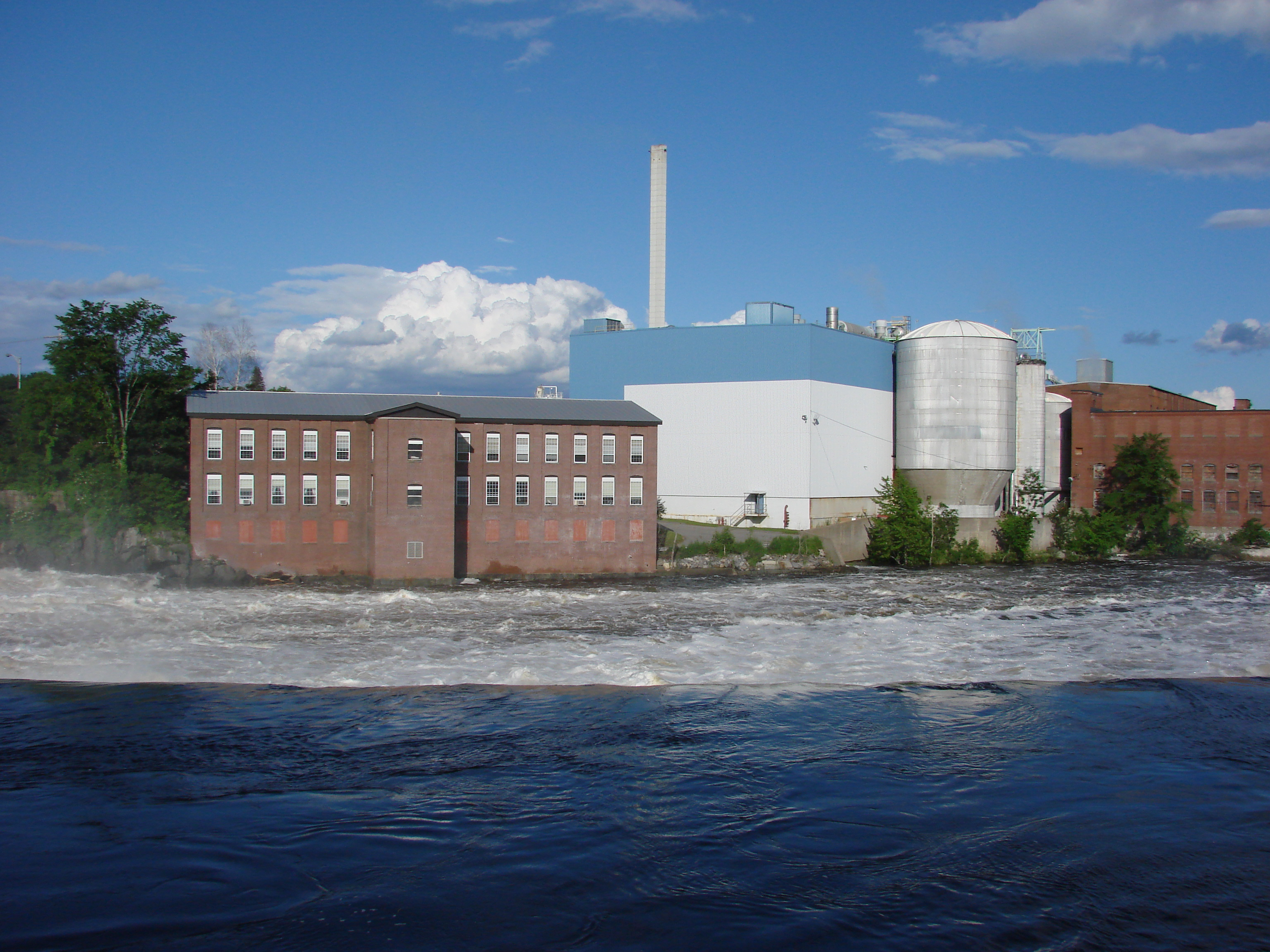
Looking across the Kennebec River at the Madison Paper Mill, Summer Solstice 2008

When the railroad was extended through Madison in 1875, larger mills were built. The first Madison Woolen Mill was constructed in 1881 near the bridge between Madison and Anson, with the firm's second mill built nearby in 1887. In 1890, the Manufacturing Investment Company built a sulfite mill, but it failed. It was taken over in 1899 by the Great Northern Paper Company, which rebuilt the plant to produce wood pulp and paper. Like many New England textile manufacturers, the town's woolen mills eventually went out of business, but the pulp and paper mill remained in operation as Madison Paper Industries until closing in May 2016 due to low demand for supercalender paper and Canadian competition.

In 1901, Lakewood Summer Theatre opened in East Madison on the western side of Lake Wesserunsett. Since 1967 it has been the official summer theatre of Maine, and the oldest continually operating summer theatre in America. Actors who have performed at Lakewood include John Travolta, Carol Channing, and Phyllis Diller

Completed in 2007 is the largest structure by volume in Maine, the Backyard Farms greenhouse that covers 24 acres (9.7 ha).

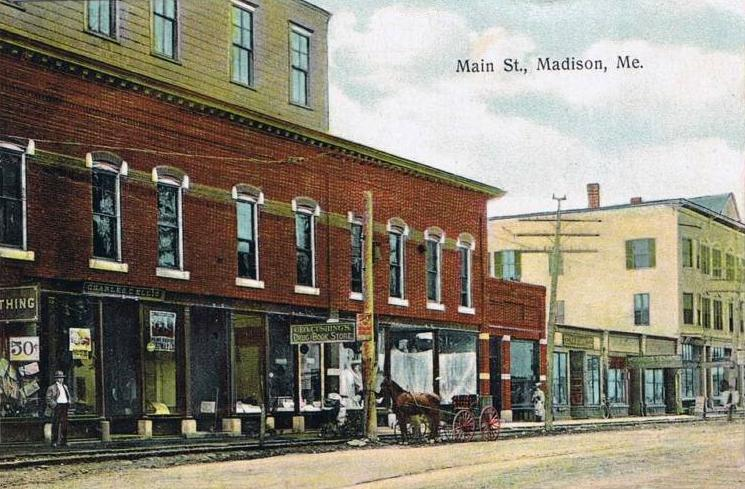
Main Street in 1911

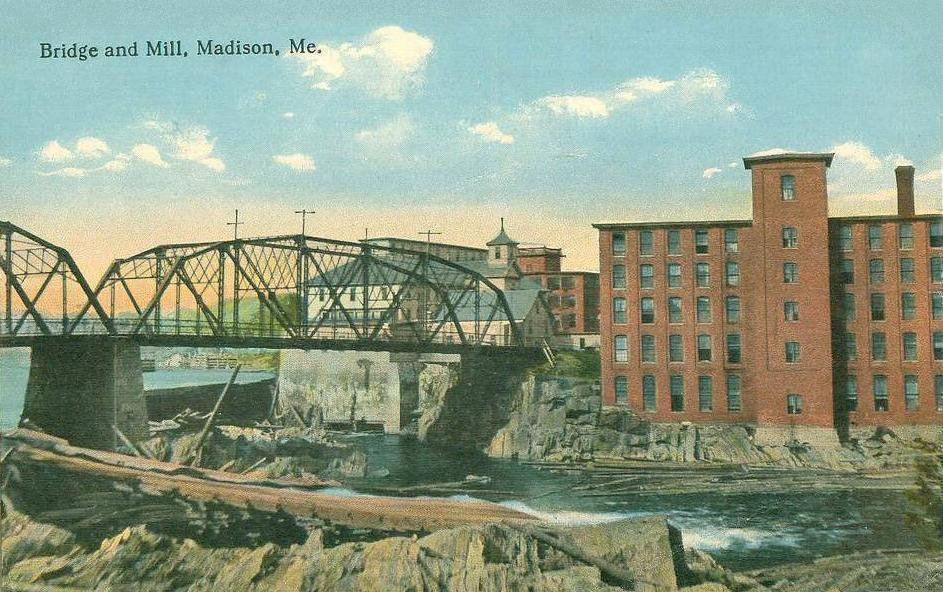
Bridge and mill c. 1912

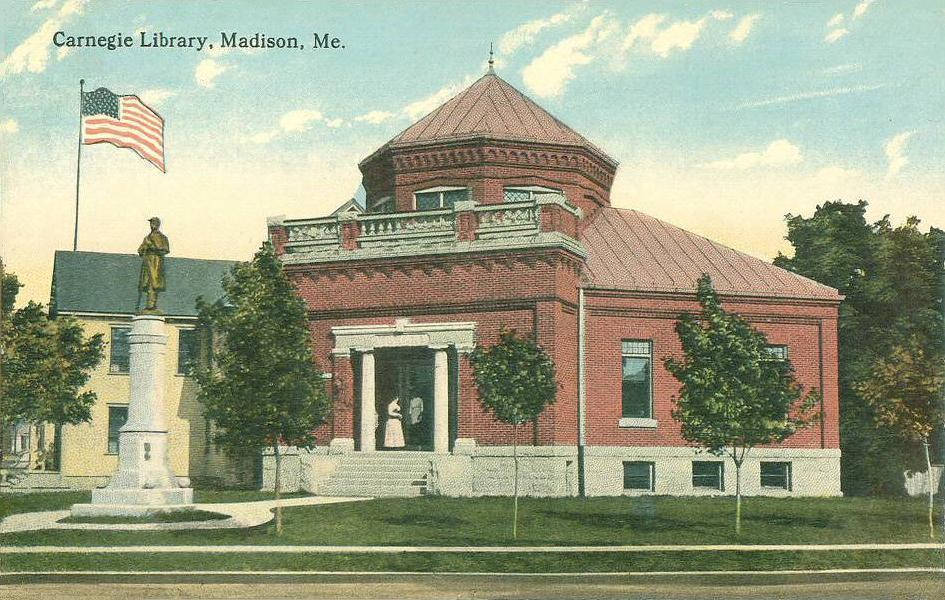
Public library c. 1912

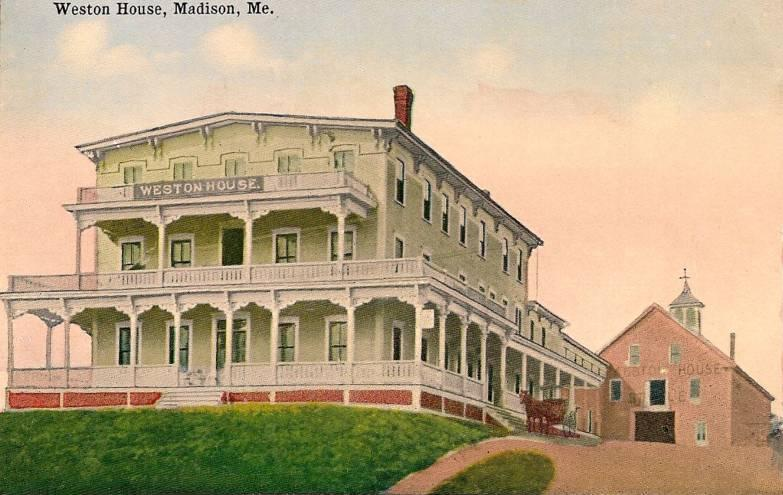
The Weston Hotel c. 1912

== Geography ==
According to the United States Census Bureau, the town has a total area of 54.82 square miles (141.98 km^{2}), of which 51.88 square miles (134.37 km^{2}) is land and 2.94 square miles (7.61 km^{2}) is water. Madison is drained by the Kennebec River.

=== Climate ===
Climate data for Madison, Maine (1991–2020 normals, extremes Feb 1894-Aug 1895, 1904–present)
Month	Jan	Feb	Mar	Apr	May	Jun	Jul	Aug	Sep	Oct	Nov	Dec	Year
Record high °F (°C)	64 (18)	61 (16)	82 (28)	89 (32)	97 (36)	99 (37)	102 (39)	102 (39)	95 (35)	89 (32)	76 (24)	62 (17)	102 (39)
Mean maximum °F (°C)	47.5 (8.6)	48.0 (8.9)	56.6 (13.7)	71.6 (22.0)	83.6 (28.7)	88.5 (31.4)	89.5 (31.9)	88.7 (31.5)	84.8 (29.3)	74.6 (23.7)	62.9 (17.2)	51.1 (10.6)	92.1 (33.4)
Mean daily maximum °F (°C)	26.9 (−2.8)	29.7 (−1.3)	38.5 (3.6)	51.1 (10.6)	64.2 (17.9)	73.2 (22.9)	78.9 (26.1)	77.8 (25.4)	70.2 (21.2)	57.0 (13.9)	44.0 (6.7)	33.0 (0.6)	53.7 (12.1)
Daily mean °F (°C)	16.2 (−8.8)	17.8 (−7.9)	27.9 (−2.3)	40.7 (4.8)	53.0 (11.7)	62.5 (16.9)	68.1 (20.1)	66.6 (19.2)	58.8 (14.9)	46.7 (8.2)	35.3 (1.8)	24.1 (−4.4)	43.1 (6.2)
Mean daily minimum °F (°C)	5.5 (−14.7)	5.9 (−14.5)	17.3 (−8.2)	30.4 (−0.9)	41.7 (5.4)	51.8 (11.0)	57.4 (14.1)	55.4 (13.0)	47.3 (8.5)	36.5 (2.5)	26.6 (−3.0)	15.2 (−9.3)	32.6 (0.3)
Mean minimum °F (°C)	−15.6 (−26.4)	−14.2 (−25.7)	−5.9 (−21.1)	19.7 (−6.8)	30.1 (−1.1)	40.4 (4.7)	48.1 (8.9)	45.1 (7.3)	33.9 (1.1)	24.4 (−4.2)	11.6 (−11.3)	−3.8 (−19.9)	−19.3 (−28.5)
Record low °F (°C)	−39 (−39)	−39 (−39)	−25 (−32)	1 (−17)	20 (−7)	24 (−4)	35 (2)	29 (−2)	23 (−5)	14 (−10)	−9 (−23)	−40 (−40)	−40 (−40)
Average precipitation inches (mm)	2.92 (74)	2.29 (58)	2.87 (73)	3.54 (90)	3.28 (83)	4.19 (106)	3.61 (92)	3.39 (86)	3.26 (83)	4.81 (122)	3.78 (96)	3.77 (96)	41.71 (1,059)
Average snowfall inches (cm)	18.6 (47)	19.2 (49)	12.6 (32)	4.1 (10)	0.0 (0.0)	0.0 (0.0)	0.0 (0.0)	0.0 (0.0)	0.0 (0.0)	0.2 (0.51)	3.4 (8.6)	15.9 (40)	74.0 (188)
Average precipitation days (≥ 0.01 in)	9.8	7.9	8.9	10.1	11.4	12.2	11.4	10.9	9.1	11.1	9.8	11.2	123.8
Average snowy days (≥ 0.1 in)	6.8	5.9	4.1	1.1	0.0	0.0	0.0	0.0	0.0	0.1	2.0	5.6	25.6
Source 1: NOAA
Source 2: National Weather Service

== Demographics ==
Historical population
Census	Pop.	Note	%±
1810	686		—
1820	881		28.4%
1830	1,272		44.4%
1840	1,701		33.7%
1850	1,769		4.0%
1860	1,615		−8.7%
1870	1,401		−13.3%
1880	1,315		−6.1%
1890	1,815		38.0%
1900	2,764		52.3%
1910	3,379		22.3%
1920	3,700		9.5%
1930	3,956		6.9%
1940	3,836		−3.0%
1950	3,639		−5.1%
1960	3,935		8.1%
1970	4,278		8.7%
1980	4,367		2.1%
1990	4,725		8.2%
2000	4,523		−4.3%
2010	4,855		7.3%
2020	4,726		−2.7%
U.S. Decennial Census

=== 2010 census ===
As of the census of 2010, there were 4,855 people, 1,976 households, and 1,271 families living in the town. The population density was 93.6 inhabitants per square mile (36.1/km^{2}). There were 2,478 housing units at an average density of 47.8 per square mile (18.5/km^{2}). The racial makeup of the town was 97.5% White, 0.4% African American, 0.6% Native American, 0.4% Asian, and 1.1% from two or more races. Hispanic or Latino of any race were 0.9% of the population.

There were 1,976 households, of which 27.7% had children under the age of 18 living with them, 49.1% were married couples living together, 9.9% had a female householder with no husband present, 5.3% had a male householder with no wife present, and 35.7% were non-families. 28.9% of all households were made up of individuals, and 13.5% had someone living alone who was 65 years of age or older. The average household size was 2.32 and the average family size was 2.82.

The median age in the town was 44 years. 20.8% of residents were under the age of 18; 6.4% were between the ages of 18 and 24; 24.2% were from 25 to 44; 30.6% were from 45 to 64; and 18.2% were 65 years of age or older. The gender makeup of the town was 50.6% male and 49.4% female.

=== 2000 census ===
As of the census of 2000, there were 4,523 people, 1,890 households, and 1,270 families living in the town. The population density was 87.4 inhabitants per square mile (33.7/km^{2}). There were 2,308 housing units at an average density of 44.6 per square mile (17.2/km^{2}). The racial makeup of the town was 98.12% White, 0.07% Black or African American, 0.29% Native American, 0.15% Asian, 0.02% Pacific Islander, 0.07% from other races, and 1.28% from two or more races. Hispanic or Latino of any race were 0.22% of the population.

There were 1,890 households, out of which 28.1% had children under the age of 18 living with them, 53.1% were married couples living together, 10.3% had a female householder with no husband present, and 32.8% were non-families. 27.6% of all households were made up of individuals, and 13.7% had someone living alone who was 65 years of age or older. The average household size was 2.33 and the average family size was 2.79.

In the town, the population was spread out, with 22.2% under the age of 18, 5.3% from 18 to 24, 27.7% from 25 to 44, 25.2% from 45 to 64, and 19.5% who were 65 years of age or older. The median age was 42 years. For every 100 females, there were 89.7 males. For every 100 females age 18 and over, there were 86.3 males.

The median income for a household in the town was $30,528, and the median income for a family was $36,750. Males had a median income of $30,179 versus $20,827 for females. The per capita income for the town was $16,698. About 9.3% of families and 13.7% of the population were below the poverty line, including 20.9% of those under age 18 and 11.1% of those age 65 or over.

== Education ==
Madison is part of Maine School Administrative District 59. Schools in the district include Madison Elementary School, Madison Jr. High School and Madison High School.

The Skowhegan School of Painting and Sculpture is an artists residency located in Madison, just outside of Skowhegan.

== Notable people ==
- Robert A. Rushworth, USAF Maj Gen and X-15 test pilot
- Carrie Stevens, inventor of the Grey Ghost fly lure
- Bobby Wilder, football head coach, Old Dominion
