= Backyard Farms =

American agricultural company

Backyard Farms is an agricultural company, based in Madison, Maine, United States, specializing in massive greenhouses to produce vine-ripened tomatoes.

It had been owned by Devonshire Investors, a Boston-based branch of Fidelity Investments but was sold in June 2017 to a Canadian produce company, Mastronardi Produce of Ontario.

== History ==
The company was started in 2004. In 2007, the company's first 25-acre (100,000 m^{2}) greenhouse was built in Madison, Maine, making it the largest building by volume in the state. It covers the area of 20 football fields. The 240,000 plants grow up to 10 feet tall and are projected to yield 1 million tomatoes each week. The company also harvested its first tomatoes that year.

Their second greenhouse, connected to the first, was built in 2009. The combined area was then 42 acres (170,000 m^{2}).

In 2017, Canadian produce company Mastronardi Produce acquired Backyard Farms.

== Greenhouse operations ==
Backyard Farms grows tomatoes year-round in two greenhouses covering 42 acres in Madison. Backyard Farms grows tomatoes on the vine, cocktail tomatoes and beefsteak tomatoes year-round. Its tomatoes are distributed to grocery retailers across the Northeast, including Hannaford, Whole Foods, Walmart and Shaw’s.

Plants are grown in rock wool and pollinated by bumblebees that are kept inside the greenhouses. Rainwater that sheds off the greenhouse roofs is recycled to supplement the water used to irrigate the plants. The plants are grown hydroponically, using nutrient-enriched water rather than soil.

Although the tomatoes originally had been a specialty variety called "Backyard Beauty", they had been replaced with other, undisclosed varieties. There had been plans for the operation to expand to include peppers, eggplants, cucumbers, herbs, and strawberries.
