= Woods Theatre =

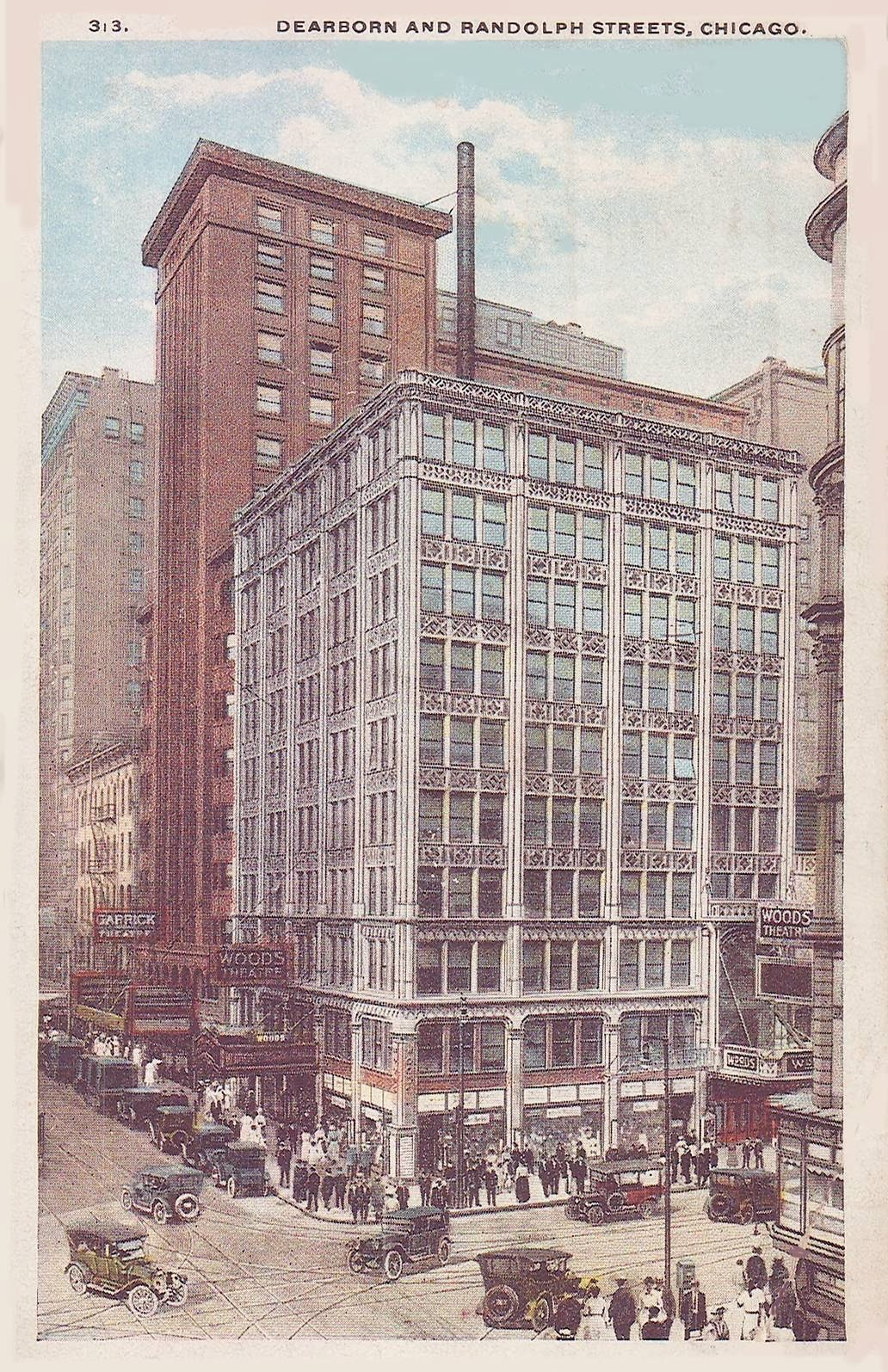
- Woods Theatre in 1922
- Interactive map of Woods Theatre
- Address: 54 West Randolph Street; Chicago; United States
- Coordinates: 41.8848°N 87.6299°W
- Owner: The Shubert Organization
- Capacity: 1100
- Current use: Goodman Theatre Center

Construction
- Opened: March 28, 1918
- Closed: January 8, 1989
- Demolished: 1990
- Architect: Marshall and Fox

The Woods Theatre was a movie palace at the corner of Randolph and Dearborn Streets in the Chicago Loop. It opened in 1918 and was a popular entertainment destination for decades. Originally a venue for live theater, it was later converted to show movies. It closed in 1989 and was demolished in 1990.

== History ==
=== Live theater ===
The Woods Theatre was built by theatrical producer Albert H. Woods. He had opened the Eltinge Theatre in New York City to host his Broadway productions, and wanted a similar venue in Chicago for his road companies. The Woods opened on March 11, 1918, with a production of Friendly Enemies. It was designed in a Neo-Gothic style by the firm Marshall and Fox, which also designed such still-extant Chicago structures as the Blackstone Theatre (later renamed the Merle Reskin Theatre) and the Drake Hotel. The ten-story building included the theater at the ground level and offices above.

=== Movie theater ===
The Woods converted to show movies in 1932. It later became the flagship venue for Essaness Theatres, which moved its headquarters into the building. Starting in the 1950s, the building featured an unusually large marquee facing Dearborn Street. The facade and its marquee can be seen in the parade scene of the 1986 film Ferris Bueller's Day Off.

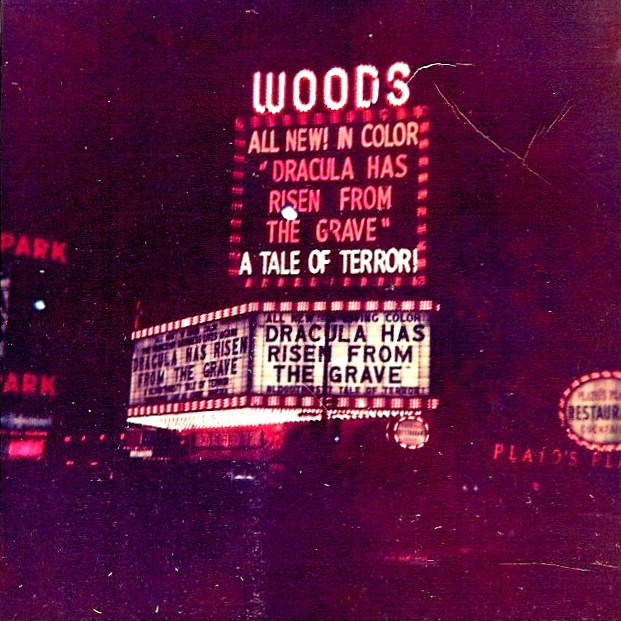
Woods Theatre in 1970

In its later years the quality of the venue declined. In 1982, the management had to pay for medical treatments when a patron was bitten by a rat during a show. By 1988, the Woods had become the last of the Chicago Loop movie houses. It closed on January 8, 1989, after a screening of Hellbound: Hellraiser II.

=== Demolition ===
After being considered for entry in the National Register of Historic Places, it was demolished in 1990. The demolition was part of a controversial urban renewal project. Beginning with the demolition of the Garrick Theatre on Randolph, many of Chicago's classic theaters were demolished either because of disuse or disrepair. The Woods was located on the parcel directly northwest of the controversial Block 37, which once housed the Roosevelt and United Artists theaters. The site of the Harris and Selwyn (later Cinestage and Michael Todd, then Dearborn Cinemas) is now occupied by the Goodman Theatre Center. Block 37, which remained vacant until 2005, is southeast of the Goodman site.

== Premieres ==
Movies that held their premieres at the Woods Theatre included:

- The Big Sky (August 6, 1952)
- The Moon Is Blue (June 22, 1953)
- Monkey on My Back (May 14, 1957)
- It's Alive (April 26, 1974)
