= Louis Mann =

American actor

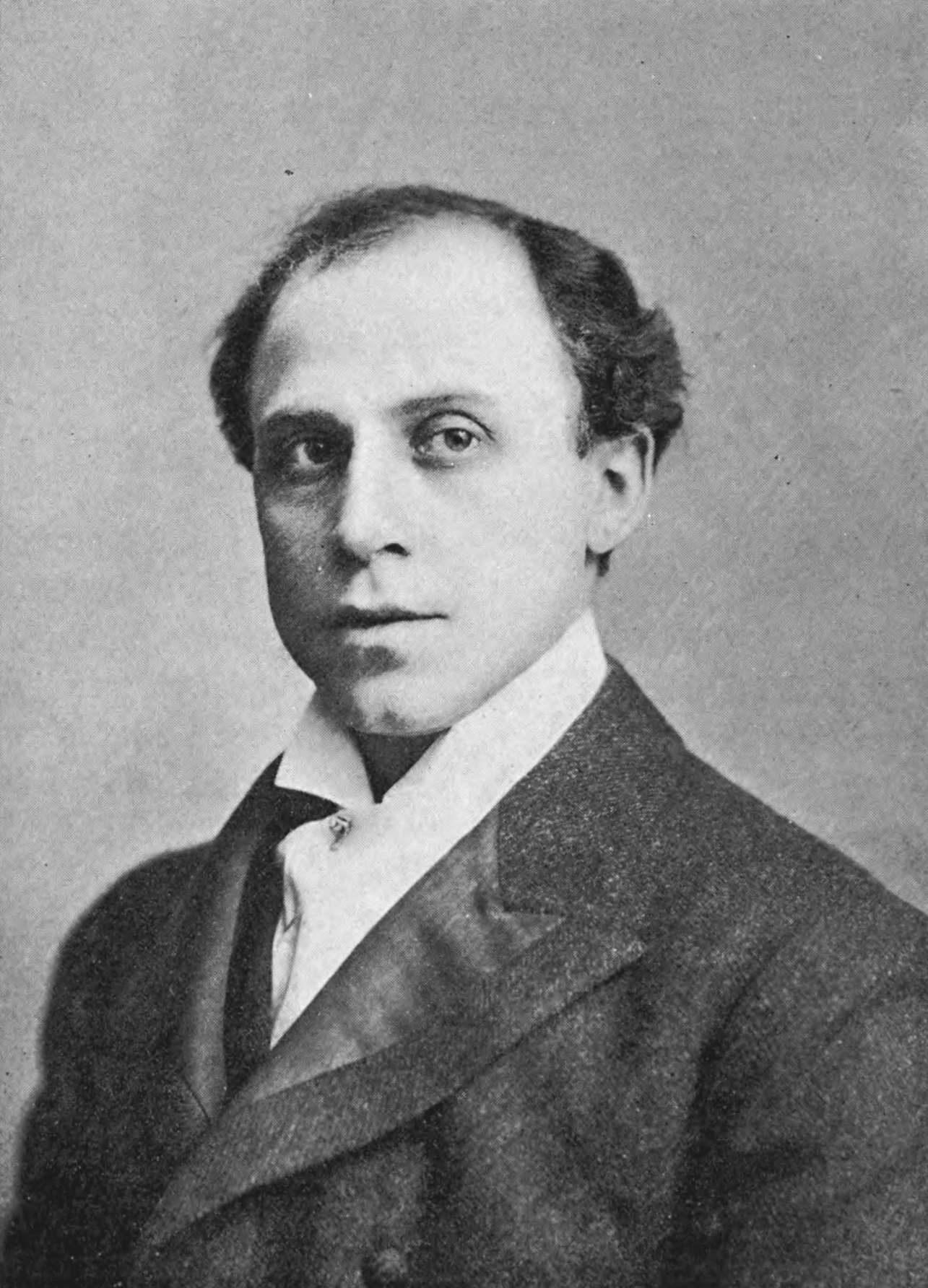
- Mann in 1901
- Born: April 20, 1865; New York City, U.S.
- Died: February 15, 1931 (aged 65); New York City, U.S.
- Occupations: Actor, director
- Years active: 1916–1922
- Spouse: Clara Lipman
- Relatives: Nathaniel Mann (brother)

Louis Mann (20 April 1865 – 15 February 1931) was an American theatre actor and sometime director, who in his later life made a few appearances in motion pictures. He was married to actress and playwright Clara Lipman.

== History ==
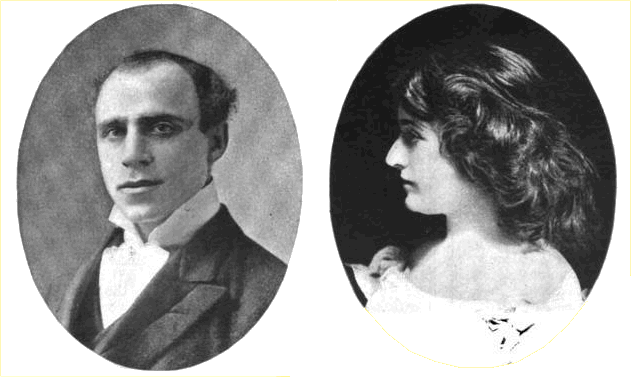
Louis Mann and his wife Clara Lipman in 1901.

Mann was born in New York City in 1865 to Daniel and Caroline Mann, and made his first theatrical appearances as a child actor, mainly in German-language theatricals. In 1896 he appeared in the Herald Square Theatre on Broadway, in the George Dance and Ivan Caryll production The Girl from Paris. He played Hans Nix to Clara Lipman's Estelle Cookoo in the 1897 Morton-Kerker musical comedy The Telephone Girl, and in 1899, the two appeared in the original run of the farce The Girl in the Barracks. Mann and Lipman took the leads, and were well received. Mann continued appearing in original stage comedies, and in 1903 produced his own Broadway production, Charles Nirdlinger's The Consul at the Princess Theatre on 29th Street. The play had a short run, and in the later half of 1903, Mann appeared in Weber and Fields low comedy musical Whoop-Dee-Doo at the Weber and Fields' Broadway Music Hall.

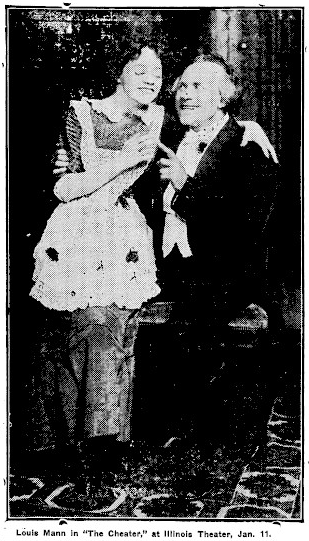
Louis Mann in "The Cheater," 1911

In 1906, Mann appeared in his wife's play Julie Bonbon, which opened at Lew M. Field Theatre, New York. He appeared in all five of his wife's works, staging her final piece Nature's Nobleman. By 1914, Mann appeared in his first moving picture, Giles Warren's Your Girl and Mine: A Woman Suffrage Play. In 1918 Mann appeared in his most notable role, that of Karl Pfeifer, in Aaron Hoffman's stage play Friendly Enemies. His most notable film role was The Sins of the Children (1930) opposite Robert Montgomery and Leila Hyams.

His brothers were also in show business: Sam Mann was a comic actor and Nathaniel Mann was a theatrical composer and songwriter.
