= The Telephone Girl (musical) =

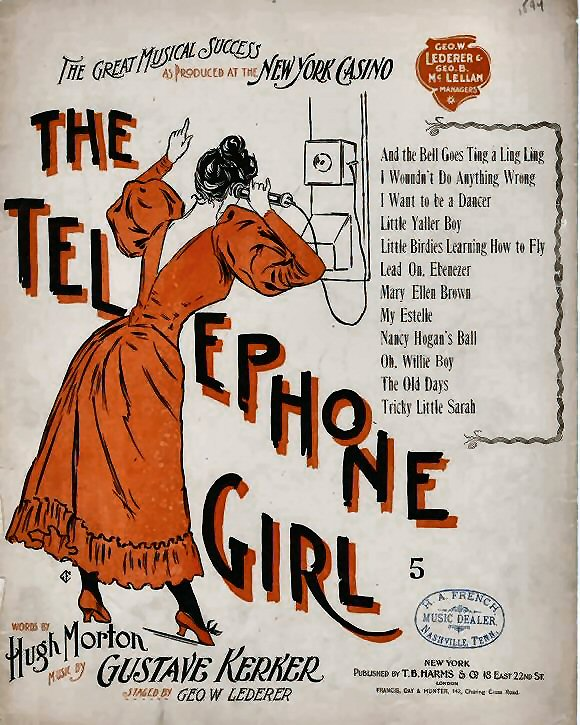
New York Public Library Digital Gallery

The Telephone Girl is a farce musical comedy by C. M. S. McLellan (as Hugh Morton), with music by composer Gustave Kerker. The play made its New York debut at the Casino Theatre under the direction of George W. Lederer on December 27, 1897. Though not a favorite with the critics, The Telephone Girl would go on to have a successful run at the Casino and do well on subsequent road tours. The original New York cast starred Clara Lipman as ‘Estelle Cookoo’ and her real life husband, Louis Mann, as 'Hans Nix', roles assumed by Mabel Hite and Harry Hermsen two years later during an extensive road tour of North America.

== Plot ==
The Telephone Girl’ was taken from a French farce by Antony Mars and Maurice Desvallières, and revolves around a misunderstanding that occurs after Estelle Cookoo, a young French telephone operator, overhears a conversation between her boyfriend, Hans Nix, and a music hall actress he once knew.

== Reception ==
The New York Times

The Telephone Girl seemed courser and more vicious than any of its recent predecessors, but the seeming was largely due to the ineptness of the thing, its patches of dullness and deficiency of skill and charm in the performance.

The Lima News

The Telephone Girl is one of his latest efforts in his peculiar line, and as seen last night it would seem that the gentleman (McLellan) has nearly reached the limit of the public’s tolerance of his Indecencies

Lebanon Daily News

At the Academy Wednesday Evening the medley is one of the most amusing sent from the New York Casino, and Louis Mann and Clara Lipman have won distinct favor in it.

== Original New York Cast ==
Source: A History of the New York Stage by T. Allston Brown

- Dick Marvel.. Edward Abeles
- Velasquez.. Henry Bergman
- Ebeneezer.. Nicholas Burnham
- Mrs. Puffaway.. Rosa Cooke
- Col. William Goldtop.. Charles Dickson
- Saunders.. Benjamin T. Dillon
- Estelle Coocoo.. Clara Lipman
- Hans Nix.. Louis Mann
- Snuffles.. James F. McDonald
- Samanthy Fairfax.. Sarah McVicker
