= Fast Life (1929 film) =

1929 film

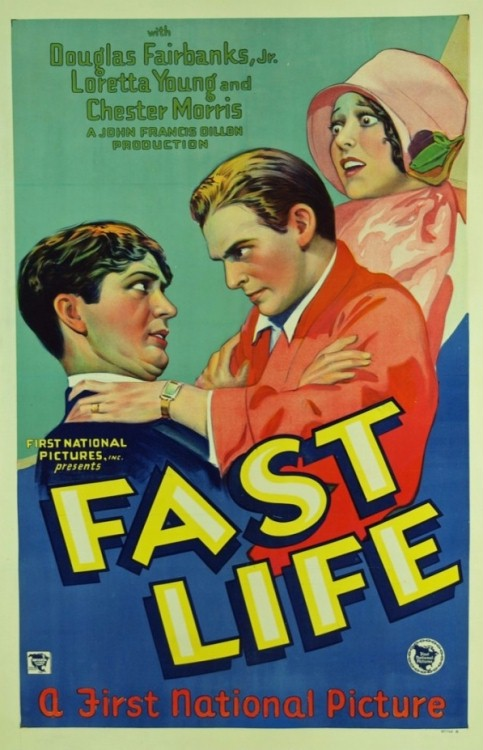
- Theatrical release poster
- Directed by: John Francis Dillon
- Screenplay by: John F. Goodrich
- Based on: Fast Life; 1928 play by: Samuel Shipman; John B. Hymer
- Produced by: Richard A. Rowland
- Starring: Douglas Fairbanks Jr. Loretta Young; William Holden; Frank Sheridan; Chester Morris; Ray Hallor
- Cinematography: Faxon M. Dean
- Edited by: Ralph Holt
- Production company: First National Pictures
- Distributed by: Warner Bros. Pictures
- Release date: September 1, 1929
- Running time: 80 minutes
- Country: United States
- Language: English

Fast Life is a 1929 American pre-Code drama film directed by John Francis Dillon and written by John F. Goodrich. It is based on the 1928 play Fast Life by Samuel Shipman and John B. Hymer. The film stars Douglas Fairbanks Jr., Loretta Young, William Holden, Frank Sheridan, Chester Morris, and Ray Hallor. The film was released by Warner Bros. Pictures on September 1, 1929.

== Plot ==
A man is tried and convicted for the murder of a man who flirted with his wife and sentenced to death However, it turns out that he is innocent of the murder and that the real killer has close ties to a powerful politician.

== Cast ==
- Douglas Fairbanks Jr. as Douglas Stratton
- Loretta Young as Patricia Mason Stratton
- William Holden as Governor
- Frank Sheridan as Warden
- Chester Morris as Paul Palmer
- Ray Hallor as Rodney Hall
- John St. Polis as Andrew Stratton
- Purnell Pratt as Berton Hall

== Music ==
The film featured a theme song entitled "Since I Found You" which was composed by Ray Perkins (music) and Herman Ruby (lyrics). Also featured on the soundtrack is a song entitled "A Fast Life And A Hot One" by the same composers.

== Censorship ==
When Fast Life was released, many states and cities in the United States had censor boards that could require cuts or other eliminations before the film could be shown. While the Chicago Board of Censors may not have required any cuts, it passed the film with a pink ticket, or "adults only", while showing at the Oriental Theatre. The restricted film, however, gave the theatre then highest gross for the week for those on the Chicago Loop, taking in $48,500.

== Preservation ==
This film is now lost. Its Vitaphone soundtrack survives.

== See also ==
- List of early sound feature films (1926–1929)
