= John B. Hymer =

American actor, playwright (1875–1953)

John Bard Hymer
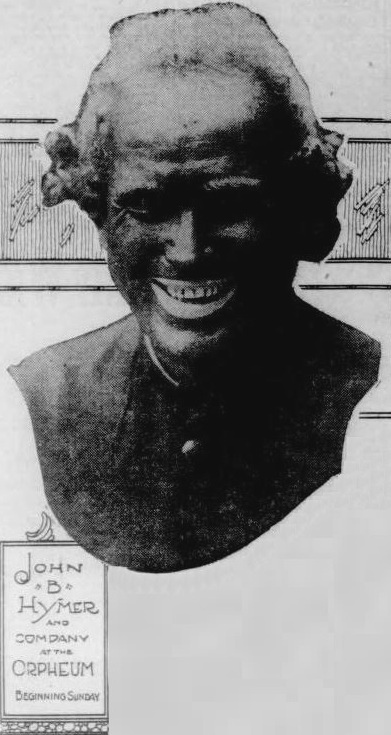
- John B. Hymer in an advertisement for Tom Walker in Dixie (c. 1919)
- Born: December 19, 1875; Kentucky, U.S.
- Died: June 17, 1953 (aged 77); Los Angeles, California, U.S.
- Spouse: Eleanor Kent (m. )
- Children: 2, including Warren Hymer

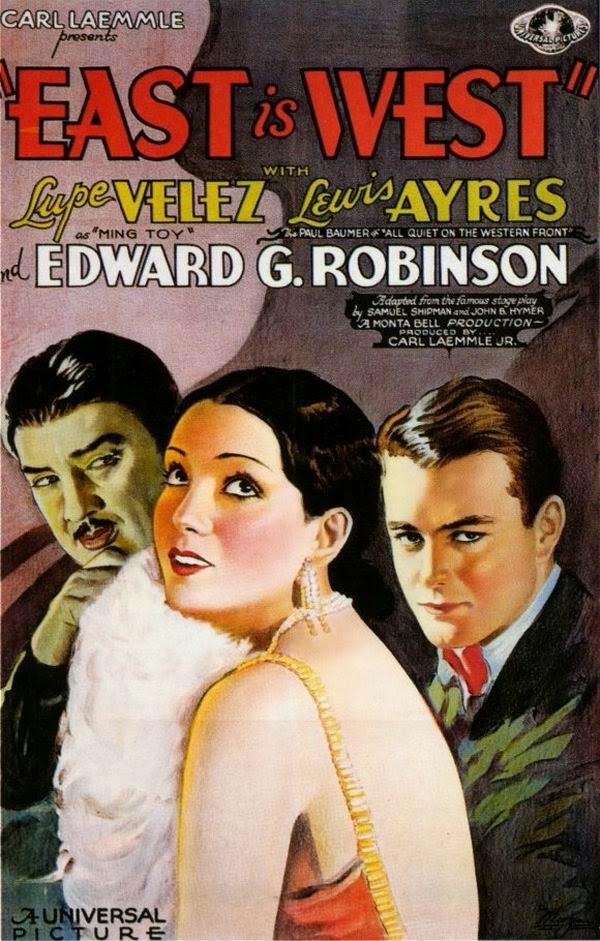
Poster for East Is West (1930)

John Bard Hymer (1875 – 1953) was an American playwright and actor, from Kentucky and active in Los Angeles. He was known for his blackface vaudeville and stage performances, most notably in The Clansman (1906), 'Ostler Joe (c. 1912), and the Tom Walker series which included Tom Walker in Dixie (1919). Hymer was a prominent member of the Lakewood Theater colony in Maine. His touring stock company was John B. Hymer and Co..

== Life and career ==
John Bard Hymer was born on December 19, 1875, in Kentucky, U.S.. In his childhood in the summer, his family would live in Maine. He started acting at age 14.

His wife Eleanor Kent was an actress, and they had two children. Their son Warren Hymer became a film actor.

Hymer collaborated with Samuel Shipman on plays including East is West (1918), which was twice adapted to film. They also worked together on Crime and Scarlet Pages, which was also adapted to film.

In 1906 he had an acting part in The Clansman play. He and his stock company performed in 1920, Tom Walker in Dixie in Sacramento, California. The Harvard Crimson reviewed one of his collaborations with LeRoy Clemens in 1925.

The Colony House (1929) in the Lakewood Theatre Colony in Maine was built for Hymer.

Hymer died of muscular dystrophy in 1953, in Los Angeles.

== Theater ==
- The Clansman (1906)
- 'Ostler Joe (c. 1912)
- East Is West (1918)
- The Devil and Tom Walker
- Tom Walker on Mars
- Tom Walker in Dixie (1919)
- Aloma of the South Seas (1925) with LeRoy Clemens
- Alias the Deacon (1925)
- Crime (1927)
- Fast Life (1928)
- Scarlet Pages (1929)
- Happy Landing (1932)
- A Lady Detained (1935)

== Filmography ==
- East Is West (1922), as writer with Samuel Shipman
- Aloma of the South Seas (1926), as writer with LeRoy Clemens
- Alias the Deacon (1927), as writer with LeRoy Clemens
- Fast Life (1929), as writer with Samuel Shipman
- East Is West (1930), as writer with Samuel Shipman
- Scarlet Pages (1930), as writer with Samuel Shipman
- Aloma of the South Seas (1941), as writer with Samuel Shipman
