= East Is West (1922 film) =

1922 film by Sidney Franklin

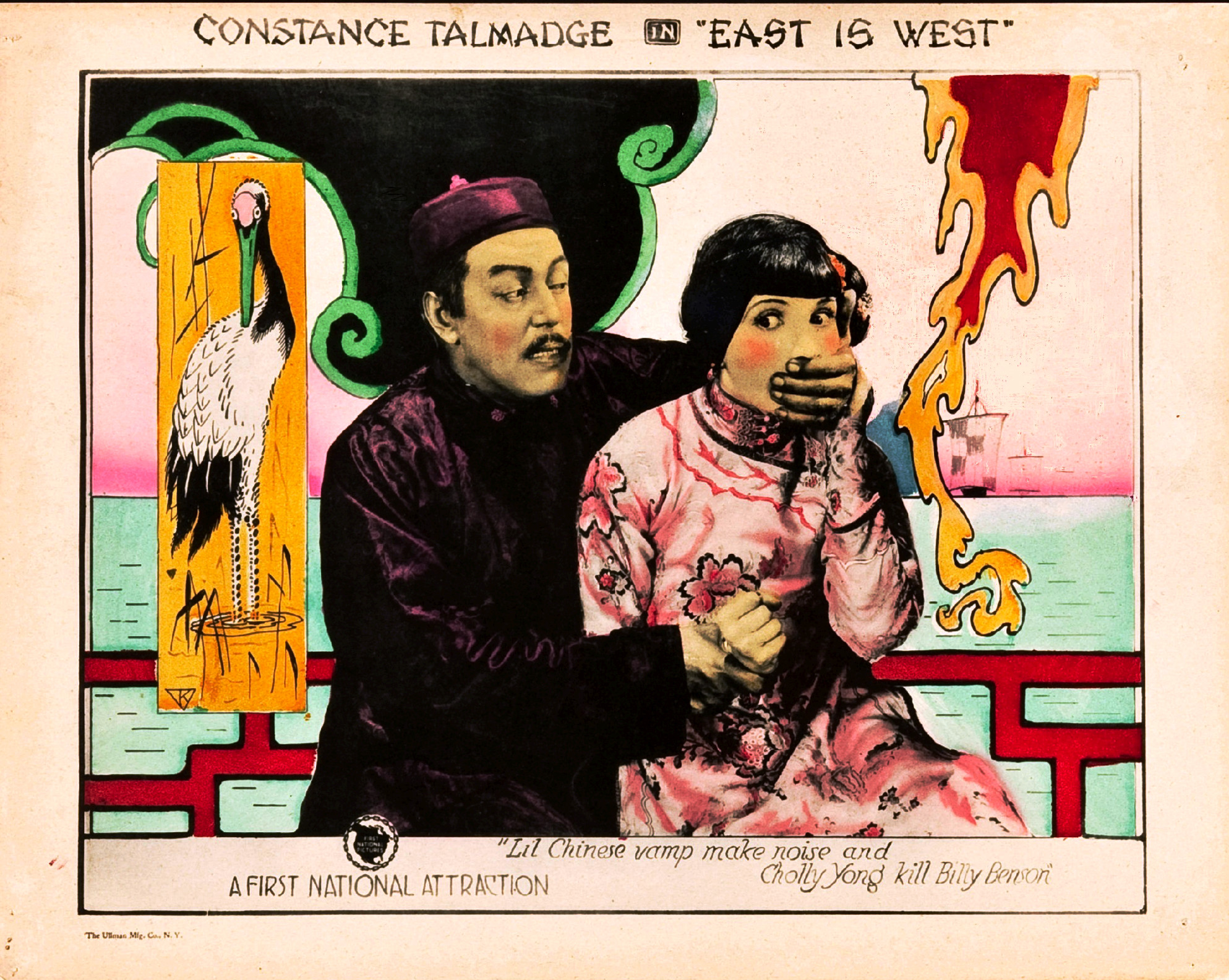
- Lobby card
- Directed by: Sidney Franklin
- Written by: Frances Marion
- Based on: East Is West by John B. Hymer and Samuel Shipman
- Produced by: Constance Talmadge
- Starring: Constance Talmadge
- Cinematography: Tony Gaudio
- Distributed by: Associated First National
- Release date: November 15, 1922
- Running time: 80 minutes
- Country: United States
- Language: Silent (English intertitles)
- Budget: $390,000

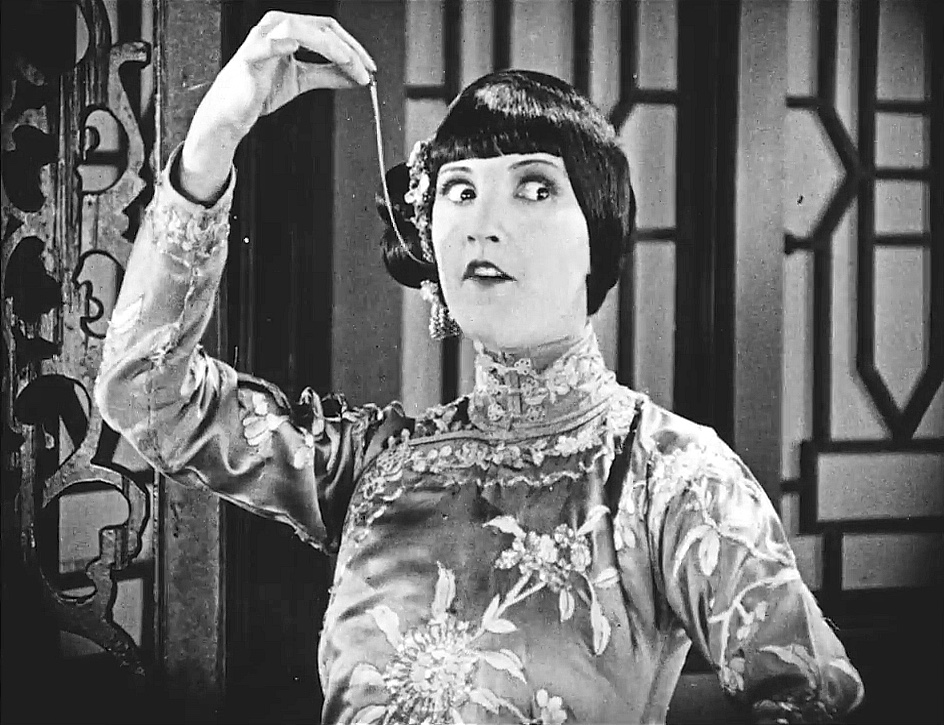
Constance Talmadge

East Is West is a 1922 American silent drama film directed by Sidney Franklin and starring Constance Talmadge, Edmund Burns, and E. Alyn Warren. The film is based on a 1918 Broadway stage play of the same name starring Fay Bainter as Ming Toy. It was remade as a talkie at Universal in 1930 with Lupe Vélez.

== Cast ==
- Constance Talmadge as Ming Toy
- Edmund Burns as Billy Benson (credited as Edward Burns)
- E. Alyn Warren as Lo Sang Kee (credited as E.A. Warren)
- Warner Oland as Charley Yong
- Frank Lanning as Hop Toy
- Nick De Ruiz as Chang Lee
- Nigel Barrie as Jimmy Potter
- Lillian Lawrence as Mrs. Benson
- Winter Hall as Mr. Benson
- James Wang as Boat Proprietor (credited as Jim Wang)
- Etta Lee (uncredited)

== Preservation ==
A copy of East Is West is held at the EYE Film Institute Netherlands, formerly Filmmuseum Nederlands.
