= Scarlet Pages =

1930 film

- Lobby poster
- Directed by: Ray Enright
- Written by: Maude Fulton (dialogue)
- Screenplay by: Walter Anthony
- Based on: Scarlet Pages by Samuel Shipman and John B. Hymer
- Starring: Elsie Ferguson; John Halliday; Grant Withers; Marian Nixon
- Cinematography: William Rees
- Edited by: George Marks
- Music by: Erno Rapee; Louis Silvers
- Production company: First National Pictures
- Distributed by: Warner Bros. Pictures
- Release date: September 28, 1930 (United States)
- Running time: 66 minutes
- Country: United States
- Language: English

Full film

Scarlet Pages is a 1930 pre-Code American crime drama film with songs starring Elsie Ferguson and directed by Ray Enright. It was produced and distributed by First National Pictures, a subsidiary of Warner Bros. Pictures. The film stars Elsie Ferguson, John Halliday, Grant Withers and Marian Nixon. Scarlet Pages is based on a 1929 Broadway play of the same name that Ferguson also starred in. It is similar in theme to the better remembered Five Star Final, also by Warners released a year later. The film simultaneously marked the first time Ferguson appeared in a sound film and the last film she ever made.

== Plot ==
In 1911, being unable to care for her baby, Mary Bancroft, had to give her up for adoption. Years later, in 1930, Bancroft is now a successful lawyer in New York. She refuses to marry District Attorney John Remington, because she doesn't want to tell him about her unfortunate past.

Bancroft and Remington go to a nightclub one night where Nora Mason works as a singer and dancer. Nora Mason is actually Bancroft's biological daughter but neither of them knows it. Although Nora is tired of the work she is doing and wants to settle down and marry Robert Lawrence, her adoptive "father" Dr. Henry Mason has other plans for her. Dr. Mason wants to sell Nora to Gregory Jackson, who promises to star Nora in a lucrative show, as long as she gives herself to Jackson.

When Nora hears of this sordid deal from the lips of Dr. Mason, she kills him with a gun her adoptive "mother" has recently bought. Lawrence, with a friend who is an acquaintance of Bancroft's, goes to the office of Bancroft to ask her to defend Nora. At first reluctant, Bancroft finally decides to take the case. Nora at first refuses to tell the reasons for killing her adoptive father Dr. Mason until it comes out in court that she has been adopted. Nora then informs the jury the entire details of what had occurred prior to the murder; it is obliquely stated that she had been molested by Dr. Mason. When Bancroft finds out her client is actually her own daughter she passes out in court. Nora is acquitted and eventually forgives her real mother for abandoning her as a child.

== Cast ==
- Elsie Ferguson as Mary Bancroft
- Marian Nixon as Nora Mason
- John Halliday as District Attorney John Remington
- Grant Withers as Robert Lawrence
- Daisy Belmore as Miss Isobel Kennedy
- William B. Davidson as Gregory Jackson
- Jean Laverty as Carlotta Cortez
- Wilbur Mack as Mr. Henry Mason
- Charlotte Walker as Mrs. Mason
- Neely Edwards as Barnes
- Helen Ferguson as Miss Hutchinson (Mary's secretary)
- Fred Kelsey as James Murphy
- Lucy Beaumont as Martha, Mary's housekeeper (uncredited)

== Songs ==
- "I'm Walking on Air" Sung by Marian Nixon and Chorus (written by Archie Gottler and George W. Meyer)

== Preservation ==
The film survives intact and has been preserved from Associated Artists Productions (AAP/UA). It has been released on DVD by the Warner Archive Collection. A copy is held by the Library of Congress.
