= Friendly Enemies (1925 film) =

1925 film

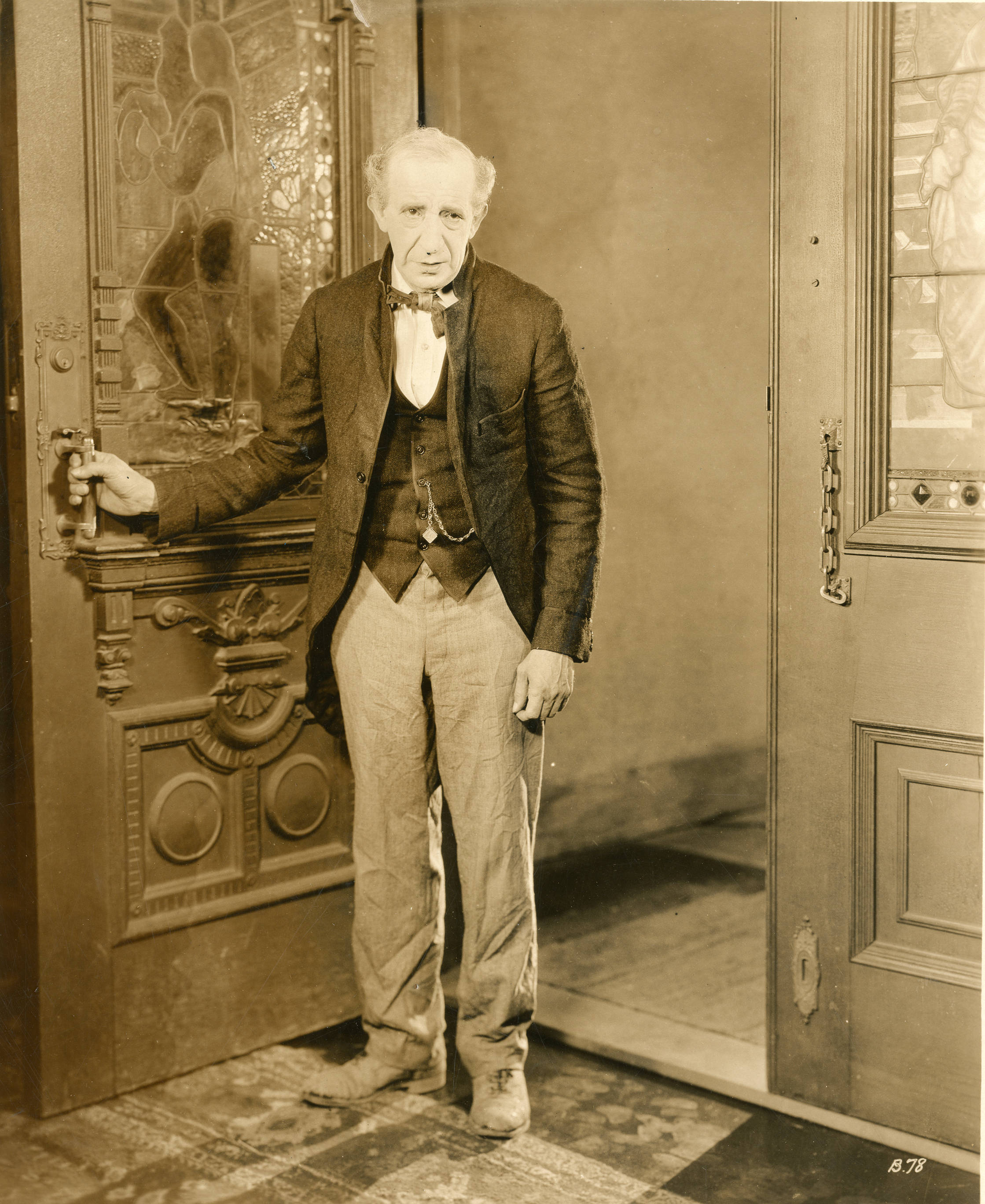
- Still with Lew Fields
- Directed by: George Melford
- Written by: Alfred A. Cohn; Josephine Quirk
- Based on: Friendly Enemies by Aaron Hoffman and Samuel Shipman
- Produced by: David Belasco
- Starring: Joe Weber; Lew Fields; Virginia Brown Faire
- Cinematography: Charles G. Clarke
- Production company: Belasco Productions
- Distributed by: Producers Distributing Corporation
- Release date: March 16, 1925
- Running time: 70 minutes
- Country: United States
- Language: Silent (English intertitles)

Friendly Enemies is a 1925 American silent comedy thriller film directed by George Melford and starring Joe Weber, Lew Fields and Virginia Brown Faire. It is based on a 1918 play of the same title, and was part of a cluster of World War I-themed films released during the mid-1920s. It was remade as a sound film Friendly Enemies in 1942.

== Plot ==
Two German immigrants have thrived in the United States. However, when World War I erupts, Carl Pfeiffer maintains his sympathy for the German Empire, even after the U.S. enters the conflict. Despite his friend's unwavering loyalty to America, Pfeiffer offers financial support and aid to a German espionage ring. Unknowingly, he assists them in planning the sabotage of a troopship that his own son is boarding to fight on the Western Front. Pfeiffer experiences a profound change of heart and, with the aid of his friend and American intelligence services, he successfully foils the plot and apprehends the enemy spy ring.

== Cast ==
- Joe Weber as Henry Block
- Lew Fields as Carl Pfeiffer
- Eugenie Besserer as Mrs. Marie Pfeiffer
- Virginia Brown Faire as June Block
- Jack Mulhall as William Pfeiffer
- Fred Kelsey as Adolph
- Stuart Holmes as Miller
- Lucille Lee Stewart as Hilda Schwartz
- Nora Hayden as Nora
- Jules Hanft as Frederick Schnitzler

== Preservation ==
With no prints of Friendly Enemies located in any film archives, it is a lost film.

== Bibliography ==
- Parish, James Robert & Pitts, Michael R. The Great Spy Pictures. Scarecrow Press, 1974. ISBN 0-8108-0655-X.
