= Friendly Enemies (1942 film) =

1942 film by Allan Dwan

- Directed by: Allan Dwan
- Written by: Aaron Hoffman and Samuel Shipman (play); Adelaide Heilbron (screenplay)
- Produced by: Edward Small
- Starring: Charles Winninger; Charlie Ruggles; James Craig; Nancy Kelly
- Edited by: Grant Whytock
- Production company: Edward Small Productions
- Distributed by: United Artists
- Release date: June 21, 1942
- Running time: 95 minutes
- Country: United States
- Language: English

Friendly Enemies is a 1942 American drama film starring Charles Winninger, Charlie Ruggles, James Craig, and Nancy Kelly. The film was directed by Allan Dwan, adapted from a 1918 play of the same name by Aaron Hoffman and Samuel Shipman. It was nominated an Academy Award in the category of Best Sound Recording (Jack Whitney).

== Plot ==
A New York City brewer by the name of Karl Pfeiffer takes a stand against President Wilson's decision to send troops to Europe to support the Allies in World War I. Karl is a native German who doesn't want his birthplace destroyed in the war.

Trying to find another way to help stop the war, Karl is an easy target for the cunning saboteur Anton Miller. Miller meets Karl posing as propaganda expert named George Stewart, and can persuades Karl to donate $50,000 to the cause of stopping the war. The check will be ready for picking up the day after at Karl's home on Manhattan. That same evening Karl attends a dinner in honor of Henry Block, who is the father of June, who is about to marry Karl's son. When it comes to politics, Henry's views are opposite of Karl's and they often start to argue when they meet.

Because of Karl's views and bad temper the rest of the family have kept it a secret that his son William has joined the Army. At the dinner Karl is told about this and reacts as expected with an outburst. He leaves the apartment in anger, but tries to persuade his son to change his mind the following day. Miller is interested when he hears that the famously wealthy Henry is soon to be related to Karl, and wants to meet up with him.

William stands by his decision to fight in the war, and soon he embarks with a military transport ship out of the New York City harbor. On the way to Europe the ship is sunk by saboteurs and Karl gets a message from Miller that the money he donated was well spent.

Realizing his mistake in trusting Miller, the devastated Karl decides to avenge his son by killing Miller. Henry comes to his aid, and together they come up with a plan to disclose Miller as a saboteur instead.

They arrange a meeting between Miller and Henry, at which Miller is forced to reveal his identity and is arrested by the police.

Later, it turns out that William wasn't killed when the ship sunk, and he comes home to reunite with his family and wife. Having learnt his lesson, Karl decides to give up his political beliefs and care for his family instead. The fact that he has become a true American patriot is displayed in full when he sings "My country 'tis of thee" together with his family.

== Cast ==
- Charles Winninger as Karl Pfeiffer
- Charlie Ruggles as Heinrich Block
- James Craig as Bill Pfeiffer
- Nancy Kelly as June Block
- Otto Kruger as Anton Miller
- Ilka Grüning as Mrs. Pfeiffer
- Greta Meyer as Gretchen
- Addison Richards as Inspector McCarthy
- Charles Lane as Braun
- John Piffle as Schnitzler
- Ruth Holley as Nora
- Murray Alper as Delivery man

== Production ==
The movie was based on a play which had been very popular during World War I and filmed in 1925 under the same title. Edward Small bought the rights in 1942.

According to Allan Dwan, Small approached Dwan to make a version of Up in Mabel's Room but there were difficulties with the rights. Small suggested Dwan make Friendly Enemies instead and the director was enthusiastic. Dwan claims the film only took a week to prepare because the cast and sets were already prepared for Up in Mabel's Room and repurposed and the script was very close to the play. Dwan later said

That’s what interested me about the whole project. The challenge. Not because I would ever have said, ‘Let’s go out of our way and make Friendly Enemies - or get writers and try to make it better.’ It was just ‘bang’, and it was effective. In several cases, I’ve had to do that with pictures - and not waste time or money on them, because they aren’t worth it. You don’t know what you’re going to get back out of it. In this case, he [Small] got a good profit because it turned out to be an acceptable picture.

Filming started in early February 1942.

== Reception ==
Reviews were average.

Small said he wanted to reunite the two stars in Batter Up, but the film was never made.

== Radio adaptation ==
Friendly Enemies was presented on Philip Morris Playhouse June 26, 1942. Ruggles and Winninger reprised their roles.
