= Friendly Enemies (play) =

Play by Aaron Hoffman and Samuel Shipman

- Written by: Aaron Hoffman and Samuel Shipman
- Original language: English
- Genre: Comedy, melodrama

Premiere
- Date premiered: March 11, 1918
- Place premiered: Woods Theatre

Friendly Enemies is a play written by Aaron Hoffman and Samuel Shipman. Producer Albert H. Woods made it the debut play for his Woods Theatre in Chicago, where it opened on March 11, 1918. It played successfully in Chicago for several months before Woods opened a production on Broadway at the Hudson Theatre on July 22, 1918.

== Plot ==
Henry Block and Karl Pfeifer are old friends who both immigrated to the United States from Germany. Karl's son Billy and Henry's daughter June are engaged to be married. Henry has assimilated as a patriotic American, including changing his name from Heinrich. Karl refuses to change his name and remains a German patriot. The entry of the United States into World War I against Germany creates conflict between Karl and the others. Karl is secretly giving money to Walter Stuart to fund what Karl thinks is an effort to defuse anti-German propaganda, but Stuart is actually a German agent who uses the money to fund sabotage. Billy enlists in the United States Army against Karl's wishes. When Karl discovers that his money has funded a bomb that sinks the troop transport carrying his son, he changes his position on the war. The play has a happy ending when Billy returns home, having been saved from the sinking ship.

== Cast and characters ==
The characters and cast from the Broadway production are given below:

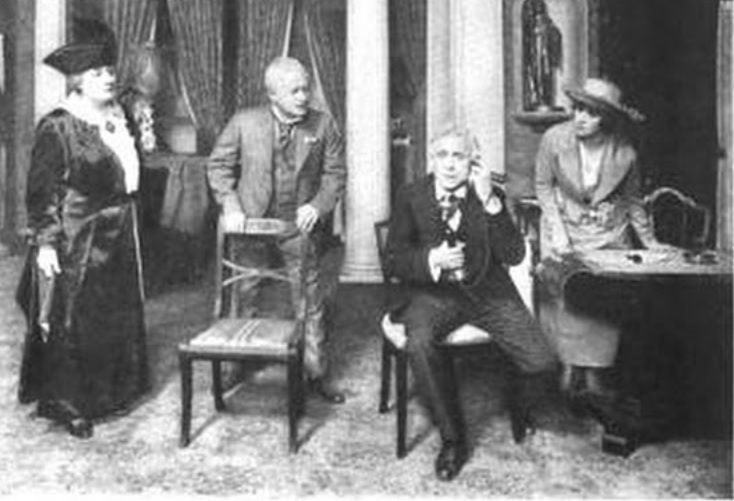
From left to right, actors Mathilde Cottrelly, Sam Bernard, Louis Mann, and Regina Wallace on the set of Friendly Enemies

Cast of the Broadway production
| Character | Broadway cast |
|---|---|
| William Pfeifer | Richard Barbee |
| Henry Block | Sam Bernard |
| Marie Pfeifer | Mathilde Cottrelly |
| Walter Stuart | Felix Krembs |
| Karl Pfeifer | Louis Mann |
| Nora | Natalie Manning |
| June Block | Regina Wallace |

== Reception ==
Although a few critics thought the play was too positive in its portrayal of the pro-German position, it generally received positive reviews.

Dorothy Parker gave the play a positive review in Vanity Fair's October 1918 issue, saying: "Friendly Enemies... is simply driving them wild over at the Hudson Theatre. The audience just can't contain itself. The propaganda is so coated with humor that you've taken it before you can stop and think about it. Every time you begin to feel that it would be rather considerate if they'd turn off the war talk for just a moment, please, and talk about something else, the authors put in a line that gets a laugh, and so the audience has the time of its life."

== Adaptations ==
The play was adapted to film twice, first in 1925 and then in 1942, with both versions retaining the title Friendly Enemies. The 1925 adaptation was a black and white silent film directed by George Melford. The 1942 adaptation was a black and white sound film directed by Allan Dwan.
