= Percival Wilde =

American dramatist

- Born: March 1, 1887; New York City, US
- Died: September 19, 1953 (aged 66); New York, US
- Occupations: Playwright, writer
- Writing career
- Genres: Detective fiction, Comedy
- Notable work: Inquest (1938)

Percival Wilde (New York City, March 1, 1887 – September 19, 1953) was an American author and playwright who wrote novels and numerous short stories and one-act plays. He also authored a textbook on the theater arts. Native to New York City, Wilde graduated from Columbia University in 1906, and worked for a time as a banker. He began writing plays in 1912, and joined The Lambs Club in 1947.

Wilde's plays were especially popular in the Little Theatre Movement.

== List of works ==
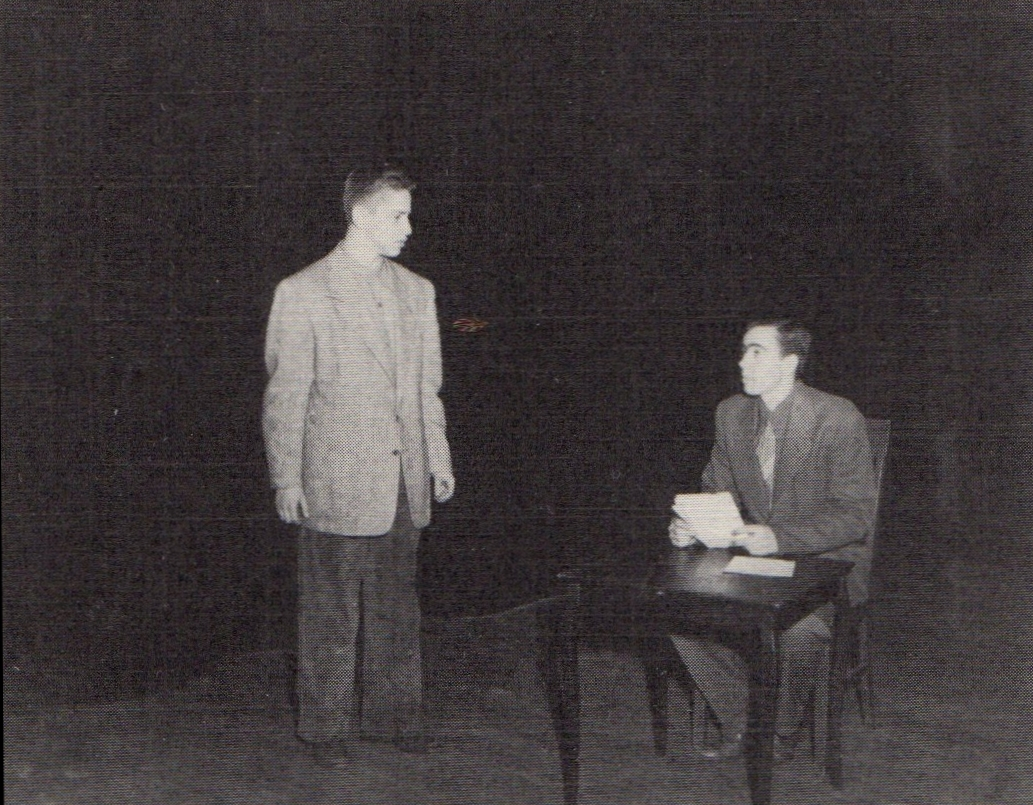
Production of The Finger of God at Shimer College in 1952.

=== Novels ===
- The Devil's Booth (1930)
- Mystery Week-End (1938)
- Inquest (1938)
- Design for Murder (1941)
- Tinsley's Bones (1942)

=== Collections of short stories ===
- Rogues in Clover (1929)
- P. Moran, Operative (1947)

=== Plays ===
- Dawn and One Act Plays Of Life Today (1915) ISBN 978-0-548-52580-7
  - Dawn
  - The Hour of Truth
  - The Noble Lord
  - The Traitor
  - A House of Cards
  - Playing With Fire
  - The Finger of God
- Confessional, and Other American Plays (1916)
  - Confessional
  - The Beautiful Story ISBN 978-1-4254-7780-6
  - The Villain in the Piece ISBN 978-1-4254-7777-6
  - A Question of Morality ISBN 978-1-4254-7779-0
  - According to Darwin ISBN 978-1-4254-7778-3
- The Unseen Host, and Other War Plays (1917) ISBN 978-0-548-94615-2
- The Reckoning (1922)
- Eight Comedies For Little Theaters ISBN 978-0-548-52675-0

=== Films (Story) ===
- Moonlight Follies (1921)
- The Guttersnipe (1922)
- The Rise of Duton Lang (1955)

=== Nonfiction ===
- The Craftmanship of One-Act Plays (1923)
