= Samuel Shipman =

American playwright

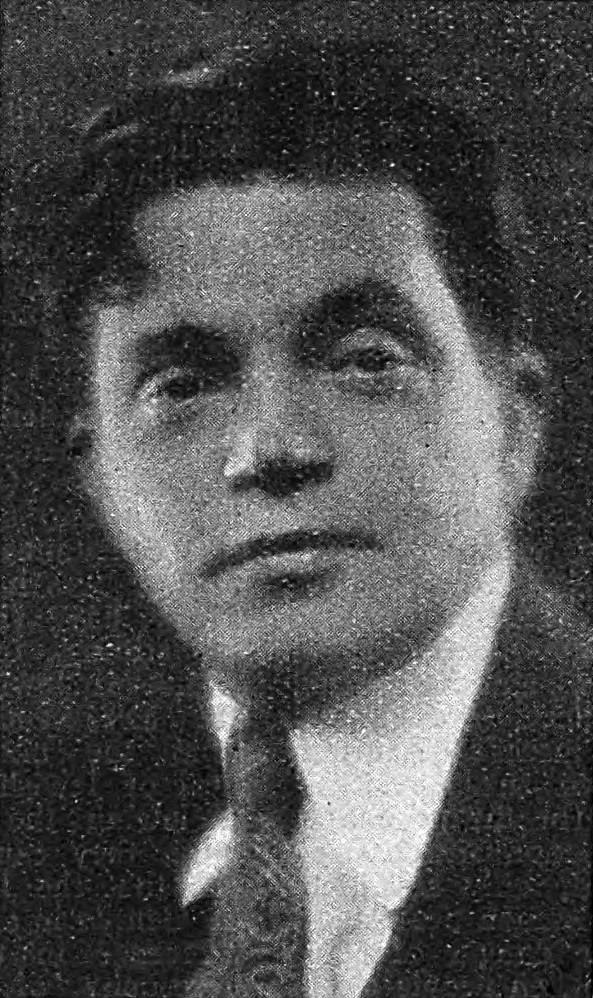
Samuel Shipman, dramatist

Samuel Shipman (1883 – February 9, 1937) was an American playwright. Several of his plays were adapted to film. He was Jewish.

He visited the Lakewood Theater in Maine with John B. Hymer.

== Theater ==
- East is West (1918), with John B. Hymer
- The Woman in Room 13 (1919), with Max Marcin and Percival Wilde
- Lawful Larceny (1922)
- Crime, with John B. Hymer
- Fast Life
- Creoles (1927)
- Trapped (1928)
- Fast Life (1928)
- Scarlet Pages (1929), with John B. Hymer
- She Means Business (1931)
- Alley Cat (1934)
- A Lady Detained (1935)
- Behind Red Lights (1937)
- Louisiana Lady (1947), based on Creoles
- Friendly Enemies, with Aaron Hoffman

== Filmography ==
- The Woman in Room 13 (1920)
- Lawful Larceny (1923), based on his play of the same name
- Cheaper to Marry (1925)
- Friendly Enemies (1925)
- Fast Life (1929)
- The Pay-Off (1929), based on his 1927 play, Crime
- Scarlet Pages (1930)
- Lawful Larceny (1930), based on his 1922 play of the same name
- Manhattan Parade (1931), based on Shipman's play
- Friendly Enemies (1942)
