= Evensong (novel) =

1932 novel

- First edition
- Author: Beverley Nichols
- Language: English
- Genre: Drama
- Publisher: Jonathan Cape
- Publication date: 1932
- Publication place: United Kingdom
- Media type: Print

Evensong is a 1932 novel by the British writer Beverley Nichols. It was inspired by the life of the opera singer Nellie Melba, whom Nichols had known during her later years. The same year, Nichols collaborated with Edward Knoblock on a play version, a major hit in the West End.

== Adaptation ==
In 1934, the story was adapted into a film of the same title by Gainsborough Pictures. Directed by Victor Saville, it starred Evelyn Laye in the lead role.

== Bibliography ==
- Goble, Alan. The Complete Index to Literary Sources in Film. Walter de Gruyter, 1999.
- Mordden, Ethan. Opera Anecdotes. Oxford University Press, 1985.
