= Alice and Claude Askew =

British authors

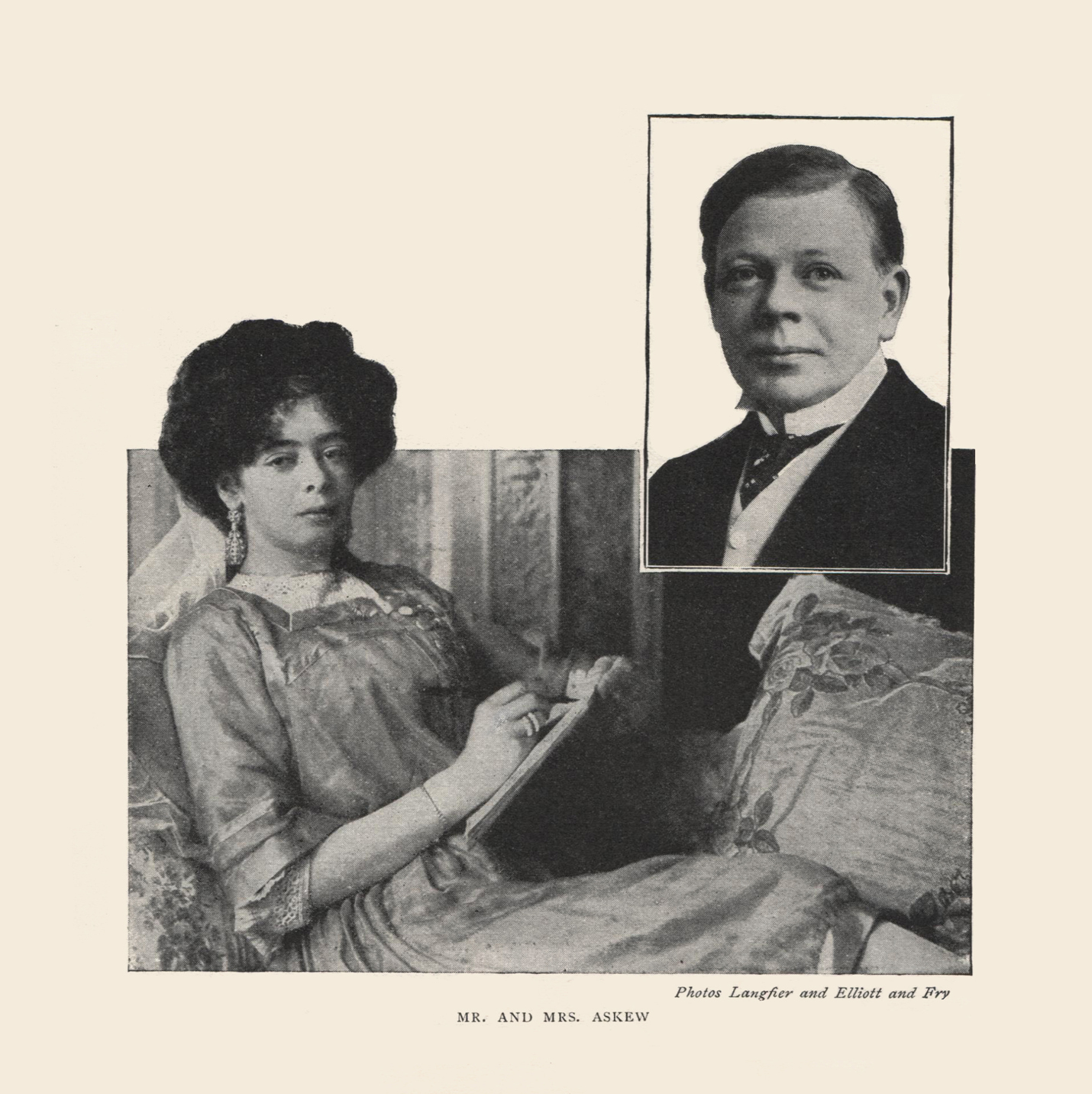
Alice and Claude Askew in a collage of two photographs from 'Woman at Home', October 1912.

Alice Askew, née Leake (18 June 1874 – 6 October 1917) along with her husband, Claude Askew (27 November 1865 – 6 October 1917) were British authors, who together wrote "over ninety novels, many published in sixpenny and sevenpenny series, between 1904 and 1918".

== Alice Askew ==
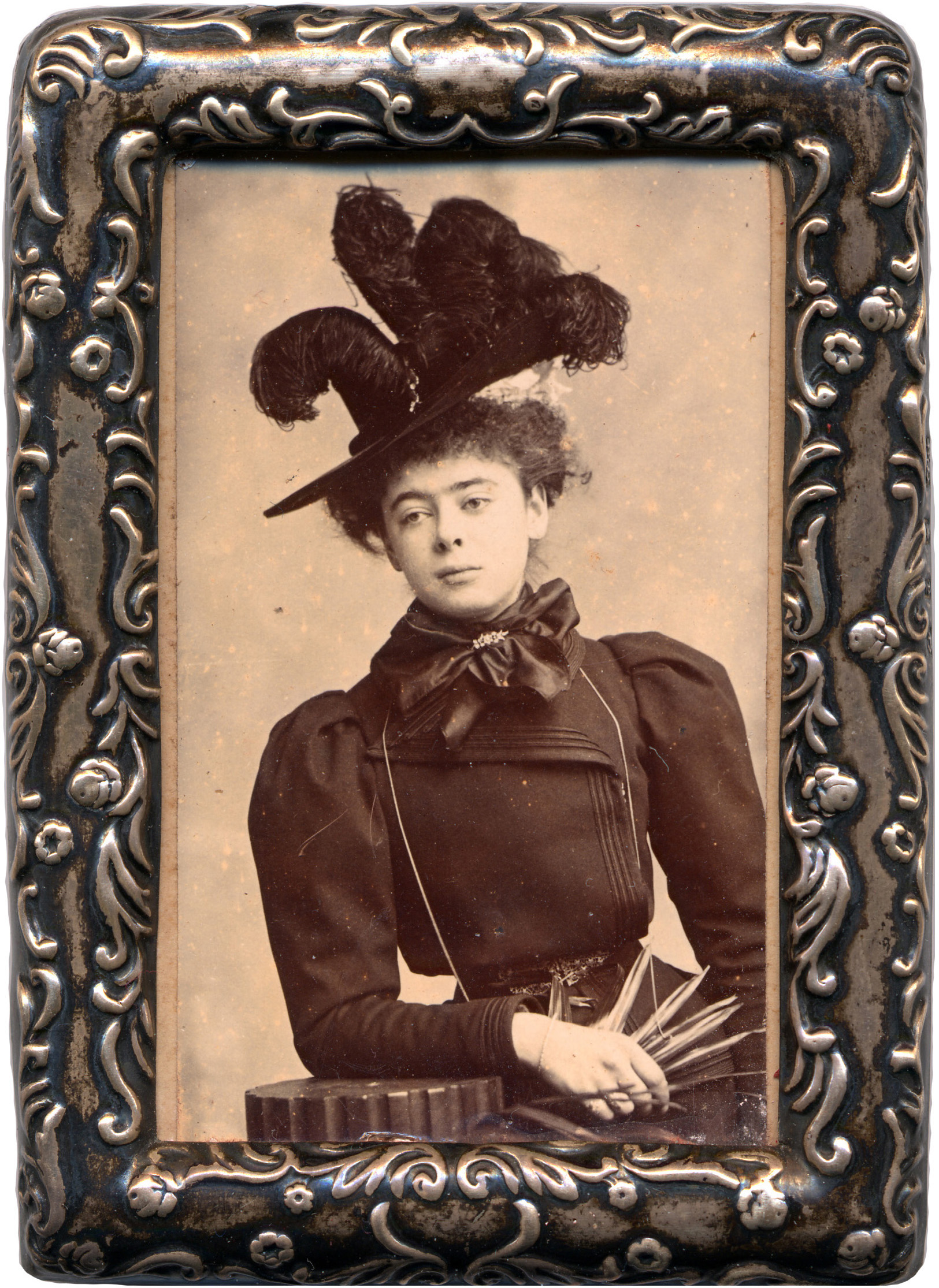
Alice Askew with feather hat, c. 1908.

Alice was born on 18 June 1874 at No. 3 Westbourne Street, near Hyde Park in London, England; and christened Alice Jane de Courcy on 5 August 1874 at the church of St. Michael and All Angels in Paddington, London. She was the eldest daughter of Jane Leake, née Dashwood (1844–1912) and Lt-Col. Henry Leake (1829–1899). At the time of her birth he was a captain, on half pay, late of the 70th (Surrey) Regiment of Foot. She had two younger siblings: Henry Dashwood Stucley Leake (17 Feb 1876 – 2 June 1970), and Frances Beatrice Levine Leake (27 May 1878 – 29 Aug 1884).

It has been said that she began writing solely or almost entirely "for her own amusement" before her marriage but she did have one short story published under her own name alone (or rather initials), "A. J. de C. L." = 'Alice Jane de Courcy Leake': 'A Modern-Day Saint', which appeared in 1894 in Belgravia of London.

== Claude Askew ==
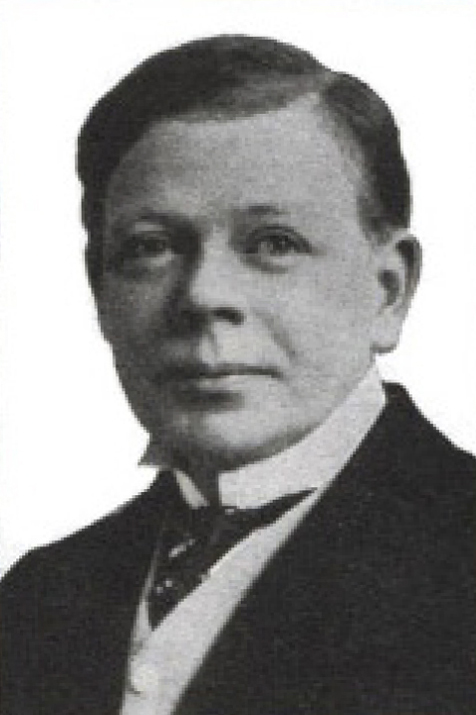
Claude Askew - black & white photograph, c.1912, by the studio of Elliott and Fry, London.

Claude was born on 27 November 1865 at No. 4 Holland Park, Kensington in London and christened Claude Arthur Cary. He was the second son and youngest of five children of Fanny Georgiana Charlotte Askew, née Browne (1830–1900) and Rev. John Askew, M.A. (1804–1881). Claude's older sisters and brother were: Amy Ellen Cary Askew (10 June 1857 – 29 April 1945), Isabel Emily Florence Askew (16 November 1858 – 30 October 1928), Mabel Fanny Mary Askew (23 February 1861 – 21 August 1941), and Hugh Henry John Percy Cary Askew (18 September 1862 – 14 April 1949).

Claude Askew was educated at Eton College – an 'Oppidan' (non-scholarship pupil) in Rev. Charles James' House, 'The Timbralls', Slough Road, near Windsor, then in Buckinghamshire (transferred to Berkshire in 1974). He entered in September 1879 and left in July 1883. It was probably during this period — certainly after 1877 and before 1883 — when Claude was taken on a holiday to Vevey (between Montreux and Lausanne) on Lake Geneva, where he met the future King Peter I of Serbia – then in exile in Geneva. "I was a small boy, spending my holidays with my people at Vevy on the Lake of Geneva, and at the hotel we struck up an acquaintance with Prince Peter Karageorgevitch. He was then in the prime of life, tall, dark, handsome—not yet married." He wrote this many years later recalling this childhood encounter when he met up with him once more – this time with his wife Alice and during the much darker circumstances of the 'Great Serbian Retreat' during World War I (see below). "At Koshumlja to-day we saw the King. Curiously enough, this was the first time that I have come across him since I have been in Serbia, though Alice has seen him at Topola. He is a fine old man, and neither trouble, sickness, nor age has bowed him." This from their jointly written book, The Stricken Land: Serbia As We Saw It, published in 1916.

There is some evidence that, after leaving Eton, he briefly studied medicine. "Claude Askew Born Nov. 27th 1865. Studied medicine." This from a hand-written history of the Askew family, written sometime in the early 1900s, by his cousin, Mary Elizabeth Stirling. And this detail is corroborated by notices in The Times, that between 1891 and 1893, Claude Askew, "of Guy's Hospital," passed a series of examinations by the 'Royal Colleges of Physicians and Surgeons'. There is no evidence, however, that he took those studies any further. And there is certainly no record of him ever becoming a doctor. Nonetheless, those studies may well have stood him in good stead when, during the First World War, he volunteered his services with a British field hospital attached to the Serbian Army, which both he and his wife (as a nurse) accompanied during its 'Great Retreat' across the mountains of Montenegro and Albania to the Adriatic coast, during the winter of 1915-1916 (see below).

== Marriage and partnership ==
Miss Alice Leake and Mr. Claude Askew were married on 10 July 1900, at Christ Church, Lancaster Gate, London.

A PICTURESQUE WEDDING: “There was a large and fashionable congregation on Tuesday afternoon at Christ Church, Lancaster Gate, to witness the marriage of Mr. Claude Arthur Cary Askew, second son of the late Rev. John Askew, M.A., to Miss Alice Jane de Courcey Leake, only surviving daughter of the late Lieut.-Colonel Henry Leake, late 44th and 70th Regiments, and of Mrs. Leake, 3, Westbourne Street, Hyde Park. The bridegroom, who is the proprietor of the Anglo-American Exchange, of London, New York, and Paris, has a host of friends and acquaintances among American visitors now in London, many of whom were present at the ceremony. ....”

At the time of their marriage, Claude Askew was living at 4D Hyde Park Mansions in the borough of Marylebone; while Alice Leake was still living with her mother at No. 3 Westbourne Street, where she had been born. Claude was also given as residing there at the time of the 1901 Census (March 31). However, by the time of the birth of their first child, they were together at his flat, 4D Hyde Park Mansions, where their son Geoffrey was born on 12 April 1901. By the time of the birth of their daughter, Joan on 5 July 1903, they had moved just around the corner to another flat in another building, 11B Oxford and Cambridge Mansions. Both of these mansion buildings north of Hyde Park, between Edgware Road and Marylebone Road, have a very distinctive and similar architecture. « Built in 1885, the Hyde Park, Oxford and Cambridge mansions are some of the capital’s most enduring examples of Victorian architecture. The buildings highlight a unique period in the nation’s history when the upper-middle class longed for expansive flats and substantial leases, but without the responsibilities of a house and access to porters to service the property. »

Sometime after the 1911 census (April 2), in which they (together with their two children and Alice's mother) were found living at Bridge House in Elstead, Godalming in Surrey, the Askews took possession of a house called ‘Botches’ in Wivelsfield Green, Haywards Heath in Sussex. « CLAUDE and ALICE ASKEW, who wrote popular serial novels in the daily papers, lived in a rambling old home at Wivelsfield Green, in Sussex, known as "Botches." This they enlarged and modernised; they developed the gardens and filled the grass with bulbs. Then came the War. Mr. and Mrs. ASKEW threw themselves into foreign work, and on one of their voyages were drowned through an enemy torpedo, and "Botches" became tenantless. It is "Botches" which has now (1919) been given to the Heritage for the reception of Southwark children. »

It was not long after their marriage, that Alice and Claude Askew had begun writing together. The first novel under their joint names, The Shulamite, was published in 1904. It is set in South Africa, where an Englishman comes to the rescue of an unhappily married woman from ‘the lash’ of her authoritarian and violent husband, a Boer farmer. Here it must be remembered that this was pretty soon after the Boer War (also known as the Second Boer War, which ran from 11 October 1899 to 31 May 1902). Afterwards Claude Askew, together with Edward Knoblock, wrote a stage adaptation of it, which was first produced in 1906 at the Savoy Theatre, London starring Lena Ashwell, and a little later with Miss Ashwell in the same role in New York City. In 1921 Paramount Pictures produced a silent film version with the title Under the Lash starring Gloria Swanson, and directed by Sam Wood.

The couple went on to publish "a large number of novels and serial stories". Alice & Claude Askew – always as co-authors after their marriage – wrote more than ninety stories, which were published variously in books, novelettes or novellas in popular magazines or 'weeklies'. In volume 46 of The Review of Reviews, published in 1912, there is a review of an article from another magazine, Woman at Home:—

WIVES WHO WORK WITH THEIR HUSBANDS.

RUDOLPH DE CORDOVA sketches in Woman at Home the activities of several famous wives and their husbands. Mrs. Ayrton, Lady Huggins, and Madame Curie, together with their husbands, were discoverers in the realms of science. The bulk of the article is, however, devoted to co-workers in the field of literature. Mr. and Mrs. Askew, Mr. and Mrs. Williamson, Mr. and Mrs. Egerton Castle, and Mr. and Mrs. Leighton will be familiar, through their work, to the novel reader. Mr. and Mrs. Askew had only had one story each published before their marriage. They went on working along their own individual lines for about a year:—
Mr. Askew was doing a lot of writing for Household Words, which was then under the proprietorship of Mr. Hall Caine, and naturally Mrs. Askew took a great deal of interest in it. About a year after they had been married it occurred to them that it would be pleasant to work together, since their tastes were so strikingly similar. They began with short stories, in which they have been as successful as they have been prolific, and contributed practically a new story every week to Household Words. A little later they thought they would try their hands at serial stories. The first one they did was accepted and was published in the Evening News under the title of "Gilded London." So great was its success that they received orders for a second.
Both Mr. and Mrs. Askew dream the plots on which many of their stories are founded:—
One of these was "The Baxter Family." So marked is this gift that when they want a plot for a new story it is no unusual thing for Mrs. Askew to say to herself on going to bed: "You will wake up to-morrow with your plot," and she does. It must, however, be told immediately, or it would be forgotten. These plots are always rapidly written down, and it has happened over and over again that the plot for a long serial has been practically set down in one sitting.

Jack Adrian writes in his Introduction to the collection of Alice and Claude Askew's 'Aylmer Vance' stories, published all together in one book for the first time in 1998, with the title, Aylmer Vance: Ghost-Seer, one of the Ash-tree Press Occult Detective Series, all edited by Jack Adrian:—

"... Both Claude Askew and his future wife were clearly temperamentally suited not only to each other, but to the literary life itself, since both, as it were dived into it at the first opportunity. The son of a country clergyman, Claude was sent to Eton (1879-1883), and there wrote a play in blank verse. His first paid work was a short story for Jerome K. Jerome’s doomed twopenny weekly To-Day (it nearly doomed Jerome at any rate, after an expensive libel action forced him to sell his interest or go to the wall). Alice ... wrote solely for her own amusement, before recalling Dr. Johnson's celebrated (to writers) dictum that 'no man but a blockhead ever wrote, except for money' and joining forces with Askew in the late 1890s. Her one published effort, before they married in 1900, 'A Modern-Day Saint', appeared in Belgravia. Once married, Askew himself began selling as much as he could to Dickens's old paper Household Words (then edited by the fiery Manx novelist Hall Caine), Alice soon joining him in the cerebral mechanics of plotting stories, then in the actual physical labour of writing.
Their method of collaboration was simple. If Claude thought of a plot, he would write the first half of the story, Alice the second. If she dreamed up the plot, she would start in on the writing, Claude finishing and polishing. In this way they could work on at least two projects at the same time; once the process had been refined, three or four projects. Or more. And in the case of the tirelessly industrious Askews it usually was more. ...." —Jack Adrian, March 1998.

== Alice and Claude Askew in 'The Great War' ==
Possibly the first instance of the Askews becoming actively involved anywhere near any of the actual fighting of the First World War, would be when they had both volunteered to help out with the Munro Ambulance Corps at Furnes in Belgium. They must have been there for some of the time between 18 October 1914 and 15 January 1915. This we learn from A War Nurse's Diary: Sketches from a Belgian Field Hospital by a 'World War I Nurse', published by The Macmillan Company, New York, 1918 (pp. 49–50). As the unnamed nurse wrote:—

... We lived in Furnes from October 18th to January 15th. All the time we were in Belgium we were never out of hearing of the constant boom and thunder of artillery, and at night the sky was afire with the battle going on to the east of us, about three miles away. Our life was a complex thing to describe; there was a constant coming and going of outsiders. People came to Furnes to see things---great people. The college being large and other accommodation in the town nil, we put them up, and they were our guests for the time being.
Attached to us was a most interesting body of people, "The Munro Ambulance Corps." Dr. Munro was its chief. He is now Sir Hector Munro. With him, driving ambulances, were many well known people; just a few names I remember---Lady Dorothy Feilding, the eldest son of General Melisse, head of the Belgian R. A. M. C., Dr. Jellett, the Dublin gynæcologist; Claude and Alice Askew, the novelists (since drowned in a submarine attack); Miss McNaughton, authoress; Mrs. Knocker and Miss Chisholme; Mr. Hunt of Yokohama and Mr. Sekkar, a great sport and our good friend. All their ambulances were stored in our front yard, numbering over twenty. With them were four jolly young gentlemen-amateur chauffeurs who soon became our friends. These people worked mostly at night, gathering the wounded and removing them under cover of darkness. We received all those who could not travel further into France. ....

Another source for this - including a description in their own words - comes from The Battles in Flanders, From Ypres to Neuve Chapelle by Edmund Dane, published by Hodder & Stoughton, London, 1915. Mr. Dane takes us back to the end of November, 1914:—

... A vivid impression of Flanders at this time (the end of November) has been recorded by Alice and Claude Askew, who as members of Dr. Hector Munro's Red Cross Ambulance Corps went to the front to distribute woollen comforters, cigarettes, coffee and chocolates:

"Up at Furnes the cold was terrible. The picturesque old town has been shelled twice, but as yet no great damage has been done, and the doctors and nurses working up at the Field Hospital—once a college—are hoping that their hospital may be spared, for this hospital, with its hundred beds and capable band of workers, is doing splendid service. ...
Mr. Seeker was operating in the theatre—a patient had just been brought in from the trenches and immediate operation was necessary. A few oil lamps supplied the only illumination; the room was in complete shadow save round the operating table. Outside the wind howled and moaned, and firing could be heard in the distance. We felt very close to the naked heart of war. ...
The whole thing seems unreal—the torn road—those blurred lines of men—the distant gun fire. The effect is that of a dream. We have seen the grim and terrible side of war—the bleeding side.
The moon—a pale sickle moon—shines out of the dun sky—the cold becomes more intense every moment—more freezing."

Following this experience at Furnes in Belgium, Alice and Claude Askew published their novel, The Tocsin (London: John Long, 1915). The wartime novel is initially set in England before moving its setting to Belgium, drawing on Mrs. Claude Askew's firsthand experience with the Belgium Field Hospital. They also wrote another novel, Nurse!, (London: Hodder and Stoughton, 1916), using her volunteer work with the Red Cross.

After their time in Belgium, and having returned to England, they turned their attention to the plight of Serbia. Alice Askew had a close friend in Mildred 'Millie' Watson, who was then Secretary of the Serbian Relief Fund (SRF), which was headquartered in London's Cromwell Road. Both Mr. and Mrs. Askew became involved in helping to raise funds for Serbia. They also made plans to join another hospital unit that would travel to Serbia, where they would join with other British units working in a field hospital that would be attached to the Second Serbian Army. They were also Special Correspondents for the British newspaper Daily Express. As Claude himself describes their role: "As for Alice and myself, we went out essentially as writers, though we were prepared to turn our hands to odd jobs if called upon to do so. We had assisted Dr. Hartnell Beavis in London with the formation of the unit, the raising of funds, and the collection of stores. It was the reports in the English Press of the terrible state into which Serbia had fallen during the winter of 1914–1915 that first inspired us to work for that gallant little country." He wrote this in their personal account of their experiences and impressions accompanying the Serbian army on its famous 'Great Retreat' across the mountains from Pristina to Alessio, during the winter of 1915–16, which was published in 1916 under the title: The Stricken Land: Serbia As We Saw It.

They had left England aboard the Admiralty transport Saidieh, a Greek vessel with an English captain, which departed from Liverpool on Thursday, April 1, 1915 - bound first for Salonika (as Thessaloniki was then called in English). This detail is learned from another volunteer with a British field hospital, who wrote a diary of her experiences: My Diary in Serbia April 1, 1915—Nov. 1, 1915 by Monica M. Stanley - attached to the "Stobart Field Hospital" in Serbia. And her diary has a couple of mentions of both Alice and Claude Askew during the voyage. She goes on to tell us that the Saidieh arrived at Salonika on Thursday, April 15 at 2 o'clock in the afternoon. As also do Alice and Claude in their The Stricken Land: "When we, together with the unit to which we were attached—the First British Field Hospital for Serbia—reached Salonika on April 15th, 1915." They also confessed to having "mixed memories" of "poor old Saidiah," which were "on the whole not unaffectionate." They went on to write: "Taking things all round we were not sorry to disembark from the Saidiah, but I think that no one who travelled upon her heard without a sigh of kindly reminiscence, some weeks later, that she had been torpedoed in the Channel and gone to the bottom. We had had an anxious time ourselves for a couple of days and nights in the early part of the voyage, for we were fair game for the enemy, and without escort."

Almost a week later they travelled from Salonika by train to Skoplje in Serbia, where their unit would stop and "mark time" and be given control of the 3rd Hospital there. Only after their "long stay" at Skopjle - due to the then prevailing cessation of hostilities, which meant that their "special services as a field hospital could not as yet be called in" - did they finally continue on to Mladenovatz ("some forty miles from Belgrade"), where the "First British Field Hospital for Serbia would - "in due course (be) transferred." They would stay until: "On September 28th, 1915, we left Mladenovatz, and it is from that date that we may reckon the beginning of the long and eventful journeying—nearly three months—that carried us across Serbia and Montenegro and has eventually landed us here at Scutari in Albania. Where and when the end will be I cannot yet say. We were bound for Pirot, a little town on the Bulgarian frontier, where our army was concentrating against an attack, which was regarded as imminent. .... ”

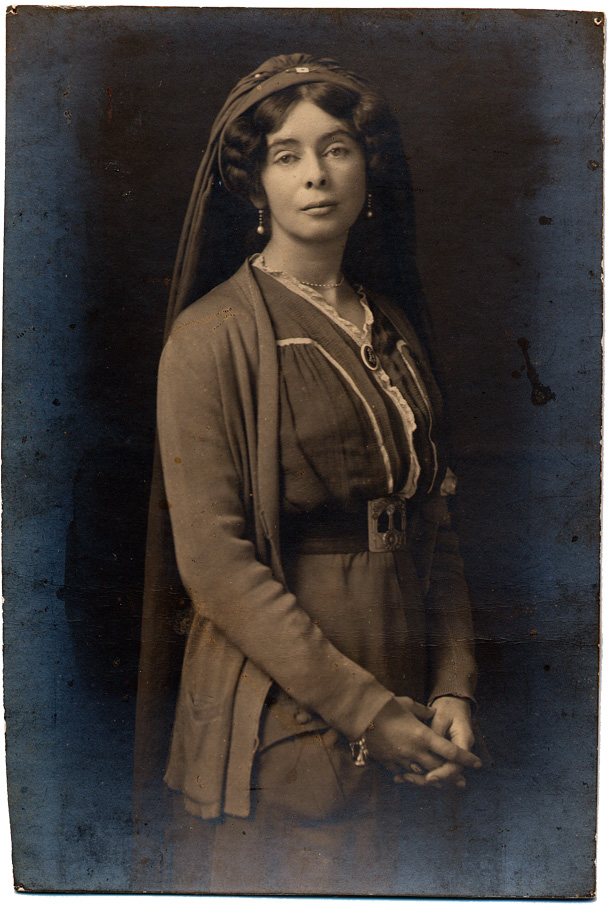
Alice Askew in Serbian nurse's uniform, unsigned photograph, c. 1916.

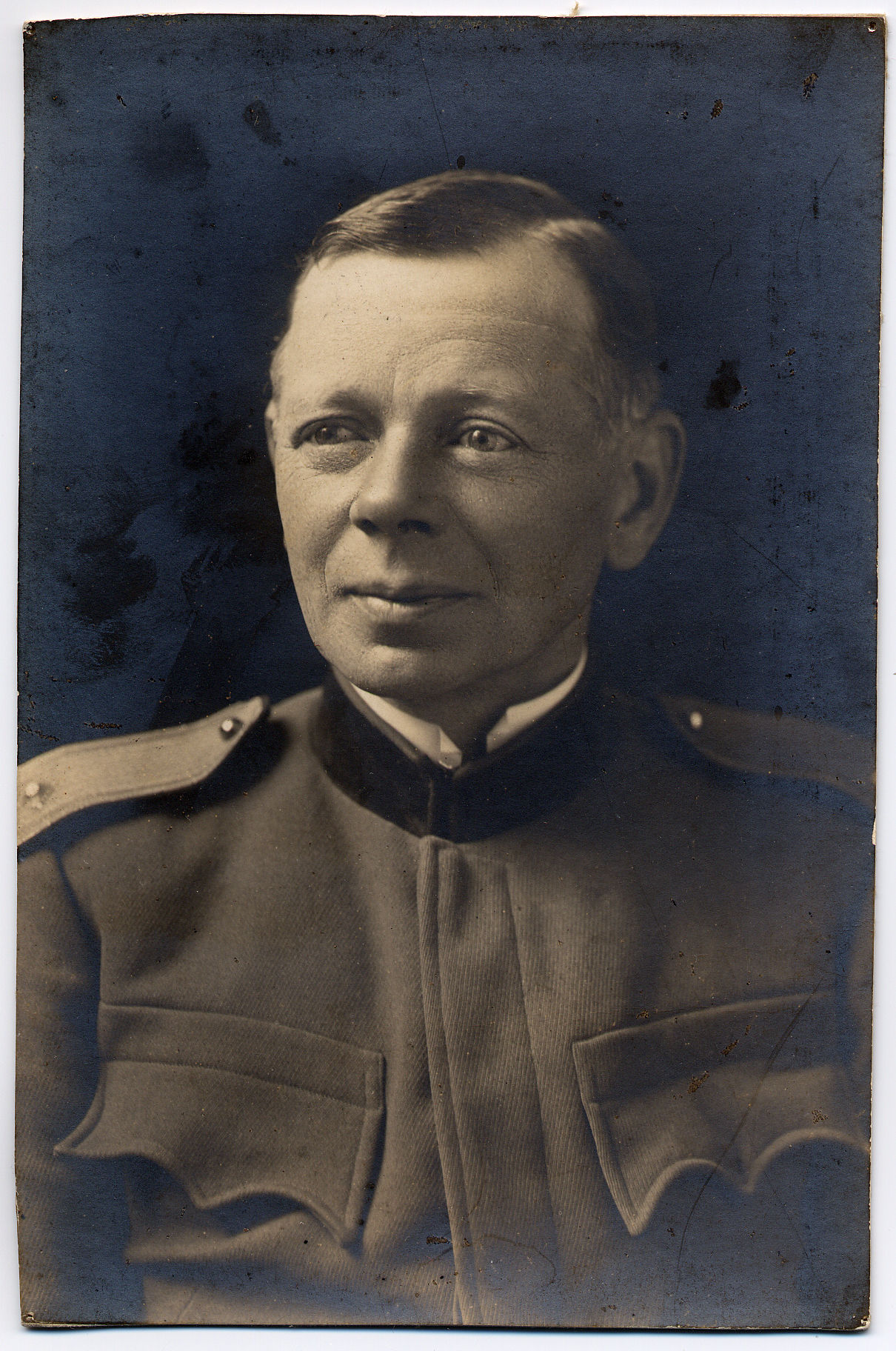
Claude Askew in Serbian uniform, unsigned photograph, c. 1916

Much later - The Times edition of 15 October 1917, in their obituary for 'Major and Mrs Askew', mentioned that the authors of "The Shulamite" had spent some six months in Serbia before the retreat and wrote with sympathy and real knowledge of Serbia and the Serbian character. Claude Askew had been given the honorary commission of a major in the Serbian army.

Following the 'Great Serbian Retreat' (see: Serbian Campaign), when the bulk of the Serbian army had been evacuated to the Greek island of Corfu, Alice and Claude Askew both returned to England, which they reached by April 1916. By sometime in May, after finishing and arranging the publication of The Stricken Land, Claude was back with the Serbian army – now at Salonika, where he was working out of its Press Bureau but Alice remained in London to give birth to her third child, who was born towards the end of July 1916. She also spent the time in England soliciting support for the relief work with Serbia but in October she returned to the theatre of war and was with Claude in Salonika until about the end of April of the following year, when she went to Corfu to work with the Serbian Red Cross there, under Colonel Borissavljevitch.

== Deaths ==
Sometime before the end of September 1917, the Askews were on leave together in Italy – very likely in Rome, where they were hoping to meet up with their two older children. They probably left Rome on the last day of September to return to Corfu. Claude had sent a letter, dated Rome, September 30 (1917), to his older brother Hugh Askew in London, in which he wrote: "We are leaving here to-night to return to Corfu." They most likely travelled from Rome directly to the southern port of Taranto in Apulia, where they could embark on the Italian steamer Città di Bari bound for Corfu. It has been reported that the Città di Bari left Taranto on 4 October to stop en route at the nearby port of Gallipoli - also in Apulia, from where it departed for Corfu at 6:30 in the evening of the next day. Then during the early hours of 6 October 1917, when it had almost reached its destination – "about 37 miles from Paxo" (or Paxoi), which lies just south of Corfu – the Città di Bari suffered a fatal torpedo attack from a German submarine, SM UB-48, under the command of Oberleutnant zur See (Sub-lieutenant) Wolfgang Steinbauer – and sank a little after 4:30 in the morning. Although there were some conflicting stories in the British newspapers, they did mostly agree that Alice and Claude Askew had both drowned in the incident.

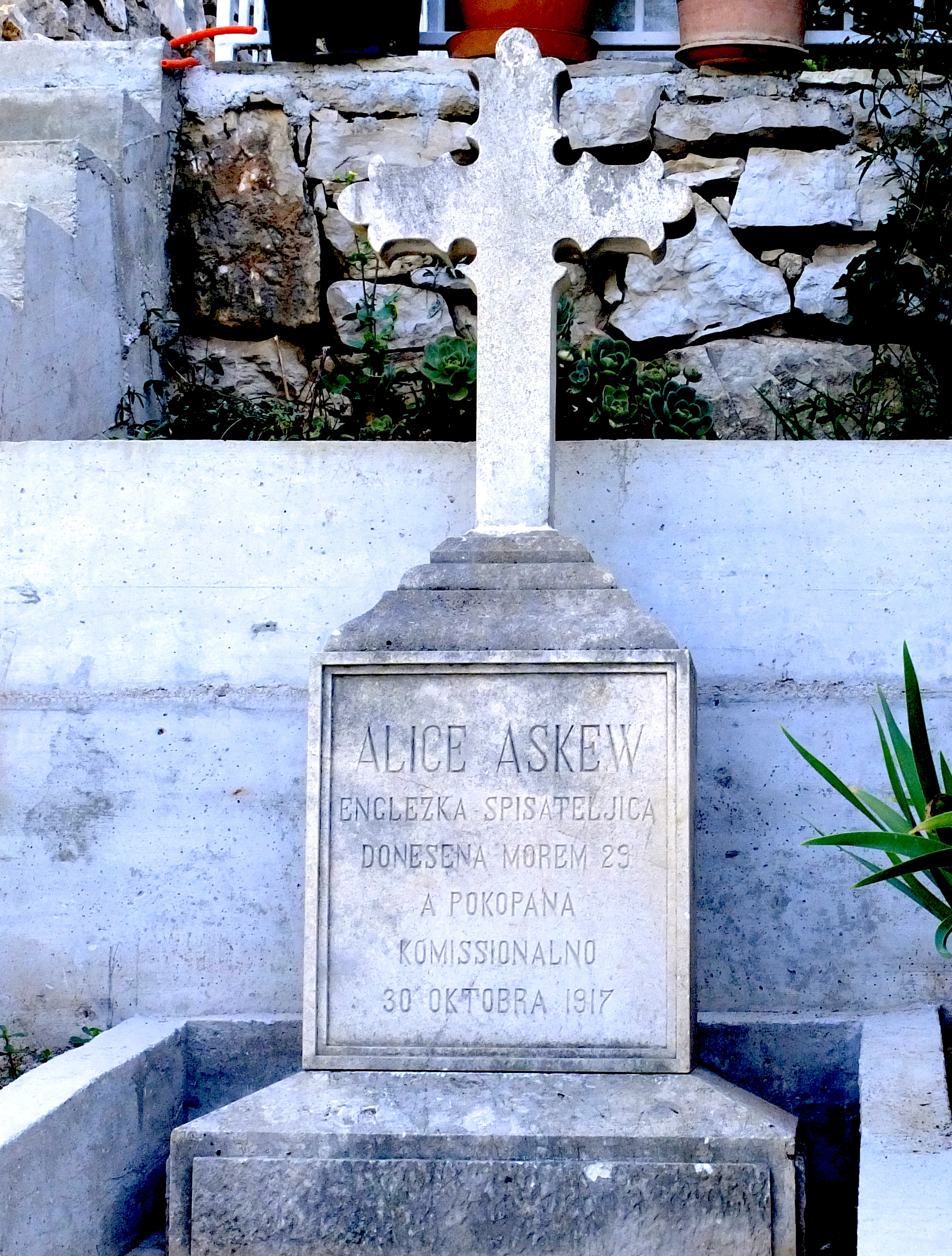
Alice Askew's tombstone

Claude's body was never recovered but on 29 October the body of a woman was "found on the seashore at Porto Karboni on the island of Korčula" by a local fisherman. In fact her body had fetched up in a small cove on the inland side of a smaller island called Zvirinovik – just in front of the fishing village of Karbuni (as it is now spelled) – near the town of Blato. On the following day her body was examined by the authorities and, from various letters and telegrams that were found about her person, identified as that of the "well-known English lady writer Alice Askew of London." She was buried that same day 30 October 1917 at Karbuni, where a stone cross was erected there, bearing the following inscription: ALICE ASKEW / englezka spisateljica / donesena morem 29 / a pokopana / komissionalno / 30 oktobra 1917 - (roughly translated from the original Croatian: "ALICE ASKEW / English writer / delivered up from the sea 29 / and buried / by commission / 30 October 1917"). Since then the cove, where her body was found, has been marked on maps with the name: 'U.' – short for uvala (cove or inlet) Bok od Engležiće.

Previously – on 21 October 1917, a memorial service for Alice and Claude Askew was held at the Serbian Church in Corfu, attended by a large number of both Serbian and British officials. It was conducted by the Archbishop of Serbia, "who paid an eloquent and touching tribute to the benevolent work of Major and Mrs. Askew, to whom, he said, the Serbian people owed eternal gratitude".

The Windsor Magazine issue 279 (March 1918) carried a final article, From Salonica to the Albanian Coast by "the late Major Claude Askew", introduced as "the following article has a pathetic interest as one of the last few manuscripts sent to England by the author before he and his gifted wife and collaborator met their tragic death, through the torpedoing of a vessel on which they were returning to their War duties at Salonica and in Corfu, after a brief absence in Italy in connection with the work of the Serbian Red Cross. By a sad coincidence, this theme is introduced with a reference to the submarine peril, to which Major and Mrs. Askew fell victims within a few weeks of the dispatch of this article."

Alice and Claude Askew were survived by one son and two daughters.

== Selected works ==
- The Shulamite (1904) — later adapted into the 1906 stageplay The Shulamite and later films
- The Etonian (1906)
- The Plains of Silence (1907)
- Lucy Gort: A Study in Temperament (1907)
- The Sealed Tower (1907)
- Behind Shuttered Windows (1908)
- Not Proven (1908)
- A Daughter of Art (1909)
- The Rod of Justice (1910)
- The Sporting Chance (1910)
- Two Apaches of Paris (1911)
- Outlaw Jess (1912)
- The Stolen Lady (1912)
- The Unwilling Adventuress (1912)
- God's Clay (1913)
- The House of the Black Panther (1914)
- In Strange Shoes (1914)
- The Stricken Land: Serbia As We Saw It (1916)
