= Under the Lash =

1921 film

- Lobby card
- Directed by: Sam Wood
- Written by: J. E. Nash
- Based on: The Shulamite by Alice and Claude Askew; The Shulamite by Claude Askew and Edward Knoblock
- Starring: Gloria Swanson
- Cinematography: Alfred Gilks
- Distributed by: Paramount Pictures
- Release date: October 16, 1921
- Running time: 6 reels
- Country: United States
- Language: Silent (English intertitles)

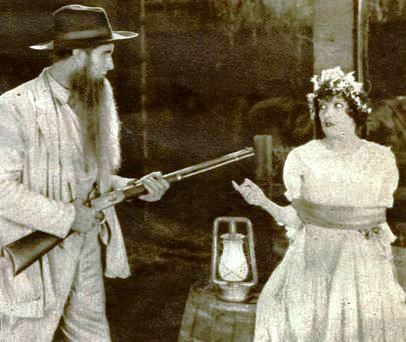
Gloria Swanson and unidentified actor (actually it's Russell Simpson)

Under the Lash is a 1921 American silent drama film directed by Sam Wood and starring Gloria Swanson. The film is based on the 1906 play The Shulamite by Claude Askew and Edward Knoblock, and the 1904 novel of the same name by Alice and Claude Askew. The film is lost with no copies of it existing in any archives.

== Plot ==
As described in a film magazine, Deborah, the second wife of intolerant and bigoted Boer farmer Simeon Krillet, first learns of kindness from the Englishman Robert Waring who comes to study farming from her husband. When her husband threatens to beat her for reading one of the Englishman's books Deborah tells him, to save him from the young man's wrath, that she is to become a mother. He desists and his cruelty turns to kindness. The disclosure of her fabrication brings renewal of his wrath and a determination to kill her. While attempting a rescue, the Englishman kills the husband. Subsequent complications are disposed of which allows a happy ending.

== Cast ==
- Gloria Swanson as Deborah Krillet
- Mahlon Hamilton as Robert Waring
- Russell Simpson as Simeon Krillet
- Lillian Leighton as Tant Anna Vanderberg
- Lincoln Stedman as Jan Vanderberg
- Thena Jasper as Memke
- Clarence Ford as Kaffir boy

== Reception ==
Upon its release, Under the Lash was not well received by audiences. It was the only Paramount Pictures film released in the early 1920s starring Gloria Swanson that did not do well at the box office.

== Censorship ==
Before Under the Lash could be exhibited in Kansas, the Kansas Board of Review required the shortening of two reel 3 scenes, one of holding hands, the other of a black man being beaten. The intertitle "The Lord giveth and the Lord taketh away" in reel 5 was eliminated.
