= Henry Simson =

British physician (1872–1932)

Sir Henry Simson
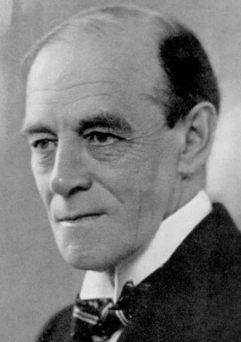
- Born: Henry John Forbes Simson; 12 December 1872; Bareilly, India
- Died: 13 September 1932 (aged 59); West London Hospital, Hammersmith, London
- Occupations: Physician, Obstetrician
- Years active: 1895–1932
- Known for: founder of the Royal College of Obstetricians and Gynaecologists
- Spouse: Lena Ashwell (m. 1908)

Sir Henry John Forbes Simson KCVO, FRCSE, FRCP, FRCOG (12 December 1872 – 13 September 1932) was a British physician who became obstetrician to the British royal family and delivered (amongst many others) the future Queen Elizabeth II and her sister Princess Margaret. He was one of the joint founders of the Royal College of Obstetricians and Gynaecologists in London.

== Life ==
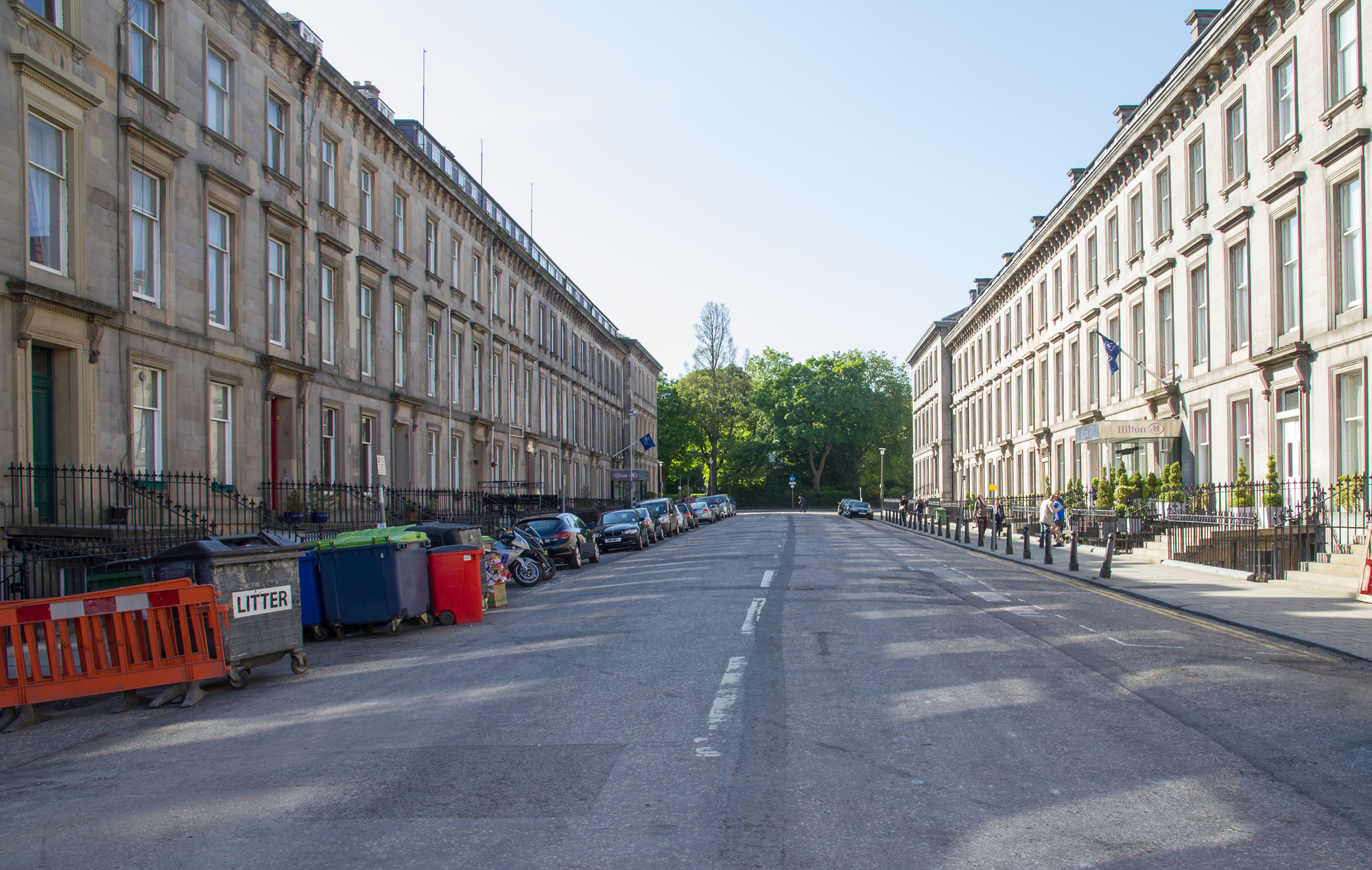
Grosvenor Street, Edinburgh

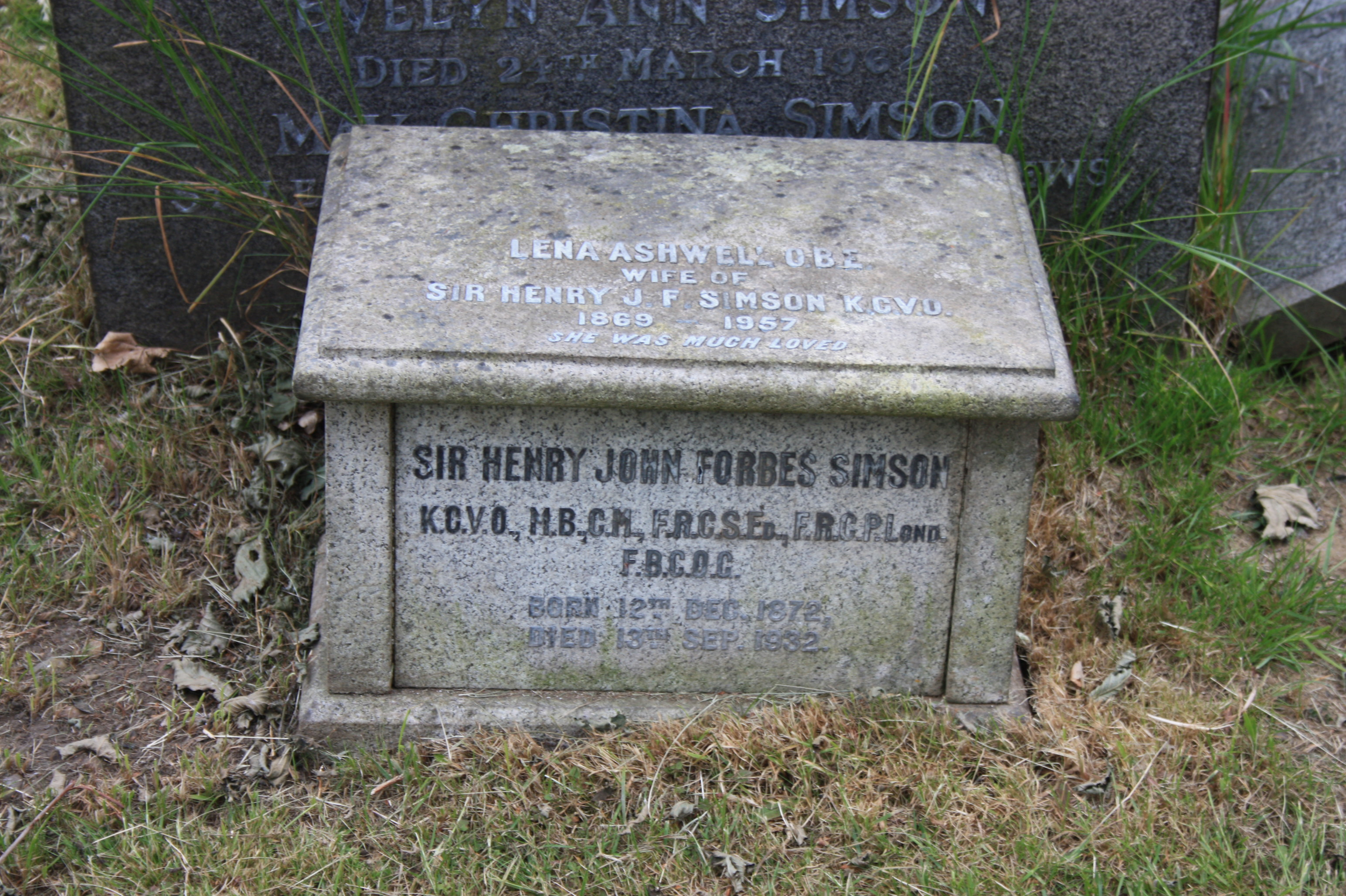
The ashes of Lena Ashwell and Sir Henry Simson, Dean Cemetery

He was born on 12 December 1872 in Bareilly in India to Scottish parents, his father being Robert Simson (1827–1905) of the Bengal Civil Service, and his wife Amy Inglis (1848–1929). His paternal grandfather was Rev Henry Simson of Garioch in Aberdeenshire. His family returned to Edinburgh in Henry's youth. The family lived at 13 Grosvenor Street in Edinburgh's West End.

He was educated at the Edinburgh Collegiate School at 27/28 Charlotte Square then studied medicine at Edinburgh University graduating MB ChB in 1895. He then worked variously at Edinburgh Royal Infirmary, Edinburgh's Hospital for Sick Children and Edinburgh Maternity Hospital (under John Halliday Croom) before moving to London in 1902 where he rapidly gained fame as an obstetrician. His first role was at the Hospital for Women in Soho.

In the First World War he ran the Maternity Hospital for Officers Wives in London. Around 1916 he was chosen by King George V as official obstetrician to the British Royal Family, an ultimate accolade of trust in this field. He was created a Knight Commander of the Royal Victorian Order by the king in 1925.

He died of a heart attack at the close of an operation in West London Hospital whilst still in the theatre, on 13 September 1932 aged 59. His ashes are placed over his parents' grave in Dean Cemetery in western Edinburgh. The grave lies in the northern Victorian extension on a north-south path towards the north-east, close to his cousin Elsie Inglis. His wife's ashes were added on her death.

== Family and private life ==
In 1908, he married (in a register office) the divorced actress and socialite Lena Ashwell. They were introduced by her cousin, Sir Alfred Downing. The union was childless.

His cousin (via his mother Amy Inglis) was Elsie Inglis and she is buried nearby him. His youngest brother, Ernest Simson, served in the Indian Medical Service and died in India in 1910. His younger brother, Lt Col James Robert Simson of the Highland Light Infantry, was severely wounded at the Second Battle of Gaza in April 1917 and died of those wounds in hospital in England. He is buried in Dean Cemetery next to his family. His cousin Harry MacDonald Simson WS married Isobel Cadell the niece of the female medical pioneer Grace Cadell.

Simson was a senior Freemason in London and a member of the Garrick Club and the Savile Club. He was a keen golfer and rugby player.
