= The Shulamite =

Edwardian drama by Edward Knoblock

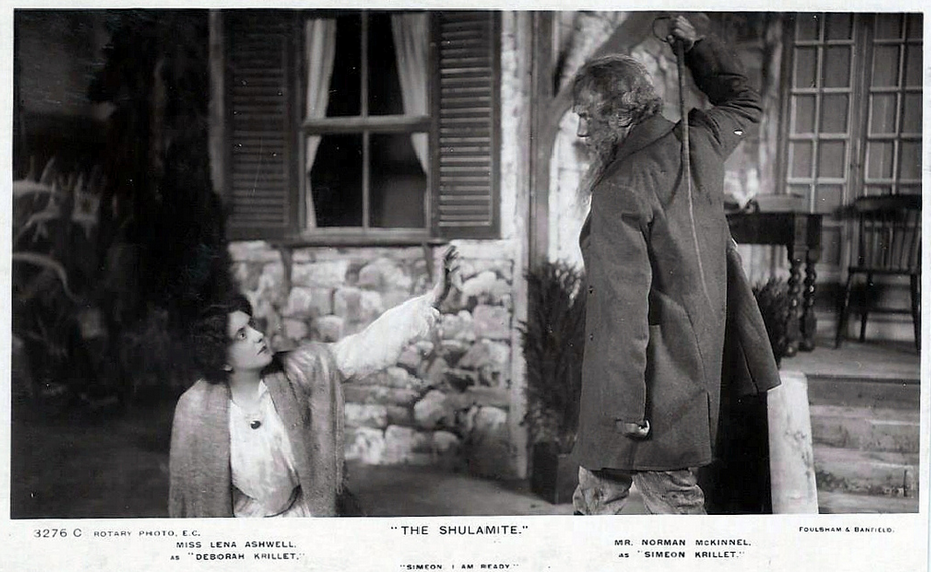
- Scene from the West End staging with Lena Ashwell and Norman McKinnel
- Original language: English
- Written by: Edward Knoblock from the novel by Alice & Claude Askew
- Genre: Melodrama
- Setting: South Africa

The Shulamite is an Edwardian drama, or melodrama, based on a novel of the same name. It played in London and New York in 1906 with Lena Ashwell in the lead role. It tells of a South African farmer's wife trapped in an unhappy marriage who falls in love with a visiting Englishman. In a dramatic scene the husband is killed. The death is made to seem an accident, but the lovers must part. Later the play was changed to give it a happy ending. The Shulamite was well received in London, but had limited success in the USA. It was made into a silent film The Shulamite in 1915, later renamed as The Folly of Desire, and in 1921 was made into the silent film Under the Lash with Gloria Swanson.

== Background ==
The play is a dramatisation by Edward Knoblock of the novel The Shulamite by the prolific romance writers Alice and Claude Askew. The Shulamite, probably meaning "the woman from Shulem", is a Biblical character mentioned in the Song of Solomon. She was the bride of a shepherd, but her great beauty attracted Solomon, who tried to win her for his harem.

== Plot ==
The story is set in the Transvaal, South Africa. Deborah is the wife of the brutal farmer Simeon Krillet, who beats her. She falls in love with Waring, an Englishman who is staying with them to learn farming. Waring tries to escape the situation, but his horse is struck by lightning and he has to return. He finds that Krillet has read his diary and knows about the love between him and Deborah. Waring defends Deborah, and is forced to kill Krillet in self-defense. The couple takes the body to Waring's horse, making it seem that Krillet had died in the lightning strike. When Waring plans to return to England where his alcoholic wife is dying, Deborah becomes jealous and tells the true story of Krillet's death to his sister. She agrees not to reveal the secret on the condition that the lovers never meet again.

== London production ==
The play had only six characters, so could be staged at low cost, which made it attractive to Lena Ashwell's syndicate. It opened at the Savoy Theatre in London on 12 May 1906, with Ashwell in the lead role and Norman McKinnel as Krillet. The play ran for 45 performances at the Savoy between 12 May and 26 June 1906. The cast was:

- Lena Ashwell as Deborah Krillet
- Norman McKinnel as Simeon Krillet
- Henry Ainley as Robert Waring
- Eugene Mayeur as Jan Vanderberg
- Elsie Chester as Tante Anna Vandenberg
- Beryl Mercer as Memke

On 12 June the play was revised to give the third act a happy ending. The critic J. T. Grein called the production melodramatic and in poor taste. However, the Evening Standard was enthusiastic about Ashwell's dramatic performance. The Era said it was,

One of those plays that hold the audience in a pincer-like grip, that wring the heart and strain the nerves ... few, if any, actresses on the English stage could have so well rendered the indignant revolt, the mad passion, and the intense agony ... Norman McKinnel gave a grandly simple and nobly rugged impersonation of the stern, cruel, deeply serious Boer ... impressive, acted with tremendous fervour and intensity.

== United States ==
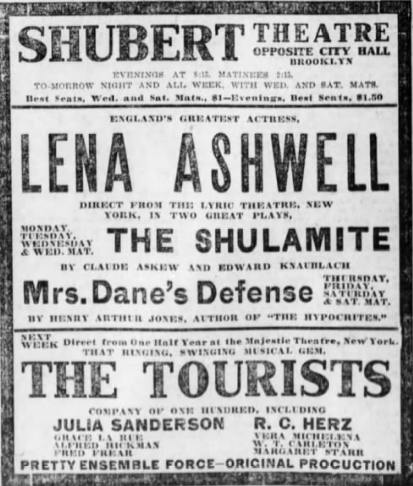
Ad from the Brooklyn Daily Eagle of 2 December 1906

Ashwell took The Shulamite across the Atlantic, introducing it in Chicago. The Shubert Brothers produced the play in the United States. Advance notices said "The Shulamite, according to the London reviewers, ranks even ahead of Pinero's His House in Order as the most powerful play of the London season." Later reviews were tepid. A New York critic warned theatergoers on 21 October 1906, "Miss Ashwell has been a competent and prominent actress in London for several years now, but in reading of her work I have never seen the emphasis placed so heavily on her poetic and imaginative qualities as the Chicago brethren place it. The quality is fortunate and timely, because from all accounts The Shulamite, which we shall see next week, sadly needs poetry for its appreciation."

The play opened at the Lyric Theatre, New York, on 29 October 1906, and closed the next month after just 25 performances. It was directed by J. C. Huffman. The cast was:

- Lena Ashwell (her Broadway debut)
- John Blair
- George Le Guere
- Edward R. Mawson
- Maude Granger
- Beryl Mercer (her Broadway debut)

The New York Times critic wrote that Ashwell "had been rather badly handicapped on her first visit here by a bad play ... Miss Beryl Mercer, who appeared as a little Kaffir slave, is most to be commended for a bit of character that is pathetically appealing. After New York, the play was staged in the Shubert Theatre in Brooklyn in December 1906.

== Film versions ==
The Shulamite was made into a film in 1915, later renamed The Folly of Desire, directed by George Loane Tucker. The cast was:

- Norman McKinnel as Simeon Knollett
- Manora Thew as Deborah
- Gerald Ames as Robert Waring
- Mary Dibley as Joan Waring
- Gwynne Herbert as Mrs. Waring
- Minna Grey as Tanta Anna
- Bert Wynne as Jan Van Kennel

The Shulamite was used as the basis for the 1921 silent movie Under the Lash starring Gloria Swanson, Russell Simpson and Mahlon Hamilton, directed by Sam Wood. The dark and gloomy screenplay, and Swanson's role without glamorous gowns and jewellery, was a deliberate change from her former roles. The movie included advanced special effects in the storm sequence, where trees were blown up to appear as though they had been struck by lightning.

== Sources ==
- Leask, Margaret (1 July 2012). Lena Ashwell: Actress, Patriot, Pioneer. Univ of Hertfordshire Press. ISBN 978-1-907396-75-5.
- Nissen, Axel (21 February 2012). Mothers, Mammies and Old Maids: Twenty-Five Character Actresses of Golden Age Hollywood. McFarland. ISBN 978-0-7864-9045-5.
- "Notes of actors and their plays". San Francisco Call. 100 (17). 17 June 1906.
- Shearer, Stephen Michael (27 August 2013). Gloria Swanson: The Ultimate Star. St. Martin's Press. ISBN 978-1-250-01366-8.
- "Shubert Theatre". Brooklyn Daily Eagle. 2 December 1906.
- "Shulamite (R. V. Shulammite; Greek, Σουναμῖτις)". Jewish Encyclopedia. 1906.
- "The Folly of Desire". IMDb.
- "The Shulamite". IBDB.
- "The Theaters". The Brooklyn Daily Eagle: 38. 21 October 1906.
- Wearing, J. P. (5 December 2013). The London Stage 1900–1909: A Calendar of Productions, Performers, and Personnel. Scarecrow Press. ISBN 978-0-8108-9294-1.
