= Marion Fawcett =

British actress and theatre director

- Born: Catherine Rodger Campbell; 25 November 1877; Liverpool
- Died: 1957 (aged 79–80)
- Known for: theatre director and actor

Catherine Rodger Ball (born Catherine Rodger Campbell; 1877 – 1957), known professionally as Marion Fawcett, was a British actress and theatre producer and director.

== Life ==
Fawcett was born in Toxteth Park in Liverpool (although one source says Aberdeen). Her name was Catherine Rodger Campbell. Her mother was also named Catherine and her father Peter Campbell was a marine engineer. She became a stage actress and adopted the name "Marion Fawcett".

After the first world war, Lena Ashwell was delivering subsidised theatre around London. By 1923, there was a "Friends of the Players" with members receiving the "Lena Ashley Players Magazine". Ashwell formed the Lena Ashwell Players Ltd in April 1923. The directors were Ashwell, Fawcett, Esme Church, and Cicely Hamilton. The first three of these were to be the company's theatre managers and Fawcett was also the first manager of the new company. The players continued to appear throughout London, and Laurence Olivier was later to become a member. In 1926, Fawcett was producing plays at the Theatre Royal in Huddesfield. She produced two "International Masterpieces Seasons", which included The Cherry Orchard and Uncle Vanya by Chekov and The Wild Duck by Henry Ibsen. Notably, she produced a play in which Pierre Fresnay of the comedie Francais delivered his lines in French. The play was "Game as He Played It" and it was delivered in the 1927 season.

In 1931, she was producing plays in Malta.

She directed the play Royal Romance at the end of 1947. The play told the story of Queen Victoria from her 21st birthday to her marriage. She played the role of Boppy in the play.

In 1954, she appeared at the St James's Theatre in London in Terence Rattigan's successful play Separate Tables, in which she played Mabel with a cast led by Margaret Leighton and Eric Portman. The play was directed by Peter Glenville.
