= The Outside Woman =

1921 film directed by Sam Wood

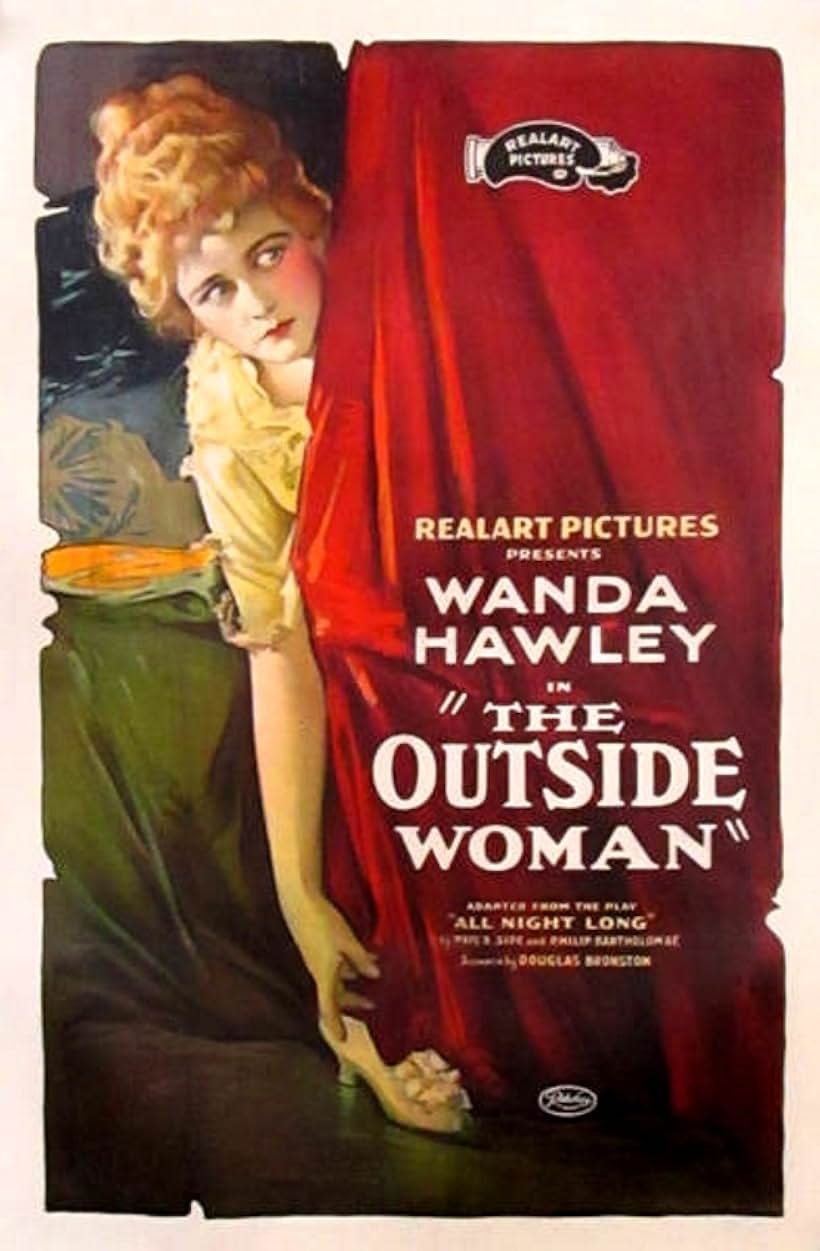
- Theatrical release poster
- Directed by: Sam Wood
- Screenplay by: Douglas Bronston
- Based on: All Night Long by Paul B. Sipe; Philip Bartholoae
- Starring: Wanda Hawley; Clyde Fillmore; Sidney Bracey; Rosita Marstini; Misao Seki; Thena Jasper
- Cinematography: Paul P. Perry
- Production company: Realart Pictures Corporation
- Distributed by: Realart Pictures Corporation
- Release date: February 1921
- Running time: 50 minutes
- Country: United States
- Language: Silent (English intertitles)

The Outside Woman is a lost 1921 American comedy film directed by Sam Wood and written by Douglas Bronston. The film stars Wanda Hawley, Clyde Fillmore, Sidney Bracey, Rosita Marstini, Misao Seki, and Thena Jasper. The film was released in February 1921, by Realart Pictures Corporation.

== Cast ==
- Wanda Hawley as Dorothy Ralston
- Clyde Fillmore as Dr. Frederick Ralston
- Sidney Bracey as Mr. Cambridge
- Rosita Marstini as Mrs. Cambridge
- Misao Seki as Togo
- Thena Jasper as Gussie
- Mary Winston as Mrs. Trent
- Jacob Abrams as Curator
