= The Good Companions (play) =

1931 play

- Original language: English
- Written by: J.B. Priestley; Edward Knoblock
- Genre: Drama

Premiere
- Date: 14 April 1931
- Place: Princes of Wales's Theatre, Birmingham; His Majesty's Theatre, London

The Good Companions is a 1931 play by J.B. Priestley and Edward Knoblock, based on Priestley's 1929 novel of the same title about a touring concert party. The music was composed by Richard Addinsell.

It was first performed at the Princes of Wales's Theatre in Birmingham before beginning its West End run at His Majesty's Theatre before transferring to the Lyric. It lasted for 331 performances between 14 May 1931 and 27 February 1932. The cast included John Gielgud, Adele Dixon, Edward Chapman, Ellen Pollock, Edith Sharpe and Frank Pettingell. Several of the actors reprised their roles for the 1933 film adaptation, notably Gielgud.

A New York production the same year staged by Julian Wylie lasted for 68 performances.

== Bibliography ==
- Wearing, J. P. The London Stage 1930-1939: A Calendar of Productions, Performers, and Personnel. Rowman & Littlefield, 2014.
