= Evensong (play) =

1932 British play

- Written by: Beverley Nichols; Edward Knoblock
- Original language: English
- Genre: Drama

Premiere
- Date premiered: 30 June 1932
- Place premiered: Queen's Theatre, London

Evensong is a 1932 British play by the writers Beverley Nichols and Edward Knoblock. It is based on the novel of the same name by Nichols, based on the life of opera singer Nellie Melba.

It ran for 213 performances at London's Queen's Theatre between 30 June and 31 December 1932. The cast included Edith Evans, Henry Wilcoxon and Wilfrid Lawson. Ernest Irving worked as the film's musical director. The following year it transferred to the Selwyn Theatre on Broadway for a run of 15 performances.

Along with the original novel, the play provided inspiration for the 1934 film version directed by Victor Saville and starring Evelyn Laye.

== Bibliography ==
- Goble, Alan. The Complete Index to Literary Sources in Film. Walter de Gruyter, 1999.
- Wearing, J.P. The London Stage 1930-1939: A Calendar of Productions, Performers, and Personnel. Rowman & Littlefield, 2014.
