= Edward Knoblock =

American-born British writer (1874–1945)

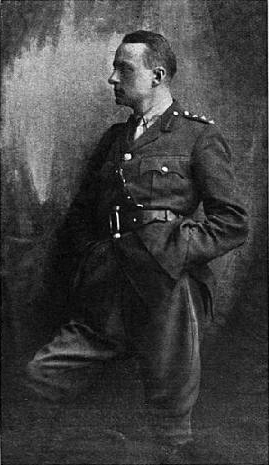
- Captain Edward Knoblock (c. 1918)
- Born: Edward Gustavus Knoblauch; April 7, 1874; New York City, New York, US
- Died: July 19, 1945 (aged 71); London, England
- Occupations: Playwright and novelist

Edward Knoblock (born Edward Gustavus Knoblauch; 7 April 1874 – 19 July 1945) was a playwright and novelist, originally American and later a naturalised British citizen. He wrote numerous plays, often at the rate of two or three a year, of which the most successful were Kismet (1911) and Milestones (1912, co-written with Arnold Bennett). Many of his plays were collaborations, with, among others, Vicki Baum, Beverley Nichols, J. B. Priestley and Vita Sackville-West.

After serving in the British armed forces during the First World War, he combined his theatrical career with work on films, both in Hollywood and the UK. He lived most of his adult life in London, where he died in 1945 at the age of 71.

== Life and career ==
=== Early years ===
Knoblock was born in New York City, the second of the seven children of Carl (Charles) Eduard Knoblauch and his wife, Gertrud, née Wiebe. Knoblock's father was a successful stockbroker with a seat on the New York Stock Exchange. In 1880 Knoblock's mother died suddenly. His father remarried in 1885 but died of acute appendicitis in 1886. Knoblock's American-born stepmother, who had attended music conservatory in Leipzig, took the children to Germany, where his older brother was already in school and where the cost of living was lower. Knoblock spent two years at school in Berlin. A legacy from Charles Knoblauch's maternal uncle in 1890 enabled the family to return to New York, and in 1892 Knoblock went to Harvard, graduating in 1896. See Knoblauch, "Nachrichten aus Manhattan," p. 370–381. Thereafter he spent much of his life in Europe, first in Paris and from 1897 in London.

Determined to pursue a theatrical career, Knoblock, in the words of The Times, "settled down to 14 years of hard and unremunerative work, gaining experience of the theatre by acting as well as by writing, adapting and translating plays". He toured with William Greet's company in The Dovecot, an adaptation of a French comedy (1898); he managed the Avenue Theatre (also 1898); he appeared at the Royalty Theatre in November 1899 as Jo in the premiere of Shaw's You Never Can Tell, and was in the cast at the Adelphi Theatre in Laurence Irving's Bonnie Dundee (1900). His first dramatic work to be staged was a collaboration with Lawrence Sterner, a revised version of the latter's 1895 play The Club Baby, produced at the Avenue in May 1898, running for 39 performances.

=== Early 20th century ===
Between the turn of the century and his breakthrough success in 1911 Knoblock wrote The Partikler Pet (an adaptation of a play by Max Maurey), 1905; The Shulamite, adapted from Alice and Claude Askew's novel, 1906; The Cottage in the Air, adapted from Princess Priscilla's Fortnight, 1909; Sister Beatrice, (a translation of Maurice Maeterlinck's play), 1910; and The Faun 1911. During part of this period he held the post of reader of plays at the Kingsway Theatre, London, where Lena Ashwell and Norman McKinnel were in management together. Knoblock claimed that in eighteen months he read five thousand plays, "and neither lost nor held up a single one of them". In 1909 he returned to Paris, from where he made long visits to Tunis and Kairouan, absorbing the local colour and atmosphere that inspired him to write the play Kismet. It was taken up by Oscar Asche and presented at the Garrick Theatre in 1911, running for 328 performances in its first production, and a further 222 in its first revival, in 1914.

Milestones, 1912

Knoblock's next play was Milestones (1912), co-written with Arnold Bennett. Bennett had tried his hand as a dramatist before, with mixed success, but the combination of his gifts as a story-teller and Knoblock's painstakingly acquired craftsmanship produced a critical and box-office success that made them both a great deal of money. It played at the Royalty for more than 600 performances and ran for more than 200 on Broadway. Laurence Irving is quoted in the Oxford Dictionary of National Biography as saying that Knoblock taught Bennett, and later J. B. Priestley and others "the rudiments of stage carpentry". Between the premiere of Milestones and the First World War Knoblock had three more plays presented in London: Discovering America, (1912); The Headmaster (with Wilfred Coleby, 1913); and My Lady's Dress (1914).

=== First World War and 1920s ===
In August 1914 Knoblock was determined to join the British Army. His friend the novelist Compton Mackenzie held a senior post in military intelligence and secured him a commission. Knoblock served as a captain in the Mediterranean, the Balkans and Greece. In July 1916 he became a naturalised British citizen and the following month he anglicised the spelling of his surname, changing it from Knoblauch to Knoblock.

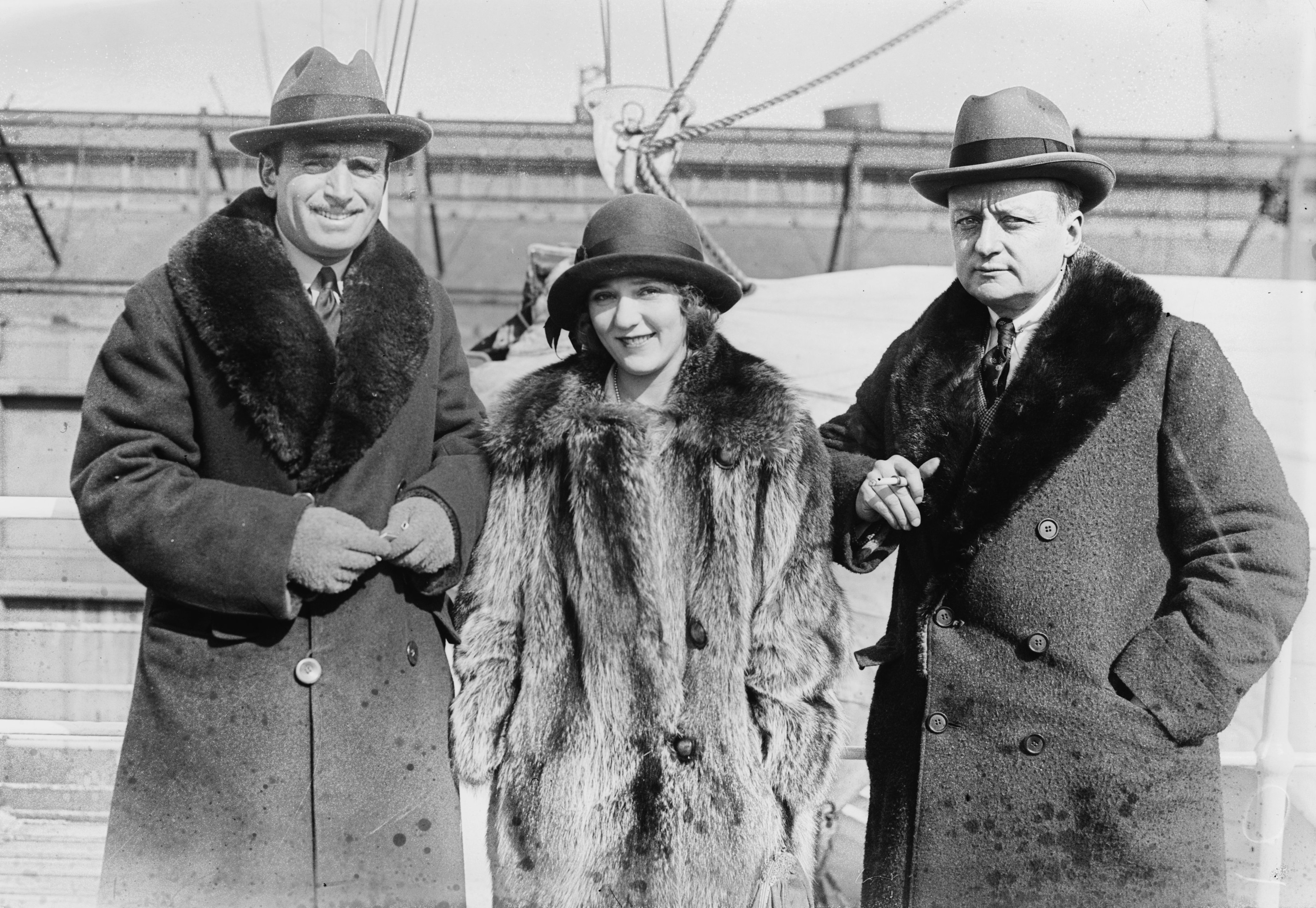
Knoblock, right, with Douglas Fairbanks and Mary Pickford in 1924

During the war years Knoblock continued to write plays: England Expects (with Seymour Hicks, 1914); Hail; Marie-Odile; The Way to Win; A War Committee; How to Get On; Paganini and Mouse (all 1915); The Hawk (from the French) and Home on Leave (both 1916); and Tiger! Tiger! (1918). In 1917 he bought and subsequently restored the Beach House, a Regency building in Worthing, Sussex. His plays of the immediate post-war years were Our Peg (1919); Mumsie, Cherry, and One (all 1920).

After the war Knoblock divided his time between London and Hollywood, where he wrote for the film company of Douglas Fairbanks and Mary Pickford. He adapted The Three Musketeers in 1921, wrote the film Rosita for Pickford (1923), and was a consultant for Fairbanks's 1922 Robin Hood and 1924 The Thief of Baghdad. According to his biographer Eric Salmon he was associated with several other film adaptations during the 1920s and 1930s, although he was evidently not involved with the scripting of any of the 1914, 1920 or 1930 film versions of Kismet.

Knoblock had two more collaborations with Bennett: London Life, an original play (1924) and Mr Prohack (1927), a dramatisation of Bennett's 1922 novel of the same name. His other plays of the 1920s were Simon; Called Peter (with J. E. Goodman, from the novel, 1924); Speakeasy (with George Rosener, 1927); and The Mulberry Bush (1927). At the end of the decade he published his first novel, The Ant Heap (1929).

=== Later years ===
In the 1930s Knoblock collaborated on adaptations of novels with Vicki Baum (Grand Hotel, 1931), Priestley (The Good Companions, 1931), Beverley Nichols (Evensong, 1932) and Vita Sackville-West (The Edwardians, 1934). His other plays from the decade were Hatter's Castle (from A. J. Cronin's novel, 1932) and If a Body (with Rosener, 1935), an experimental Broadway piece in which the six scenes of the play were set on platforms and moved into place in full view of the audience.

For the cinema, Knoblock helped Elinor Glyn with the screenplay for her 1930 film Knowing Men, and was among the screenwriters for Men of Steel (1933), Chu Chin Chow, Evensong and Red Wagon (all 1934), The Amateur Gentleman (1936), Moonlight Sonata (1937) and An Englishman's Home (1939).

In the 1930s and early 1940s Knoblock published three more novels: The Man with Two Mirrors (1931), The Love Lady (1933), and Inexperience (1941). In 1939 he published an autobiography, Round the Room.

Knoblock was the subject of one of the most repeated stories involving the gaffe-prone actor John Gielgud, which Gielgud confessed was true. While the two were lunching together at The Ivy a man passed their table, and Gielgud said, "Thank God he didn't stop, he's a bigger bore than Eddie Knoblock – oh, not you, Eddie!" Asked how Knoblock reacted, Gielgud replied, "He just looked slightly puzzled, and went on boring."

Knoblock died on 19 July 1945 aged 71, at the London home of his sister, the sculptor Gertrude Knoblauch.

== Sources ==
- Croall, Jonathan, ed. (2013). Gielgoodies – The Wit and Wisdom and Gaffes of John Gielgud. London: Oberon Books. ISBN 978-1783190072.
- Gaye, Freda (1967). Who's Who in the Theatre (fourteenth ed.). London: Sir Isaac Pitman and Sons. OCLC 5997224.
- Knoblauch, Susanne C. (2020). Nachrichen aus Manhattan. Münster: LIT Verlag. ISBN 978-3-643-25001-8.
- Parker, John (1922). Who's Who in the Theatre (fourth ed.). London: Sir Isaac Pitman and Sons. OCLC 473894893.
- Parker, John; Freda Gaye; Ian Herbert (1978). Who Was Who in the Theatre. Detroit: Gale Research. OCLC 310466458.
- Wearing, J. P. (2013). The London Stage 1890–1899: A Calendar of Productions, Performers, and Personnel. Lanham: Scarecrow Press. ISBN 978-0-81-089281-1.
