= Conchita Supervía =

Spanish singer

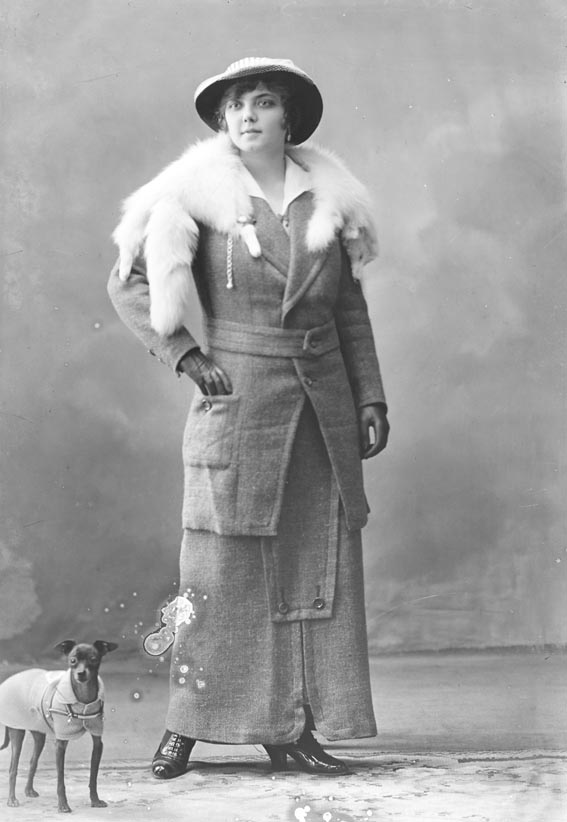
- Supervía c. 1910-1920
- Born: 8–9 December 1895; Barcelona
- Died: March 30, 1936 (aged 40); London
- Occupation: Opera singer

Conchita Supervía (8–9 December 1895 – 30 March 1936) was a highly popular Spanish mezzo-soprano singer who appeared in opera in Europe and America and also gave recitals.

== Early life ==
Supervía was born in Barcelona to an old Andalusian family and given the baptismal name of María de la Concepción Supervía Pascual. She was educated at the local convent but at the age of twelve entered the Conservatori Superior de Música del Liceu in Barcelona to study singing.

== Professional career ==
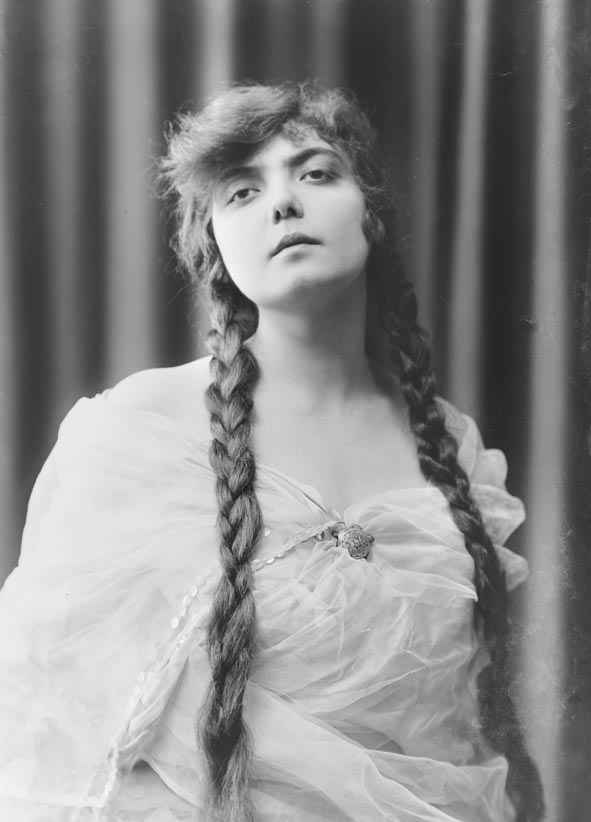

She made her stage debut in 1910 at the young age of 15 at the Teatro Colón, Buenos Aires, Argentina in Stiattesi's Blanca de Beaulieu. Then she sang in Tomás Bretón's Los Amantes de Teruel and as Lola in Mascagni's Cavalleria rusticana.

In 1911 she sang the role of Octavian in the first Italian-language production of Richard Strauss's Der Rosenkavalier at the Teatro Costanzi in Rome. In 1912, she appeared as Carmen at the Gran Teatre del Liceu in her native city, a role with which she would be associated for the rest of her career.

She made her American debut in 1915 as Charlotte in Massenet's Werther at the Chicago Opera, where she also sang in Mignon and Carmen. Back in Europe by the end of the First World War she was invited to Rome, where she started the Rossini revival that made her world-famous – as Angelina in La Cenerentola, Isabella in L'italiana in Algeri and Rosina in Il barbiere di Siviglia, in the original keys.

All in all, she made more than 200 recordings mostly for the Fonotipia and Odeon labels, featuring not only her famous roles in opera but also a vast song repertory in Catalan, Spanish, French, Italian and English, as well as pieces from zarzuela and even operetta (she had appeared in a legendary production of Franz Lehár's Frasquita at the Opéra Comique).

In 1930, she made her London debut at the Queen's Hall. The following year she married Ben Rubenstein, a Jewish businessman from London, and settled there. She already had a teenage son, Giorgio, fruit of a previous union in 1917.

Her Covent Garden debut was in 1934 in La Cenerentola and in 1935 she repeated that part, plus L'Italiana in Algeri and Carmen. In 1934, Supervía appeared in the Victor Saville British motion picture Evensong as a singer named Baba L'Etoile, opposite actor Fritz Kortner.

=== Vocal qualities ===
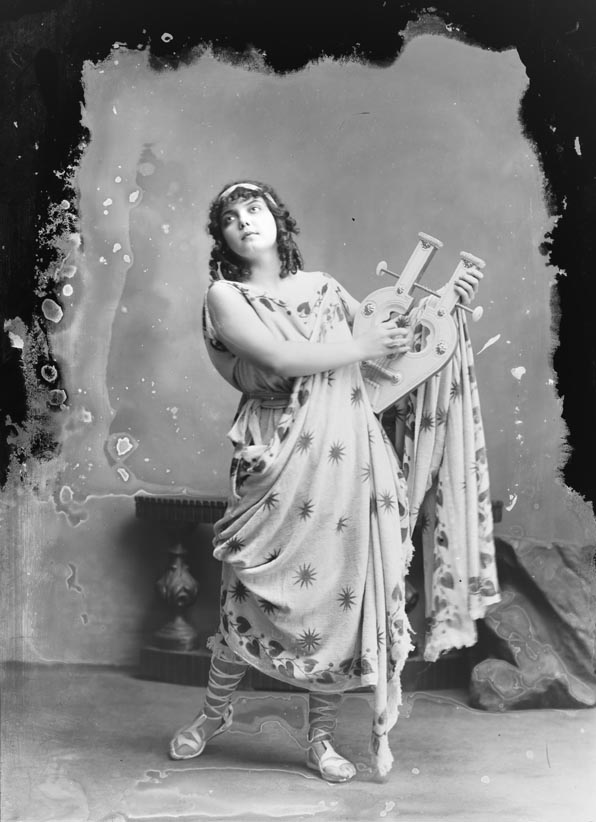

She had a powerful chest register linked to a flexible upper voice that could cope easily with florid passages, allied to a musicianship of great individuality and infectious flair. Her voice was not without its critics; a pronounced vibrato in the lower part of the voice, ‘as strong as the rattle of ice in a glass, or dice in a box’, in a comment attributed to the British critic, Philip Hope-Wallace.

Many who heard her in the flesh have said that this vibrato was more evident on records than on the stage – an example of the microphone exaggerating a singer's faults. In the 1920s Supervía sang at La Scala as Hänsel in Engelbert Humperdinck's Hänsel und Gretel but, strangely, she never sang the Rossini roles or Carmen at La Scala though she sang there in every season until 1929.

== Death ==
Later, during her career, pregnancy forced her to cancel her planned appearances in the autumn of 1935. On 29 March 1936 she entered a London clinic to await the birth of her baby, which was a stillborn girl on 30 March; a few hours later she herself died. She was buried with her baby daughter, in a grave designed by Edwin Lutyens, in the Liberal Jewish Cemetery in Willesden, northwest London. The grave, which had fallen into disrepair, was refurbished by a group of admirers and re-consecrated in October 2006.
