= Separate Tables =

Play written by Terence Rattigan

First edition (publ. Hamish Hamilton, 1955)

Separate Tables is the collective name of two one-act plays by Terence Rattigan, both taking place in the Beauregard Private Hotel, Bournemouth, on the south coast of England. The first play, titled Table by the Window, focuses on the troubled relationship between a disgraced Labour politician and his ex-wife. The second play, Table Number Seven, is set about 18 months after the events of the previous play, and deals with the touching friendship between a repressed spinster and Major Pollock, a kindly but bogus man posing as an upper-class retired army officer. The two main roles in both plays are written to be played by the same performers. The secondary characters – permanent residents, the hotel's manager, and members of the staff – appear in both plays.

== Synopses ==
In Table by the Window, Martin, a once-rising politician now turned to drink, is dining with his ex-wife. Earlier he was sent to prison for beating her. She, having remarried, is now divorced a second time, and seeks a reconciliation with Martin. Miss Cooper, the manager of the hotel, is his mistress. Still, after an off-stage confrontation with the ex-wife, Miss Cooper helps, with great generosity, to bring about a cautious reunion of the formerly married couple.

In Table Number Seven, Major Pollock tries to conceal from his fellow guests a report in the local newspaper of his sexual harassment of women at a local cinema. A repressed and hysterical young woman, under the thumb of her formidable mother, takes his side and falls in love with him. Again Miss Cooper encourages her guests to examine their feelings honestly and face their futures bravely. In an early draft of the play, Rattigan had Major Pollock's misdemeanour not as harassment of women but homosexual importuning; the critic Kenneth Tynan commented at the time of the premiere that the version used then was "as good a handling of sexual abnormality as English playgoers will tolerate."

Tynan also wrote that both plays are about people who are driven by loneliness into a state of desperation.

== Original productions ==
The play premiered at the Opera House in Manchester, Separate Tables then moved to the St James's Theatre in London on 22 September 1954, with the following cast:

- Mrs Shankland and Miss Railton-Bell – Margaret Leighton
- Mr Martin and Major Pollock – Eric Portman
- Mrs Railton-Bell – Phyllis Neilson-Terry
- Miss Cooper – Beryl Measor
- Mabel – Marion Fawcett
- Lady Matheson – Jane Eccles
- Miss Meacham – May Hallatt
- Mr Fowler – Aubrey Mather
- Mr Stratton – Basil Henson
- Miss Tanner – Patricia Rayne

The play was directed by Peter Glenville, with sets by Michael Weight. It opened to good reviews; Harold Hobson called the second play in the double-bill, "one of Rattigan's masterpieces, in which he shows in superlative degree his pathos, his humour and his astounding mastery over [the] English language ...". The production was a commercial success, running for 726 performances.

Separate Tables was presented at the Music Box Theatre in New York on 25 October 1956. It was a transfer of the London production with the same principal players and many of the supporting cast. In The New York Times, Brooks Atkinson wrote "Since Terence Rattigan has written a particularly fine play, it is only fair that it should be wonderfully well acted." The production won one Tony award (for Leighton as best dramatic actress) and was nominated for five more: for the play, the direction, and for three of the supporting cast, Neilson-Terry, Measor and William Podmore (as Fowler).

== Revivals ==
Among stage revivals of the piece are Peter Hall's production at the Albery in London in 1993 with Patricia Hodge and Peter Bowles in the principal roles, and one by the Royal Exchange Theatre, Manchester, in 2006 using the text of Rattigan's alternative draft, with the Major's lapse as a homosexual one.

== Adaptations ==
The 1958 film, with a few extra parts, was adapted for the screen by Rattigan. It starred Rita Hayworth, Deborah Kerr, David Niven, Burt Lancaster and Wendy Hiller. John Schlesinger directed a television film version in 1983, with Julie Christie and Alan Bates as the two couples, with Claire Bloom as Miss Cooper and Irene Worth as Mrs Railton-Bell.

The plays were adapted for television in 1970 as part of the BBC Play of the Month anthology series by Hugh Whitemore. It starred Geraldine McEwan as Sibyl Railton Bell and Anne Shankland, Eric Porter as Major Pollock and John Malcolm and Annette Crosbie as Pat Cooper. Cathleen Nesbitt, who played the role of Lady Matheson in the 1958 film adaptation, resumed the role in this adaptation as well.
