= Thena Jasper =

American actress

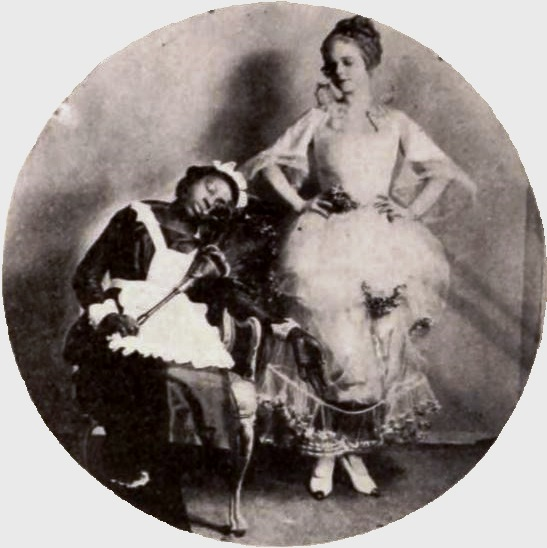
- With Wanda Hawley in The Outside Woman
- Born: 1892; Pennsylvania, US
- Occupation(s): Screen actress, singer
- Spouse: Adolph Jasper

Thena Jasper was an African American singer and actress who worked during Hollywood's silent era.

== Biography ==
A native of Pennsylvania, Jasper moved to Los Angeles with her husband Adolph (a baseball manager) by the early 1910s and began appearing in a string of mostly uncredited roles, often playing maids to wealthy white characters. She once told a reporter, "If I had all the money represented by all the ‘millionaire’ characters I’ve worked for in the pictures, I'd never have to work again.”

== Selected filmography ==
- Under the Lash (1921)
- The Outside Woman (1921)
- The Strange Boarder (1920)
- The Man Who Had Everything (1920)
- The Ladder of Lies (1920)
- Miss Hobbs (1920)
