= Evensong (film) =

- Directed by: Victor Saville
- Written by: Dorothy Farnum
- Based on: play Evensong by Edward Knoblock and Beverley Nichols novel Evensong by Beverley Nichols
- Produced by: Graham Cutts
- Starring: Evelyn Laye
- Cinematography: Mutz Greenbaum
- Edited by: Otto Ludwig
- Music by: Hubert Bath (uncredited)
- Production company: Gaumont British Picture Corporation
- Distributed by: Gaumont British
- Release date: September 1934 (London)
- Running time: 87 minutes
- Country: United Kingdom
- Language: English

Evensong is a 1934 British musical film directed by Victor Saville and starring Evelyn Laye, Fritz Kortner and Emlyn Williams. It is loosely based on the story of the singer Nellie Melba. It was shot at Lime Grove Studios. The film's sets were designed by the art director Alfred Junge.

This movie was the first film of Alec Guinness, who appears as an uncredited extra.

== Cast ==
- Evelyn Laye as Madame Irela
- Fritz Kortner as Arthur Kober
- Emlyn Williams as George Leary
- Carl Esmond as Count Ehrenburg/Archduke Theodore
- Alice Delysia as Madame Valmond
- Conchita Supervia as Baba L'Etoile
- Muriel Aked as Tremlowe
- Dennis Val Norton as Sovino
- Arthur Sinclair as Pa O'Neil
- Patrick O'Moore as Bob O'Neil
- Browning Mummery as solo tenor/Alfredo the Gondolier
- Frederick Leister as Emperor Franz Josef
- George Treger as Solo Gypsy Violinist
- Alec Guinness as Soldier (uncredited)

== Critical reception ==
The New York Times found the film "politely dull in its reverent examination of a songbird's career. But in its sober way it emerges as a superior musical entertainment...Victor Saville tells the story with tenderness, intelligence and skill and his method is technically invigorating in one lengthy sequence which he develops through the use of musical pantomime". Allmovie noted "Evelyn Laye made only a handful of film appearances, of which Evensong was arguably her finest". Time Out found it "a touch more sophisticated than the usual run of homegrown '30s musicals, genre specialist Saville's film benefits no end from the commanding and courageous central performance."
