= London Life (play) =

1924 play by Arnold Bennett and Edward Knoblock

- Written by: Arnold Bennett; Edward Knoblock
- Original language: English
- Genre: Drama

Premiere
- Date premiered: 3 June 1924
- Place premiered: Drury Lane, London

London Life is a 1924 play by Arnold Bennett and Edward Knoblock.

It ran for 36 performances at the Drury Lane Theatre in London's West End. It was produced by Basil Dean. The large cast included Clifford Mollison, Henry Ainley, Gordon Harker, Ian Hunter, Edmund Breon, Mary Jerrold and Olive Sloane. It marked the West End debut of Benita Hume, appearing in a small role.

== Bibliography ==
- J. P. Wearing. The London Stage 1920-1929: A Calendar of Productions, Performers, and Personnel. Rowman & Littlefield, 2014.
