= West London Hospital =

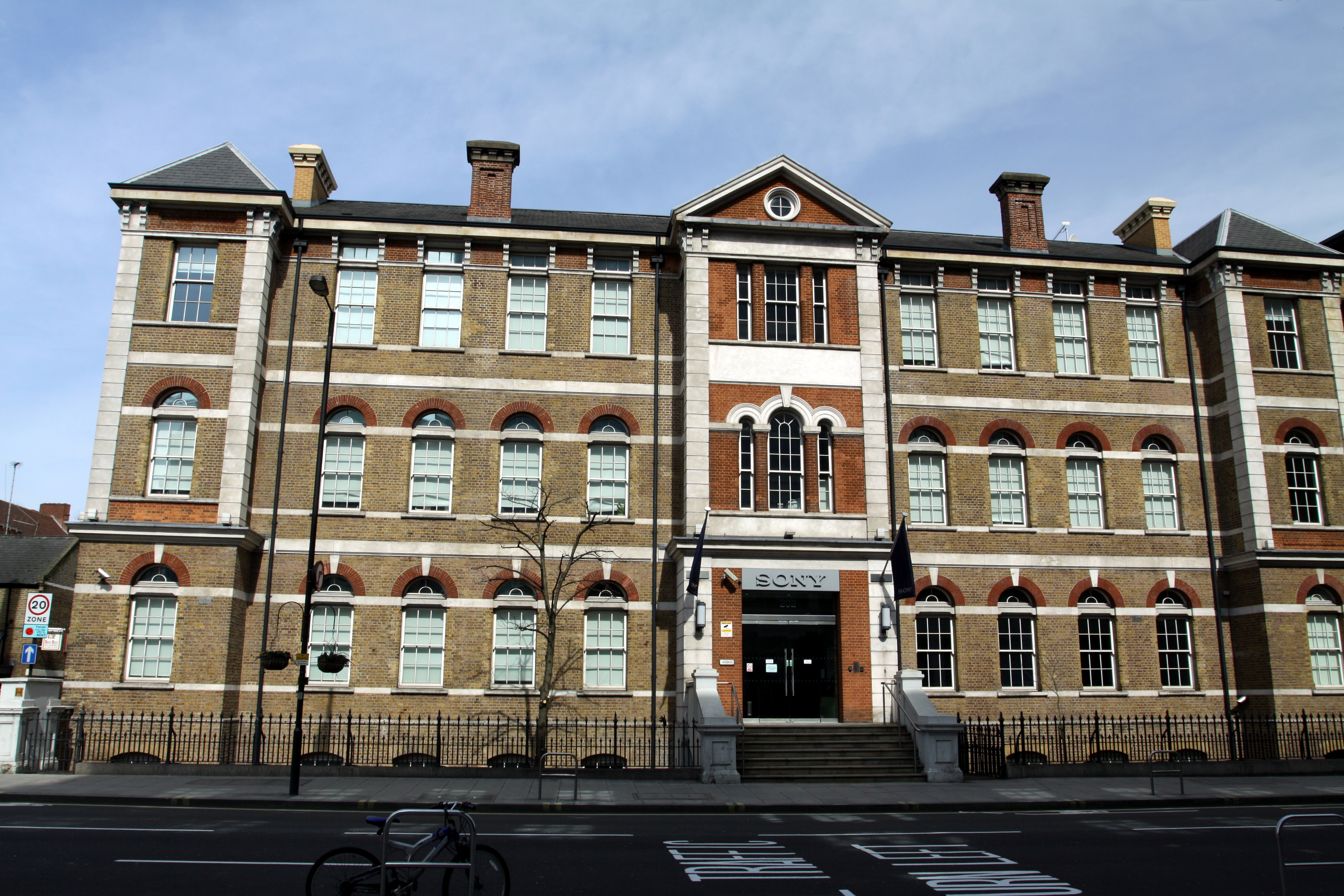
- West London Hospital

- Location within Hammersmith and Fulham

Geography
- Location: Hammersmith, London, England, United Kingdom
- Coordinates: 51.49321°N 0.22210°W

History
- Founded: 1856
- Closed: 1993

Links
- Lists: Hospitals in England

The West London Hospital was founded in 1856 as the Fulham and Hammersmith General Dispensary, which was housed in a small 6-roomed building in Queen Street, Hammersmith. It catered for acute conditions and later for geriatric, maternity, rehabilitation and long-stay conditions.

== History ==
Increasing demand led to the leasing of larger premises of Elm Tree House in Hammersmith Road in 1860. At this time it began to admit in-patients, mainly victims of industrial accidents. In 1863 it was renamed the West London Hospital. It was granted a royal charter on 1 November 1894. During the First World War it was linked to the 4th London General Hospital, and 36 of the West London's beds were reserved for sick and wounded servicemen.

In February 1925 Princess Mary opened a new wing financed by Dan Mason. This had an accident ward of 16 beds, separate cancer wards for male and female patients, each with 7 beds, 26 rooms for private patients and 2 operating theatres. Private patients were charged 5 guineas (£5.25) a week for a single room and 4 guineas (£4.20) for a double room. In 1937 a new block on the eastern corner of the Hospital was added - the Silver Jubilee Extension - and was officially opened by Queen Mary.

The hospital's accident and emergency department closed in the 1970s when Charing Cross Hospital moved from central London to new premises on Fulham Palace Road. In 1993 its remaining services were moved to the Chelsea and Westminster Hospital on Fulham Road. The building was sold and refurbished as offices and named Saunders House. The facade is listed and has been preserved. The building was previously rented by Sony Ericsson, and temporarily renamed Sony Ericsson House; it is now simply known as 202 Hammersmith Road. The freehold is owned by a Middle Eastern investor.

The property is presently the headquarters of Victoria Beckham's fashion brand. It was reported in 2018 that the property had been bought for £16.8 million by the Emirati investment holding company SRG Holding.
