= Lena Ashwell =

British actress and acting manager (1872–1957)

Lena Ashwell, Lady Simson OBE
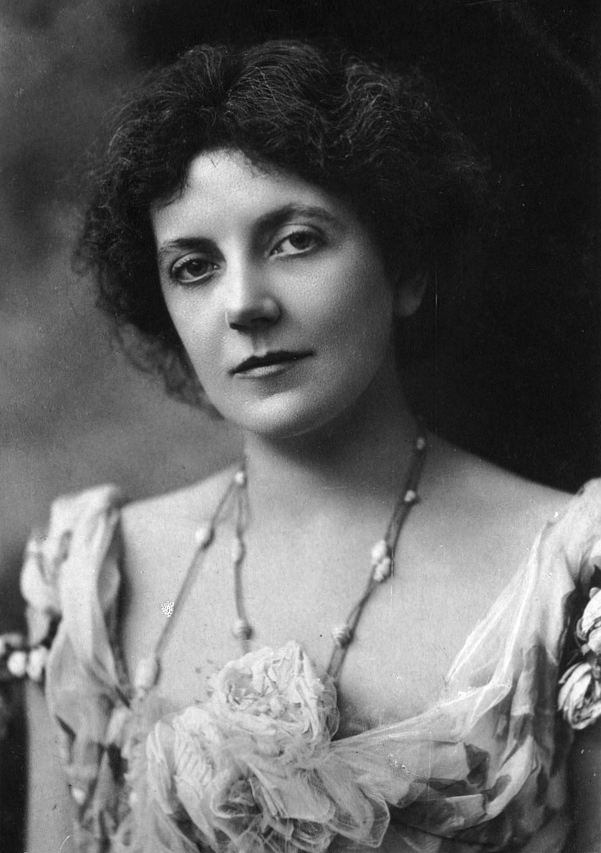
- Born: Lena Margaret Pocock; 28 September 1872; TS Wellesley; River Tyne, North Shields, U.K.
- Died: 13 March 1957 (aged 84)
- Resting place: Dean Cemetery
- Education: Royal Academy of Music
- Occupation: Actress
- Spouses: Arthur Playfair (m. 1896; div. 1908) Sir Henry Simson (m. 1908; died 1932)

Lena Margaret Ashwell, Lady Simson OBE (née Pocock; 28 September 1872 – 13 March 1957) was a British actress and theatre manager and producer, known as the first to organise large-scale entertainment for troops at the front, which she did during World War I. After the war she created the Lena Ashwell Players. For her work during the war, she was appointed an Officer of the Order of the British Empire (OBE).

== Biography ==
She was born Lena Margaret Pocock' on the Wellesley while anchored in the River Tyne at North Shields, at the time under her father's "command" as a home for "boys 'unconvicted of crime' but under suspicion". Ashwell's father was Commander Charles Ashwell Boteler Pocock, Royal Navy (March 1829–February 1899), a nephew of Nicholas Pocock, and her mother was Sarah Margaret Stevens (December 1839–May 1887), who died as a result of an accident in Canada. Lena, the second youngest of seven siblings, had two brothers and four sisters. One of her siblings died as a child while the family was in New Zealand.

She grew up in Canada, and studied music in both Lausanne and at the Royal Academy of Music in London. Her voice however was insufficient for performance and she took up acting instead, thereafter styling herself as "Lena Ashwell". In 1891, she debuted in The Pharisee, and in 1895 she appeared in King Arthur, by J. Comyns Carr, with Ellen Terry, Genevieve Ward and Henry Irving, all wearing costumes made by Ada Nettleship. She went on to appear in a number of Shakespeare productions, in Quo Vadis (1900), and as the lead in Mrs Dane's Defence (1900) and Leah Kleschna (1905).

In 1906, Ashwell starred in The Shulamite, a melodrama about a South African woman in an unhappy marriage who falls in love with a visiting Englishman. The show ran for 45 performances at the Savoy Theatre between 12 May and 26 June 1906.

Ashwell took the play to the US, where it ran for just 25 performances at the Lyric Theatre on Broadway. The New York Times critic wrote that Ashwell "had been rather badly handicapped on her first visit here by a bad play."

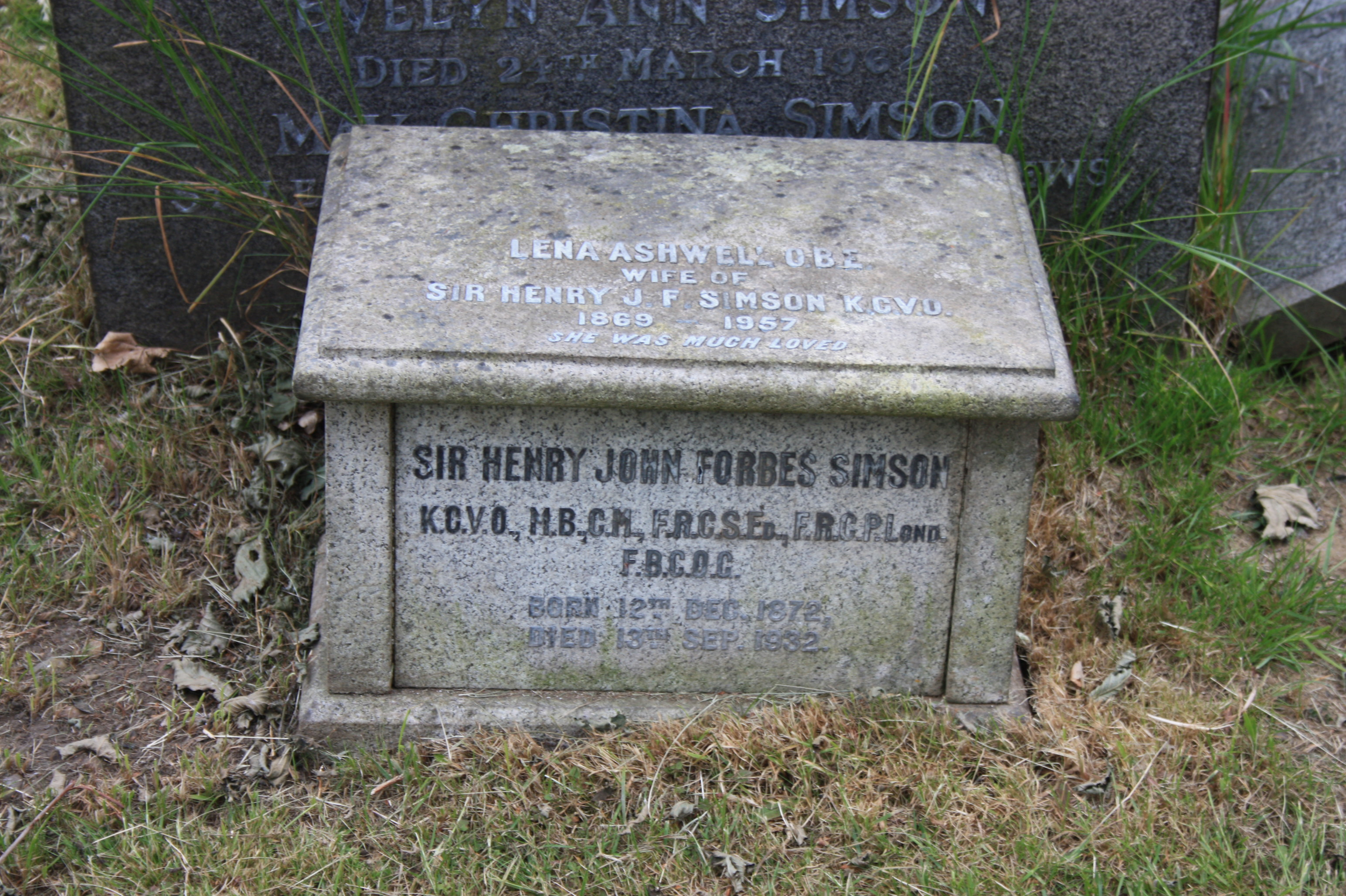
The ashes of Lena Ashwell and Sir Henry Simson, Dean Cemetery

Beginning in 1906, Ashwell took up theatre management, initially at the Savoy Theatre, then in 1907 she established her own theatre known as the Kingsway.

In February 1914, Ashwell was one of the founder members of the new United Suffragists group, led by Frederick and Emmeline Pethick-Lawrence, and the Harbens which broke away from the moderate NUWSS and the militant WSPU suffragettes, although it welcomed former members of each, and men as well as women who were seeking women's rights. When the Representation of the People Act 1918 was passed and (some) women were given the vote, the group disbanded itself.

== World War One ==
During World War I she was an enthusiastic supporter of British war aims. Partly due to the influence of her acquaintance Princess Helena Victoria, and her connections to the YWCA, she was given permission to take a group of entertainers to the Western Front. In 1915, she began to organise companies of actors, singers and entertainers to travel to France and perform; by the end of the war there were 25 of them, travelling in small groups around France. Ashwell herself travelled to the front and became involved in fundraising and logistics of the concerts, as she believed in 'uplifting and therapeutic' power of music. She organised all-male concert parties to perform shows near to the front line. In her writings about this experience she emphasised that ordinary soldiers had been enthusiastic about high culture – in particular, Shakespeare plays. She was appointed an Officer of the Order of the British Empire (OBE) for her efforts in organising such shows.

== After the war ==
After the war Ashwell sought funding from the Carnegie Trust and the British Drama League. After some years the trustees allowed her a £500 grant for capital outlay after get good results of a survey of local councils. The aim was to bring theatre to London, but some areas such as Canning Town were thought to be a very likely loss maker. The Drama League agreed to underwrite up to £100 of losses there. By 1923 there was a "Friends of the Players" with members receiving the "Lena Ashley Players Magazine". Ashwell formed the Lena Ashwell Players Ltd in April 1923. The directors were Ashwell, Esme Church, Marion Fawcett and Cicely Hamilton. The first three of these were to be the company's theatre managers and Fawcett was also the first manager of the new company.

The players continued to appear throughout London and of whom Laurence Olivier was later to become a member. In 1924, she took over the old Bijou Theatre in Bayswater, London and renamed it The Century Theatre. This became the headquarters of The Lena Ashwell Players. It was there that she produced new plays including her own adaptations of Crime and Punishment and Dr. Jekyll and Mr. Hyde.

In her last years, she embraced the Moral Re-Armament movement.

Her ashes are buried with her husband in Dean Cemetery in Edinburgh. The grave lies in the Victorian north extension on a north–south path north of the main path close to Elsie Maud Inglis.

== Family ==
She married actor Arthur Playfair in 1896. He was an alcoholic, committed adultery, domestic violence and passed on venereal disease. He began divorce proceedings in 1903 following her adultery with Robert Taber, the former husband of actress Julia Marlowe. Playfair and Ashwell finally divorced in 1908.

She married the royal obstetrician Sir Henry John Forbes Simson in 1908, who had the claim to fame of delivering both the future Queen Elizabeth II and her sister Princess Margaret. She met him through her cousin, Sir Alfred Fripp, surgeon to the King, who recommended Simson to her.

== Writing ==
Ashwell wrote four books:

- Modern Troubadours (London, Gyldendal, 1922), which is an account of the work of her Concert parties during the First World War
- Reflections from Shakespeare (London, Hutchinson & Co., 1926), edited from a series of lectures she gave to raise money for the Lena Ashwell Players
- The Stage (London, Geoffrey Bles, 1929), her thoughts on the state of the theatre and role of the actor
- An autobiography, Myself A Player (London, Michael Joseph, 1936)
