= Beverley Nichols =

English writer

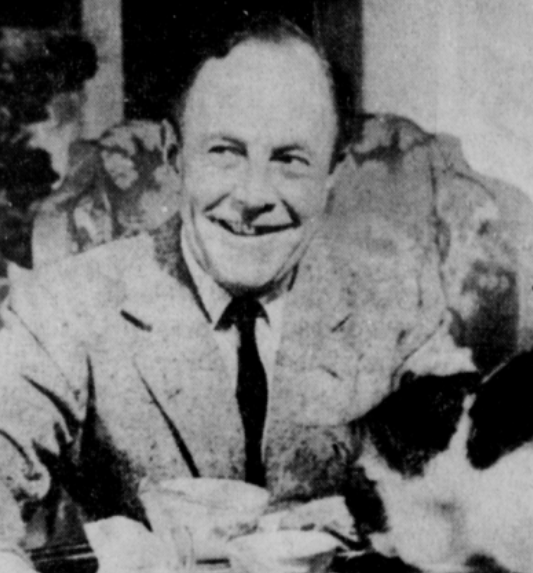
- Photo portrait, 1963
- Born: 9 September 1898; Bower Ashton, Bristol, England
- Died: 15 September 1983 (aged 85); Kingston upon Thames, England
- Resting place: Ashes scattered over St Nicholas's Churchyard, Glatton, England
- Education: Oxford (BA)

John Beverley Nichols (9 September 1898 – 15 September 1983) was an English writer, playwright and public speaker. He wrote more than 60 books and plays.

== Career ==
Between his first book, the novel Prelude (1920), and his last, a book of poetry, Twilight (1982), Nichols wrote more than 60 books. In addition to fiction, essays, theatre scripts and children's books, he wrote non-fiction works on travel, politics, religion, cats, parapsychology, and autobiography. He contributed to many magazines and newspapers throughout his life, notably weekly columns for the Sunday Chronicle newspaper (1932–1943) and Woman's Own magazine (1946–1967).

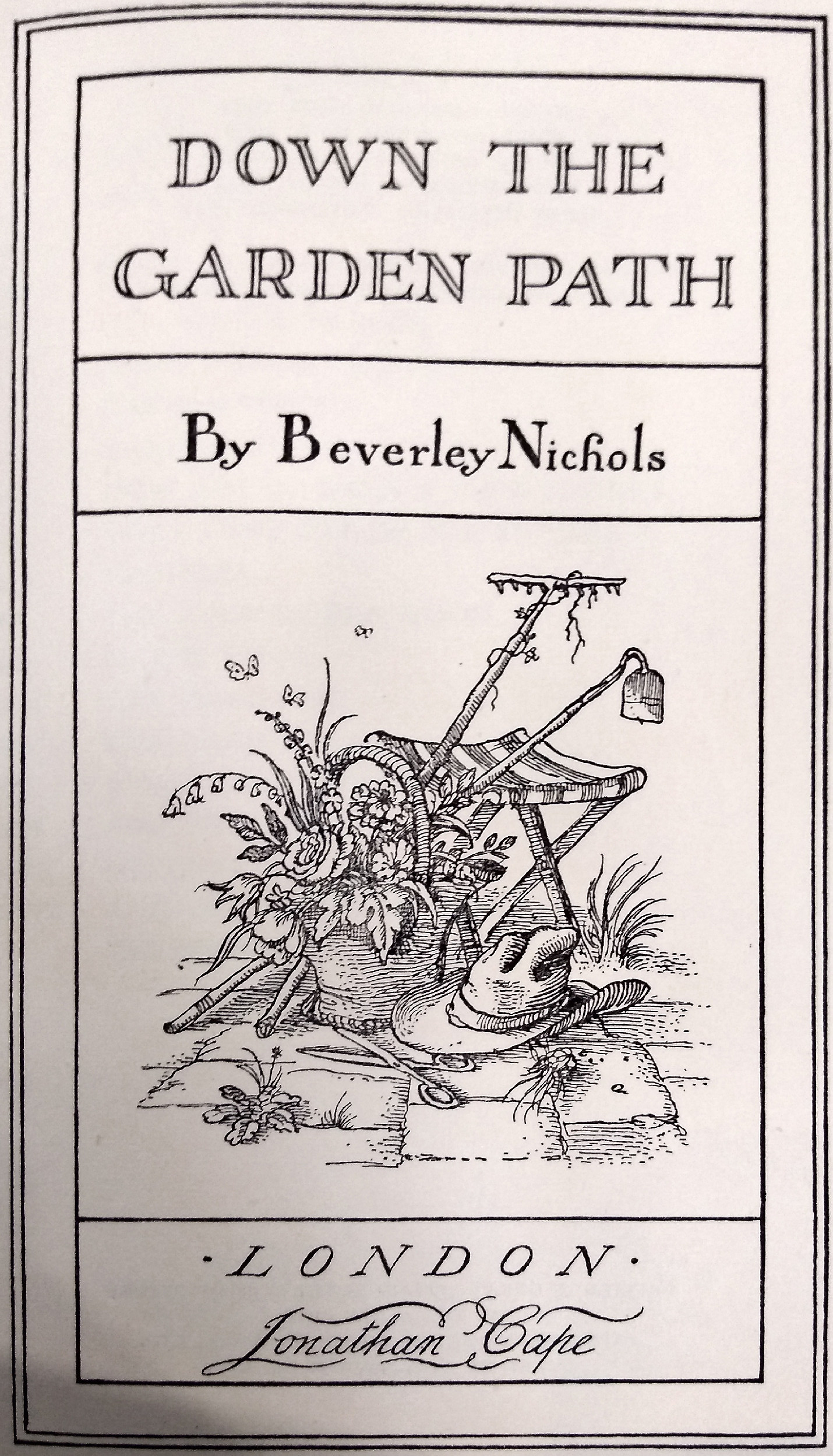
Fontispiece for Down the garden path

Nichols is notable for his books about his homes and gardens, the first of which, Down the Garden Path (1932), was illustrated by Rex Whistler, as were its two sequels. It went through 32 editions and has remained in print almost continuously. The trilogy chronicled the difficulties and delights of maintaining a Tudor thatched cottage in Glatton, Huntingdonshire, the village he fictionalised as Allways. The now Grade II listed house Allways was his home from 1928 to 1937. The three books were so popular that they led to humorous imitations, including Mon Repos (1934) by "Nicholas Bevel" (a parody by Muriel Hine) and Garden Rubbish (1936) by W. C. Sellar and R. J. Yeatman, a satire on garden writers, which included a Nichols-like figure named "Knatchbull Twee."

Nichols' next garden and home book was Green Grows the City (1939), about his modern house and urban garden near Hampstead Heath, London. That book introduced Reginald Arthur Gaskin, Nichols' manservant from 1924 until Gaskin's death in January 1967. Gaskin was a popular character in the book and was included in Nichols' succeeding gardening books.

A second trilogy (1951–1956) began with Merry Hall, documenting Nichols' travails with his extravagant Georgian manor in Agates Lane, Ashtead, Surrey (fictionalised as Meadowstream), where Nichols lived from 1946 to 1956. The books often featured his gifted but laconic gardener "Oldfield". Nichols' final trilogy (1963–1968) chronicled his adapting to a more modest living arrangement, beginning in 1958, in a late 18th-century attached cottage ("Sudbrook") at Ham, near Richmond, Surrey. This was Nichols' final home and garden, where he lived for 25 years until his death in 1983. Illustrations and dust jacket designs for these later volumes were provided by William McLaren.

Nichols wrote on a wide range of subjects. He ghostwrote Dame Nellie Melba's 1925 "autobiography" Memories and Melodies (he was at the time her personal secretary, and his 1933 book Evensong was believed to be based on aspects of her life). In 1933, Nichols wrote a bestseller advocating pacifism, Cry Havoc!, which sparked intense debate in Britain and North America. In Cry Havoc! Nichols said that by the time the book went to the press the new dictator of Germany, Adolf Hitler, might be exiled or might have rejected the extremist elements in the Nazi party. Francis Yeats-Brown wrote Dogs of War (1934) as a rebuttal of Nichols's pacifism and called him a public danger.

In his 1938 work News of England, Nichols said the leader of the British Union of Fascists, Oswald Mosley, was a potential leader who could unite Britain and prevent war but was critical of Mosley's antisemitism. Nichols worked for the Anglo-German Fellowship in an effort to improve Anglo-Germans relations and delivered speeches to the Hitler Youth during his visits to Germany, in which he advocated peace. By 1938, he had abandoned his pacifism, and he supported the Allies in the Second World War.

Nichols criticised Hinduism and Mahatma Gandhi in Verdict on India (1944), and advocated the partition of India as the solution to Hindu-Muslim antagonism. He labelled the Indian National Congress as fascist and argued that they were aiding the Japanese enemy by advocating civil disobedience to British rule. He also put the case for the creation of Pakistan on the grounds of self-determination. The book became a bestseller and was praised by the All-India Muslim League but was opposed by Congress.

In 1966 he wrote A Case of Human Bondage about the marriage and divorce of writer W. Somerset Maugham and his wife, interior decorator Syrie Maugham, which was highly critical of Maugham. He was disappointed by the reception of Powers That Be (1966), a book about spiritualism. Father Figure (1972), in which Nichols described how he tried to murder his alcoholic, abusive father, caused uproar and calls for his prosecution.

Nichols was also a mystery writer. His five detective novels (1954–1960) featured a middle-aged private detective of independent means called Horatio Green.

Apart from authorship, Nichols' main interest was gardening, especially garden design and winter flowers. His many acquaintances in all walks of life included some famous gardeners, such as Constance Spry and Lord Aberconway, President of the Royal Horticultural Society and owner of Bodnant Garden in North Wales. In 2009 Timber Press, which have reprinted a number of Nichols' titles, published a book called Rhapsody in Green: The Garden Wit and Wisdom of Beverley Nichols, edited by Roy C. Dicks.

Nichols made one film appearance, in Glamour (1931), directed by Seymour Hicks and Harry Hughes, playing the small part of the Hon. Richard Wells. The film is now lost.

== Personal life ==
Nichols was at school at Marlborough College before proceeding to Balliol College, Oxford in January 1917. His education was interrupted by military service with the Intelligence section at the War Office, as an instructor to an Officer Cadet Battalion in Cambridge, and as aide-de-camp to Arthur Shipley on the British University Mission to the United States. Nichols then returned to Oxford, where he was President of the Oxford Union and editor of Isis. In 1920 he passed the Shortened Honours degree in Modern History.

Nichols was homosexual and probably had a brief affair with the war poet Siegfried Sassoon, according to a Sassoon biographer. Nichols' long-term companion was the actor and director Cyril Butcher, the main beneficiary of Nichols' will, amounting to £131,750.

Nichols died on 15 September 1983 and his ashes were scattered over St Nicholas' Churchyard, Glatton, Cambridgeshire, England.

== Selected bibliography ==
=== Essays and journalism ===
- Are They The Same at Home? Being a Series of Bouquets Diffidently Distributed (1927)
- The Star Spangled Manner (1928)
- Women and Children Last (1931)
- For Adults Only (1932)
- Cry Havoc! (1933)
- News of England or a Country Without a Hero (1938)
- Verdict on India (1944)
- Men Do Not Weep (1941)
- Uncle Samson (1950)
- The Queen's Coronation Day: The Pictorial Record of the Great Occasion (1953)

=== Gardening, homes and restoration ===
- Down the Garden Path (1932) ISBN 978-0-88192-710-8
- A Thatched Roof (1933) ISBN 978-0-88192-728-3
- A Village in a Valley (1934) ISBN 978-0-88192-729-0
- How Does Your Garden Grow? (1935)
- Green Grows the City: The Story of a London Garden (1939) ISBN 978-0-88192-779-5
- Merry Hall (1951) ISBN 978-0-88192-804-4
- Laughter on the Stairs (1953) ISBN 978-0-88192-460-2
- Sunlight on the Lawn (1956) ISBN 978-0-88192-467-1
- Garden Open Today (1963) ISBN 978-0-88192-533-3
- Forty Favourite Flowers (1964)
- The Art of Flower Arrangement (1967)
- Garden Open Tomorrow (1968) ISBN 978-0-88192-552-4
- The Gift of a Garden; or Some Flowers Remembered (1971)
- The Gift of a Home (1972)

=== Novels ===
- Prelude (1920) (reprinted in 2007) ISBN 0-548-75213-3)
- Patchwork (1921)
- Self (1922)
- Crazy Pavements (1927)
- Evensong (1932), filmed in 1934
- Revue (1939)

=== Mysteries ===
- No Man's Street (1954)
- The Moonflower (1955) (a.k.a. The Moonflower Murder)
- Death to Slow Music (1956)
- The Rich Die Hard (1957)
- Murder by Request (1960)

=== Cats ===
- Beverley Nichols' Cat Book (1955)
- Beverley Nichols' Cats A.B.C. (1960)
- Beverley Nichols' Cats X.Y.Z. (1961)
- Cats' A-Z (1977)

=== Religion ===
- The Fool Hath Said (1936)
- A Pilgrim's Progress (1952)

=== Spiritualism ===
- Powers That Be (1966)

=== Humour ===
- The Valet as Historian (1934)

=== Plays and poetry ===
- Failures: Three Plays (1933)
  - The Stag (produced 1929)
  - Avalanche (produced 1931)
  - When the Crash Comes (produced 1933)
- Evensong (produced 1932, published 1933)
- A Book of Old Ballads (editor, 1934) with illustrations by H. M. Brock
- Mesmer (produced 1935, published 1937)
- Shadow of the Vine (published 1949, produced 1954)
- Twilight: First and Probably Last Poems (1982)

=== Autobiographies ===
- 25: Being a Young Man's Candid Recollections of his Elders and Betters (1926); also titled Twenty-Five
- All I Could Never Be: Some Recollections (1949)
- The Sweet and Twenties (1958)
- Father Figure (1972)
- Down the Kitchen Sink (1974)
- The Unforgiving Minute: Some Confessions from Childhood to the Outbreak of the Second World War (1978)

=== Biography ===
- A Case of Human Bondage: The Tragic Marriage of Somerset Maugham (1966)

=== Children's books ===
- The Tree that Sat Down (1945)
- The Stream that Stood Still (1948)
- The Mountain of Magic (1950)
- The Wickedest Witch in the World (1971)

=== Travel ===
- No Place Like Home (1936)
- The Sun in My Eyes or How Not to Go Around the World (1969)

=== In collaboration ===
- Butcher, Cyril. In Extremis, Worst Moments in the Lives of the Famous (1934), with a foreword by Beverley Nichols
- Yours Sincerely (1947), in collaboration with Monica Dickens
