= List of plays adapted into feature films: J to Q =

This is a list of plays that have been adapted into feature films, whose titles fall into the J to Q alphabetic range. Entries are sorted alphabetically by the title of the play. The title of the play is followed by its first public performance, its playwright, the title of the film adapted from the play, the year of the film and the film's director. If a film has an alternate title based on geographical distribution, the title listed will be that of the widest distribution area. This is a dynamic list and may never be complete. It is limited to entries in which either the play or its film adaptation have an existing article on the English-language Wikipedia. It does not include films based on plays with an unknown title. See also List of plays adapted into feature films: A to I and List of plays adapted into feature films: R to Z.

== List of plays adapted into feature films ==
=== J ===
Play	Playwright	Film	Film director
Jack Goes Boating (2007)	Robert Glaudini	Jack Goes Boating (2010)	Philip Seymour Hoffman
Jack Straw (1908)	W. Somerset Maugham	Jack Straw (1920)	William C. deMille
Jack Tar (1896)	Ben Landeck; Arthur Shirley	Jack Tar (1915)	Bert Haldane
Jacobowsky und der Oberst	Franz Werfel	Me and the Colonel (1958)	Peter Glenville
Jacques Brel is Alive and Well and Living in Paris	Eric Blau; Mort Shuman	Jacques Brel Is Alive and Well and Living in Paris (1975)	Denis Héroux
Jagdszenen aus Niederbayern (1965)	Martin Sperr	Hunting Scenes from Bavaria (1969)	Peter Fleischmann
Jake's Women (1992)	Neil Simon	Jake's Women (1996)	Glenn Jordan
Jane (1890)	William Lestocq; Harry Nicholls	Jane (1915)	Frank Lloyd
Janice Meredith (1900)	Paul Leicester Ford; Edward Everett Rose	Janice Meredith (1924)	
Janie (1942)	Josephine Bentham; Herschel V. Williams Jr.	Janie (1944)	Michael Curtiz
The Jazz Singer (1925)	Samson Raphaelson	The Jazz Singer (1927)	Alan Crosland
The Jazz Singer (1925)	Samson Raphaelson	The Jazz Singer (1952)	Michael Curtiz
The Jazz Singer (1925)	Samson Raphaelson	The Jazz Singer (1980)	Richard Fleischer
Jean	Ladislaus Bus-Fekete	The Baroness and the Butler (1938)	Walter Lang
Jean le cocher (1852)	Joseph Bouchardy	The Courier of Moncenisio (1927)	Baldassarre Negroni
Jeanne d'Arc au bûcher (1938)	Paul Claudel	Joan of Arc at the Stake (1954)	Roberto Rossellini
Jeannie (1940)	Aimée Stuart	Jeannie (1941)	Harold French
Jeannie (1940)	Aimée Stuart	Let's Be Happy (1957)	Henry Levin
Jedermann (1911)	Hugo von Hofmannsthal	Jedermann (1961)	Gottfried Reinhardt
Jeffrey (1992)	Paul Rudnick	Jeffrey (1995)	Christopher Ashley
Jennie's Story (1981)	Betty Lambert	Heart of the Sun (1998)	Francis Damberger
Jeppe on the Hill (1722)	Ludvig Holberg	Jeppe på bjerget (1933)	Per Aabel; Harry Ivarson
Jeppe on the Hill (1722)	Ludvig Holberg	Jeppe på bjerget (1981)	Kaspar Rostrup
The Jester's Supper (1909)	Sem Benelli	The Jester's Supper (1942)	Alessandro Blasetti
The Jest of Haha Laba	Lord Dunsany	It Happened Tomorrow (1944)	René Clair
Jewel Robbery (1931)	Ladislas Fodor	The Peterville Diamond (1942)	Walter Forde
The Jeweler's Shop	Karol Józef Wojtyła (Pope John Paul II)	The Jeweller's Shop (1988)	Michael Anderson
The Jewess of Toledo (1872)	Franz Grillparzer	The Jewess of Toledo (1919)	Otto Kreisler
Jezebel (1933)	Owen Davis	Jezebel (1938)	William Wyler
The Joan Danvers (1916)	Frank Stayton	A Gamble in Lives (1920)	George Ridgwell
Joan of Lorraine (1946)	Maxwell Anderson	Joan of Arc (1948)	Victor Fleming
John Loves Mary (1947}	Norman Krasna	John Loves Mary (1949)	David Butler
Johnny Belinda (1940)	Elmer Blaney Harris	Johnny Belinda (1948)	Jean Negulesco
Johnny Belinda (1940)	Elmer Blaney Harris	Johnny Belinda (1967)	Paul Bogart
Journey's End (1928)	R. C. Sherriff	Aces High (1976)	Jack Gold
Journey's End (1928)	R. C. Sherriff	Journey's End (1930)	James Whale
Journey's End (1928)	R. C. Sherriff	The Other Side (1931)	Heinz Paul
Journey's End (1928)	R. C. Sherriff	Journey's End (2017)	Saul Dibb
Juan José (1895)	Joaquín Dicenta	Life (1928)	Adelqui Migliar
Juarez and Maximilian (1925)	Franz Werfel	Juarez (1939)	William Dieterle
Judah (1890)	Henry Arthur Jones	The Cheater (1920)	Henry Otto
Judgment at Nuremberg (1959)	Abby Mann	Judgment at Nuremberg (1961)	Stanley Kramer
Judith and the Holofernes (1896)	Thomas Bailey Aldrich	Judith of Bethulia (1914)	D. W. Griffith
Juicy and Delicious (2007)	Lucy Alibar	Beasts of the Southern Wild (2012)	Benh Zeitlin
Julius Caesar (1599)	'William Shakespeare	Julius Caesar (1914 film)	Enrico Guazzoni
Julius Caesar (1599)	'William Shakespeare	Julius Caesar (1950)	David Bradley
Julius Caesar (1599)	'William Shakespeare	An Honourable Murder (1960)	Godfrey Grayson
Julius Caesar (1599)	'William Shakespeare	Julius Caesar (1970)	Stuart Burge
Julius Caesar (1599)	'William Shakespeare	Caesar Must Die (2012)	Paolo Taviani; Vittorio Taviani
Julius Caesar (1599)	'William Shakespeare	Zulfiqar (2016)	Srijit Mukherji
Jump (2006)	Lisa McGee	Jump (2012)	Kieron J. Walsh
June Moon (1929)	George S. Kaufman; Ring Lardner	June Moon (1931)	A. Edward Sutherland
Junior Miss (1941)	Jerome Chodorov; Joseph Fields	Junior Miss (1945)	George Seaton
Juno and the Paycock (1924)	Seán O'Casey	Juno and the Paycock (1930)	Alfred Hitchcock
Jupiter Laughs (1940)	A. J. Cronin	Shining Victory (1925)	Irving Rapper
The Just Assassins (1949)	Albert Camus	Bajo la metralla (1983)	Felipe Cazals
Just a Wife (1910)	Eugene Walter	Just a Wife (1920)	Howard C. Hickman
Just a Woman (1916)	Eugene Walter	Just a Woman (1918)	Julius Steger
Just a Woman (1916)	Eugene Walter	Just a Woman (1925)	Irving Cummings
Just a Woman (1916)	Eugene Walter	No Other Woman (1933)	J. Walter Ruben
Just Suppose (1920)	Albert E. Thomas	Just Suppose (1926)	Kenneth Webb
Justice (1910)	John Galsworthy	Justice (1917)	Maurice Elvey
Juurakon Hulda (1937)	Hella Wuolijoki	The Farmer's Daughter (1947 film) (1947)	H. C. Potter

=== K ===
Play	Playwright	Film	Film director
Kanjinchō (1840)	Namiki Gohei III	The Men Who Tread on the Tiger's Tail (1945)	Akira Kurosawa
Katharina Knie (1928)	Carl Zuckmayer	Katharina Knie (1929)	Karl Grune
Kathleen Mavourneen	Dion Boucicault	Kathleen Mavourneen (1906)	Edwin S. Porter
Kathleen Mavourneen	Dion Boucicault	Kathleen Mavourneen (1913)	Herbert Brenon
Kathleen Mavourneen	Dion Boucicault	Kathleen Mavourneen (1919)	Charles J. Brabin
Kathleen Mavourneen	Dion Boucicault	Kathleen Mavourneen (1930)	Albert Ray
Kathleen Mavourneen	Dion Boucicault	Kathleen Mavourneen (1937)	Norman Lee
Kauboji (2008)	Saša Anočić	Cowboys (2013)	Tomislav Mršić
Kean (1836)	Alexandre Dumas	Kean (1921 film)	Rudolf Biebrach
Kean (1836)	Alexandre Dumas	A Stage Romance (1922) (1922)	Herbert Brenon
Kean (1836)	Alexandre Dumas	Kean (1924 film)	Alexandre Volkoff
Kean (1836)	Alexandre Dumas	Kean (1940 film)	Guido Brignone
Kean (1836)	Alexandre Dumas	Kean: Genius or Scoundrel (1956)	Vittorio Gassman
Keane of Kalgoorlie (1908)	Edward William O'Sullivan; Arthur Wright	Keane of Kalgoorlie (1911)	John Gavin
Keepers of Youth (1929)	Arnold Ridley	Keepers of Youth (1932)	Thomas Bentley
Kelinlar qoʻzgʻoloni (1976)	Said Ahmad	The Rebellion of the Brides (1984)	Melis Abzalov
Key Largo (1939)	Maxwell Anderson	Key Largo (1948)	John Huston
Khanuma (1882)	Avksenty Tsagareli	Khanuma (1978)	Georgy Tovstonogov
The Kibitzer (1929)	Jo Swerling; Edward G. Robinson	The Kibitzer (1930)	Edward Sloman
Kick In (1914)	Willard Mack	Kick In (1917)	George Fitzmaurice
Kick In (1914)	Willard Mack	Kick In (1922)	George Fitzmaurice
Kick In (1914)	Willard Mack	Kick In (1931)	Richard Wallace
Kiki (1918)	André Picard	Kiki (1926)	Clarence Brown
Kiki (1918)	André Picard	Kiki (1931)	Sam Taylor
Killer Joe (1993)	Tracy Letts	Killer Joe (2011)	William Friedkin
The Killing of Sister George (1964)	Frank Marcus	The Killing of Sister George (1968)	Robert Aldrich
Kill Me, Deadly (2009)	Bill Robens	Kill Me, Deadly (2015)	Darrett Sanders
Kind Lady (1935)	Edward Chodorov	Kind Lady (1935)	George B. Seitz
Kind Lady (1935)	Edward Chodorov	Kind Lady (1951)	John Sturges
Kind Sir (1953)	Norman Krasna	Indiscreet (1958)	Stanley Donen
King Charles III (2014)	Mike Bartlett	King Charles III (2017)	Rupert Goold
King Dave (2005)	Alexandre Goyette	King Dave (2016)	Daniel Grou
King John (1598)	William Shakespeare	King John (1899)	William Kennedy Dickson; Walter Pfeffer Dando
King John (1598)	William Shakespeare	Said-e-Havas (1936)	Sohrab Modi
King John (1598)	William Shakespeare	King John (2015)	Tim Carroll
King Lear (1605)	William Shakespeare	King Lear (1910)	Gerolamo Lo Savio
King Lear (1605)	William Shakespeare	King Lear (1916)	Ernest C. Warde
King Lear (1605)	William Shakespeare	Gunasundari Katha (1949)	K. V. Reddy
King Lear (1605)	William Shakespeare	King Lear (1953)	Peter Brook
King Lear (1605)	William Shakespeare	Guna Sundari (1955)	Kamalakara Kameswara Rao
King Lear (1605)	William Shakespeare	King Lear (1971, British made)	Peter Brook
King Lear (1605)	William Shakespeare	King Lear (1971, Soviet made)	Grigori Kozintsev
King Lear (1605)	William Shakespeare	Ran (1985)	Akira Kurosawa
King Lear (1605)	William Shakespeare	King Lear (1987)	Jean-Luc Godard
King Lear (1605)	William Shakespeare	Gypsy Lore (1997)	Bence Gyöngyössy
King Lear (1605)	William Shakespeare	King Lear (1999)	Brian Blessed
King Lear (1605)	William Shakespeare	My Kingdom (2001)	Don Boyd
King Lear (1605)	William Shakespeare	King of Texas (2002)	Uli Edel
King Lear (1605)	William Shakespeare	Second Generation (2003)	Jon Sen
King Lear (1605)	William Shakespeare	King Lear (2008)	Trevor Nunn
King Lear (1605)	William Shakespeare	King Lear (2015)	Antoni Cimolino
King Lear (1605)	William Shakespeare	The Lears (2017)	Carl Bessai
King Lear (1605)	William Shakespeare	King Lear (2018)	Richard Eyre
King of Hearts (1954)	Jean Kerr; Eleanor Brooke	That Certain Feeling (1956)	Norman Panama; Melvin Frank
Kismet (1911)	Edward Knoblock	Kismet (1920)	Louis J. Gasnier
Kismet (1911)	Edward Knoblock	Kismet (1930)	John Francis Dillon
Kismet (1911)	Edward Knoblock	Kismet (1931)	William Dieterle
Kismet (1911)	Edward Knoblock	Kismet (1944)	William Dieterle
Kismet (1953)	Charles Lederer; Luther Davis	Kismet (1955)	Vincente Minnelli
Kismet (1953)	Charles Lederer; Luther Davis	Kismet (1967)	Bob Henry
Kiss and Tell (1943)	F. Hugh Herbert	Kiss and Tell (1945)	Richard Wallace
The Kiss Before the Mirror (1932)	Ladislas Fodor	The Kiss Before the Mirror (1933)	James Whale
The Kiss Before the Mirror (1932)	Ladislas Fodor	Wives Under Suspicion (1938)	James Whale
Kiss the Boys Goodbye (1938)	Clare Boothe Luce	Kiss the Boys Goodbye (1941)	Victor Schertzinger
Kiss Them for Me (1945)	Luther Davis	Kiss Them for Me (1957)	Stanley Donen
The Kitchen (1957)	Arnold Wesker	The Kitchen (1961)	James Hill
Knickerbocker Holiday (1938)	Maxwell Anderson	Knickerbocker Holiday (1944)	Harry Joe Brown
Kolportage (1924)	Georg Kaiser	The Farmer from Texas (1925)	Joe May
Kongo (1926)	Charles de Vonde; Kilbourn Gordon	West of Zanzibar (1928 film)	Tod Browning
Kongo (1926)	Charles de Vonde; Kilbourn Gordon	Kongo (1932)	William J. Cowen
Konig Harlekin (1900)	Rudolf Lothar	The Magic Flame (1927)	Henry King
Kosher Kitty Kelly	Leon De Costa	Kosher Kitty Kelly (1926)	James W. Horne
Kozmetika	István Békeffy	Kiss and Make-Up (1934)	Harlan Thompson
Krach um Jolanthe	August Hinrichs	Trouble with Jolanthe (1934)	Carl Froelich
Krach um Jolanthe	August Hinrichs	The Happy Village (1955)	Rudolf Schündler
Krach um Jolanthe	August Hinrichs	Jolanta the Elusive Pig (1945)	Hugo Bolander; Oscar Winge
Krechinsky's Wedding (1854)	Aleksandr Sukhovo-Kobylin	The Marriage of Krechinsky (1908)	Alexander Drankov
Krechinsky's Wedding (1854)	Aleksandr Sukhovo-Kobylin	Krechinsky's Wedding (1953)	Vasili Vanin
Kyrsyä	Neea Viitamäki	Kyrsyä – Tuftland (2017)	Roope Olenius

=== L ===
Play	Playwright	Film	Film director
La banque Nemo (1931)	Louis Verneuil	Nemo's Bank (1934)	Marguerite Viel
La Bataille de dames, ou un duel en amour (1851)	Ernest Legouvé; Eugène Scribe	Devil-May-Care (1929)	Sidney Franklin
La bella addormentata (1919)	Pier Maria Rosso di San Secondo	Sleeping Beauty (1942)	Luigi Chiarini
La Belle Aventure (1912)	Gaston Arman de Caillavet; Robert de Flers; Étienne Rey	The Beautiful Adventure (1932, French language)	Roger Le Bon; Reinhold Schünzel
La Belle Aventure (1912)	Gaston Arman de Caillavet; Robert de Flers; Étienne Rey	The Beautiful Adventure (1932, German language)	Reinhold Schünzel
La Belle Aventure (1912)	Gaston Arman de Caillavet; Robert de Flers; Étienne Rey	The Beautiful Adventure (1942)	Marc Allégret
La belle marinière (1929)	Marcel Achard	The Beautiful Sailor (1932)	Harry Lachman
La Belle Russe (1882)	David Belasco	La Belle Russe (1919)	Charles Brabin
Laburnum Grove (1933)	J. B. Priestley	Laburnum Grove (1936)	Carol Reed
La bohème	Luigi Illica; Giuseppe Giacosa	La Bohème (1926)	King Vidor
La bugiarda (1956)	Diego Fabbri	Six Days a Week (1965)	Luigi Comencini
La Cage aux Folles (1973)	Jean Poiret	La Cage aux Folles (1978)	Édouard Molinaro
La Cage aux Folles (1973)	Jean Poiret	The Birdcage (1996)	Mike Nichols
La Calandria	Bernardo Dovizi	La calandria (1972)	Pasquale Festa Campanile
La casa de salud (1922)	Joaquín Dicenta; Alfonso Paso	Unexpected Conflict (1948)	Ricardo Gascón
La Chienne (1930)	André Mouëzy-Éon	La Chienne (1931)	Jean Renoir
La Chienne (1930)	André Mouëzy-Éon	Scarlet Street (1945)	Fritz Lang
Lackawanna Blues (2001)	Ruben Santiago-Hudson	Lackawanna Blues (2005)	George C. Wolfe
La Couturière de Lunéville (1923)	Alfred Savoir	The Dressmaker of Luneville (1932)	Harry Lachman
La Couturière de Lunéville (1923)	Alfred Savoir	Dressed to Thrill (1935, musical)	Harry Lachman
La Cuisine Des Anges (1952)	Albert Husson	We're No Angels (1955)	Michael Curtiz
La dama de armiño (1922)	Luis Fernández Ardavín	Lady in Ermine (1947)	Eusebio Fernández Ardavín
La Dame de chez Maxim (1899)	Georges Feydeau	La dama de Chez Maxim's (1923)	Amleto Palermi
La Dame de chez Maxim (1899)	Georges Feydeau	La dame de chez Maxim's (1933)	Alexander Korda
La Dame de chez Maxim (1899)	Georges Feydeau	The Girl from Maxim's (1933)	Alexander Korda
La Dame de chez Maxim (1899)	Georges Feydeau	The Girl from Maxim's (1950)	Marcel Aboulker
La Dame de Saint-Tropez	Auguste Anicet-Bourgeois; Adolphe d'Ennery	Appassionatamente (1954)	Giacomo Gentilomo
Ladies and Gentlemen (1937)	Ernest Vajda	The Great Garrick (1937)	James Whale
Ladies and Gentlemen (1939)	Charles MacArthur; Ben Hecht	Perfect Strangers (1950)	Bretaigne Windust
Ladies' Day (1939)	Bob Considine; Edward C. Lilley; Bertrand Robinson	Ladies' Day (1943)	Leslie Goodwins
Ladies in Retirement (1940)	Reginald Denham; Edward Percy	Ladies in Retirement (1941)	Charles Vidor
Ladies in Retirement (1940)	Reginald Denham; Edward Percy	The Mad Room (1969)	Bernard Girard
Ladies' Night (1920)	Charlton Andrews; Avery Hopwood	Ladies' Night in a Turkish Bath (1928)	Edward F. Cline
Ladies of the Evening (1924)	Milton Herbert Gropper	Ladies of Leisure (1930)	Frank Capra
Ladies of the Jury (1929)	John Frederick Ballard	Ladies of the Jury (1932)	Lowell Sherman
Ladies of the Jury (1929)	John Frederick Ballard	We're on the Jury (1937)	Ben Holmes
Ladies Room	Robin Schiff	Romy and Michele's High School Reunion (1997)	David Mirkin
La Duchesse des Folies-Bergère (1902)	Georges Feydeau	The Queen of Moulin Rouge (1926)	Robert Wiene
Lady Behave (1941)	Stanley Lupino	Don't Give Up (1947)	Lars-Eric Kjellgren
Lady Frederick (1907)	W. Somerset Maugham	The Divorcee (1919)	Herbert Blaché
The Lady from Trévelez (1916)	Carlos Arniches	The Lady from Trévelez (1936)	Edgar Neville
The Lady from Trévelez (1916)	Carlos Arniches	Calle Mayor (1956)	Juan Antonio Bardem
The Lady in Ermine (1922)	Frederick Lonsdale; Cyrus Wood	Bride of the Regiment (1930, musical)	John Francis Dillon
A Lady Mislaid (1948)	Kenneth Horne	A Lady Mislaid (1958)	David MacDonald
The Lady of the Camellias	Alexandre Dumas, fils	Kameliadamen (1907)	Viggo Larsen
The Lady of the Camellias	Alexandre Dumas, fils	Camille (1909)	Ugo Falena
The Lady of the Camellias	Alexandre Dumas, fils	La Dame aux Camélias (1912)	André Calmettes; Louis Mercanton; Henri Pouctal
The Lady of the Camellias	Alexandre Dumas, fils	La Signora delle Camelie (1915)	Baldassarre Negroni
The Lady of the Camellias	Alexandre Dumas, fils	Camille (1915)	Albert Capellani
The Lady of the Camellias	Alexandre Dumas, fils	Camille (1917)	J. Gordon Edwards
The Lady of the Camellias	Alexandre Dumas, fils	Camille (1921)	Ray C. Smallwood
The Lady of the Camellias	Alexandre Dumas, fils	Damen med kameliorna (1925)	Olof Molander
The Lady of the Camellias	Alexandre Dumas, fils	Camille (1926)	Fred Niblo
The Lady of the Camellias	Alexandre Dumas, fils	La Dame aux Camélias (1934)	Fernand Rivers; Abel Gance
The Lady of the Camellias	Alexandre Dumas, fils	Camille (1936)	George Cukor
The Lady of the Camellias	Alexandre Dumas, fils	La Dame aux Camélias (1953)	Raymond Bernard
The Lady of the Camellias	Alexandre Dumas, fils	La Mujer de las camelias (1953)	Ernesto Arancibia
The Lady of the Camellias	Alexandre Dumas, fils	La Dame aux Camélias (1981)	Mauro Bolognini
The Lady of the Camellias	Alexandre Dumas, fils	Camille (1984)	Desmond Davis
Lady Windermere's Fan (1892)	Oscar Wilde	Lady Windermere's Fan (1916)	Fred Paul
Lady Windermere's Fan (1892)	Oscar Wilde	Lady Windermere's Fan (1925)	Ernst Lubitsch
Lady Windermere's Fan (1892)	Oscar Wilde	Story of a Bad Woman (1948)	Luis Saslavsky
Lady Windermere's Fan (1892)	Oscar Wilde	The Fan (1949)	Otto Preminger
Lady Windermere's Fan (1892)	Oscar Wilde	A Good Woman (2004)	Mike Barker
La Fausse Suivante (1724)	Pierre de Marivaux	False Servant (2000)	Benoît Jacquot
La Femme de ta jeunesse (1947)	Jacques Deval	Tuesday's Guest (1950)	Jacques Deval
La Femme et le Pantin (1911)	Pierre Frondaie; Pierre Louÿs	The Woman and the Puppet (1920)	Reginald Barker
La Femme et le Pantin (1911)	Pierre Frondaie; Pierre Louÿs	The Woman and the Puppet (1929)	Jacques de Baroncelli
La Femme Masquee (1923)	Charles Méré	The Masked Woman (1927)	Silvano Balboni
La Femme nue (1908)	Henry Bataille	The Naked Truth (1914)	Carmine Gallone
La Femme nue (1908)	Henry Bataille	The Nude Woman (1922)	Roberto Roberti
La Femme nue (1908)	Henry Bataille	The Nude Woman (1926)	Léonce Perret
La Femme nue (1908)	Henry Bataille	The Nude Woman (1932)	Jean-Paul Paulin
La fille et le garçon (1927)	André Birabeau; Georges Dolley	The Girl and the Boy (1931)	Wilhelm Thiele; Roger Le Bon
La fille et le garçon (1927)	André Birabeau; Georges Dolley	Two Hearts Beat as One (1932)	Wilhelm Thiele
La Flamme	Charles Méré	The Flame (1926)	René Hervil
La Flamme	Charles Méré	The Flame (1936)	André Berthomieu
La gibigianna	Carlo Bertolazzi	Vanity (1947)	Giorgio Pastina
La Gorgona (1913)	Sem Benelli	The Gorgon (1942)	Guido Brignone
La governante (1952)	Vitaliano Brancati	La governante (1974)	Giovanni Grimaldi
La Grande Duchesse et le garçon d'étage (1924)	Alfred Savoir	The Grand Duchess and the Waiter (1926)	Malcolm St. Clair
La Grande Duchesse et le garçon d'étage (1924)	Alfred Savoir	Here Is My Heart (1934)	Frank Tuttle
La Gringa (1928)	Tom Cushing	South Sea Rose (1929)	Allan Dwan
La huitième femme de Barbe-Bleue (1921)	Alfred Savoir	Bluebeard's 8th Wife (1923)	Sam Wood
La huitième femme de Barbe-Bleue (1921)	Alfred Savoir	Bluebeard's Eighth Wife (1938)	Ernst Lubitsch
L'Aigle à deux têtes (1946)	Jean Cocteau	The Mystery of Oberwald (1980)	Michelangelo Antonioni
L'Aiglon (1900)	Edmond Rostand	The Eaglet	Émile Chautard
Lakeboat (1980)	David Mamet	Lakeboat (2000)	Joe Mantegna
La Livrée de M. Le Comte	Francis de Croisset	Take My Tip (1937)	Herbert Mason
La Lola se va a los puertos	Antonio Machado; Manuel Machado	Lola Leaves for the Ports (1947)	Juan de Orduña
La Maison cernée	Pierre Frondaie	La Route impériale (1935)	Marcel L'Herbier
La Marche nupitale (1905)	Henry Bataille	The Wedding March (1915)	Carmine Gallone
La Marche nupitale (1905)	Henry Bataille	The Wedding March (1929)	André Hugon
La Marche nupitale (1905)	Henry Bataille	The Wedding March (1934)	Mario Bonnard
The Lame Dog Inn	Leslie Bush-Fekete	The Roadhouse Murder (1932)	J. Walter Ruben
La Merveilleuse Journée (1922)	Yves Mirande	The Wonderful Day (1929 film)	René Barberis
La Merveilleuse Journée (1922)	Yves Mirande	The Wonderful Day (1932 film)	Robert Wyler; Yves Mirande
La Merveilleuse Journée (1922)	Yves Mirande	The Wonderful Day (1980 film)	Claude Vital
La morte in vacanza (1924)	Alberto Casella	Death Takes a Holiday (1934)	Mitchell Leisen
L'Amour à l'américaine (1930)	André Mouëzy-Éon; Robert Spitzer	American Love (1931)	Claude Heymann
L'amour veille (1907)	Gaston Arman de Caillavet; Robert de Flers	Love Watches (1918)	Henry Houry
La muette de Portici (1828)	Germain Delavigne; Eugène Scribe	The Dumb Girl of Portici (1916)	Phillips Smalley; Lois Weber
L'Amuse-gueule (1986)	Gérard Lauzier	Door on the Left as You Leave the Elevator (1988)	Édouard Molinaro
The Land of Promise (1913)	W. Somerset Maugham	The Land of Promise (1917)	Joseph Kaufman
The Land of Promise (1913)	W. Somerset Maugham	The Canadian (1926)	William Beaudine
L'âne de Buridan	Gaston Arman de Caillavet; Robert de Flers	Buridan's Donkey (1932)	Alexandre Ryder
L'Angoisse	Pierre Mills; Celia de Vilyars	Latin Quarter (1945 film)	Vernon Sewell
L'Angoisse	Pierre Mills; Celia de Vilyars	Ghost Ship (1952)	Vernon Sewell
L'Angoisse	Pierre Mills; Celia de Vilyars	House of Mystery (1961)	Vernon Sewell
L'Annonce faite à Marie (1912)	Paul Claudel	The Annunciation of Marie (1991)	Alain Cuny
L'Antenato (1923)	Carlo Veneziani	The Ancestor (1936)	Guido Brignone
La nuit est à nous (1925)	Henry Kistemaeckers	The Night Belongs to Us (1929)	Carl Froelich; Henry Roussel
La nuit est à nous (1925)	Henry Kistemaeckers	The Night Is Ours (1930)	Roger Lion; Carl Froelich; Henry Roussel
La nuit est à nous (1925)	Henry Kistemaeckers	The Night Is Ours (1953)	Jean Stelli
La paix chez soi(1903)	Georges Courteline	Scènes de ménage (1954)	André Berthomieu
La petite chocolatière (1909)	Paul Gavault	The Chocolate Girl (1927)	René Hervil
La petite chocolatière (1909)	Paul Gavault	The Chocolate Girl (1932)	Marc Allégret
La petite chocolatière (1909)	Paul Gavault	The Chocolate Girl (1950)	André Berthomieu
La Peur des coups (1895)	Georges Courteline	Scènes de ménage (1954)	André Berthomieu
La Possession (1921)	Henry Bataille	La Possession (1929)	Léonce Perret
La Présidente (1912)	Maurice Hennequin; Pierre Veber	Mademoiselle Gobete (1952)	Pietro Germi
La Présidente (1912)	Maurice Hennequin; Pierre Veber	La presidentessa (1977)	Luciano Salce
La Prétentaine (1957)	Jacques Deval	Beloved Impostor (1961)	Ákos Ráthonyi
La Rabouilleuse	Émile Fabre	Honor of the Family (1931)	Lloyd Bacon
The Laramie Project (2000)	Moisés Kaufman	The Laramie Project (2002)	Moisés Kaufman
La Reina Mora (1903)	Quintero brothers	The Moorish Queen (1937)	Eusebio Fernández Ardavín
La reine de Biarritz (1927)	Romain Coolus	The Queen of Biarritz (1934)	Jean Toulout
Larger than Life (1936)	Joseph Schrank	He Couldn't Say No (1938)	Lewis Seiler
La Rivale (1907)	Henry Kistemaeckers; Eugene Delard	The Woman of Bronze (1923)	King Vidor
The Lark (1952)	Jean Anouilh	The Lark (1958)	Alan Seymour
La Robe Rouge (1900)	Eugène Brieux	The Red Robe (1933)	Jean de Marguenat
La Ronde (1897)	Arthur Schnitzler	The Merry-Go-Round (1920)	Richard Oswald
La Ronde (1897)	Arthur Schnitzler	La Ronde (1950)	Max Ophüls
La Ronde (1897)	Arthur Schnitzler	Circle of Love (1964)	Roger Vadim
La Ronde (1897)	Arthur Schnitzler	Sexual Life (2005)	Ken Kwapis
360 (2011)	Fernando Meirelles		
L'Arpete	Yves Mirande	It Happened in Paris (1935)	Robert Wyler; Carol Reed
Las Brutas	Juan Radrigan	The Quispe Girls (2013)	Sebastian Sepulveda
Las estrellas (1904)	Carlos Arniches	Yo quiero ser tonta (1950)	Eduardo Ugarte
The Lash	Cyril Campion	The Lash (1934)	Henry Edwards
The Last Chance	Arnold Ridley	The Warren Case (1934)	Walter Summers
The Last Coupon	Ernest E. Bryan	Spring Handicap (1937)	Herbert Brenon
The Last Mile (1930)	John Wexley	The Last Mile (1932)	Samuel Bischoff
The Last Mile (1930)	John Wexley	The Last Mile (1959)	Howard W. Koch
The Last of Mrs. Cheyney (1925)	Frederick Lonsdale	The Last of Mrs. Cheyney (1929)	Sidney Franklin
The Last of Mrs. Cheyney (1925)	Frederick Lonsdale	The Last of Mrs. Cheyney (1937)	Richard Boleslawski
The Last of Mrs. Cheyney (1925)	Frederick Lonsdale	The Law and the Lady (1951)	Edwin H. Knopf
Last of the Red Hot Lovers (1969)	Neil Simon	Last of the Red Hot Lovers (1972)	Gene Saks
The Last Warning (1922)	Thomas F. Fallon	The Last Warning (1928)	Paul Leni
The Last Warning (1922)	Thomas F. Fallon	The House of Fear (1939)	Joe May
La tavola dei poveri	Raffaele Viviani	The Table of the Poor (1932)	Alessandro Blasetti
The Late Christopher Bean (1932)	René Fauchois	Christopher Bean (1933)	Sam Wood
The Late George Apley (1944)	John P. Marquand; George S. Kaufman	The Late George Apley (1947)	Joseph L. Mankiewicz
La Tentation	Charles Méré	Temptation (1929)	René Barberis; René Leprince
La Tosca	Victorien Sardou	The Chalice of Sorrow (1916)	Rex Ingram
La Tosca	Victorien Sardou	Tosca (1941 film)	Carl Koch
La Tosca	Victorien Sardou	Tosca (1956 film)	Carmine Gallone
La Tosca	Victorien Sardou	La Tosca (1973 film)	Luigi Magni
Laugh, Clown, Laugh (1923)	David Belasco; Tom Cushing	Laugh, Clown, Laugh (1928)	Herbert Brenon
The Laughing Lady	Alfred Sutro	A Society Scandal (1924)	Allan Dwan
The Laughing Lady	Alfred Sutro	The Laughing Lady (1929)	Victor Schertzinger
Laughter on the 23rd Floor (1993)	Neil Simon	Laughter on the 23rd Floor (2001)	Richard Benjamin
La vedova (1902)	Renato Simoni	The Widow (1939 film)	Goffredo Alessandrini
La veille d'armes (1917)	Claude Farrère; Lucien Népoty	The Woman from Monte Carlo (1932)	Michael Curtiz
L'Aventurier (1910)	Alfred Capus	L'Aventurier (1934)	Marcel L'Herbier
La Vie de chantier	Dany Boon	La Maison du Bonheur (2006)	Dany Boon
La Vierge folle (1910)	Henry Bataille	A Foolish Maiden (1929)	Luitz-Morat
La vita che ti diedi (1923)	Luigi Pirandello	The Wait (2015)	Piero Messina
La Voie Lactee (1933)	Alfred Savoir	The King of Paris (1934)	Jack Raymond
La Voyante	Sacha Guitry	The Clairvoyant (1924)	Leon Abrams
Lawful Larceny (1922)	Samuel Shipman	Lawful Larceny (1923)	Allan Dwan
Lawful Larceny (1922)	Samuel Shipman	Lawful Larceny (1930)	Lowell Sherman
The Law of the Land (1914)	George Broadhurst	The Law of the Land (1917)	Maurice Tourneur
The Lay of the Land	Mel Shapiro	The Lay of the Land (1997)	Larry Arrick
Lazybones (1924)	Owen Davis	Lazybones (1925)	Frank Borzage
Leave It to Psmith (1930)	Ian Hay; P. G. Wodehouse,	Leave It to Me (1933)	Monty Banks
Leaving (2007)	Václav Havel	Leaving (2011)	Václav Havel
Le Berceau (1898)	Eugène Brieux	The Cradle (1922)	Paul Powell
Le Bois sacré (1910)	Gaston Arman de Caillavet; Robert de Flers	Sacred Woods (1939)	Léon Mathot
Le Bonheur (1933)	Henri Bernstein	Le Bonheur (1934)	Marcel L'Herbier
Le Chevalier au masque	Paul Armont; Jean Manouss	The Purple Mask (1955)	H. Bruce Humberstone
Le Cocu magnifique (1921)	Fernand Crommelynck	The Magnificent Cuckold (1964)	Antonio Pietrangeli
Le Contrat (1969)	Francis Veber	L'emmerdeur (1973)	Édouard Molinaro
Le Contrat (1969)	Francis Veber	Buddy Buddy (1981)	Billy Wilder
Le Dindon (1908)	Georges Feydeau	The Turkey (1931)	Claude Barma
Le Dindon (1908)	Georges Feydeau	The Straw Lover (1951)	Gilles Grangier
Le Dîner de Cons (1993)	Francis Veber	The Dinner Game (1998)	Francis Veber
Le Diplomate (1827)	Eugène Scribe; Germain Delavigne	The Ambassador (1936)	Baldassarre Negroni
Le journal d'une femme de Chambre (1931)	André de Lorde	The Diary of a Chambermaid (1946)	Jean Renoir
Le Flambée (1911)	Henry Kistemaeckers	The Flame (1952)	Alessandro Blasetti
Le fruit vert (1924)	Régis Gignoux; Jacques Théry	Unripe Fruit (1934)	Carlo Ludovico Bragaglia
Le fruit vert (1924)	Régis Gignoux; Jacques Théry	A Precocious Girl (1934)	Max Neufeld
Le fruit vert (1924)	Régis Gignoux; Jacques Théry	Between Us Girls (1942)	Henry Koster
Le Libertin (1997)	Éric-Emmanuel Schmitt	The Libertine (2000)	Gabriel Aghion
Le Mariage de mademoiselle Beulemans (1910)	Frantz Fonson; Fernand Wicheler	The Marriage of Mademoiselle Beulemans (1927)	Julien Duvivier
Le Médecin malgré lui (1666)	Molière	The Doctor in Spite of Himself (1931)	Carlo Campogalliani
Le Médecin malgré lui (1666)	Molière	The Doctor in Spite of Himself (1999)	Lau Kwok Fai
Le Million (1911)	Georges Berr; Marcel Guillemaud	Le Million (1931)	René Clair
Le Monsieur de cinq heures	Maurice Hennequin; Pierre Veber	A Kiss in a Taxi (1927)	Clarence Badger
L'Enfant du miracle (1903)	Paul Gavault; Robert Charvay	The Miracle Child (1932)	André Gillois
Lenny	Julian Barry	Lenny (1974)	Bob Fosse
Le Père de Mademoiselle (1953)	Roger Ferdinand	The Father of the Girl (1953)	Marcel L'Herbier
Le père Noël est une ordure (1979)	Le Splendid	Santa Claus Is a Stinker (1982)	Jean-Marie Poiré
L'Épervier (1925)	Francis de Croisset	L'Épervier (1933)	Marcel L'Herbier
Le Père (2012)	Florian Zeller	Floride (2015)	Philippe Le Guay
Le Phalène (1913)	Henry Bataille	La falena (1916)	Carmine Gallone
Le Reveillon (1872)	Henri Meilhac; Ludovic Halévy	So This Is Paris (1926)	Ernst Lubitsch
Le Roi (1908)	Gaston Arman de Caillavet; Robert de Flers; Emmanuel Arène	data-sort-value="''The King'' !" | [[The King]] (1936)	Pierre Colombier
Le Roi (1908)	Gaston Arman de Caillavet; Robert de Flers; Emmanuel Arène	The King on Main Street (1925)	Monta Bell
Le Roi des palaces (1911)	Henry Kistemaeckers	King of the Hotel (1932)	Carmine Gallone
Le Roi des palaces (1911)	Henry Kistemaeckers	King of the Ritz (1933)	Carmine Gallone; Herbert Smith
Le roi s'amuse (1832)	Victor Hugo	Rigoletto (1918)	Jacob Fleck; Luise Fleck
Le roi s'amuse (1832)	Victor Hugo	The King's Jester (1941)	Mario Bonnard
Le ruisseau (1907)	Pierre Wolff	The Virtuous Model (1919)	Albert Capellani
Les Avariés (1901)	Eugène Brieux	Damaged Goods (1914)	Tom Ricketts
Les Avariés (1901)	Eugène Brieux	Damaged Goods (1919)	Alexander Butler
Les Avariés (1901)	Eugène Brieux	Damaged Lives (1933)	Edgar G. Ulmer
Les Avariés (1901)	Eugène Brieux	Damaged Goods (1937)	Phil Goldstone
Le Scandale (1909)	Henry Bataille	The Scandal (1923)	Arthur Rooke
Le Scandale (1909)	Henry Bataille	The Scandal (1934)	Marcel L'Herbier
Les Beaux Jours d'Aranjuez	Peter Handke	The Beautiful Days of Aranjuez (2016)	Wim Wenders
Les Boulingrin(1898)	Georges Courteline	Scènes de ménage (1954)	André Berthomieu
Les Contes de la reine de Navarre (1850)	Eugène Scribe	The Queen of Navarre (1942)	Carmine Gallone
Les Côtelettes (1997)	Bertrand Blier	Les Côtelettes (2003)	Bertrand Blier
Les Deux Timides (1860)	Eugène Labiche	Two Timid Souls (1928)	René Clair
Les Deux Timides (1860)	Eugène Labiche	Two Timid Souls (1943)	Yves Allégret
Les Dragées d'Hercule	Maurice Hennequin; Paul Bilhaud	Le pillole di Ercole (1960)	Luciano Salce
Les Gaîtés de l'escadron (1904)	Georges Courteline	The Gaieties of the Squadron (1913)	Maurice Tourneur; Joseph Faivre
Les Gaîtés de l'escadron (1904)	Georges Courteline	Fun in the Barracks (1932)	Maurice Tourneur
Les Gaîtés de l'escadron (1904)	Georges Courteline	The Cheerful Squadron (1954)	Paolo Moffa
Les J3	Roger Ferdinand	Les J3 (1946)	Roger Richebé
Les Joies du foyer (1910)	Maurice Hennequin; Pierre Veber	El Calavera (1954)	Carlos F. Borcosque
Les Liaisons Dangereuses (1985)	Christopher Hampton	Dangerous Liaisons (1988)	Stephen Frears
Les Marionnettes (1910)	Pierre Wolff	The Marionettes (1918)	Émile Chautard
Les Maris de Leontine (1900)	Alfred Capus	Leontine's Husbands (1928)	Robert Wiene
Les Muses orphelines	Michel Marc Bouchard	The Orphan Muses (2000)	Robert Favreau
Les Nouveaux Messieurs	Robert de Flers; Francis de Croisset	The New Gentlemen (1929)	Jacques Feyder
Les Parents terribles (1938)	Jean Cocteau	Les Parents terribles (1948)	Jean Cocteau
Les Parents terribles (1938)	Jean Cocteau	Intimate Relations (1953)	Charles Frank
Les Parents terribles (1938)	Jean Cocteau	Les Parents terribles (1980)	Yves-André Hubert
Le Souper (1989)	Jean-Claude Brisville	The Supper (1992)	Édouard Molinaro
Les Vignes du Seigneur	Francis de Croisset; Robert de Flers	Our Lord's Vineyard (1932)	René Hervil
Le Tailleur au château	Paul Armont; Léopold Marchand	Love Me Tonight (1932, musical)	Rouben Mamoulian
Le Trou dans le mur	Yves Mirande	A Hole in the Wall (1930)	René Barberis
Le Trou dans le mur	Yves Mirande	A Lucky Man (1930)	Benito Perojo
Le Trou dans le mur	Yves Mirande	A Hole in the Wall (1950)	Émile Couzinet
Let's Face It! (1941)	Herbert Fields; Dorothy Fields	Let's Face It (1943)	Sidney Lanfield
The Letter (1927)	W. Somerset Maugham	The Letter (1929)	Jean de Limur
The Letter (1927)	W. Somerset Maugham	The Letter (1940)	William Wyler
The Letter (1927)	W. Somerset Maugham	The Unfaithful (1947)	Vincent Sherman
Letty	Arthur Wing Pinero	The Loves of Letty (1919)	Frank Lloyd
L'Étudiante et Monsieur Henri	Ivan Calbérac	The Student and Mister Henri (2015)	Ivan Calbérac
Let Us Be Gay (1929)	Rachel Crothers	Let Us Be Gay (1930)	Robert Z. Leonard
Le veau gras (1924)	Bernard Zimmer	The Fatted Calf (1939)	Serge de Poligny
L'Éveil du Chameau	Murielle Magellan	Love at First Child (2015)	Anne Giafferi
Le venin	Henri Bernstein	Orage (1938)	Marc Allégret
Le Vertige	Charles Méré	Le Vertige (1926)	Marcel L'Herbier
Le Voyageur sans bagage (1937)	Jean Anouilh	Traveling Light (1944)	Jean Anouilh
Le Zebre (1920)	Paul Armont	The Glad Eye (1920)	James Reardon; Kenelm Foss
Le Zebre (1920)	Paul Armont	The Glad Eye (1927)	Maurice Elvey
L'Habit vert (1912)	Gaston Arman de Caillavet; Robert de Flers	The Green Jacket (1937)	Roger Richebé
L'homme à la Rose (1920)	Henry Bataille	The Private Life of Don Juan (1934)	Alexander Korda
L'homme en habit (1920)	Yves Mirande; André Picard	She Wolves (1925)	Maurice Elvey
L'homme en habit (1920)	Yves Mirande; André Picard	Evening Clothes (1927)	Luther Reed
L'homme en habit (1920)	Yves Mirande; André Picard	A Gentleman in Tails (1931)	Roger Capellani
L'homme que j'ai tué (1925)	Maurice Rostand	Broken Lullaby (1932)	Ernst Lubitsch
L'homme qui assassina	Claude Farrère	The Man Who Murdered (1931)	Curtis Bernhardt
L'Homme qui assassina (1913)	Pierre Frondaie	The Right to Love (1920)	George Fitzmaurice
L'Homme riche	Jean Jose Frappa	Billions (1920)	Ray C. Smallwood
L'Hôtel du libre échange (1894)	Georges Feydeau; Maurice Desvallières	Äktenskapsbrottaren (1964)	Hasse Ekman
L'Hôtel du libre échange (1894)	Georges Feydeau; Maurice Desvallières	Hotel Paradiso (1966)	Peter Glenville
Libahunt (1912)	August Kitzberg	Libahunt (1968)	Leida Laius
Libby	Budd Grossman	Bachelor Flat (1961)	Frank Tashlin
Libel! (1934)	Edward Wooll	Libel (1959)	Anthony Asquith
The Libertine (1994)	Stephen Jeffreys	The Libertine (2005)	Laurence Dunmore
Liberty Hall (1892)	R. C. Carton	Liberty Hall (1914)	Harold M. Shaw
The Lie (1915)	Henry Arthur Jones	The Lie (1918)	J. Searle Dawley
Liebelei (1894)	Arthur Schnitzler	Flirtation (1927)	Jacob Fleck
Liebelei (1894)	Arthur Schnitzler	Liebelei (1933)	Max Ophüls
Liebelei (1894)	Arthur Schnitzler	A Love Story (1933)	Max Ophüls
Liebelei (1894)	Arthur Schnitzler	Christine (1958)	Pierre Gaspard-Huit
Life Begins (1932)	Mary McDougal Axelson	Life Begins (1932)	James Flood
Life During Wartime	Keith Reddin	The Alarmist (1997)	Evan Dunsky
Life Eternal (1943)	Viktor Rozov	The Cranes Are Flying (1957)	Mikhail Kalatozov
A Life in the Theatre (1977)	David Mamet	A Life in the Theatre (1979)	Kirk Browning; Gerald Gutierrez
A Life in the Theatre (1977)	David Mamet	A Life in the Theatre (1993)	Gregory Mosher
Life Is Pretty Much the Same	Arthur Jarvis Black	The Plaything (1929)	Castleton Knight
Life of Galileo (1943)	Bertolt Brecht	Galileo (1975)	Joseph Losey
Life of Riley (2010)	Alan Ayckbourn	Life of Riley (2014)	Alain Resnais
Life with Father (1939)	Howard Lindsay; Russel Crouse	Life With Father (1947)	Michael Curtiz
The Lifted Veil (1921)	Henry Arthur Jones	Beyond (1921)	William Desmond Taylor
Lightnin' (1918)	Winchell Smith; Frank Bacon	Lightnin' (1925)	John Ford
Lightnin' (1918)	Winchell Smith; Frank Bacon	Lightnin' (1930)	Henry King
The Light of Heart (1940)	Emlyn Williams	Life Begins at Eight-Thirty (1942)	Irving Pichel
Lights Out (1922)	Paul Dickey	Crashing Hollywood (1938)	Lew Landers
Lights Out at Eleven	W. Armitage Owen	Save a Little Sunshine (1938)	Norman Lee
The Lights o' London (1881)	[[ {{{last}}}]]	Lights of London (1914)	Bert Haldane
The Lights o' London (1881)	[[ {{{last}}}]]	Lights of London (1923)	George Robert Sims
The Likes of Her (1923)	Charles McEvoy	Sally in Our Alley (1931)	Maurice Elvey
Lilac Time (1917)	Jane Murfin; Jane Cowl	Lilac Time (1928)	George Fitzmaurice
Lilas blanc	Ladislas Fodor	La Cinquième empreinte (1934)	Karl Anton
Lilas blanc	Ladislas Fodor	The White Lilac (1935)	Albert Parker
Lili (1882)	Alfred Hennequin; Albert Millaud	Lili (1918)	Cornelius Hintner
Lilies (1987)	Michel Marc Bouchard	Lilies (1996)	John Greyson
Lilies of the Field (1921)	William James Hurlbut	Lilies of the Field (1924)	John Francis Dillon
Lilies of the Field (1921)	William James Hurlbut	Lilies of the Field (1930)	Alexander Korda
Liliom (1909)	Ferenc Molnár	A Trip to Paradise (1921)	Maxwell Karger
Liliom (1909)	Ferenc Molnár	Liliom (1930)	Frank Borzage
Liliom (1909)	Ferenc Molnár	Liliom (1934)	Fritz Lang
Liliom (1909)	Ferenc Molnár	Carousel (1956)	Henry King
Lilly Turner	Philip Dunning; George Abbott	Lilly Turner (1933)	William A. Wellman
The Limping Man (1930)	William Matthew Scott	Creeping Shadows (1930)	J. O. C. Orton
The Limping Man (1930)	William Matthew Scott	The Limping Man (1936)	Walter Summers
Linger Longer Letty (1919)	Anne Nichols	Give Me a Sailor (1938)	Elliott Nugent
L'innesto (1917)	Luigi Pirandello	The Choice (2015)	Michele Placido
L'Insoumise (1923)	Pierre Frondaie	Fazil (1928)	Howard Hawks
L'Instinct (1905)	Henry Kistemaeckers	Instinct (1930)	André Liabel; Léon Mathot
Liolà (1916)	Luigi Pirandello	Liolà (1963)	Alessandro Blasetti
The Lion and the Mouse (1905)	Charles Klein	The Lion and the Mouse (1914)	Barry O'Neil
The Lion and the Mouse (1905)	Charles Klein	The Lion and the Mouse (1919)	Tom Terriss
The Lion and the Mouse (1905)	Charles Klein	The Lion and the Mouse (1928)	Lloyd Bacon
The Lion in Winter (1966)	James Goldman	The Lion in Winter (1968)	Anthony Harvey
The Lion in Winter (1966)	James Goldman	The Lion in Winter (2003)	Andrei Konchalovsky
Lipschtick	Heather Juergensen; Jennifer Westfeldt	Kissing Jessica Stein (2001)	Charles Herman-Wurmfeld
Little Accident (1928)	Floyd Dell; Thomas Mitchell	The Little Accident (1930)	William James Craft
Little Accident (1928)	Floyd Dell; Thomas Mitchell	Little Accident (film) (1939)	Charles Lamont
Little Accident (1928)	Floyd Dell; Thomas Mitchell	Casanova Brown (1944)	Sam Wood
A Little Bit of Fluff (1915)	Walter W. Ellis	A Little Bit of Fluff (1919)	Kenelm Foss
A Little Bit of Fluff (1915)	Walter W. Ellis	A Little Bit of Fluff (1928)	Wheeler Dryden; Jess Robbins
A Little Bit of Fluff (1915)	Walter W. Ellis	Let Me Explain, Dear (1932)	Gene Gerrard
The Little Cafe (1911)	Tristan Bernard	The Little Cafe (1919)	Raymond Bernard
The Little Cafe (1911)	Tristan Bernard	Playboy of Paris (1930)	Ludwig Berger
The Little Cafe (1911)	Tristan Bernard	The Little Cafe (1931)	Ludwig Berger
The Little Clown	Avery Hopwood	The Little Clown (1921)	Thomas N. Heffron
The Little Foxes (1939)	Lillian Hellman	The Little Foxes (1941)	William Wyler
The Little Hut (1950)	Nancy Mitford	The Little Hut (1957)	Mark Robson
Little Johnny Jones (1904)	George M. Cohan	Little Johnny Jones (1923)	Johnny Hines; Arthur Rosson
Little Johnny Jones (1904)	George M. Cohan	Little Johnny Jones (1929)	Mervyn LeRoy
A Little Journey (1918)	Rachel Crothers	A Little Journey (1927)	Robert Z. Leonard
Little Malcolm and His Struggle Against the Eunuchs (1965)	David Halliwell	Little Malcolm (1974)	Stuart Cooper
The Little Minister	J. M. Barrie	The Little Minister (1934)	Richard Wallace
Little Miss Bluebeard	Avery Hopwood; Gábor Drégely	Miss Bluebeard (1925)	Frank Tuttle
Little Miss Bluebeard	Avery Hopwood; Gábor Drégely	Her Wedding Night (1930)	Frank Tuttle
Little Miss Bluebeard	Avery Hopwood; Gábor Drégely	Let's Get Married (1931)	Louis Mercanton
Little Murders (1967)	Jules Feiffer	Little Murders (1971)	Alan Arkin
Little Nellie Kelly (1922)	George M. Cohan	Little Nellie Kelly (1940)	Norman Taurog
Little Old New York (1920)	Rida Johnson Young	Little Old New York (1923)	Sidney Olcott
Little Old New York (1920)	Rida Johnson Young	Little Old New York (1940)	Henry King
The Littlest Rebel (1909)	Edward Peple	The Littlest Rebel (1935)	David Butler
Little Tommy Tucker	Desmond Carter; Caswell Garth	Out of the Blue (1931)	Gene Gerrard
The Live Wire (1950)	Garson Kanin	The Right Approach (1961)	David Butler
The Living Corpse (1900)	Leo Tolstoy	The Living Corpse (1929)	Fedor Ozep
L'Occident (1913)	Henry Kistemaeckers	Eye for Eye (1918 film)	Albert Capellani
Lock Up Your Daughters (1959)	Bernard Miles	Lock Up Your Daughters (1969)	Peter Coe
Loco (1947)	Dale Eunson; Katherine Albert	How to Marry a Millionaire (1953)	Jean Negulesco
London Suite (1994)	Neil Simon	London Suite (1996)	Jay Sandrich
London Wall (1931)	John Van Druten	After Office Hours (1932)	Thomas Bentley
Long Ago Ladies (1934)	David Carb	Chatterbox (1936)	George Nicholls Jr.
The Long and the Short and the Tall (1959)	Willis Hall	The Long and the Short and the Tall (1961)	Leslie Norman
Long Day's Journey into Night (1956)	Eugene O'Neill	Long Day's Journey into Night (1962)	Sidney Lumet
Long Day's Journey into Night (1956)	Eugene O'Neill	Long Day's Journey into Night (1996)	David Wellington
The Long Stay Cut Short, or The Unsatisfactory Supper (1946)	Tennessee Williams	Baby Doll (1956)	Elia Kazan
The Long Voyage Home	Eugene O'Neill	The Long Voyage Home (1940)	John Ford
Look Back in Anger (1956)	John Osborne	Look Back in Anger (1959)	Tony Richardson
Look Back in Anger (1956)	John Osborne	Look Back in Anger (1980)	Lindsay Anderson; David Jones
Looking for Normal (2001)	Jane Anderson	Normal (2003)	Jane Anderson
Loot (1964)	Joe Orton	Loot (1970)	Silvio Narizzano
Lord Babs (1925)	Keble Howard	Lord Babs (1932)	Walter Forde
Lord Chumley (1888)	Henry Churchill de Mille; David Belasco	Forty Winks (1925)	Paul Iribe; Frank Urson
Lorenzaccio (1834)	Alfred de Musset	Lorenzaccio (1951)	Raffaello Pacini
Los Cuervos están de luto (1960)	Hugo Argüelles	Los Cuervos están de luto (1965)	Francisco del Villar
A Loss of Roses (1959)	William Inge	The Stripper (1963)	Franklin J. Schaffner
Lost in the Stars (1949)	Maxwell Anderson	Lost in the Stars (1974)	Daniel Mann
Lost in Yonkers (1991)	Neil Simon	Lost in Yonkers (1993)	Martha Coolidge
The Lottery Man (1909)	Rida Johnson Young	The Lottery Man (1916)	Leopold Wharton; Theodore Wharton
The Lottery Man (1909)	Rida Johnson Young	The Lottery Man (1919)	James Cruze
Louisiana (1933)	J. Augustus Smith	Drums O' Voodoo (1934)	Arthur Hoerl
Love and Kisses	Anita Rowe Block	Love and Kisses (1965)	Ozzie Nelson
The Lovebirds	Basil Thomas	The Night We Got the Bird (1961)	Darcy Conyers
The Love Captive	Max Marcin	The Love Captive (1934)	Max Marcin
The Love Dreams	Elmer Blaney Harris; Anne Nichols	Her Gilded Cage (1922)	Sam Wood
Love 'Em and Leave 'Em (1926)	George Abbott; John V. A. Weaver	Love 'Em and Leave 'Em (1926)	Frank Tuttle
Love 'Em and Leave 'Em (1926)	George Abbott; John V. A. Weaver	The Saturday Night Kid (1929)	A. Edward Sutherland
Love from a Stranger (1936)	Frank Vosper	Love from a Stranger (1937)	Rowland V. Lee
Love from a Stranger (1936)	Frank Vosper	Love from a Stranger (1947)	Richard Whorf
Love Letters (1988)	A. R. Gurney	Love Letters (1999)	Stanley Donen
Love Lies (1929)	Stanley Lupino; Arthur Rigby	Love Lies (1932)	Lupino Lane
The Love Race	Stanley Lupino	The Love Race (1931)	Lupino Lane
The Lovers (1956)	Leslie Stevens	The War Lord (1965)	Franklin J. Schaffner
Lovers and Other Strangers	Joseph Bologna; Renée Taylor	Lovers and Other Strangers (1970)	Cy Howard
Lovers' Lane (1901)	Clyde Fitch	Lovers' Lane (1924)	Phil Rosen
Love's a Luxury	Edward Hole and Guy Paxton,	Love's a Luxury (1952)	Francis Searle
Love's Labour's Lost (1590s)	William Shakespeare	Love's Labor Lost (1920)	Vernon Stallings
Love's Labour's Lost (1590s)	William Shakespeare	Love's Labour's Lost (2000)	Kenneth Branagh
The Love Suicides at Amijima	Chikamatsu Monzaemon	Double Suicide (1969)	Masahiro Shinoda
Love! Valour! Compassion! (1994)	Terrence McNally	Love! Valour! Compassion! (1997)	Joe Mantello
The Lower Depths (1902)	Maxim Gorky	The Lower Depths (1936)	Jean Renoir
The Lower Depths (1902)	Maxim Gorky	Night Inn (1947)	Huang Zuolin
The Lower Depths (1902)	Maxim Gorky	The Lower Depths (1957)	Akira Kurosawa
Loyalties (1933)	John Galsworthy	Loyalties (1933)	Basil Dean
The Luck of the Navy (1919)	Clifford Mills	The Luck of the Navy (1927)	Fred Paul
The Luck of the Navy (1919)	Clifford Mills	Luck of the Navy (1938)	Norman Lee
The Luck of Roaring Camp	Mark Blow; Ida Molesworth	The Luck of Roaring Camp (1911)	W. J. Lincoln
Lullaby (1923)	Edward Knoblock	The Sin of Madelon Claudet (1931)	Edgar Selwyn
Lulu play cycle: Earth Spirit (1895) and Pandora's Box (1904)	Frank Wedekind	Lulu (1917)	Alexander Antalffy
Lulu play cycle: Earth Spirit (1895) and Pandora's Box (1904)	Frank Wedekind	Lulu (1962)	Rolf Thiele
Lulu play cycle: Earth Spirit (1895) and Pandora's Box (1904)	Frank Wedekind	Lulu by Night (1986)	Emilio Martínez-Lázaro
Lulu Belle (1926)	Edward Sheldon; Charles MacArthur	Lulu Belle (1948)	Leslie Fenton
L'uomo, la bestia e la virtù (1919)	Luigi Pirandello	Man, Beast and Virtue (1953)	Steno
The Lure (1913)	George Scarborough	The Lure (1914)	Alice Guy-Blaché
The Lure of London	Arthur Applin	The Lure of London (1914)	Bert Haldane
Luther (1961)	John Osborne	Luther (1974)	Guy Green
Luv (1964)	Murray Schisgal	Luv (1967)	Clive Donner
Lydia Gilmore (1912)	Henry Arthur Jones	Lydia Gilmore (1915)	Hugh Ford; Edwin S. Porter
The Lyons Mail (1877)	Charles Reade	The Lyons Mail (1916)	Fred Paul
The Lyons Mail (1877)	Charles Reade	The Lyons Mail (1931)	Arthur Maude
Lysistrata (411 BC)	Aristophanes	The Second Greatest Sex (1955)	George Marshall
Lysistrata (411 BC)	Aristophanes	The Girls (1968)	Mai Zetterling
Lysistrata (411 BC)	Aristophanes	Şalvar Davası (1983)	Kartal Tibet
Lysistrata (411 BC)	Aristophanes	The Source (2011)	Radu Mihăileanu
Lysistrata (411 BC)	Aristophanes	Chi-Raq (2015)	Spike Lee

=== M ===
Play	Playwright	Film	Film director
Macbeth (1623)	William Shakespeare	Macbeth (1908)	J. Stuart Blackton
Macbeth (1623)	William Shakespeare	Macbeth (1909)	André Calmettes
Macbeth (1623)	William Shakespeare	Macbeth (1909)	Mario Caserini
Macbeth (1623)	William Shakespeare	Macbeth (1911)	Will Barker
Macbeth (1623)	William Shakespeare	Macbeth (1913)	Arthur Bourchier
Macbeth (1623)	William Shakespeare	Macbeth (1915)	Séverin-Mars
Macbeth (1623)	William Shakespeare	Macbeth (1916)	John Emerson
Macbeth (1623)	William Shakespeare	Macbeth (1922)	H. B. Parkinson
Macbeth (1623)	William Shakespeare	Macbeth (1948)	Orson Welles
Macbeth (1623)	William Shakespeare	Macbeth (1954)	George Schaefer
Macbeth (1623)	William Shakespeare	Macbeth (1960)	George Schaefer
Macbeth (1623)	William Shakespeare	Macbeth (1960)	William Sterling
Macbeth (1623)	William Shakespeare	Macbeth (1961)	Paul Almond
Macbeth (1623)	William Shakespeare	Macbeth (1965)	Alan Burke
Macbeth (1623)	William Shakespeare	Macbeth (1971)	Roman Polanski
Macbeth (1623)	William Shakespeare	Macbeth (1979)	Philip Casson
Macbeth (1623)	William Shakespeare	Macbeth (1981)	Kirk Browning
Macbeth (1623)	William Shakespeare	Macbeth (1982)	Béla Tarr
Macbeth (1623)	William Shakespeare	Macbeth (1987)	Claude d'Anna
Macbeth (1623)	William Shakespeare	Macbeth (2006)	Geoffrey Wright
Macbeth (1623)	William Shakespeare	Macbeth (2010)	Rupert Goold
Macbeth (1623)	William Shakespeare	Macbeth (2015)	Justin Kurzel
Macbeth (1623)	William Shakespeare	The Tragedy of Macbeth (2021)	Joel Coen
Ma cousine de Varsovie	Louis Verneuil	My Cousin from Warsaw (1931)	Carmine Gallone
Madame Butterfly (1900)	David Belasco	Madame Butterfly (1915 film)	Sidney Olcott
Madame Butterfly (1900)	David Belasco	Harakiri (1919)	Fritz Lang
Madame Butterfly (1900)	David Belasco	Madame Butterfly (1932)	Marion Gering
Madame Butterfly (1900)	David Belasco	Madame Butterfly (1954)	Carmine Gallone
Madame Louise (1945)	Vernon Sylvaine	Madame Louise (1951)	Maclean Rogers
Madame Sans-Gêne (1893)	Victorien Sardou; Émile Moreau	Madame Sans-Gêne (1911)	André Calmettes; Henri Desfontaines
Madame Sans-Gêne (1893)	Victorien Sardou; Émile Moreau	Madame Sans-Gêne (1925)	Léonce Perret
Madame Sans-Gêne (1893)	Victorien Sardou; Émile Moreau	Madame (1961)	Christian-Jaque
Madea's Big Happy Family (2010)	Tyler Perry	Madea's Big Happy Family (2011)	Tyler Perry
A Madea Christmas (2011)	Tyler Perry	A Madea Christmas (2013)	Tyler Perry
Madea Goes to Jail (2005)	Tyler Perry	Madea Goes to Jail (2009)	Tyler Perry
Madea's Family Reunion (2002)	Tyler Perry	Madea's Family Reunion (2006)	Tyler Perry
Mademoiselle Josette, My Woman (1906)	Paul Gavault; Robert Charvay	Mademoiselle Josette, My Woman (1926)	Gaston Ravel
Mademoiselle Josette, My Woman (1906)	Paul Gavault; Robert Charvay	Mademoiselle Josette, My Woman (1933)	André Berthomieu
Mademoiselle Josette, My Woman (1906)	Paul Gavault; Robert Charvay	Mademoiselle Josette, My Woman (1950)	André Berthomieu
Mademoiselle ma mère	Louis Verneuil	Mademoiselle ma mère (1937)	Henri Decoin
The Madness of George III (1991)	Alan Bennett	The Madness of King George (1994)	Nicholas Hytner
data-sort-value="Madness of Love !" | The Madness of Love (1855)	Manuel Tamayo y Baus	Madness for Love (1948)	Juan de Orduña
data-sort-value="Madness of Love !" | The Madness of Love (1855)	Manuel Tamayo y Baus	Mad Love (2001)	Vicente Aranda
The Madwoman of Chaillot (1945)	Jean Giraudoux	The Madwoman of Chaillot (1969)	Bryan Forbes
Magda is Expelled (1933)	Miklós Kádár; László Kádár	Magda Expelled (1938)	Ladislao Vajda
Magda is Expelled (1933)	Miklós Kádár; László Kádár	Maddalena, Zero for Conduct	Vittorio De Sica
Maggie	Caesar Dun	The Mating Season (1951)	Mitchell Leisen
Maggie Pepper (1911)	Charles Klein	Maggie Pepper (1919)	Chester Withey
The Magistrate (1885)	Arthur Wing Pinero	The Magistrate (1921)	Bannister Merwin
Mágnás Miska	Károly Bakoni; Andor Gábor	Miska the Magnate (1916)	Alexander Korda
Mágnás Miska	Károly Bakoni; Andor Gábor	Mickey Magnate (1949)	Márton Keleti
The Magnificent Yankee (1940)	Emmet Lavery	The Magnificent Yankee (1950)	John Sturges
The Magnificent Yankee (1940)	Emmet Lavery	The Magnificent Yankee (1965)	George Schaefer
The Maid of the Mountains (1917)	Frederick Lonsdale	The Maid of the Mountains (1932)	Lupino Lane
The Maids	Jean Genet (1947)	The Maids (1975)	Christopher Miles
Maitre Bolbec et son mari (1927)	Georges Berr; Louis Verneuil	The World at Her Feet (1927)	Luther Reed
Maitre Bolbec et son mari (1927)	Georges Berr; Louis Verneuil	Feminine Wiles (1951)	Carlos Schlieper
Major Barbara (1905)	George Bernard Shaw	Major Barbara (1941)	Gabriel Pascal
A Majority of One (1959)	Leonard Spigelgass	A Majority of One (1961)	Mervyn LeRoy
Maku ga Agaru	Oriza Hirata	Maku ga Agaru (2015)	Katsuyuki Motohiro
data-sort-value="Male Animal !" | The Male Animal (1940)	Elliott Nugent; James Thurber	The Male Animal (1942)	Elliott Nugent
data-sort-value="Male Animal !" | The Male Animal (1940)	Elliott Nugent; James Thurber	She's Working Her Way Through College (1952)	H. Bruce Humberstone
Malvaloca (1912)	Quintero brothers	Malvaloca (1926)	Benito Perojo
Malvaloca (1912)	Quintero brothers	Malvaloca (1942)	Luis Marquina
Malvaloca (1912)	Quintero brothers	Malvaloca (1954)	Ramón Torrado
Maman Colibri (1904)	Henry Bataille	Second Youth (1938)	Michał Waszyński
Mama's Affair (1920)	Rachel Barton Butler	Mama's Affair (1921)	Victor Fleming
Mama, I Want to Sing! (1983)	Vy Higginsen; Ken Wydro	Mama, I Want to Sing! (2009)	Charles Randolph-Wright
The Man (1950)	Mel Dinelli	Beware, My Lovely (1952)	Harry Horner
Mandingo (1961)	Jack Kirkland	Mandingo (1975)	Richard Fleischer
The Mandrake (1518)	Niccolò Machiavelli	The Mandrake (1965)	Alberto Lattuada
The Man-Eating Tiger (1927)	Ben Hecht; Rose Caylor	Spring Tonic (1935)	Clyde Bruckman
A Man for All Seasons (1960)	Robert Bolt	A Man for All Seasons (1966)	Fred Zinnemann
The Man from Home (1906)	Booth Tarkington; Harry Leon Wilson	The Man from Home (1914)	Cecil B. DeMille
The Man from Home (1906)	Booth Tarkington; Harry Leon Wilson	The Man from Home (1922)	George Fitzmaurice
The Man from Mexico	Henry A. DuSouchet	The Man from Mexico (1914)	Thomas N. Heffron
The Man from Mexico	Henry A. DuSouchet	Let's Get Married (1926)	Gregory La Cava
Mangeuses d'Hommes	Daniel Colas	Mangeuses d'Hommes (1988)	Daniel Colas
The Man in Evening Clothes (1924)	André Picard; Yves Mirande	She Wolves (1925)	Maurice Elvey
The Man in Half Moon Street (1939)	Barré Lyndon	The Man in Half Moon Street (1945)	Ralph Murphy
The Man in Half Moon Street (1939)	Barré Lyndon	The Man Who Could Cheat Death (1959)	Terence Fisher
The Man in Possession	H. M. Harwood	The Man in Possession (1931)	Sam Wood
The Man in the Glass Booth (1968)	Robert Shaw	The Man in the Glass Booth (1975)	Arthur Hiller
The Man Outside (1947)	Wolfgang Borcher	Love '47 (1949)	Wolfgang Liebeneiner
Man's Castle	Frank Borzage	Man's Castle (1933)	Lawrence Hazard
A Man's World (1910)	Rachel Crothers	A Man's World (1918)	Herbert Blaché
The Man Who Came Back	John Fleming Wilson	The Man Who Came Back (1931)	Raoul Walsh
The Man Who Came to Dinner (1939)	George S. Kaufman	The Man Who Came to Dinner (1942)	William Keighley
The Man Who Came to Dinner (1939)	George S. Kaufman	The Man Who Came to Dinner (1972)	Buzz Kulik
The Man Who Changed His Name (1928)	Edgar Wallace	The Man Who Changed His Name (1928)	A. V. Bramble
The Man Who Was Peter Pan (1998)	Allan Knee	Finding Neverland (2004)	Marc Forster
Many Waters (1928)	Monckton Hoffe	Many Waters (1931)	Milton Rosmer
Ma Rainey's Black Bottom (1982)	August Wilson	Ma Rainey's Black Bottom (2020)	George C. Wolfe
Maratonci trče počasni krug (1973)	Dušan Kovačević	The Marathon Family (1982)	Slobodan Šijan
Marat/Sade (1963)	Peter Weiss	Marat/Sade (1967)	Peter Brook
Marauders (1905)	August Strindberg	Comrades (1919)	Johannes Guter
Marcelle (1895)	Victorien Sardou	Marcella (1937)	Guido Brignone
Margin for Error (1939)	Clare Boothe Luce	Margin for Error (1943)	Otto Preminger
Marie and Bruce (1978)	Wallace Shawn	Marie and Bruce (2004)	Tom Cairns
Marie Tudor (1833)	Victor Hugo	Marie Tudor (1912)	Albert Capellani
Marigold (1927)	Lizzie Allen Harker; Francis R. Pryor	Marigold (1938)	Thomas Bentley
Marika	István Zágon	Marika (1938)	Viktor Gertler
Marika	István Zágon	Marili (1959)	Josef von Báky
Marius (1929)	Marcel Pagnol	Marius (1931)	Alexander Korda
Marius (1929)	Marcel Pagnol	Marius (2013)	Daniel Auteuil
Marjorie Prime (2014)	Jordan Harrison	Marjorie Prime (2017)	Michael Almereyda
The Marriage Counselor (2008)	Tyler Perry	Temptation: Confessions of a Marriage Counselor (2013)	Tyler Perry
The Marriage-Go-Round (1958)	Leslie Stevens	The Marriage-Go-Round (1961)	Walter Lang
The Marriage of Figaro (1784)	Pierre Beaumarchais	The Marriage of Figaro (1920)	Max Mack
The Marriage of Figaro (1784)	Pierre Beaumarchais	Figaro (1929)	Tony Lekain; Gaston Ravel
The Marriage of Figaro (1784)	Pierre Beaumarchais	The Marriage of Figaro (1949)	Georg Wildhagen
The Marriage of Figaro (1784)	Pierre Beaumarchais	The Marriage of Figaro (1960)	Alan Burke
The Marriage of Figaro (1784)	Pierre Beaumarchais	The Crazy Day or The Marriage of Figaro (2003, TV)	Semen Gorov
The Marriage of Kitty (1902)	Cosmo Gordon-Lennox	The Marriage of Kitty (1915)	George Melford
The Marriage of Kitty (1902)	Cosmo Gordon-Lennox	Afraid to Love (1927)	Edward H. Griffith
Married Life	John Baldwin Buckstone	Married Life (1921)	Georges Tréville
Marry the Girl (1930)	George Arthurs; Arthur Miller	Marry the Girl (1935)	Maclean Rogers
Martinique (1920)	Laurence Eyre	Volcano! (1926)	William K. Howard
Marty (1953)	Paddy Chayefsky	Marty (1955)	Delbert Mann
Martyre!	Adolphe d'Ennery	Martyr (1927)	Charles Burguet
Märtyrer (2012)	Marius von Mayenburg	The Student (2016)	Kirill Serebrennikov
Marvin's Room (play)	Scott McPherson	Marvin's Room (1996)	Jerry Zaks
Mary Magdalene (1910)	Maurice Maeterlinck	Mary Magdalene (1914)	Arthur Maude
Mary, Mary	Jean Kerr	Mary, Mary (1963)	Mervyn LeRoy
Mary of Scotland (1933)	Maxwell Anderson	Mary of Scotland (1936)	John Ford
Mary the Third (1923)	Rachel Crothers	Wine of Youth (1924)	King Vidor
Masks and Faces (1852)	Charles Reade; Tom Taylor	Peg of Old Drury (1935)	Herbert Wilcox
Ma sœur et moi	Georges Berr; Louis Verneuil	My Sister and I (1929)	Manfred Noa
Ma sœur et moi	Georges Berr; Louis Verneuil	Mischievous Susana (1945)	Fernando Cortés
The Masquerader (1917)	John Hunter Booth	The Masquerader (1933)	Richard Wallace
The Masqueraders (1894)	Henry Arthur Jones	The Masquerader (1915)	James Kirkwood Sr.
The Masqueraders	Cyril Campion	The Four Masked Men (1934)	George Pearson
Mass Appeal	Bill C. Davis	Mass Appeal (1984)	Glenn Jordan
The Master Builder (1892)	Henrik Ibsen	A Master Builder (2013)	Jonathan Demme
"Master Harold"...and the Boys (1982)	Athol Fugard	Master Harold...and the Boys (1985)	Michael Lindsay-Hogg
"Master Harold"...and the Boys (1982)	Athol Fugard	Master Harold...and the Boys (2010)	Lonny Price
The Master Mind (1913)	Daniel David Cohen	The Master Mind (1920)	Kenneth Webb
The Matchmaker (1954)	Thornton Wilder	The Matchmaker (1958)	Joseph Anthony
The Matchmaker (1954)	Thornton Wilder	Hello, Dolly! (1969)	Gene Kelly
Mateo (1923)	Armando Discépolo	Mateo (1937)	Daniel Tinayre
Matilda Shouted Fire (1958)	Janet Green	Midnight Lace (1960)	David Miller
The Matrimonial Bed (1927)	Seymour Hicks	The Matrimonial Bed (1930)	Michael Curtiz
Matroni et moi (1995)	Alexis Martin	Matroni and Me (1999)	Jean-Philippe Duval
Matura (1934)	Ladislas Fodor	A Very Young Lady (1941)	Harold Schuster
Matura (1934)	Ladislas Fodor	Girls' Dormitory (1936)	Cummings
May Blossom	David Belasco	May Blossom (1915)	Allan Dwan
The Mayor of Zalamea (1636)	Pedro Calderón de la Barca	The Mayor of Zalamea (1920)	Ludwig Berger
The Mayor of Zalamea (1636)	Pedro Calderón de la Barca	The Mayor of Zalamea (1954)	José Gutiérrez Maesso
Maytime (1917)	Rida Johnson Young; Cyrus Wood	Maytime (1923)	Louis J. Gasnier
Maytime (1917)	Rida Johnson Young; Cyrus Wood	Maytime (1937)	Robert Z. Leonard
May We Come In	Harry Segal	For Heaven's Sake (1950)	George Seaton
Mąż Fołtasiówny	Jerzy Jurandot	Husband of His Wife (1961)	Stanisław Bareja
M. Butterfly (1988)	David Henry Hwang	M. Butterfly (1993)	David Cronenberg
The Meanest Man in the World	George M. Cohan	The Meanest Man in the World (1943)	Sidney Lanfield
Mećava (1952)	Pero Budak	Snowstorm (1977)	Antun Vrdoljak
Medea (431 BC)	Euripides	Medea (1969)	Pier Paolo Pasolini
Medea (431 BC)	Euripides	A Dream of Passion (1978)	Jules Dassin
Medea (431 BC)	Euripides	Medea (1988)	Lars von Trier
Medea (431 BC)	Euripides	Médée (2001)	Don Kent
A media luz los tres (1953)	Miguel Mihura	A media luz los tres (1958)	Julián Soler
The Medicine Man	Elliott Lester	The Medicine Man (1930)	Scott Pembroke
Meet a Body (1954)	Frank Launder	The Green Man (1956)	Robert Day
Meet the Browns (2004)	Tyler Perry	Meet the Browns (2008)	Tyler Perry
Mélo (1929)	Henri Bernstein	Dreaming Lips (1932)	Paul Czinner
Mélo (1929)	Henri Bernstein	Dreaming Lips (1937)	Paul Czinner
Mélo (1929)	Henri Bernstein	Dreaming Lips (1953)	Josef von Báky
Mélo (1929)	Henri Bernstein	Mélo (1986)	Alain Resnais
The Melody Man (1924)	Herbert Fields	The Melody Man (1930)	Roy William Neill
The Melting Pot (1909)	Israel Zangwill	The Melting Pot (1915)	James Vincent; Oliver D. Bailey
The Member of the Wedding (1950)	Carson McCullers	The Member of the Wedding (1952)	Fred Zinnemann
A Memory of Two Mondays (1955)	Arthur Miller	A Memory of Two Mondays (1971)	Paul Bogart
Menschen im Hotel (1930, adapted from the novel Grand Hotel)	Vicki Baum	Grand Hotel (1932)	William A. Drake
Menschen im Hotel (1930, adapted from the novel Grand Hotel)	Vicki Baum	Week-End at the Waldorf (1945)	Robert Z. Leonard
Men and Women (1890)	David Belasco; Henry Churchill de Mille	Men and Women (1925)	William C. deMille
Men in White (1933)	Sidney Kingsley	Men in White (1934)	Richard Boleslawski
Men Must Fight (1932)	Reginald Lawrence; S. K. Lauren	Men Must Fight (1933)	Edgar Selwyn
Men Without a Past	Jean Martet	S.O.S. Sahara (1938)	Jacques de Baroncelli
Men Without a Past	Jean Martet	Station Six-Sahara (1962)	Seth Holt
Mercadet Le Faiseur (1848)	Honoré de Balzac	The Lovable Cheat (1949)	Richard Oswald
The Merchant of Venice	William Shakespeare	The Venetian Looking-Glass (1905)	Georges Méliès
The Merchant of Venice	William Shakespeare	The Merchant of Venice (1914)	Phillips Smalley
The Merchant of Venice	William Shakespeare	The Merchant of Venice (1916)	Walter West
The Merchant of Venice	William Shakespeare	The Merchant of Venice (1923)	Peter Paul Felner
The Merchant of Venice	William Shakespeare	Shylock (1940)	Kinema Ramu; Serukalathur Sama (as Sama-Ramu)
The Merchant of Venice	William Shakespeare	The Merchant of Venice (1953)	Pierre Billon
The Merchant of Venice	William Shakespeare	The Merchant of Venice (1969)	Orson Welles
The Merchant of Venice	William Shakespeare	The Maori Merchant of Venice (2002)	Don Selwyn
The Merchant of Venice	William Shakespeare	The Merchant of Venice (2004)	Michael Radford
Merely Mary Ann (1903)	Israel Zangwill	Merely Mary Ann (1931)	Henry King
Merry Andrew (1929)	Lewis Beach	Handy Andy (1934)	David Butler
Merry Andrew (1929)	Lewis Beach	Young as You Feel (1940)	Malcolm St. Clair
Merry-Go-Round (1932)	Albert Maltz; George Sklar	Afraid to Talk (1932)	Edward L. Cahn
The Merry Wives of Windsor	William Shakespeare	The Merry Wives of Windsor (1918)	William Wauer
The Merry Wives of Windsor	William Shakespeare	The Merry Wives of Windsor (1950)	Georg Wildhagen
The Merry Wives of Windsor	William Shakespeare	The Merry Wives of Windsor (1965)	Georg Tressler
Merton of the Movies (1922)	George S. Kaufman; Marc Connelly	Merton of the Movies (1924)	James Cruze
Merton of the Movies (1922)	George S. Kaufman; Marc Connelly	Make Me a Star (1932)	William Beaudine
Merton of the Movies (1922)	George S. Kaufman; Marc Connelly	Merton of the Movies (1947)	Robert Alton
A Message from Mars (1899)	Richard Ganthony	A Message from Mars (1913)	J. Wallett Waller
Messrs. Glembay (1929)	Miroslav Krleža	The Glembays (1988)	Antun Vrdoljak
The Meter Man (1964)	C. Scott Forbes	The Penthouse (1967)	Peter Collinson
Mexican Hayride (1944)	Herbert Fields; Dorothy Fields	Mexican Hayride (1948)	Charles Barton
Mezhugu Bommaigal	R. Venkat	Pilot Premnath (1978)	A. C. Tirulokchandar
Mice and Men (1901)	Madeleine Lucette Ryley	Mice and Men (1916)	J. Searle Dawley
Middle-Age Spread (1977)	Roger Hall	Middle Age Spread (1979)	John Reid
Middle of the Night (1954)	Paddy Chayefsky	Middle of the Night (1959)	Delbert Mann
The Middle Watch (1929; revised 1940)	Stephen King-Hall; Ian Hay	The Middle Watch (1930)	Norman Walker
The Middle Watch (1929; revised 1940)	Stephen King-Hall; Ian Hay	The Middle Watch (1940)	Thomas Bentley
The Middle Watch (1929; revised 1940)	Stephen King-Hall; Ian Hay	Girls at Sea (1958)	Gilbert Gunn
A Midnight Bell (1889)	Charles H. Hoyt	A Midnight Bell (1921)	Charles Ray
The Midshipmaid (1931)	Ian Hay; Stephen King-Hall	The Midshipmaid (1932)	Albert de Courville
The Mighty Barnum	Gene Fowler; Bess Meredyth	The Mighty Barnum (1934)	Walter Lang
Milestones (1912)	Arnold Bennett; Edward Knoblock	Milestones (1916)	Thomas Bentley
The Milk Train Doesn't Stop Here Anymore (1963)	Tennessee Williams	Boom! (1968)	Joseph Losey
The Milky Way (1934)	Lynn Root; Harry Clork	The Milky Way (1936)	Leo McCarey
The Milky Way	Reginald Simpson; James Wedgwood Drawbell	The Innocents of Chicago (1932)	Lupino Lane
The Millionairess (1936)	George Bernard Shaw	The Millionairess (1960)	Anthony Asquith
Minha Mãe é uma Peça (2006)	Paulo Gustavo	Minha Mãe é uma Peça (2013)	André Pellenz
Minick (1924)	Edna Ferber; George S. Kaufman	Welcome Home (1925	James Cruze
Minick (1924)	Edna Ferber; George S. Kaufman	The Expert (1932)	Archie Mayo
Minick (1924)	Edna Ferber; George S. Kaufman	No Place to Go (1939)	Terry O. Morse
Minna von Barnhelm (1767)	Gotthold Ephraim Lessing	The Girl from Barnhelm (1940)	Hans Schweikart
Miquette et sa mère (1906)	Gaston Arman de Caillavet; Robert de Flers	Miquette (1934)	Henri Diamant-Berger; André Gillois; Henri Rollan
Miquette et sa mère (1906)	Gaston Arman de Caillavet; Robert de Flers	Papacito lindo (1939)	Fernando de Fuentes
Miquette et sa mère (1906)	Gaston Arman de Caillavet; Robert de Flers	Miquette (1940)	Jean Boyer
Miquette et sa mère (1906)	Gaston Arman de Caillavet; Robert de Flers	Miquette (1950)	Henri-Georges Clouzot
The Miracle (1911)	Karl Vollmöller	The Miracle (1912)	Max Reinhardt; Michel-Antoine Carré
The Miracle (1911)	Karl Vollmöller	Das Mirakel (1912)	Mime Misu
The Miracle (1911)	Karl Vollmöller	The Miracle (1959)	Irving Rapper
The Miracle Man (1914)	George M. Cohan	The Miracle Man (1919)	George Loane Tucker
The Miracle Man (1914)	George M. Cohan	The Miracle Man (1932)	Norman Z. McLeod
The Miracle Worker (1959)	William Gibson	The Miracle Worker (1962)	Arthur Penn
The Miracle Worker (1959)	William Gibson	The Miracle Worker (1979)	Paul Aaron
The Miracle Worker (1959)	William Gibson	The Miracle Worker (2000)	Nadia Tass
The Mirage (1920)	Edgar Selwyn	Possessed (1931)	Clarence Brown
Miranda	Peter Blackmore	Miranda (1948)	Ken Annakin
The Misanthrope (1666)	Molière	The Misanthrope (1974)	Carl Schultz
Mischief (1928)	Ben Travers	Mischief (1931)	Jack Raymond
The Miser (1668)	Molière	L'Avare (1980)	Louis de Funès; Jean Girault
The Miser (1668)	Molière	The Miser (1990)	Tonino Cervi
Miseria e Nobiltà (1888)	Eduardo Scarpetta	Poverty and Nobility (1954)	Mario Mattoli
The Misleading Lady	Charles Goddard; Paul Dickey	The Misleading Lady (1916)	Arthur Berthelet
The Misleading Lady	Charles Goddard; Paul Dickey	The Misleading Lady (1920)	George Irving; George Terwilliger
The Misleading Lady	Charles Goddard; Paul Dickey	The Misleading Lady (1932)	Stuart Walker
Miss Benton, R.N. (1930)	Florence Johns; Wilton Lackaye Jr.	Registered Nurse (1934)	Robert Florey
The Miss Firecracker Contest (1979)	Beth Henley	Miss Firecracker (1989)	Thomas Schlamme
Miss Julie (1888)	August Strindberg	Miss Julie (1922 film)	Felix Basch
Miss Julie (1888)	August Strindberg	The Sin of Julia (1946)	Mario Soffici
Miss Julie (1888)	August Strindberg	Miss Julie (1951)	Alf Sjöberg
Miss Julie (1888)	August Strindberg	Miss Julie (1999)	Mike Figgis
Miss Julie (1888)	August Strindberg	Miss Julie (film) (2014)	Liv Ullmann
Miss Lulu Bett (1920)	Zona Gale	Miss Lulu Bett (1921)	William C. deMille
Miss Lonelyhearts (1957)	Howard Teichmann	Lonelyhearts (1958)	Vincent J. Donehue
Mister Roberts (1948)	Thomas Heggen	Mister Roberts (1955)	John Ford; Mervyn LeRoy
Mister Roberts (1948)	Thomas Heggen	Mister Roberts (1984)	Melvin Bernhardt
Mistigri	Marcel Achard	Mistigri (1931)	Harry Lachman
Mistress Nell (1900)	George Cochrane Hazelton	Mistress Nell (1915)	James Kirkwood Sr.
The Mistress of the Inn (1753)	Carlo Goldoni	The Innkeeper (1944)	Luigi Chiarini
The Mistress of the Inn (1753)	Carlo Goldoni	La locandiera (film) (1980)	Paolo Cavara
The Mistress of the Inn (1753)	Carlo Goldoni	Miranda (1985 film)	Tinto Brass
Mlle. Modiste	Henry Blossom	Mademoiselle Modiste (1926)	Robert Z. Leonard
Mlle. Modiste	Henry Blossom	Kiss Me Again (1931)	William A. Seiter
A Modern Magdalen (1902)	C. Haddon Chambers	A Modern Magdalen (1915)	Will S. Davis
Mojo Mickybo	Owen McCafferty	Mickybo and Me (2004)	Terry Loane
The Moment of Death	Israel Zangwill	The Moment Before (1916)	Robert G. Vignola
Mon Crime (1934)	Georges Berr; Louis Verneuil	True Confession (1937)	Wesley Ruggles
Mon Crime (1934)	Georges Berr; Louis Verneuil	Cross My Heart (1946)	John Berry
Money (1840)	Edward Bulwer-Lytton	Money (1921)	Duncan McRae
Money By Wire	Edward A. Paulton	Get Off My Foot (1935)	William Beaudine
Mon Homme	Francis Carco; André Picard	Shadows of Paris (1924)	Herbert Brenon
The Monk and the Woman (1912)	Frederick Melville	The Monk and the Woman (1917)	Franklyn Barrett
The Monk from Santarem	Almeida Garrett	The Monk from Santarem (1924)	Lothar Mendes
Monna Vanna	Maurice Maeterlinck	Monna Vanna (1915)	Mario Caserini
Monna Vanna	Maurice Maeterlinck	Monna Vanna (1922)	Richard Eichberg
Monsieur Brotonneau (1914)	Gaston Arman de Caillavet	Monsieur Brotonneau (1939)	Alexander Esway
Monsieur de Pourceaugnac (1669)	Molière	Monsieur de Pourceaugnac (1985)	Michel Mitrani
The Monster (1922)	Crane Wilbur	The Monster (1925)	Roland West
Monster in a Box	Spalding Gray	Monster in a Box (1992)	Nick Broomfield
The Moon Is Blue (1951)	F. Hugh Herbert	The Moon Is Blue (1953)	Otto Preminger
In Moonlight Black Boys Look Blue	Tarell Alvin McCraney	Moonlight (2016)	Barry Jenkins
Moonlight and Honeysuckle (1919)	George Scarborough	Moonlight and Honeysuckle (1921)	Joseph Henabery
Moonlight and Valentino	Ellen Simon	Moonlight and Valentino (1995)	David Anspaugh
The Moon of the Caribbees	Eugene O'Neill	The Long Voyage Home (1940)	John Ford
Monsieur Lamberthier (1927)	Louis Verneuil	Jealousy (1929)	Jean de Limur
Monsieur Lamberthier (1927)	Louis Verneuil	Deception (1946)	Irving Rapper
A Month in the Country (1872)	Ivan Turgenev	Secrets (1943)	Pierre Blanchar
A Month in the Country (1872)	Ivan Turgenev	Two Women (2014)	Vera Glagoleva
A Month of Sundays (1985)	Bob Larbey	Age-Old Friends (1989, TV)	Allan Kroeker
The Moods of Marianne (1833)	Alfred de Musset	Two Friends (2015)	Louis Garrel
The Moon-Flower (1924)	Zoe Akins	Eve's Secret (1925)	Clarence Badger
The Moon Is Blue (1951)	F. Hugh Herbert	The Moon Is Blue (1953)	Otto Preminger
The Moon Is Blue (1951)	F. Hugh Herbert	Die Jungfrau auf dem Dach (1953)	Otto Preminger
Morgen ist Feiertag	Leo Perutz	Historia de una noche (1941)	Luis Saslavsky
Morning Departure	Kenneth Woollard	Morning Departure (1950)	Roy Ward Baker
Morning Glory (1939)	Zoë Akins	Morning Glory (1933 film)	Lowell Sherman
Morning Glory (1939)	Zoë Akins	Stage Struck (1958)	Sidney Lumet
Morning's at Seven (1939)	Paul Osborn	Morning's at Seven (1982)	Vivian Matalon
Mostly Fools	G. R. Malloch	The Devil's Maze (1929)	Gareth Gundrey
The Moth and the Flame (1898)	Clyde Fitch	The Moth and the Flame (1915)	Sidney Olcott
Mother (1910)	Jules Eckert Goodman	Mother (1914)	Maurice Tourneur
Mother Carey's Chickens (1917)	Kate Douglas Wiggin; Rachel Crothers	Mother Carey's Chickens (1938)	Rowland V. Lee
Mother Courage and Her Children (1939)	Bertolt Brecht	Mutter Courage und ihre Kinder (1961)	Peter Palitzsch; Manfred Wekwerth
The Mountebank	Ernest Denny	The Side Show of Life (1924)	Herbert Brenon
Mourning Becomes Electra (1931)	Eugene O'Neill	Mourning Becomes Electra (1947)	Dudley Nichols
Mouthpiece (2015)	Norah Sadava; Amy Nostbakken	Mouthpiece (2018)	Patricia Rozema
The Mouthpiece (1930)	Edgar Wallace	The Mouthpiece (1932)	James Flood; Elliott Nugent
Mr. Bones (never produced)	Irving Berlin	Mammy (1930)	Michael Curtiz
Mr Faint-Heart (1931)	Ian Hay	All at Sea (1935)	Anthony Kimmins
Mr. Fox of Venice	Frederick Knott	The Honey Pot (1967)	Joseph L. Mankiewicz
Mr. Imperium	Edwin H. Knopf	Mr. Imperium (1951)	Don Hartman
Mr. Pim Passes By (1919)	A. A. Milne	Mr. Pim Passes By (1921)	Albert Ward
Mr. Prohack (1927)	Edward Knoblock	Dear Mr. Prohack (1949)	Thornton Freeland
Mr Puntila and His Man Matti (1948)	Bertolt Brecht	Herr Puntila and His Servant Matti (1960)	Alberto Cavalcanti
Mr. Sycamore (1942)	Ketti Frings	Mr. Sycamore (1975)	Pancho Kohner
Mr. What's-His-Name? (1927)	Seymour Hicks	Mr. What's-His-Name? (1935)	Ralph Ince
Mr. Wu (1913)	Maurice Vernon; Harold Owen	Mr. Wu (1919)	Maurice Elvey
Mrs. Black Is Back (1904)	George V. Hobart	Mrs. Black Is Back (1914)	Thomas N. Heffron
Mrs Dane's Defence (1900)	Henry Arthur Jones	Mrs. Dane's Defense (1918)	Hugh Ford
Mrs Dane's Defence (1900)	Henry Arthur Jones	Mrs. Dane's Defense (1933)	A. V. Bramble
Mrs. Gibbons' Boys (1949)	Joseph Stein; Will Glickman	Mrs. Gibbons' Boys (1962)	Max Varnel
Mrs. Warren's Profession (1894)	George Bernard Shaw	Mrs. Warren's Profession (1960)	Ákos Ráthonyi
Mrs. Wiggs of the Cabbage Patch (1904)	Anne Crawford Flexner	Mrs. Wiggs of the Cabbage Patch (1914)	Harold Entwistle
Mrs. Wiggs of the Cabbage Patch (1904)	Anne Crawford Flexner	Mrs. Wiggs of the Cabbage Patch (1919)	Hugh Ford
Mrs. Wiggs of the Cabbage Patch (1904)	Anne Crawford Flexner	Mrs. Wiggs of the Cabbage Patch (1934)	Norman Taurog
Mrs. Wiggs of the Cabbage Patch (1904)	Anne Crawford Flexner	Mrs. Wiggs of the Cabbage Patch (1942)	Ralph Murphy
Mr. What's His Name (1927)	Seymour Hicks	Kisses for Breakfast (1941)	Lewis Seiler
Much Ado About Nothing (1600)	William Shakespeare	Viel Lärm um nichts (1964)	Martin Hellberg
Much Ado About Nothing (1600)	William Shakespeare	Much Ado About Nothing (1973)	Samson Samsonov
Much Ado About Nothing (1600)	William Shakespeare	Much Ado About Nothing (1993)	Kenneth Branagh
Much Ado About Nothing (1600)	William Shakespeare	Dil Chahta Hai (2001)	Farhan Akhtar
Much Ado About Nothing (1600)	William Shakespeare	Much Ado About Nothing (2012)	Joss Whedon
Much Ado About Nothing (1600)	William Shakespeare	Anyone but You (2023)	Will Gluck
The Mud Turtle (1925)	Elliott Lester	City Girl (1930)	F. W. Murnau
Muhammad bin Tughluq (1968)	Cho Ramaswamy	Muhammad bin Tughluq (1971)	Cho Ramaswamy
Mumsie (1920)	Edward Knoblock	Mumsie (1927)	Herbert Wilcox
Murder Gang	Basil Dean; George Munro	Sensation (1936)	Brian Desmond Hurst
Murder in the Cathedral (1935)	T. S. Eliot	Murder in the Cathedral (1951)	George Hoellering
Murder Mistaken (1952)	Janet Green	Cast a Dark Shadow (1955)	Lewis Gilbert
Murder on the Second Floor (1929)	Frank Vosper	Murder on the Second Floor (1932)	William C. McGann
Murder on the Second Floor (1929)	Frank Vosper	Shadows on the Stairs (1941)	D. Ross Lederman
Music in the Air (1932)	Oscar Hammerstein II	Music in the Air (1934)	Joe May
The Music Master (1904)	Charles Klein	The Music Master (1927)	Allan Dwan
My Boy Jack (1997)	David Haig	My Boy Jack (2007)	Brian Kirk
My Lady Friends (1919)	Frank Mandel; Emil Nyitray	My Lady Friends (1921)	Lloyd Ingraham
My Lady's Dress (1916)	Edward Knoblock	Blind Wives (1920)	Charles Brabin
My Night with Reg	Kevin Elyot	My Night with Reg (1996)	Roger Michell
My Old Dutch (1919)	Albert Chevalier; Arthur Shirley	My Old Dutch (1926)	Laurence Trimble
My Old Dutch (1919)	Albert Chevalier; Arthur Shirley	My Old Dutch (1934)	Sinclair Hill
My Old Lady (1996)	Israel Horovitz	My Old Lady (2014)	Israel Horovitz
My Philadelphia Father	Cordelia Drexel Biddle	The Happiest Millionaire (1967)	Norman Tokar
My Sister Eileen	Joseph A. Fields; Jerome Chodorov	My Sister Eileen (1942)	Alexander Hall
My Sister Eileen	Joseph A. Fields; Jerome Chodorov	My Sister Eileen (1955)	Richard Quine
Mystery Submarine	Jon Manchip White	Mystery Submarine (1963)	C. M. Pennington-Richards
Madame X (1908)	Alexandre Bisson	Madame X (1929)	Lionel Barrymore
Madame X (1908)	Alexandre Bisson	The Trial of Madame X (1955)	Paul England
Madame X (1908)	Alexandre Bisson	Madame X (1955)	Julián Soler
Madame X (1908)	Alexandre Bisson	Madame X (1966)	David Lowell Rich
Madame X (1908)	Alexandre Bisson	Madame X (1981)	Robert Ellis Miller

=== N ===
Play	Playwright	Film	Film director
Nagy Szerelem (1935)	Ferenc Molnár	Double Wedding (1937)	Richard Thorpe
Naked Boys Singing! (1998)	Robert Schrock	Naked Boys Singing! (2007)	Troy Christian; Robert Schrock
The Naked Genius (1943)	Gypsy Rose Lee	Doll Face (1945)	Lewis Seiler
The Naked King (1934)	Evgeny Schwartz	Cain XVIII (1963)	Nadezhda Kosheverova
Nancy's Private Affair (1930)	Myron Coureval Fagan	Smart Woman (1931)	Gregory La Cava
Napoli milionaria!	Eduardo De Filippo	Side Street Story (1950)	Eduardo De Filippo
Nathan Hale (1898)	Clyde Fitch	The Heart of a Hero (1916)	Émile Chautard
Nathan the Wise (1779)	Gotthold Ephraim Lessing	Nathan the Wise (1922)	Manfred Noa
The National Health (1969)	Peter Nichols	The National Health (1973)	Jack Gold
Naughty Cinderella	Henri Falk; René Peter	Good and Naughty (1926)	Malcolm St. Clair
Naughty Cinderella (1925)	Avery Hopwood	This Is the Night (1932)	Frank Tuttle
Naughty Marietta (1910)	Rida Johnson Young	Naughty Marietta (1935)	Robert Z. Leonard; W. S. Van Dyke
The Nelson Touch	Neil Grant	His Lordship (1936)	Herbert Mason
Nənawā́te (1986)	William Mastrosimone	The Beast (1988)	Kevin Reynolds
The Net (1919)	Maravene Thompson	The Net (1923)	J. Gordon Edwards
Never Come Back	Frederick Lonsdale	Leave It to Smith (1933)	Tom Walls
Never Say Die (1912)	William H. Post; William Collier Sr.	Never Say Die (1939)	Elliott Nugent
Never Too Late (1962)	Sumner Arthur Long	Never Too Late (1965)	Bud Yorkin
New Faces of 1952	Ronny Graham; Mel Brooks	New Faces (1954)	Harry Horner
The New Henrietta (1913)	Bronson Howard; Victor Mapes; Winchell Smith	The Lamb (1915)	Christy Cabanne
The New Henrietta (1913)	Bronson Howard; Victor Mapes; Winchell Smith	The Saphead (1920)	Herbert Blaché; Winchell Smith
The New Moon (1927)	Oscar Hammerstein II	New Moon (1940)	Robert Z. Leonard
The New York Idea (1907)	Langdon Mitchell	The New York Idea (1920)	Herbert Blache
New York Town	Ward Morehouse	Big City Blues (1932)	Mervyn LeRoy
Next of Kin	Lonnie Coleman	Hot Spell (1958)	Daniel Mann
Nice Girl?	Phyllis Duganne	Nice Girl? (1941)	William A. Seiter
Nice People (1921)	Rachel Crothers	Nice People (1922)	William C. deMille
The Nightcap (1922)	Guy Bolton; Max Marcin	Secrets of the Night (1924)	Herbert Blaché
The Night Before Christmas	S. J. Perelman; Laura Perelman	Larceny, Inc. (1942)	Lloyd Bacon
Night Court	Mark Hellinger	Night Court (1932)	W. S. Van Dyke
A Night Like This (1930)	Ben Travers	A Night Like This (1932)	Tom Walls
'night, Mother (1982)	Marsha Norman	'night, Mother (1986)	Tom Moore
Night Must Fall (1935)	Emlyn Williams	Night Must Fall (1937)	Richard Thorpe
Night Must Fall (1935)	Emlyn Williams	Night Must Fall (1964)	Karel Reisz
Night of January 16th (1934)	Ayn Rand	The Night of January 16th (1941)	William Clemens
The Night of the Iguana (1961)	Tennessee Williams	The Night of the Iguana (1964)	John Huston
Nightstick	Elaine Sterne Carrington; J.C. Nugent; Elliott Nugent; John Wray	Alibi (1929)	Roland West
Night Watch (1972)	Lucille Fletcher	Night Watch (1973)	Brian G. Hutton
Nilo, mi hijo (1963)	Antonio González Caballero	La casa del pelícano (1977)	Sergio Véjar
Nine till Six (1930)	Aimée Stuart; Philip Stuart	Nine till Six (1932)	Basil Dean
Ninette, modas de París	Miguel Mihura	Ninette (2005)	José Luis Garci
Ninette y un señor de Murcia	Miguel Mihura	Ninette (2005)	José Luis Garci
Niniche (1878)	Albert Millaud; Alfred Hennequin	Niniche (1918)	Camillo De Riso
Niobe (All Smiles) (1895)	Edward A. Paulton; Harry Paulton	Niobe (1915)	Hugh Ford; Edwin S. Porter
Nobody's Money (1921)	William LeBaron	Nobody's Money (1923)	Wallace Worsley
Nobody's Widow (1910)	Avery Hopwood	Nobody's Widow (1927)	Donald Crisp
No Crime of Passion	Hubert G. Griffith	Betrayal (1932)	Reginald Fogwell
No Exit (1944)	Jean-Paul Sartre	Huis clos (1954)	Jacqueline Audry
No Exit (1944)	Jean-Paul Sartre	Closed Door (1962)	Pedro Escudero
No Exit (1944)	Jean-Paul Sartre	No Exit (1962)	Tad Danielewski
Noises Off (1982)	Michael Frayn	Noises Off... (1992)	Peter Bogdanovich
Noix de coco (1935)	Marcel Achard	Cocoanut (1939)	Jean Boyer
No Names, No Pack Drill	Bob Herbert	Rebel (1985)	Michael Jenkins
Noose	Richard Llewellyn	Noose (1948)	Edmond T. Gréville
The Noose (1926)	Willard Mack	The Noose (1928)	John Francis Dillon
The Noose (1926)	Willard Mack	I'd Give My Life (1936)	Edwin L. Marin
The Normal Heart (1985)	Larry Kramer	The Normal Heart (2014)	Ryan Murphy
Norman, Is That You? (1970)	Sam Bobrick; Ron Clark	Norman... Is That You? (1976)	George Schlatter
No Room at the Inn (1945)	Daniel Birt	No Room at the Inn (1948)	Daniel Birt
Nos deux consciences (1902)	Paul Anthelme Bourde	I Confess (1953)	Alfred Hitchcock
Nostra Signora dei Turchi	Carmelo Bene	Our Lady of the Turks (1968)	Carmelo Bene
Not Herbert	Howard Irving Young	The Perfect Sap (1927)	Howard Higgin
No Time for Comedy (1939)	S. N. Behrman	No Time for Comedy (1940)	William Keighley
Not Now, Darling (1967)	Ray Cooney; John Chapman	Not Now, Darling (1973)	Ray Cooney; David Croft
No Time for Sergeants (1955)	Ira Levin	No Time for Sergeants (1958)	Mervyn LeRoy
Not Quite Jerusalem (1982)	Paul Kember	Not Quite Paradise (1985)	Lewis Gilbert
Nothing But the Truth (1916)	James Montgomery	The Pure Truth (1931)	Manuel Romero; Florián Rey
Nothing But the Truth (1916)	James Montgomery	Nothing but the Truth (1929)	Victor Schertzinger
Nothing But the Truth (1916)	James Montgomery	Nothing but the Truth (1941)	Elliott Nugent
Novas Diretrizes em Tempos de Paz	Bosco Brasil	Peacetime (2009)	Daniel Filho
Novecento	Alessandro Baricco	The Legend of 1900 (1998)	Giuseppe Tornatore
Now Barabbas (1947)	William Douglas Home	Now Barabbas (1949)	Gordon Parry
Nukegara	Norihiko Tsukada	Shed Skin Papa (2016)	Roy Szeto
Number 17	Joseph Jefferson Farjeon	Number 17 (1928)	Géza von Bolváry
Number 17	Joseph Jefferson Farjeon	Number Seventeen (1932)	Alfred Hitchcock
Number 17	Joseph Jefferson Farjeon	Number 17 (1949)	Gösta Stevens
Nunzio	Spiro Scimone	Two Friends (2002)	Spiro Scimone; Francesco Sframeli
Nurse Marjorie	Israel Zangwill	Nurse Marjorie (1920)	William Desmond Taylor
Nuts (1979)	Tom Topor	Nuts (1987)	Martin Ritt
'Nu turco napulitano (1888)	Eduardo Scarpetta	Neapolitan Turk (1953)	Mario Mattoli

=== O ===
Play	Playwright	Film	Film director
Occupe-toi d'Amélie! (1908)	Georges Feydeau	Take Care of Amelia (1925)	Telemaco Ruggeri
Occupe-toi d'Amélie! (1908)	Georges Feydeau	Take Care of Amelie (1932)	Marguerite Viel
Occupe-toi d'Amélie! (1908)	Georges Feydeau	Keep an Eye on Amelia (1949)	Claude Autant-Lara
The Odd Couple (1965)	Neil Simon	The Odd Couple (1968)	Gene Saks
Ode to Liberty (1934)	Sidney Howard	He Stayed for Breakfast (1940)	Alexander Hall
Odette (1881)	Victorien Sardou	Odette (1916 film)	Giuseppe de Liguoro
Odette (1881)	Victorien Sardou	Odette (1928 film)	Luitz-Morat
Odette (1881)	Victorien Sardou	Odette (1934 film)	Jacques Houssin
Odette (1881)	Victorien Sardou	Distress (1946)	Robert-Paul Dagan
Oedipus Rex (429 BC)	Sophocles	Oedipus Rex (1957)	Tyrone Guthrie
Oedipus Rex (429 BC)	Sophocles	Oedipus Rex (1967)	Pier Paolo Pasolini
Oedipus Rex (429 BC)	Sophocles	Oedipus the King (1968)	Philip Saville
Oedipus Rex (429 BC)	Sophocles	Butcher, Baker, Nightmare Maker (1981)	William Asher
Oedipus Rex (429 BC)	Sophocles	Oedipus Mayor (1996)	Jorge Alí Triana
Oedipus at Colonus (401 BC)	Sophocles	Hercules Unchained (1959)	Pietro Francisci
Official Secret	Jeffrey Dell	Spies of the Air (1939)	David MacDonald
Off the Map	Joan Ackermann	Off the Map (2003)	Campbell Scott
Off the Record	John Hay Beith; Stephen King-Hall	Carry On Admiral (1957)	Val Guest
Of Mice and Men (1937)	John Steinbeck	Of Mice and Men (1939)	Lewis Milestone
Ofoti (1966)	John Wheatcroft	The Boy Who Loved Trolls (1984, TV)	Harvey Laidman
O Gebo e a Sombra (1923)	Raul Brandão	Gebo and the Shadow (2012)	Manoel de Oliveira
Oh, Boy! (1917)	Guy Bolton; P. G. Wodehouse	Oh, Boy! (1919)	Albert Capellani
Oh Brother (1945)	Jacques Deval	Miss Tatlock's Millions (1948)	Richard Haydn
Oh Dad, Poor Dad, Mamma's Hung You in the Closet and I'm Feelin' So Sad (1961)	Arthur Kopit	Oh Dad, Poor Dad, Mamma's Hung You in the Closet and I'm Feelin' So Sad (1967)	Richard Quine
Oh, Kay! (1926)	Guy Bolton; P. G. Wodehouse	Oh, Kay! (1928)	Mervyn LeRoy
Oh, Lady! Lady!! (1918)	Guy Bolton; P. G. Wodehouse	Oh, Lady, Lady (1920)	Maurice S. Campbell
Oh, Men! Oh, Women!	Nunnally Johnson	Oh, Men! Oh, Women! (1957)	Edward Chodorov
Oh, Promise Me (1930)	Howard Lindsay; Bertrand Robinson	Love, Honor, and Oh Baby! (1933)	Edward Buzzell
Oklahoma! (1943)	Oscar Hammerstein II	Oklahoma! (1955)	Fred Zinnemann
Old Acquaintance (1940)	John Van Druten	Old Acquaintance (1940)	Vincent Sherman
Old Acquaintance (1940)	John Van Druten	Rich and Famous (1981)	George Cukor
Old English (1924)	John Galsworthy	Old English (1930)	Alfred E. Green
Old Explorers (1978)	James Cada; Mark Keller	Old Explorers (1990)	Bill Pohlad
Old Heidelberg (1901)	Joseph Victor von Scheffel	Old Heidelberg (1915)	John Emerson
Old Heidelberg (1901)	Joseph Victor von Scheffel	Old Heidelberg (1923)	Hans Behrendt
Old Heidelberg (1901)	Joseph Victor von Scheffel	The Student Prince in Old Heidelberg (1927)	Ernst Lubitsch
Old Heidelberg (1901)	Joseph Victor von Scheffel	The Student Prince (1954)	Richard Thorpe
The Old Homestead (1886)	Denman Thompson; George W. Ryer	The Old Homestead (1915)	James Kirkwood Sr.
The Old Homestead (1886)	Denman Thompson; George W. Ryer	The Old Homestead (1922)	James Cruze
The Old Homestead (1886)	Denman Thompson; George W. Ryer	The Old Homestead (1935)	William Nigh
Old Lady 31 (1916)	Rachel Crothers	Old Lady 31 (1920)	John Ince
Old Lady 31 (1916)	Rachel Crothers	The Captain Is a Lady (1940)	Robert B. Sinclair
The Old Maid (1935)	Zoë Akins	The Old Maid (1939)	Edmund Goulding
Old Man Murphy (1931)	Patrick Kearney	His Family Tree (1935)	Charles Vidor
The Old Soak (1921)	Don Marquis	The Old Soak (1926)	Edward Sloman
Oleanna (1992)	David Mamet	Oleanna (1994)	David Mamet
Olympia (1928)	Ferenc Molnár	His Glorious Night (1929)	Lionel Barrymore
Olympia (1928)	Ferenc Molnár	A Breath of Scandal (1960)	Michael Curtiz
O miedeco d'e pazze (1908)	Eduardo Scarpetta	The Doctor of the Mad (1954)	Mario Mattoli
On Approval (1926)	Frederick Lonsdale	On Approval (1930)	Tom Walls
On Approval (1926)	Frederick Lonsdale	On Approval (1944)	Clive Brook
On Borrowed Time (1938)	Paul Osborn	On Borrowed Time (1939)	Harold S. Bucquet
Once a Crook (1939)	Evadne Price; Ken Attiwell	Once a Crook (1941)	Herbert Mason
Once in a Lifetime (1930)	Moss Hart; George S. Kaufman	Once in a Lifetime (1932)	Russell Mack
Once More, with Feeling (1958)	Harry Kurnitz	Once More, with Feeling! (1960)	Stanley Donen
One Flew Over the Cuckoo's Nest (1963)	Ken Kesey	One Flew Over the Cuckoo's Nest (1975)	Miloš Forman
One Night in Istanbul (2009)	Nicky Allt	One Night in Istanbul (2014)	James Marquand
One Night Stand (1977)	Carol Bolt	One Night Stand (1978)	Allan King
One of the Best	Seymour Hicks	One of the Best (1927)	T. Hayes Hunter
One of Our Girls (1885)	Bronson Howard	One of Our Girls (1914)	Thomas N. Heffron
One Sunday Afternoon	James Hagan	One Sunday Afternoon (1933)	Stephen Roberts
One Sunday Afternoon	James Hagan	The Strawberry Blonde (1941)	Raoul Walsh
One Sunday Afternoon	James Hagan	One Sunday Afternoon (1948)	Raoul Walsh
One Touch of Venus (1943)	Ogden Nash; S. J. Perelman	One Touch of Venus (1948)	William A. Seiter
One Way Pendulum (1959)	N. F. Simpson	One Way Pendulum (1965)	Peter Yates
One Wild Oat	Vernon Sylvaine	One Wild Oat (1951)	Charles Saunders
On Golden Pond (1979)	Ernest Thompson	On Golden Pond (1981)	Mark Rydell
On Golden Pond (2001)	Marty Pasetta		
Only a Dream (1909)	Lothar Schmidt	The Marriage Circle (1924)	Ernst Lubitsch
Only a Dream (1909)	Lothar Schmidt	One Hour with You (1932)	George Cukor
The Only Game in Town (1968)	Frank D. Gilroy	The Only Game in Town (1970)	George Stevens
The Only Son (1911)	Winchell Smith	The Only Son (1914)	Oscar Apfel; Cecil B. DeMille
The Only Way	Frederick Longbridge; Freeman Wills	The Only Way (1926)	Herbert Wilcox
On ne badine pas avec l'amour (1834)	Alfred de Musset	One Does Not Play with Love (1926)	G. W. Pabst
On purge bébé! (1910)	Georges Feydeau	On purge bébé (1931)	Jean Renoir
On the Quiet (1901)	Augustus Thomas	On the Quiet (1918)	Chester Withey
On Trial (1914)	Elmer Rice	On Trial (1928)	Archie Mayo
On Trial (1914)	Elmer Rice	On Trial (1939)	Terry O. Morse
O Pagador de Promessas	Dias Gomes	O Pagador de Promessas (1962)	Anselmo Duarte
An Optimistic Tragedy (1933)	Vsevolod Vishnevsky	Optimistic Tragedy (1963)	Samson Samsonov
The Orchard Walls (1953)	R. F. Delderfield	Now and Forever (1956)	Mario Zampi
Orders Are Orders (1932)	Ian Hay; Anthony Armstrong	Orders Is Orders (1933)	Walter Forde
Orders Are Orders (1932)	Ian Hay; Anthony Armstrong	Orders Are Orders (1955)	David Paltenghi
Ordet (1932)	Kaj Munk	The Word (1943 film)	Gustaf Molander
Ordet (1932)	Kaj Munk	Ordet (1955)	Carl Theodor Dreyer
An Ordinary Miracle	Evgeny Schwartz	An Ordinary Miracle (1964)	Erast Garin; Khesya Lokshina
An Ordinary Miracle	Evgeny Schwartz	An Ordinary Miracle (1978)	Mark Zakharov
Oresteia (5th century BCE)	Aeschylus	The Forgotten Pistolero (1969)	Ferdinando Baldi
Orfeu da Conceição (1956)	Vinicius de Moraes	Black Orpheus (1959)	Marcel Camus
Orfeu da Conceição (1956)	Vinicius de Moraes	Orfeu (1999)	Carlos Diegues
The Orphan of Zhao (13th century)	Ji Junxiang	Sacrifice (2010)	Chen Kaige
Orphans (1983)	Lyle Kessler	Orphans (1987)	Alan J. Pakula
Orpheus Descending (1957)	Tennessee Williams	The Fugitive Kind (1960)	Sidney Lumet
Orpheus Descending (1957)	Tennessee Williams	Orpheus Descending (film) (1990)	Peter Hall
Oscar (1958)	Claude Magnier	Oskar (1962)	Gabriel Axel
Oscar (1958)	Claude Magnier	Oscar (1967)	Édouard Molinaro
Oscar (1958)	Claude Magnier	Oscar (1991)	John Landis
O scrisoare pierdută (1884)	Ion Luca Caragiale	A Lost Letter (1953)	Victor Iliu; Sică Alexandrescu
Os Homens São de Marte... E é pra Lá que Eu Vou!	Mônica Martelli	Os Homens São de Marte... E é pra Lá que Eu Vou! (2014)	Marcus Baldini
Other Men's Wives (1928)	Walter Hackett	Sweethearts and Wives (1930)	Clarence G. Badger
Other People's Money: The Ultimate Seduction (1989)	Jerry Sterner	Other People's Money (1991)	Norman Jewison
Other Times (1920)	Harold Brighouse	Children of Jazz (1923)	Jerome Storm
Our Betters (1917)	W. Somerset Maugham	Our Betters (1933)	George Cukor
Our Mrs. McChesney (1915)	Edna Ferber; George V. Hobart	Our Mrs. McChesney (1918)	Ralph Ince
Our Town (1938)	Thornton Wilder	Our Town (1940)	Sam Wood
Our Town (1938)	Thornton Wilder	Our Town (1955)	Delbert Mann
Our Town (1938)	Thornton Wilder	Our Town (2003)	James Naughton
Our Wife (1933)	Lillian Day; Lyon Mearson	Our Wife (1941)	John M. Stahl
Outcast (1914)	Hubert Henry Davies	The World and the Woman (1916)	Frank Lloyd
Outcast (1914)	Hubert Henry Davies	Outcast (1917 film)	Dell Henderson
Outcast (1914)	Hubert Henry Davies	Outcast (1922 film)	Chester Withey
Outcast (1914)	Hubert Henry Davies	Outcast (1928 film)	William A. Seiter
Outcast (1914)	Hubert Henry Davies	The Girl from 10th Avenue (1935)	Alfred E. Green
Out of the Frying Pan (1941)	Francis Swann	Young and Willing (1943)	Edward H. Griffith
Out to Win (1921)	Roland Pertwee; Dion Clayton Calthrop	Out to Win (1923)	Denison Clift
Outward Bound (1923)	Sutton Vane	Outward Bound (1930)	Robert Milton
Outward Bound (1923)	Sutton Vane	Between Two Worlds (1944)	Edward A. Blatt
Over 21 (1944)	Ruth Gordon	Over 21 (1945)	Charles Vidor
Over She Goes	Stanley Lupino	Over She Goes (1937)	Graham Cutts
O voto	Salvatore Di Giacomo	The Vow (1950)	Mario Bonnard
The Owl and the Pussycat (1964)	Bill Manhoff	The Owl and the Pussycat (1970)	Herbert Ross

=== P ===
Play	Playwright	Film	Film director
Paddy the Next Best Thing (1920)	Gayer Mackay; Robert Ord	Paddy the Next Best Thing (1933)	Harry Lachman
Pagan Lady (1930)	William DuBois	The Pagan Lady (1931)	John Francis Dillon
Page Miss Glory (1934)	Philip Dunning; Joseph Schrank	Page Miss Glory (1935)	Mervyn LeRoy
Paid in Full (1908)	Eugene Walter	Paid in Full (1919)	Emile Chautard
A Pair of Claws (1983)	Michael Gurr	Departure (1986)	Brian Kavanagh
A Pair of Silk Stockings (1914)	Cyril Harcourt	They Just Had to Get Married (1932)	Edward Ludwig
Pals First	Francis Perry Elliott	Pals First (1926)	Edwin Carewe
Paméla (1898)	Victorien Sardou	Pamela (1945)	Pierre de Hérain
Panama Hattie (1940)	Herbert Fields; B. G. DeSylva; Cole Porter	Panama Hattie (1942)	Norman Z. McLeod
Pandora's Box (1904)	Frank Wedekind	Pandora's Box (1929)	G. W. Pabst
Papa się żeni (1926)	Wincenty Rapacki	Daddy Gets Married (1936)	Michał Waszyński
The Paragon (1948)	Michael Pertwee; Roland Pertwee	Silent Dust (1949)	Lance Comfort
Pardon My Glove	Zoe Akins	Ladies Love Brutes (1930)	Rowland V. Lee
Paris (1928)	Martin Brown; Cole Porter	Paris (1929)	Clarence G. Badger
Paris Bound (1927)	Philip Barry	Paris Bound (1929)	Edward H. Griffith
Partners Again (1922)	Montague Glass; Jules Eckert Goodman	Partners Again (1926)	Henry King
Passing Brompton Road	Jevan Brandon-Thomas	Her Reputation (1931)	Sidney Morgan
The Passing of the Third Floor Back (1908)	Jerome K. Jerome	The Passing of the Third Floor Back (1918)	Herbert Brenon
The Passing of the Third Floor Back (1908)	Jerome K. Jerome	The Passing of the Third Floor Back (1935)	Berthold Viertel
Passy 08-45 (1927)	Alfred Savoir	Ladies Should Listen (1934)	Frank Tuttle
Pastor Hall (1939)	Ernst Toller	Pastor Hall (1940)	Roy Boulting
Patachon (1907)	Félix Duquesnel; Maurice Hennequin	The Gay Deceiver (1926)	John M. Stahl
Patate (1957)	Marcel Achard	Patate (1964)	Robert Thomas
Pater noster	Jacobo Langsner	Bad Company (1986)	José Santiso
Patrie! (1869)	Victorien Sardou	Patrie (1917)	Albert Capellani
Patrie! (1869)	Victorien Sardou	Patrie (1946)	Louis Daquin
Patterns (1955)	Rod Serling	Patterns (1956)	Fielder Cook
The Patsy (1925)	Barry Conners	The Patsy (1928)	King Vidor
Payment Deferred (1931)	Jeffrey Dell	Payment Deferred (1932)	Lothar Mendes
Peer Gynt (1876}	Henrik Ibsen	Peer Gynt (1915)	Oscar Apfel; Raoul Walsh
Peer Gynt (1876}	Henrik Ibsen	Peer Gynt (1919)	Richard Oswald; Victor Barnowsky
Peer Gynt (1876}	Henrik Ibsen	Peer Gynt (1934)	Fritz Wendhausen
Peer Gynt (1876}	Henrik Ibsen	Peer Gynt (1941)	David Bradley
Peg o' My Heart (1912)	J. Hartley Manners	Peg o' My Heart (1933)	Robert Z. Leonard
Penny Arcade (1930)	Marie Baumer	Sinners' Holiday (1930)	John G. Adolfi
The Perfect Gentleman	Edward Childs Carpenter	The Perfect Gentleman (1935)	Tim Whelan
The Perfect Marriage (1944)	Samson Raphaelson	The Perfect Marriage (1947)	Lewis Allen
Perfect Pie (2000)	Judith Thompson	Perfect Pie (2002)	Barbara Willis Sweete
A Performance of Hamlet in the Village of Mrduša Donja (1971)	Ivo Brešan	A Performance of Hamlet in the Village of Mrduša Donja (1973)	Krsto Papić
Period of Adjustment (1960)	Tennessee Williams	Period of Adjustment (1962)	George Roy Hill
Perlenkomödie (1929)	Bruno Frank	Different Morals (1931)	Gerhard Lamprecht
Personal Appearance (1934)	Lawrence Riley	Go West, Young Man (1936)	Henry Hathaway
Peter and Vandy (2002)	Jay DiPietro	Peter and Vandy (2009)	Jay DiPietro
Peter Pan; or, the Boy Who Wouldn't Grow Up (1904)	J. M. Barrie	Peter Pan (1924)	Herbert Brenon
Peter Pan; or, the Boy Who Wouldn't Grow Up (1904)	J. M. Barrie	Peter Pan (1953)	Hamilton Luske; Clyde Geronimi; Wilfred Jackson
Peter Pan; or, the Boy Who Wouldn't Grow Up (1904)	J. M. Barrie	Peter Pan (1976)	Dwight Hemion
Peter Pan; or, the Boy Who Wouldn't Grow Up (1904)	J. M. Barrie	Peter Pan (1988)	David Cherkasskiy; Richard Trueblood
Peter Pan; or, the Boy Who Wouldn't Grow Up (1904)	J. M. Barrie	Peter Pan (2003)	P. J. Hogan
The Petrified Forest (1935)	Robert E. Sherwood	The Petrified Forest (1936)	Archie Mayo
The Phantom Lady (1629)	Pedro Calderón de la Barca	The Phantom Lady (1945)	Luis Saslavsky
Phfft: Chronicle of a Happy Divorce	George Axelrod	Phffft (1954)	Mark Robson
Philadelphia, Here I Come! (1964)	Brian Friel	Philadelphia, Here I Come! (1977)	John Quested
The Philadelphia Story (1939)	Philip Barry	The Philadelphia Story (1940)	George Cukor
The Philadelphia Story (1939)	Philip Barry	High Society (1956)	Charles Walters
Phyro-Giants!	Michael Blieden	Melvin Goes to Dinner (2003)	Bob Odenkirk
The Physician (1897)	Henry Arthur Jones	The Physician (1928)	Georg Jacoby
The Piano Lesson (1987)	August Wilson	The Piano Lesson (1995)	Lloyd Richards
Picnic (1953)	William Inge	Picnic (1955)	Joshua Logan
Pictures from the Insects' Life (1921)	Brothers Čapek	Insects (2018)	Jan Švankmajer
Pierre ou Jack (1931)	Francis de Croisset	Head over Heels	Sonnie Hale
The Pillars of Society (1877)	Henrik Ibsen	Pillars of Society (1920)	Rex Wilson
Pillar to Post (1943)	Rose Simon Kohn	Pillow to Post (1945)	Vincent Sherman
The Pirate (1942)	S. N. Behrman	The Pirate (1948)	Vincente Minnelli
The Playboy of the Western World (1907)	John Millington Synge	The Playboy of the Western World (1962)	Brian Desmond Hurst
Play It Again, Sam (1969)	Woody Allen	Play It Again, Sam (1972)	Herbert Ross
Plaza Suite (1968)	Neil Simon	Plaza Suite (1971)	Arthur Hiller
Please Help Emily	H. M. Harwood	The Palm Beach Girl (1926)	Erle C. Kenton
Please Stand By (2008)	Michael Golamco	Please Stand By (2017)	Ben Lewin
The Pleasure of His Company (1958)	Samuel A. Taylor; Cornelia Otis Skinner	The Pleasure of His Company (1961)	George Seaton
Plenty (1978)	David Hare	Plenty (1985)	Fred Schepisi
The Plough and the Stars (1926)	Seán O'Casey	The Plough and the Stars (1937)	John Ford
Plunder (1928)	Ben Travers	Plunder 1931)	Tom Walls
Point of Death	Michael Cooney	The I Inside (2003)	Roland Suso Richter
Poison Pen (1937)	Richard Llewellyn	Poison Pen (1939)	Paul L. Stein
Poliche (1906)	Henry Bataille	Poliche (1934)	Abel Gance
Polly of the Circus (1907)	Margaret Mayo	Polly of the Circus (1917)	Charles T. Horan; Edwin L. Hollywood
Polly of the Circus (1907)	Margaret Mayo	Polly of the Circus (1932)	Alfred Santell
Polly With a Past	Guy Bolton; George Middleton	Polly With a Past (1920)	Leander de Cordova
The Poltergeist (1946)	Frank Harvey	Things Happen at Night (1947)	Francis Searle
The Pony Cart	Roger Garis	Never Take Sweets from a Stranger (1960)	Cyril Frankel
The Poor Little Rich Girl (1912)	Eleanor Gates	The Poor Little Rich Girl (1917)	Maurice Tourneur
Poor Super Man	Brad Fraser	Leaving Metropolis (2002)	Brad Fraser
Poppy (1923)	Howard Dietz; Dorothy Donnelly; W. C. Fields	Sally of the Sawdust (1925)	D. W. Griffith
Poppy (1923)	Howard Dietz; Dorothy Donnelly; W. C. Fields	Poppy (1936)	A. Edward Sutherland
Porgy and Bess	DuBose Heyward; Ira Gershwin	Porgy and Bess (1959)	Otto Preminger
The Porter from Maxim's (1923, French: Le chasseur de chez Maxim's)	Yves Mirande; Gustave Quinson	The Porter from Maxim's (1927)	Roger Lion
The Porter from Maxim's (1923, French: Le chasseur de chez Maxim's)	Yves Mirande; Gustave Quinson	The Porter from Maxim's (1933)	Karl Anton
The Porter from Maxim's (1923, French: Le chasseur de chez Maxim's)	Yves Mirande; Gustave Quinson	The Porter from Maxim's (1939)	Maurice Cammage
The Porter from Maxim's (1923, French: Le chasseur de chez Maxim's)	Yves Mirande; Gustave Quinson	The Porter from Maxim's (1953)	Henri Diamant-Berger
The Porter from Maxim's (1923, French: Le chasseur de chez Maxim's)	Yves Mirande; Gustave Quinson	The Porter from Maxim's (1976)	Claude Vital
Portrait in Black	Ivan Goff; Ben Roberts	Portrait in Black (1960)	Michael Gordon
Posh (2010)	Laura Wade	The Riot Club (2014)	Lone Scherfig
Possible Worlds (1990)	John Mighton	Possible Worlds (2000)	Robert Lepage
Potiche	Pierre Barillet; Jean-Pierre Gredy	Potiche (2010)	François Ozon
The Potters (1923)	J. P. McElvoy	The Potters (1927)	Fred C. Newmeyer
Pour avoir Adrienne	Louis Verneuil	The Cheeky Devil (1932)	Carl Boese; Heinz Hille
Pour avoir Adrienne	Louis Verneuil	The Love Habit (1931)	Harry Lachman
Pour avoir Adrienne	Louis Verneuil	You Will Be My Wife (1932)	Carl Boese; Heinz Hille; Serge de Poligny
Powder Keg (1994)	Dejan Dukovski	Cabaret Balkan (1998)	Goran Paskaljević
Potash and Perlmutter (1913)	Charles Klein; Montague Glass	Potash and Perlmutter (1923)	Clarence G. Badger
Potash and Perlmutter (1913)	Charles Klein; Montague Glass	In Hollywood with Potash and Perlmutter (1924)	Alfred E. Green
Precious (1929)	James Forbes	Bachelor's Affairs (1932)	Alfred L. Werker
Prelude to a Kiss (1988)	Craig Lucas	Prelude to a Kiss (1992)	Norman René
Present Arms (1928)	Herbert Fields	Leathernecking (1930)	Edward F. Cline
A Present from Margate (1933)	Ian Hay; A.E.W. Mason	The Widow from Monte Carlo (1935)	Arthur Greville Collins
The Priest of Kirchfeld (1870)	Ludwig Anzengruber	The Priest from Kirchfeld (1914)	Jacob Fleck; Luise Fleck
The Priest of Kirchfeld (1870)	Ludwig Anzengruber	The Priest from Kirchfeld (1926)	Jacob Fleck; Luise Fleck
The Priest of Kirchfeld (1870)	Ludwig Anzengruber	The Priest from Kirchfeld (1937)	Jacob Fleck; Luise Fleck
The Priest of Kirchfeld (1870)	Ludwig Anzengruber	The Priest from Kirchfeld (1955)	Hans Deppe
The Priest of Kirchfeld (1870)	Ludwig Anzengruber	Das Mädchen vom Pfarrhof (1955)	Alfred Lehner
The Prime of Miss Jean Brodie (1966)	Jay Presson Allen	The Prime of Miss Jean Brodie (1969)	Ronald Neame
Primrose Path (1938)	Robert H. Buckner	Primrose Path (film) (1940)	Gregory La Cava
The Primrose Path (1907)	Bayard Veiller	Burnt Wings (1920)	Christy Cabanne
The Prince (1970)	George Tabori	Leo the Last (1970)	John Boorman
The Prince and the Beggar Maid (1908)	Walter Howard	The Prince and the Beggarmaid (1921)	A. V. Bramble
Prince Jean	Charles Méré	Prince Jean (1928)	René Hervil
Prince Jean	Charles Méré	Prince Jean (1934)	Jean de Marguenat
The Prince of Homburg (1810)	Heinrich von Kleist	The Prince of Homburg (1997)	Marco Bellocchio
Princess Zim-Zim (1911)	Edward Sheldon	A Coney Island Princess (1916)	Dell Henderson
A Prince There Was	George M. Cohan	A Prince There Was (1921)	Tom Forman
Prison Without Bars (1936)	Gina Kaus	Prison Without Bars (1938)	[[ {{{last}}}]]
The Prisoner of Second Avenue (1971)	Neil Simon	The Prisoner of Second Avenue (1975)	Melvin Frank
The Private Ear	Peter Shaffer	The Pad and How to Use It (1966)	Brian G. Hutton
Private Fears in Public Places (2004)	Alan Ayckbourn	Private Fears in Public Places (2006)	Alain Resnais
Private Lives (1930)	Noël Coward	Private Lives (1931)	Sidney Franklin
Private Lives (1930)	Noël Coward	The Terrible Lovers (1936)	Marc Allégret
Privates on Parade	Peter Nichols	Privates on Parade (1982)	Michael Blakemore
Profesionalac (1990)	[[ {{{last}}}]]	The Professional (2003)	Dušan Kovačević
Proof	David Auburn	Proof (2005)	John Madden
Prude's Fall	Rudolf Besier	The Prude's Fall (1925)	Graham Cutts
Psycho Beach Party (1987)	Charles Busch	Psycho Beach Party (2000)	Robert Lee King
The Public Eye (1962)	Peter Shaffer	Follow Me! (1972)	Carol Reed
Public Speaking	Chris Craddock	It's Not My Fault and I Don't Care Anyway (2017)	Chris Craddock
Purlie Victorious (1961)	Ossie Davis	Gone Are the Days! (1963)	Nicholas Webster
Pygmalion (1913)	George Bernard Shaw	Pygmalion (1938)	Anthony Asquith; Leslie Howard
Pygmalion (1913)	George Bernard Shaw	My Fair Lady (1964)	George Cukor
Pygmalion (1913)	George Bernard Shaw	Pygmalion (1983)	Alan Cooke

=== Q ===
Play	Playwright	Film	Film director
Quality Street (1901)	J. M. Barrie	Quality Street (1927)	Sidney Franklin
Quality Street (1901)	J. M. Barrie	Quality Street (1937)	George Stevens
Qualquer Gato Vira-Lata tem uma Vida Sexual Mais Saudável que a Nossa (1998)	Juca de Oliveira	Qualquer Gato Vira-Lata (2011)	Tomas Portella
Quarantine (1922)	F. Tennyson Jesse	Lovers in Quarantine (1925)	Frank Tuttle
The Quare Fellow (1954)	Brendan Behan	The Quare Fellow (1962)	Arthur Dreifuss
Quartet (1999)	Ronald Harwood	Quartet (2012)	Dustin Hoffman
The Queen's Husband	Robert E. Sherwood	The Royal Bed (1931)	Lowell Sherman
The Queen Was in the Parlour (1926)	Noël Coward	The Queen Was in the Parlour (1927)	Graham Cutts
The Queen Was in the Parlour (1926)	Noël Coward	Tonight Is Ours (1933)	Stuart Armstrong Walker
Queer Cargo	Noel Langley	Queer Cargo (1938)	Harold D. Schuster
The Queer Fish	William Matthew Scott	His Wife's Mother (1932)	Harry Hughes
Questi fantasmi (1946)	Eduardo De Filippo	Ghosts – Italian Style (1967)	Renato Castellani
Quiet Wedding (1938)	Esther McCracken	Quiet Wedding (1941)	Anthony Asquith
Quiet Wedding (1938)	Esther McCracken	Happy Is the Bride (1958)	Roy Boulting
Quills (1995)	Doug Wright	Quills (2000)	Philip Kaufman
Quinneys (1914)	Horace Annesley Vachell	Quinneys (1919)	Herbert Brenon; Maurice Elvey
Quinneys (1914)	Horace Annesley Vachell	Quinneys (1927)	Maurice Elvey

== See also ==
- List of plays adapted into feature films: A to I
- List of plays adapted into feature films: R to Z
- Film adaptation
- Lists of film source material
- List of musicals adapted into feature films
- Category:Films based on works by William Shakespeare
- List of William Shakespeare screen adaptations
