= Lists of plays adapted into feature films =

The List of plays adapted into feature films has been split into three parts.

- List of plays adapted into feature films: A to I
- List of plays adapted into feature films: J to Q
- List of plays adapted into feature films: R to Z
