= Take Care of Amelie =

1932 film

- Directed by: Marguerite Viel; Richard Weisbach
- Written by: Georges Feydeau (play); Louis Hennevé
- Cinematography: Nikolai Toporkoff
- Music by: Charles Cuvillier
- Production company: As-Film
- Distributed by: Gaumont-Franco Film-Aubert
- Release date: 7 December 1932
- Running time: 107 minutes
- Country: France
- Language: French

Take Care of Amelie (French: Occupe-toi d'Amélie) is a 1932 French comedy film directed by Marguerite Viel and Richard Weisbach. It is based on the 1908 play Occupe-toi d'Amélie by Georges Feydeau, which was later adapted into the 1949 film Keep an Eye on Amelia.

== Cast ==
- Renée Bartout as Amélie
- Aimé Clariond
- Raymond Dandy as Prince
- Arthur Devère as Van Putzeboum
- Caro Devère
- René Donnio as Général
- Vivian Grey
- Robert Guillon
- Yvonne Hébert as Irène
- Georges Jamin
- Fred Marche
- Titys
- Jean Weber as Marcel
- Yvonne Yma

== Bibliography ==
- Goble, Alan. The Complete Index to Literary Sources in Film. Walter de Gruyter, 1999.
