= The Boy Who Loved Trolls =

1984 American fantasy-adventure film

- VHS cover
- Genre: Fantasy
- Based on: play by John Wheatcroft
- Screenplay by: James A. DeVinney
- Directed by: Harvey Laidman
- Starring: Matt Dill; Sam Waterston; Susan Anton
- Narrated by: Richard B. Shull
- Theme music composer: Casey Filiaci; Ferdinand Jay Smith III
- Country of origin: United States
- Original language: English

Production
- Producer: Bob Walsh
- Production location: Pittsburgh
- Editors: Gary Hines; Neil Travis
- Running time: 58 min.

Original release
- Network: PBS
- Release: October 29, 1984

The Boy Who Loved Trolls is a 1984 American made-for-television fantasy-adventure film produced for the PBS series WonderWorks.

The story was adapted by James A. DeVinney from a play by John Wheatcroft. The original play, entitled Ofoti, was telecast in 1966, on NET Playhouse, winning a National Television Award that year for best original television play.

== Plot ==
12-year-old Paul would like nothing more than for the magical trolls and mermaids he reads about in his favorite story to be real. He goes searching for a real troll and finally meets one named Ofoeti, who has friends like Kalotte, a mermaid, and Socrates, a talking turtle. Soon the mermaid's home is threatened by an evil bridge builder. Paul also discovers that Ofoeti is dying and has less than a day to live. Paul must see if he has what it takes to risk everything and save his new friends.

== Cast ==
Actor	Role
Matt Dill	Paul
Sam Waterston	Ofoeti
Susan Anton	Kalotte
Nicolle Cherubini	Pretty Girl
David Crawford	Paul's Father
James A. DeVinney	Guard
Winnie Flynn	Paul's Mother
Paul Gertner	Olaf the Great
Arther Greenwald	Jogger
Larry Harris	Basketball Player
James Karen	Richman
Radar Long	Guard
Russ Martz	Computer Voice
William H. Macy (credited as W.H. Macy)	Socrates
Josh Mostel	Wiseman
David Roland; Radar Long; James A. DeVinney	Guards
Tom Savini	Motorcyclist
Richard B. Shull	Doorman/Narrator
Max Wright	Secretary
