= Over 21 =

1945 film by Charles Vidor

- Directed by: Charles Vidor
- Screenplay by: Sidney Buchman
- Based on: Over 21; 1944 play by Ruth Gordon
- Produced by: Sidney Buchman
- Starring: Irene Dunne; Alexander Knox; Charles Coburn
- Cinematography: Rudolph Maté
- Edited by: Otto Meyer
- Music by: Marlin Skiles
- Color process: Black and white
- Production company: Sidney Buchman Productions
- Distributed by: Columbia Pictures
- Release date: August 8, 1945
- Running time: 105 minutes
- Country: United States
- Language: English

Over 21 is a 1945 American comedy film directed by Charles Vidor and starring Irene Dunne, Alexander Knox and Charles Coburn.

== Plot ==
At the New York Bulletin newspaper, its owner, Robert Drexel Gow, receives a teletype story that the newspaper's thirty-nine-year-old editor, Max Wharton, is resigning to enlist in the army. Robert is livid, both at the news and the method that he found out about the news. There is a second story on the teletype: Max's wife, the famous novelist Paula Wharton (whom Max calls Paulie), is in Hollywood adapting her latest book into a movie screenplay. Max wants to do his duty as a citizen and responsible journalist to be close to the war (World War II). Robert's view is that without Max, the newspaper will fold because Max *is* the newspaper.

From Hollywood, Paulie telephones Max and congratulates him on his decision. After Max informs her of the plan of basic training then possibly officer's candidate school, Paulie decides that she will move to where ever that school is to be close to him.

After completion of basic training, Max sends Paulie a telegram that officer's candidate school is in Tetley Field, Florida. She doesn't quite understand Max's motivations, but she wants to see her husband succeed in this passion.

Paulie arrives at Palmetto Court looking for bungalow 26D and meets the last tenant, Jan Lupton, whose husband Roy has just graduated to second lieutenant. Jan gives Paulie the lowdown on life in 26D, and that life for the enlisted at Tetley Field is all work, work, work. Regarding school, Jan relays a story she heard where once you're over 21 years of age, your brain doesn't absorb the material taught anymore. Max comes by the bungalow surprised to see his wife there already. They have a loving reunion. The Luptons say goodbye to the Whartons, who can now have a proper reunion.

Max and Paulie discuss their upcoming life. Paulie wants to be just like all the other army wives living in the complex. With his difficulties in school, Max is concerned if he is doing the right thing for himself, for the country and for the newspaper. But his reason for doing this in the first place was to see the war first hand so that the newspaper could have someone with credible experience.

There is a frantic knock on the door. It is the Luptons. The train's been delayed and, after a few awkward moments, the Whartons offer the Luptons the bedroom for the night; Paulie will sleep on the sofa in the living room. The Lupton's return will delay the more passionate part of the Wharton's reunion until another time.

Robert, the publisher, calls wanting to speak to Max about the newspaper's future, the newspaper which he feels is falling apart. Robert is yelling and screaming how much he needs to make important decisions with Max's input. After Paulie in return yells back that Robert is not to disturb Max during this time (not mentioning Max's troubles in school), she abruptly hangs up on him.

Over the next several weeks, both Max and Paulie get ensconced in their new respective lives. Paulie is doing work foreign to her: housework. Max uses whatever free moment he has to cram more and more information into his brain, which he is still finding difficult to do.

After a field exercise, a tired Max hops into his bunk. He is approached by a fellow student named Paulson, a reporter with the base's newspaper, the Tetley Field Sentinel. He wants Max, as the most famous recruit on the base, to write a story about himself for the newspaper. Max is reluctant to do so if only for lack of time, but Paulson leaves him to consider the offer.

At the base, Max is called into Colonel Foley's office. The Colonel mentions that both his wife and mother-in-law are admirers of Mrs. Wharton and plan on dropping by the bungalow later that afternoon. Max is pleasantly surprised at the announcement, but surprised nonetheless as he is unaware of Mrs. Gates’ encounter with Paulie.

== Cast ==
- Irene Dunne as Paula "Polly" Wharton
- Alexander Knox as Max Wharton
- Charles Coburn as Robert Drexel Gow
- Jeff Donnell as Jan Lupton
- Loren Tindall as Lieutenant Roy Lupton
- Lee Patrick as Mrs. Foley
- Phil Brown as Frank MacDougal
- Cora Witherspoon as Mrs. Gates
- Charles Evans as Colonel Foley

== Reviews ==
The New York Times panned the performance of Irene Dunne, playing in the movie the role played by Ruth Gordon herself in the play, calling the production without Gordon "over-Dunne".
