= Over 21 (play) =

Over 21 is a play written by actress Ruth Gordon. This comedy ran 221 performances on Broadway in 1944, with Gordon in the starring role. This fast-paced comedy is set near Miami in 1943, where Max, a 39-year-old newspaper editor, is sweating out United States Army Air Corps training in competition with much younger recruits. Against his wishes, his novelist wife, Paula (played by Gordon in the original run), has joined him in Florida to encourage him and cheer him on. Max's old publisher, Robert Drexel Gow, visits to entice him to quit the service and return to work.

A movie version of the production was released in 1945 (Over 21). According to Turner Classic Movies, the story was loosely drawn from Gordon's own experiences, and has insightful things to say about men's and women's roles in society at that time.
