= John Wheatcroft =

American poet

- Born: July 24, 1925; Philadelphia, Pennsylvania, U.S.
- Died: March 14, 2017 (aged 91)
- Education: Temple University; Rutgers University; Bucknell University
- Occupations: Writer; educator

John Wheatcroft (July 24, 1925 – March 14, 2017) was an American writer and teacher.

A novelist, poet, and playwright, Wheatcroft's works have appeared in The New York Times and the Beloit Poetry Journal.

== Biography ==
Wheatcroft was born on July 24, 1925, in Philadelphia, Pennsylvania, and served in the United States Navy in World War II. Wheatcroft attended Temple University, Rutgers University, and Bucknell University, where he graduated in 1949.

He began teaching in Bucknell's English department in 1952, and founded and directed the Bucknell Seminar for Younger Poets in 1985 and was co-founder along with Jack Stadler and the first director of Bucknell's Stadler Center for Poetry. He also served as a juror for the 1996 Pulitzer Prize for Poetry. As professor emeritus after 1996, Wheatcroft continued to write and be published in his retirement.

Wheatcroft's significant writings include the play Ofoti, which was produced for NET Playhouse (now PBS) in 1966 starring René Auberjonois, and made into a film, The Boy Who Loved Trolls, in 1984. He wrote Catherine, Her Book, creating diary entries of Catherine Earnshaw from Wuthering Heights, which is cited in Patsy Stoneman's Brontë Transformations, and Christopher Heywood's version of Wuthering Heights. He is mentioned in the 1986 edition of Curt Johnson's Who's who in U.S. Writers, Editors & Poets. He also edited and participated in Our Other Voices: Nine Poets Speaking, a collection of interviews with poets such as Josephine Jacobsen and Wendell Berry.

== Death and interment ==
Wheatcroft died on March 14, 2017; his ashes were interred in Lewisburg, Pennsylvania.

== Bibliography ==
- Death of a Clown (1964)
- Prodigal Son (1967)
- Ofoti (1970) ISBN 0-498-07680-6
- Edie Tells: A Portrait of the Artist as a Middle-Aged Cleaning Woman (1975) ISBN 0-498-01605-6
- A Voice from the Hump and A Fourteenth-Century Poet's Vision of Christ (1977) ISBN 0-498-01909-8
- Ordering Demons (1981) ISBN 0-8453-4720-9
- Gowpen: A Double Handful of Poems with Karl Patten (1982, The Press of Appletree Alley limited edition)
- Declaring Generations with Peter Balakian (1982, The Press of Appletree Alley limited edition)
- Catherine, Her Book (1983) ISBN 0-8453-4742-X
- Slow Exposures (1986) ISBN 0-8453-4735-7
- The Beholder's Eye (1987) ISBN 0-8453-4724-1
- The Stare on the Donkey's Face (1990) ISBN 0-8453-4823-X
- Our Other Voices: Nine Poets Speaking (1991) ISBN 0-8387-5196-2
- Distances/Limited Edition (1991, The Press of Appletree Alley limited edition) ISBN 0-9163-7514-5
- Killer Swan (1992) ISBN 0-8453-4836-1
- Mother of All Loves (1994) ISBN 0-8453-4849-3
- Trio with Four Players (1995) ISBN 0-8453-4856-6
- Alfresco (1995, The Press of Appletree Alley chapbook)
- The Education of Malcolm Palmer (1997) ISBN 0-8453-4863-9
- Random Necessities (1999) ISBN 0-8453-4867-1
- Answering Fire (2006) ISBN 0-9765611-1-5
- The Fugitive Self (2009) ISBN 0-9797450-9-8
- Telling Tales (2010) ISBN 978-0-9797516-7-7
- The Portrait of a Lover (2011) ISBN 1-61879-000-5
- The Disappearance of Felix Kulp (2013) ISBN 978-1-4675-8077-9
- I AM? (2013) ISBN 978-1-4675-7104-3
