= Marguerite Viel =

French filmmaker (1894-1976)

Marguerite Viel (1894-1976) was a French filmmaker who was active during the late 1920s and 1930s. She wrote and directed several films, including Occupe-toi d’Amélie (1932) and La banque Nemo (1934). Viel was also a frequent collaborator of Jean Epstein, lending financial support to many of Epstein's films.

Viel worked as a dialogue writer and sound editor during the first years of sound film. As a sound editor, she was responsible for the French dubbing of non-French films.

== Filmography ==
=== As writer or director ===
| Title | Year | Role | Notes |
|---|---|---|---|
| La banque Nemo | 1934 | Director and screenwriter | |
| Une Petite bonne sérieuse (short film) | 1932 | Co-director with Richard Weishbach | |
| Occupe-toi d’Amélie (Take Care of Amelie) | 1932 | Co-director with Rene Weissbach | adapted from a play by Georges Feydeau |
| Terra farouche | 1930 | Director | |

=== In other roles ===
| Title | Year | Director | Role |
|---|---|---|---|
| Erotikon | 1929 | Gustav Machaty | Viel likely worked on the sound version of the film when it premiered in France |
| The Great Gabbo | 1929 | Erich von Stroheim | sound editor |
| Feind im Blut | 1931 | Walter Ruttmann | sound editor |
| Dzungle Velkomest/La Jungle d'une grande ville | 1930 | Leo Marten | artistic consultant |
| La Chute de la Maison Usher (The Fall of the House of Usher) | 1928 | Jean Epstein | investor |
