= Orange Blossoms (musical) =

Musical comedy

- Music: Victor Herbert
- Lyrics: Buddy DeSylva
- Book: Fred de Gresac
- Setting: Contemporary Paris and Cannes
- Basis: The Marriage of Kitty by Fred de Gresac
- Premiere: September 19, 1922: Fulton Theatre, Broadway

Orange Blossoms is a 1922 musical comedy with music by Victor Herbert, lyrics by Buddy DeSylva, and a book by Fred de Gresac, based on her own 1902 French play La Passerelle which had also been translated and staged on Broadway in 1903 as The Marriage of Kitty.

It ran for 95 performances at the Fulton Theatre on Broadway between September 19 and December 9, 1922. Produced and directed by Edward Royce, the cast included Alta King, Pat Somerset, Queenie Smith, Edith Day, Hal Skelly, Nancy Welford, and Jack Whiting. The setting is contemporary France with the action taking place in Paris and Cannes.

== Synopsis ==
Setting: Lawyer's Office, Paris and Kitty's Villa at Cannes.

Baron Roger Belmont's aunt has recently died, leaving him her inheritance if he marries within a year of her death. He is in love with Helene de Vasquez, but is unable to marry her as his aunt's will specifies he cannot marry a divorcee. His lawyer, Tillie Jones, suggests Belmont enter into a marriage of convenience with her niece Kitty, allowing him to receive his full inheritance before divorcing Kitty and marrying Helene. However, Belmont and Kitty do end up falling in love.

== Productions ==
Although the Broadway production closed after three months, unable to recoup its investment, the show went on to tour, first stopping for two weeks at the Colonial Theatre in Boston.

In 2014 the Light Opera of New York put on a revival of the show, with revised lyrics by Michael Phillips and Cynthia Edwards, and orchestra reconstructions by Brian Kerns and Christian Smythe, conducted by Evans Haille at the piano. The revised production had only two acts, instead of the original three.

The Victor Herbert Renaissance Project (VHRP) put on a production of the show in 2018, directed by Alyce Mott, with musical direction by Michael Thomas, William Hicks on piano, and choreography by Emily Cornelius.

== Cast ==
	1922 Broadway	2014 Light Opera	2018 VHRP
Lawyer Brassac	Pat Somerset	David Kelleher-Flight	David Seatter
Tillie Jones	Queenie Smith	Lisa Flanagan	Alexa Devlin
Octave	Maurice Darcy		
Roger Belmont	Robert Michaelis	Glenn Seven Allen	Bray Wilkins
Kitty Savary	Edith Day	Natalie Ballenger	Joanie Brittingham
Jimmy "J.J." Flynn	Hal Skelly	Ben Liebert	Drew Bolander
Helene de Vasquez	Phyllis Le Grand	Sarah Callinan	Sarah Caldwell Smith
Auguste	Robert Fischer		Jonathan Fox Powers
Ninetta	Nancy Welford	Sarah Best	Joanna Geffert
Bressac's clients	Evelyn Darville; Alta King; Dagmar Oakland; Emily Drange; Fay Evelyn; Diana Stegman; Eden Gray; Vera de Wolfe		Jenny Lindsey; Alexa Clint; Joanna Geffert; Elisabeth Slaten; Susan Case
Gentlemen in the case	Thomas Fitzpatrick; Frank Curran; Oliver Stewart; Denny Murray; Abner Barnhart; Jack Whiting; Gayle Mays; Clinton Merrill		Colm Fitzmaurice; Quintin Harris; Keith Broughton

== Musical numbers ==
=== Act l ===
- (Opening) – Lawyer Brassac, (Ladies)
- "This Time It's Love" – Roger Belmont
- "A Kiss in the Dark" – Kitty Savary
- "New York Is the Same Old Place" – J.J. Flynn, Tillie Jones
- "Then Comes the Dawning" – Roger Belmont, Helene de Vasquez
- "I Can't Argue With You" – Roger Belmont, Helene de Vasquez, Lawyer Brassac, (a Lady client)
- "In Hennequeville" – Kitty Savary
- "A Kiss in the Dark" (reprise) – Kitty Savary

=== Act ll ===
- "On the Riviera" – (Ladies and Gentlemen)
- "The Lonely Nest" – Kitty Savary
- "I Missed You" – Kitty Savary, Roger Belmont, Lawyer Brassac, Ninetta
- "Just Like That" – J.J. Flynn, Ninetta
- "Orange Blossoms" – Kitty Savary, (Gentlemen)

=== Act lll ===
- "Mosquito Ballet" – (Dancers)
- "Way Out West in Jersey" – J.J. Flynn, Tillie Jones
- "Let's Not Get Married" – (Ladies and Gentlemen)
- "This Time It's Love" (reprise) – Roger Belmont
- (Finale) – (Company)

== Reception ==
The original Broadway production was generally well-received, with positive reviews from the Brooklyn Daily Eagle, Brooklyn Life, the Los Angeles Times, the New York Evening World, the New York Herald, the New York Journal, the New York Telegraph, and the New York Times.
