= Afraid to Love =

1927 film by Edward H. Griffith

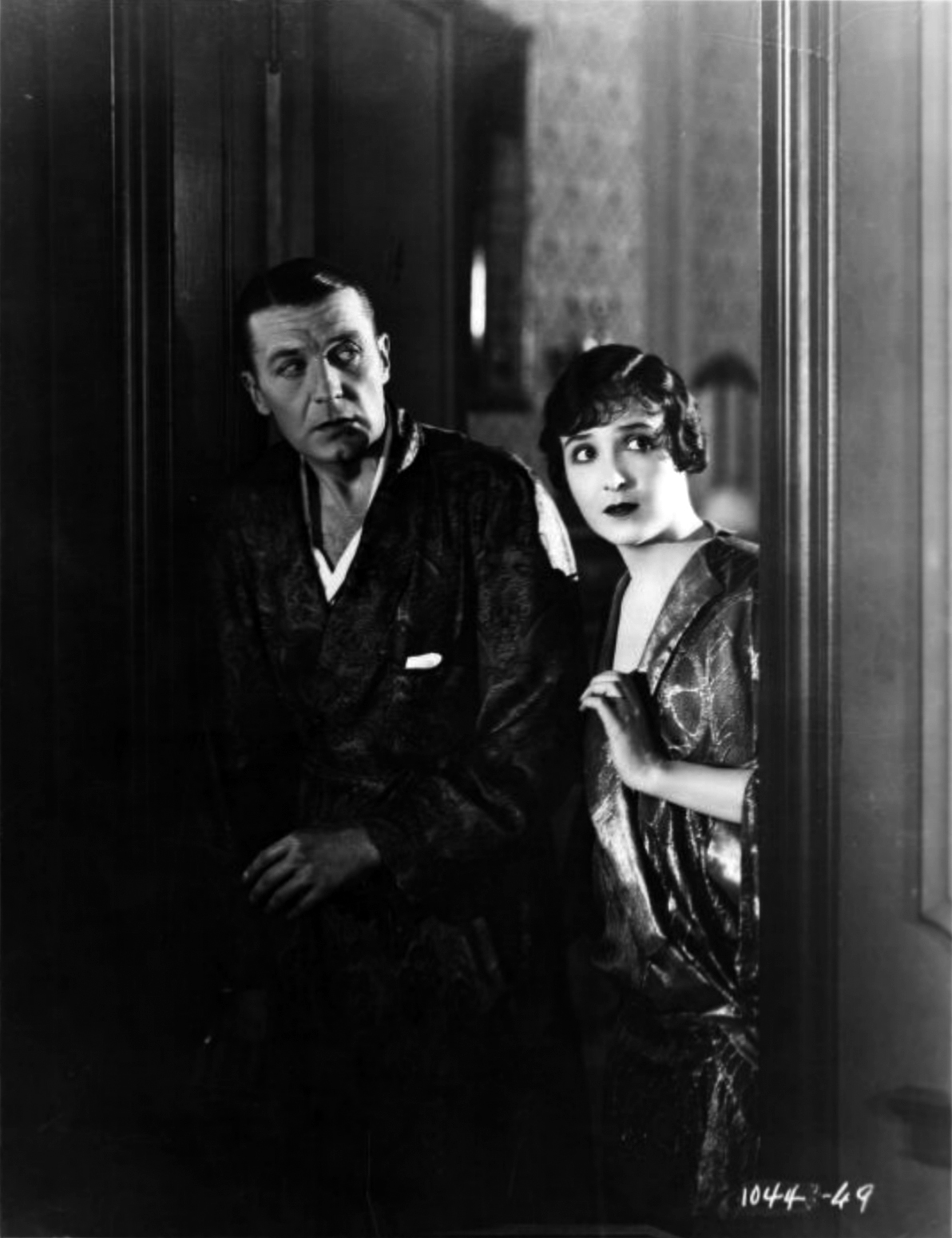
- Clive Brook and Florence Vidor
- Directed by: Edward H. Griffith
- Screenplay by: Doris Anderson; Alfred Hustwick; Joseph Jackson
- Based on: The Marriage of Kitty by Cosmo Gordon Lennox
- Produced by: B. P. Schulberg; Jesse L. Lasky; Adolph Zukor
- Starring: Florence Vidor; Clive Brook; Norman Trevor; Jocelyn Lee; Arthur Lubin
- Cinematography: J.O. Taylor
- Production company: Famous Players–Lasky Corporation
- Distributed by: Paramount Pictures
- Release date: April 9, 1927
- Running time: 70 minutes
- Country: United States
- Language: English

Afraid to Love is a lost 1927 American silent comedy film directed by Edward H. Griffith and written by Doris Anderson, Francis de Croisset, Fred de Gresac, Alfred Hustwick and Joseph Jackson. The film stars Florence Vidor, Clive Brook, Norman Trevor, Jocelyn Lee and Arthur Lubin. The film was released on April 9, 1927, by Paramount Pictures.

It is based on the 1902 play The Marriage of Kitty by Cosmo Gordon Lennox, a version of the French play La Passerelle by Francis de Croisset and Fred de Gresac. The play was previously adapted into the 1915 film The Marriage of Kitty.

== Synopsis ==
When Sir Reginald Belsize's uncle dies he leaves him a fortune on condition that he give up his current unsuitable lover Helen and marry someone else within twenty four hours. Helen agrees to this so long as the woman he picks is less attractive than she is. The woman he picks is however beautiful and cultured and he quickly falls in love with her.

== Cast ==
- Florence Vidor as Katherine Silverton
- Clive Brook as Sir Reginald Belsize
- Norman Trevor as John Travers
- Jocelyn Lee as Helen de Semiano
- Arthur Lubin as Rafael

== Preservation status ==
With no holdings located in archives, Afraid to Love is now considered a lost film.

== See also ==
- The Marriage of Kitty (1915)
