= The Marriage of Kitty =

1915 film by George Melford

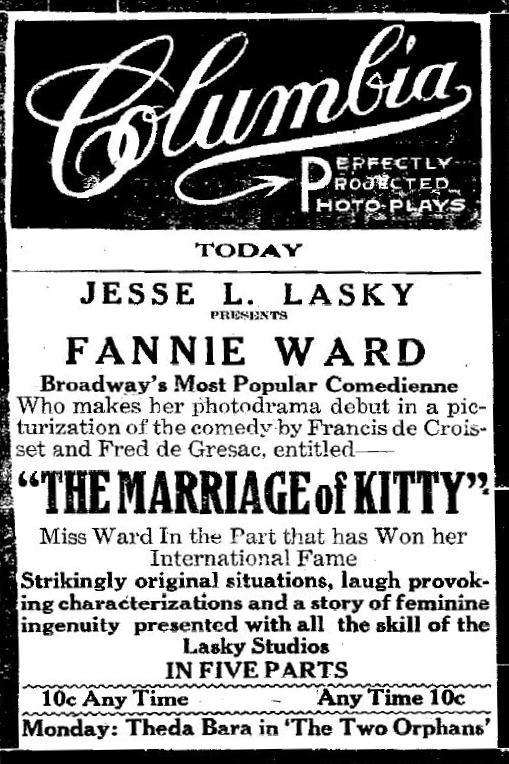
- September 1915 advertisement
- Directed by: George Melford
- Screenplay by: Hector Turnbull
- Based on: The Marriage of Kitty by Francis de Croisset, Fred de Gresac, and Cosmo Gordon Lennox
- Produced by: Jesse L. Lasky
- Starring: Fannie Ward; Richard Morris; Jack Dean; Cleo Ridgely; Tom Forman
- Production company: Jesse L. Lasky Feature Play Company
- Distributed by: Paramount Pictures
- Release date: August 16, 1915
- Running time: 5 reels
- Country: United States
- Language: Silent (English intertitles)

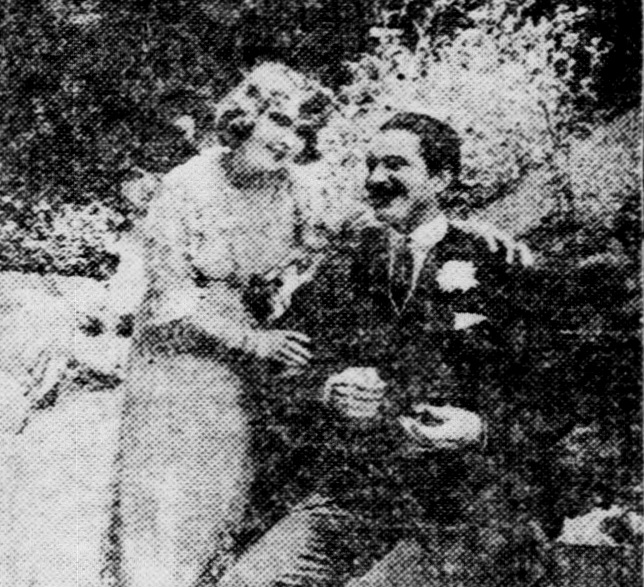
Scene from the film

The Marriage of Kitty is a lost 1915 American silent comedy film directed by George Melford.

It was written by Francis de Croisset, Fred de Gresac, Cosmo Gordon Lennox and Hector Turnbull. The origin of the work was de Croisset, who wrote the French play La Passerelle in 1902, and was soon adapted to English by Lennox as The Marriage of Kitty.

The film stars Fannie Ward, Richard Morris, Jack Dean, Cleo Ridgely, and Tom Forman. The film was released on August 16, 1915, by Paramount Pictures.

== Plot ==
The film depicts a young woman who agrees to a sham wedding with Lord Riginald Belsize because his inheritance prohibits him from marrying his girlfriend who is an actress. Belsize is convinced if he marries someone else and hires that woman to be his "wife" he can hide his relationship with his girlfriend. Eventually the young woman and the Lord fall in love even though that wasn't the original intention of either of them and she reveals that his girlfriend is a dangerous woman.

== Cast ==
- Fannie Ward as Katherine "Kitty" Silverton
- Richard Morris as John Travers
- Jack Dean as Lord Reginald Belsize
- Cleo Ridgely as Helen de Semiano
- Tom Forman as Jack Churchill
- Mrs. Lewis McCord as Annie
- Lucien Littlefield (Undetermined Role)
- Theodore Roberts (Undetermined Role)

== See also ==
- Afraid to Love (1927)
