= The Marquise =

Play by Noël Coward

Frank Cellier, Marie Tempest and W. Graham Brown in Act III, 1927

The Marquise is a romantic comedy play by Noël Coward, written as a vehicle for Marie Tempest, who starred in the original 1927 production in London. Later players of the central role have included Lillian Gish, Celia Johnson, Moira Lister, Diana Rigg and Kate O'Mara.

The play is set in 18th-century France and depicts the complications arising from the romantic affairs of two generations of an aristocratic family.

== Background ==
By 1926 Coward had written more than a dozen plays, two of them – The Vortex and Hay Fever – were big box-office successes, and he was in demand as a playwright. He had promised Marie Tempest to write a comedy for her, and completed The Marquise while recuperating from a breakdown in his health, brought on by overwork. He told his mother, "As there are several illegitimate children in it I doubt if Lord Cromer [the official censor] will care very deeply for it". The censor licensed the play, and it was put into rehearsal. Tempest wrote to Coward: "Your writing of the play is, to me, amazing. I cannot tell you how much I love it all!!"

Tempest co-starred with her husband, W. Graham Brown, who also directed. The play opened at the Criterion Theatre, London, on 16 February 1927 and ran for 129 performances, until 11 June.

== Roles and original cast ==
- Comte Raoul de Vriaac – W. Graham Brown
- Adrienne (his daughter) – Eileen Sharp
- Jacques Rijar (his secretary) – Robert Harris
- Esteban, El Duco de Santaguano – Frank Cellier
- Miguel (his son) – Godfrey Winn
- Father Clement – Colin Johnston
- Hubert (servant in the Château de Vriaac) – Rupert Lister
- The Marquise Eloise de Kestournel – Marie Tempest
- Alice (her maid) – Lilian Cavanagh

== Plot ==
The action takes place in the main living-room of the Château de Vriaac, near Paris, in the year 1735.

=== Act I ===
Count Raoul de Vriaac, once something of a rake, but now a solemn and reformed character, is giving a dinner to celebrate the betrothal of his daughter Adrienne to Miguel, the son of Esteban, Duke of Santaguano. Esteban was Raoul's boon companion in the days of their youthful indiscretions. Also present are Raoul's young secretary, Jacques Rijar, and confessor, Father Clement. Raoul toasts the young couple, urging them to live with "clarity of purpose and humility of spirit". Esteban thinks his old friend has become overserious, and his own advice to the couple is, "Enjoy yourselves as much as possible; it will pass the time pleasantly and lead you into old age with a few gay memories to cheer you". During Esteban's speech Jacques abruptly leaves the room. The young people go out on the terrace, and Father Clement says good night, leaving the two old friends together. Under the influence of his late wife and her confessor, Raoul has settled down into respectable dullness, and he is uncomfortable when Esteban reminisces about their misspent youth. Raoul admits to one real love-affair, about which Esteban never knew, but before he can say more Miguel and Adrienne return. The older men go into the library. Adrienne is not in high spirits: she tells Miguel that he does not really love her. He admits it: he is in love with a dancer in Paris. She confides that she is in love with her father's secretary. Miguel promises to help her, and when Jacques comes in he leaves them together. They embrace passionately but briefly before Esteban comes back with Raoul, to take his leave.

When Adrienne has gone to bed, Raoul reproves Jacques for leaving the table during the Duke's speech. Jacques answers his employer recklessly, accusing him of being "Afraid – of youth – afraid of life – afraid of suffering – afraid of happiness". Raoul angrily replies that Jacques has taken leave of his senses, and tells him to go to bed.

Raoul remains, gazing at a portrait of his late wife, until he is startled by a tapping at the terrace window. He opens it, and the Marquise de Kestournel steps in, exquisitely dressed for travelling. She is the woman with whom he had his one genuine love affair in his youth, and he had believed her to be dead. After a brief exchange about minor matters, she asks, "Where is my child?" He replies that her child is dead – "as far as you are concerned." Adrienne, he says, believes that his wife was her mother. He asks Eloise why she has sprung this surprise on him. Saying she has come back for good, she shows him a letter he wrote to her at the time of their parting, in which he said that, if ever she felt weary and alone, he would always be waiting for her. He replies that his wife changed him completely: he has repented of his loose living and now has faith and peace and nobility of purpose. Eloise walks out. He calls after her, but she has gone. He unlocks a cabinet and takes out a box containing a packet of Eloise's letters, trinkets and other mementos. He smashes it open and flings the contents into the fire. Roused by the noise, Adrienne comes down. Her father sharply orders her to go back to bed; she refuses, saying firmly that she wants to talk to him: she will not marry Miguel because she loves Jacques Rijar. Having declared that Jacques will be dismissed, the Count appeals to her in the name of her "dear dead mother". Adrienne says furiously that her mother cared nothing for either of them. "She only loved herself and God and Father Clement". She adds that Raoul's life is a pretence – he does not love her, or he would not force her to marry against her will. So adds that he can send her to a convent but she will not marry Miguel. As she sobs the front door bell clangs, and the servant Hubert ushers in "Madame la Marquise de Kestournel". Eloise, followed by her maid Alice, stands in the doorway. She greets Raoul formally as though a stranger, explaining that her coach has lost a wheel and she is obliged to ask hospitality for the night. Raoul refuses it, saying there is no room, but his daughter (encouraged by Hubert, who has recognised the Marquise) insists that she shall stay.

=== Act II ===
The next morning Miguel calls, in response to a note from Adrienne, who is distraught because her father is dismissing Jacques. Miguel consoles her, promising to seek his father's help, and goes to find Esteban. Jacques is dejected, believing it his duty to renounce Adrienne; she begs him not to go away immediately. As they go out to the terrace, Eloise enters. She exchanges a few words with Hubert, who is pleased to see her back, and tells her that both the Count and his daughter are in need of cheering up. Father Clement brings a message from Raoul, regretting that a headache will prevent him from saying goodbye to her before she leaves; she ignores the hint. Adrienne re-enters. Eloise has taken an immediate liking to her, and a candid exchange follows in which Adrienne tells Eloise about her difficulties. She slips off as her father appears. He is in a bad temper and bids Eloise go at once, repeating that she is sinful and shall not enter his life again; she can go back to her own house. She replies that her house is sold, so sure was she that he would welcome her with open arms, and honour his old promise. She hands him a document, which he throws into the fire thinking it is his letter; she then tells him she has given him her dressmaker's bill by mistake. He leaves the room in a fury. As Jacques comes downstairs, dressed for travelling and carrying a large bag, Eloise stops him, tells him to stay, and promises that she will find him work and help him win Adrienne. He goes back upstairs just as Esteban is announced. At the sight of each other, Esteban and Eloise are astonished. They fall into each other's arms, and she asks him for news of her child, François. Esteban explains that the boy was re-named Miguel, and realising that this is Adrienne's fiancé, Eloise goes into gales of hysterical laughter. It becomes clear (although not yet to Esteban) that she had had affairs with Esteban and later Raoul with neither man knowing about the other, and that Miguel and Adrienne are half-brother and -sister. Unlike Raoul, Esteban is warmly disposed to his former lover, and they vow to be good friends. Having recovered his temper, Raoul comes to say that he is taking Adrienne away to Paris; meanwhile, his house is at the service of Madame la Marquise. Esteban invites Eloise to have supper with him, and leaves. After a last appeal to Raoul not to make Adrienne marry Miguel, Eloise takes matters into her own hands. She sends for Father Clement, and at pistol point forces him to marry Adrienne to Jacques; Raoul furiously bangs in vain at the locked door.

=== Act III ===
Later the same day Raoul is seated alone at supper. He sends for Hubert, calls for cognac, and drinks copiously. When Esteban comes to take Eloise to supper, he is surprised to find Raoul still in residence, and taken aback when his staid friend professes a longing for Paris, the city of sin: "Vivid, scarlet sin – it warms one up, you know". Hubert tells Esteban that the Marquise and Father Clement have both left, and Adrienne has married Jacques and gone to Paris with him. Not entirely sober, Raoul addresses his wife's portrait, saying that he forgives her for being "a determined and unmitigated bore". He drinks black coffee to clear his head, and he confirms Hubert's account of the morning's events. Esteban and Raoul compare notes and discover that Eloise has had an affair, and a child, with each. The two men drink to her damnation. As they do so, she quietly enters from the terrace, where she has been listening. Both men accuse her of having deceived and betrayed them. She responds that she is expecting one or the other to marry her. Raoul loses his temper, accuses Esteban of being a traitor and a hypocrite, and slaps his face. This leads to a duel; Raoul sends Hubert to fetch a rapier, the furniture is pushed back, and Esteban draws his sword. Eloise sits at the side on a spinet, eating an orange and urging the combatants on ("Really, considering your joint ages, you're doing magnificently!"). When she decides they have fought enough, she throws an embroidered cloth over their blades and commands them to stop. Esteban is still angry, but she tells him that if he slaps Raoul's face it will be a quid pro quo and honour will be satisfied. He does so, lightly, and bursts out laughing. The two men embrace. Having reconciled them, Eloise reveals that she has never been married – they were the only two men in her life, and for the past sixteen years she has lived an entirely virtuous existence – "in this depraved age it's rather humiliating to admit it" – earning a successful living as a singer. Her reason for leaving Esteban was to prevent his family from disinheriting him and ruining his career; she left Raoul because he never once suggested marriage to her. Esteban chivalrously offers her his hand; Eloise makes no immediate reply, and Raoul suddenly exclaims that he loves her. He walks out to the terrace. Esteban is plainly relieved that her choice will fall on Raoul. She kisses him good night, and he leaves them. Eloise sits down at the spinet and begins to play, as Raoul comes in again. He tells her, "I mean what I said. I do love you", and she replies that it has "been obvious since the first moment I came into the house". He rests his head on her shoulder as the curtain falls.

== Critical reception ==
The theatre critic of The Morning Post called the play "a very amusing and well-constructed piece … the first of Mr. Coward's plays to have a good first act". His only complaint about the piece was the love scene between Adrienne and Jacques: "Mr Coward still cannot write an effective love scene; his imagination is defeated when he cannot be flippant about the mating of true lovers. In time, no doubt, his innate sincerity will enable him to conquer such scenes, but that time is not yet, and I am obliged frankly to say that what should have been a fragrant interlude was tiresomely banal". He found the rest of the play "delicious and done with dexterity and delicacy". In The Manchester Guardian, Ivor Brown thought the play a "dried and brittle little piece", made successful chiefly by Marie Tempest's "genius". The Daily Telegraph found the play "flaming and theatrical and deft in the extreme … written with a sense of style". The Daily Mail thought "Mr Noel Coward has done far, far better things than this", and thought the best thing about the play was that "Miss Tempest is given such ample opportunities to exploit her delectable personality". The Times thought the third act weak, finding that after the climax of the second act, with the marriage at pistol-point, the duel and reconciliations of Act III did not engage the attention. Punch also praised the first two acts but found the last act weak.

Much of this criticism was echoed by Coward. He had not been able to attend rehearsals and saw the piece for the first time on the second night of the run; he later wrote:

It was for me obviously an enchanting evening, and it has made me forever incapable of judging the play on its merits. If, with intense concentration, I could detach myself for a moment from Marie Tempest's personality and performance, I might perhaps see what a tenuous, frivolous little piece The Marquise is. I might, if only I could forget her in the last act eating an orange and watching Raoul and Esteban fighting a duel, realise how weak and meretricious the last act is. I might, bereft of her memory, read with disdain the whole play; sneer at its flippancy; laugh at its trivial love scenes and shudder at the impertinence of an author who, for no apparent reason except perhaps that pictorially the period is attractive, elects to place a brittle modern comedy in an eighteenth-century setting. But I am not and never shall be bereft of the memory of Marie Tempest.

== Revivals and adaptations ==
In the US in the 1940s Lillian Gish played Eloise in an out-of-town production, which she wanted to bring into New York, but was prevented from doing so by a veto from Coward, for reasons that are not recorded. Mabel Albertson played Eloise opposite George Reeves as Raoul in the 1946 Playbox production in Pasadena, California. A British touring production in 2004 starred Kate O'Mara, Michael Jayston and Denis Lill.

The BBC broadcast the play in December 1969 as part of the celebrations of Coward's seventieth birthday. Celia Johnson played Eloise, with Richard Vernon as Raoul and Philip Latham as Esteban. The BBC transmitted a radio adaptation the following year, with Moira Lister as Eloise, Peter Pratt as Raoul and Richard Hurndall as Esteban. A television adaptation was broadcast in 1980, with Diana Rigg as Eloise, Richard Johnson as Raoul, James Villiers as Esteban and Daniel Chatto as Miguel.

== References and sources ==
=== Sources ===
- Coward, Noël (1982). "The Marquise". Plays: Two. London: Methuen. ISBN 978-0-413-46080-6.
- Day, Barry, ed. (2007). The Letters of Noël Coward. London: Methuen. ISBN 978-1-4081-0675-4.
- Hoare, Philip (1995). Noël Coward, A Biography. London: Sinclair-Stevenson. ISBN 978-1-4081-0675-4.
- Mander, Raymond; Joe Mitchenson (1957). Theatrical Companion to Coward. London: Rockliff. OCLC 470106222.
