= Elizabeth Meehan =

British screenwriter (1894–1967)

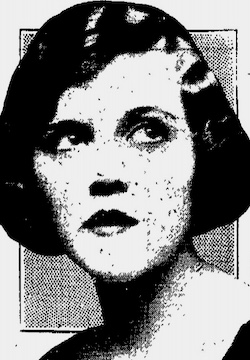
- Elizabeth Meehan, from a 1928 publication.
- Born: 22 August 1894; Isle of Wight, United Kingdom
- Died: 24 April 1967 (aged 72); New York City, United States
- Other names: Betty Meehan, Betty Williams, Elizabeth Meehan Williams
- Occupation: Screenwriter

Elizabeth Meehan (22 August 1894 – 24 April 1967) was a British screenwriter who worked in both Britain and Hollywood.

== Early life ==
Meehan was born on the Isle of Wight, and lived in Philadelphia, Pennsylvania.

== Career ==
As a young woman, Betty Meehan was a model, a professional swimmer, and a chorus girl with the Ziegfeld Follies, in the same sextet of dancers as Billie Dove and Alta King. "Oh yes, I know that chorines have the reputation of being beautiful but dumb," she explained in a 1928 interview, "And, perhaps, some of them are. But you'd be surprised at the girls you'll find in the choruses."

Meehan credited James M. Barrie with helping her transition into screenwriting. During the late 1930s Meehan was employed by the studio head Walter C. Mycroft to work for British International Pictures. Meehan frequently collaborated with the Irish director Herbert Brenon.

Later in her career, Meehan worked in television, writing episodes of Lux Video Theatre, Fireside Theatre, and Mama.

== Personal life ==
Meehan had a daughter, Frances Meehan Williams (1930-2006), who became an actress and later a psychotherapist. Elizabeth Meehan died in 1967, in New York, aged 72 years. Her daughter donated some of her original scripts and screenplays to the Special Collections library at UCLA.

== Selected filmography ==
- The Great Gatsby (1926)
- God Gave Me Twenty Cents (1926)
- Sorrell and Son (1927)
- The Telephone Girl (1927)
- Laugh, Clown, Laugh (1928)
- The Rescue (1929)
- The Case of Sergeant Grischa (1930)
- Lummox (1930)
- Beau Ideal (1931)
- Oliver Twist (1933)
- West of Singapore (1933)
- Harmony Lane (1935)
- Spring Handicap (1937)
- Over She Goes (1938)
- Star of the Circus (1938)
- Housemaster (1938)
- A Gentleman's Gentleman (1939)
- Parachute Nurse (1942)
- Storm Over Lisbon (1944)
- Northwest Outpost (1947)

== Bibliography ==
- Harper, Sue. Women in British Cinema: Mad, Bad and Dangerous to Know. Continuum International, 2000.
- Low, Rachael. History of the British Film: Filmmaking in 1930s Britain. George Allen & Unwin, 1985.
