= Fred de Gresac =

French librettist, playwright, and screenwriter

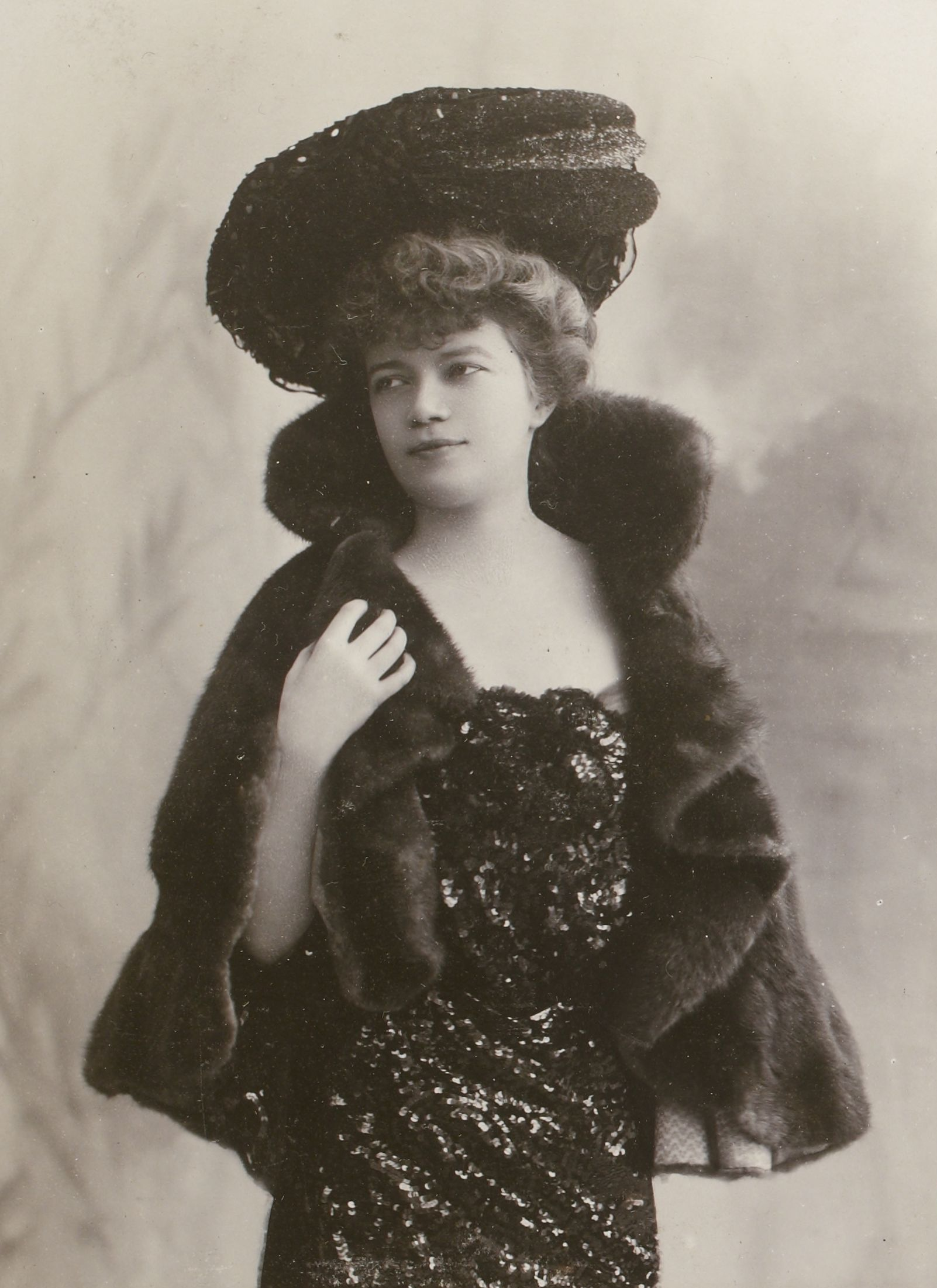
Fred de Gresac by Jean Reutlinger

Fred de Gresac (died February 20, 1943), born Frédérique Rosine de Grésac, was a French librettist, playwright and screenwriter. She was the wife of opera singer Victor Maurel.

== Early life ==
Frédérique Rosine de Grésac was born at Lamalou-les-Bains, in the south of France. (Dates of her birth range in sources, from 1866 to 1879.) She used the name "Fred de Gresac" professionally because, as she explained to a newspaper reporter, "I rather think the public likes its plays written by men."

== Career ==
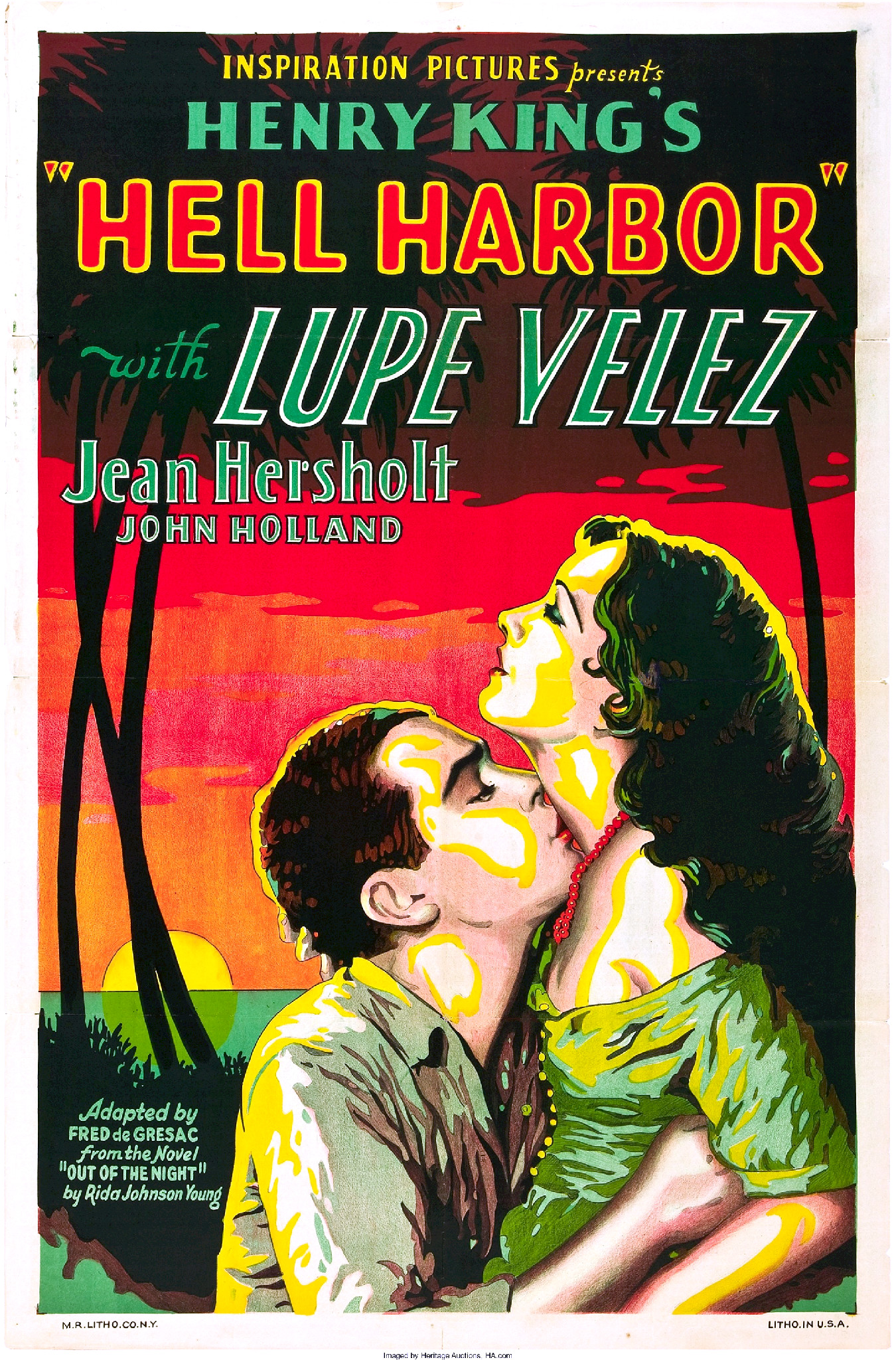
Movie poster for Hell Harbor (1930), crediting Fred de Gresac as writer of the adapted screenplay

In 1917, theatre critic Alan Dale wrote that "The most brilliant feminine playwright I have ever met is the lady who signs herself 'Fred de Gresac'." She wrote more than 100 plays and screenplays, including The Marriage of Kitty (1903-1904), La Passerelle (Orange Blossoms) (1904, revived in 1922 as a musical and 1947; with Victor Herbert), The Enchantress (1911-1912, with Harry B. Smith), The Wedding Trip (1911-1912, with Harry B. Smith and Reginald de Koven), The Purple Road (1913), Sweethearts (1913-1914, with Harry B. Smith), and Flo-Flo (1917-1918, with Silvio Hein and E. Paulton). Of the musical comedy Flo-Flo, she explained in 1919, "There is enough tragedy outside the theater. And so I have created Flo-Flo – I call her my spiritual cocktail – for America."

Films written by de Gresac included The Marriage of Kitty (1915, now lost), The Kiss of Hate (1916, now lost), The Great Secret (1917, now lost), The Eternal Temptress (1917), La Bohème (1926), The Son of the Sheik (1926), Afraid to Love (1927), Camille (1926), Breakfast at Sunrise (1927), She Goes to War (1929), and Hell Harbor (1930).

In 1909 she was named artistic director of the Little Theatre in New York, offering "Elaborate and Costly Amusement in a Luxurious Setting for the Elect."

== Personal life ==
Fred de Gresac was married to opera singer Victor Maurel. She was widowed when he died in 1923. Fred de Gresac died in Los Angeles in 1943, probably in her eighties. Her papers are archived at Stanford University.
