= The Marriage of Kitty (play) =

1902 play

- Original language: English
- Written by: Cosmo Gordon Lennox
- Genre: Comedy
- Setting: Lincoln's Inn Fields and Lake Geneva

Premiere
- Date: 19 August 1902
- Place: Duke of York's Theatre, London

The Marriage of Kitty is a 1902 comedy play by Cosmo Gordon Lennox. It is an English-language adaptation of the French play La Passerelle by Francis de Croisset and Fred de Gresac which premiered in Paris the same year.

It ran for 293 performances on its initial run in London's West End, first at the Duke of York's Theatre before moving to Wyndham's and then to the Criterion Theatre. The original cast included Marie Tempest, Leonard Boyne, Gilbert Hare and Ellis Jeffreys. A Broadway production at the Hudson Theatre ran for 51 performances in 1903.

== Film adaptations ==
The play was made into a 1915 silent film of the same title directed by George Melford and starring Fannie Ward. A second adaptation Afraid to Love was produced in 1927, directed by Edward H. Griffith and starring Florence Vidor and Clive Brook.
