= Camille (1927 film) =

1927 film

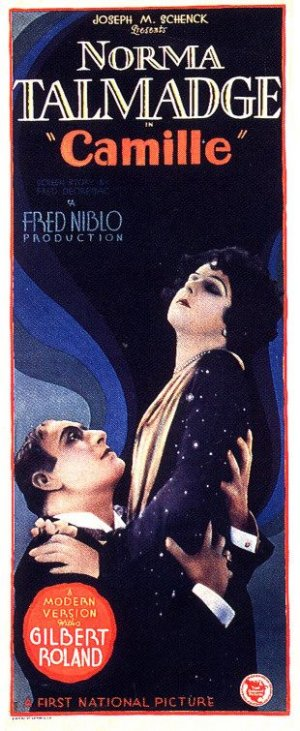
- Lobby poster
- Directed by: Fred Niblo
- Written by: Fred de Gresac (adaptation); Olga Printzlau (scenario); Chandler Sprague (scenario); George Marion, Jr. (intertitles)
- Based on: La Dame aux Camélias; 1848 novel by Alexandre Dumas, fils
- Produced by: Norma Talmadge; Joseph Schenck
- Starring: Norma Talmadge; Gilbert Roland; Lilyan Tashman
- Cinematography: Oliver Marsh
- Music by: William Axt; David Mendoza; Major Edward Bowes
- Distributed by: First National Pictures
- Release date: April 21, 1927
- Running time: 108 minutes
- Country: United States
- Languages: Silent; English intertitles

Camille is a 1927 American silent film based on the play adaptation of La Dame aux Camélias (The Lady of the Camellias) by Alexandre Dumas, fils, first published in French as a novel in 1848 and as a play in 1852. Adapted by Fred de Gresac, George Marion Jr., Olga Printzlau, and Chandler Sprague, Camille was a directed by Fred Niblo, and starred Norma Talmadge as Camille, and Gilbert Roland as her lover, Armand. It was produced by the Norma Talmadge Film Corporation and released by First National Pictures. The film's score was composed by William Axt.

== Cast ==
- Norma Talmadge – Marguerite Gautier, Camille
- Gilbert Roland – Armand
- Lilyan Tashman – Olympe
- Rose Dione – Prudence
- Oscar Beregi Sr. – Count de Varville
- Harvey Clark – the Baron
- Helen Jerome Eddy – Camille's maid
- Alec B. Francis – the Duke
- Albert Conti – Henri
- Michael Visaroff – Camille's father
- Evelyn Selbie – Camille's mother
- Etta Lee – Mataloti
- Maurice Costello – Armand's father

== Preservation status ==
An incomplete 35mm positive print exists in the Raymond Rohauer collection of the Cohen Media Group, according to Silent Era.
