= Barnesville, Minnesota =

City in Minnesota, United States

- City
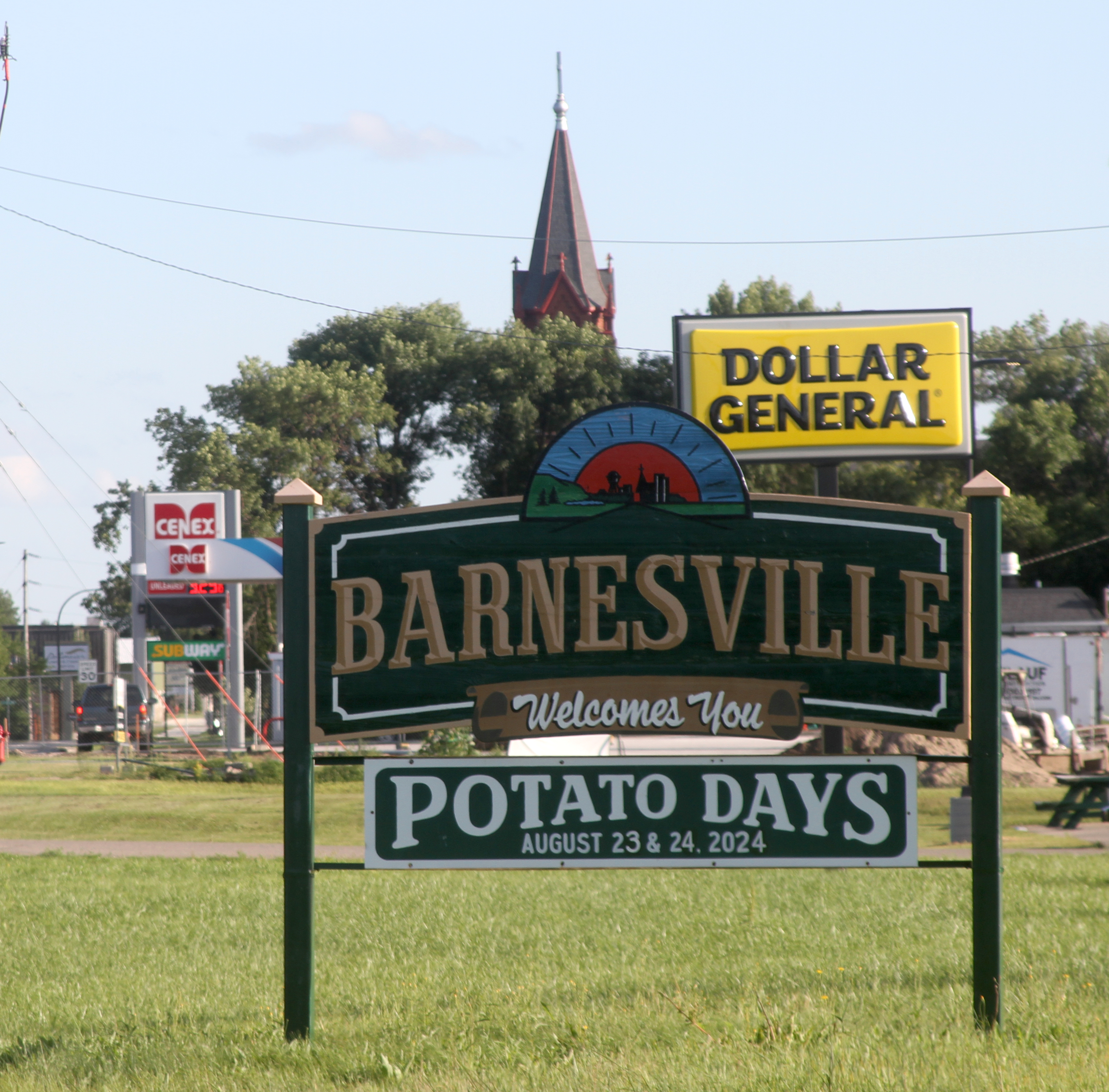
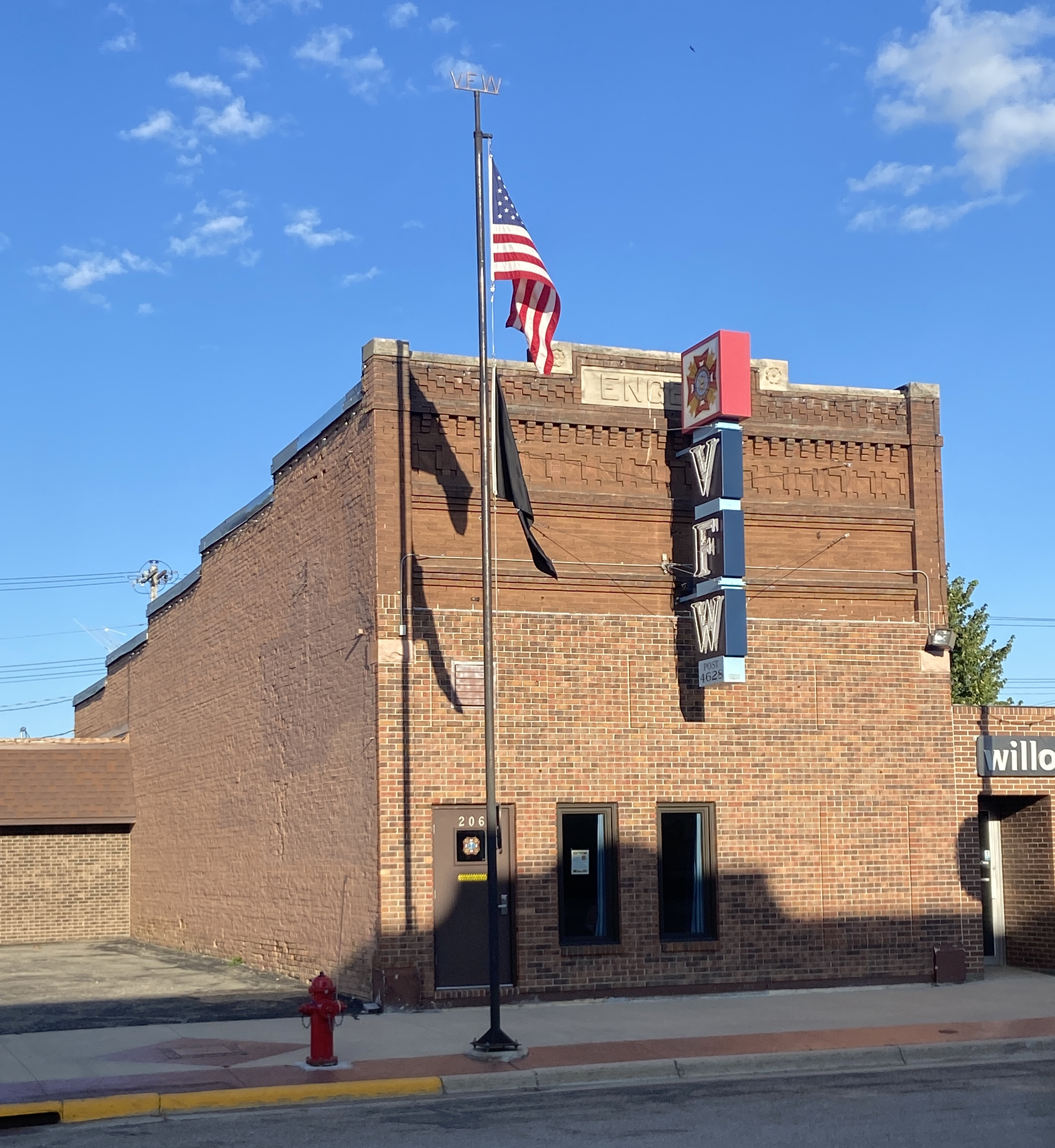
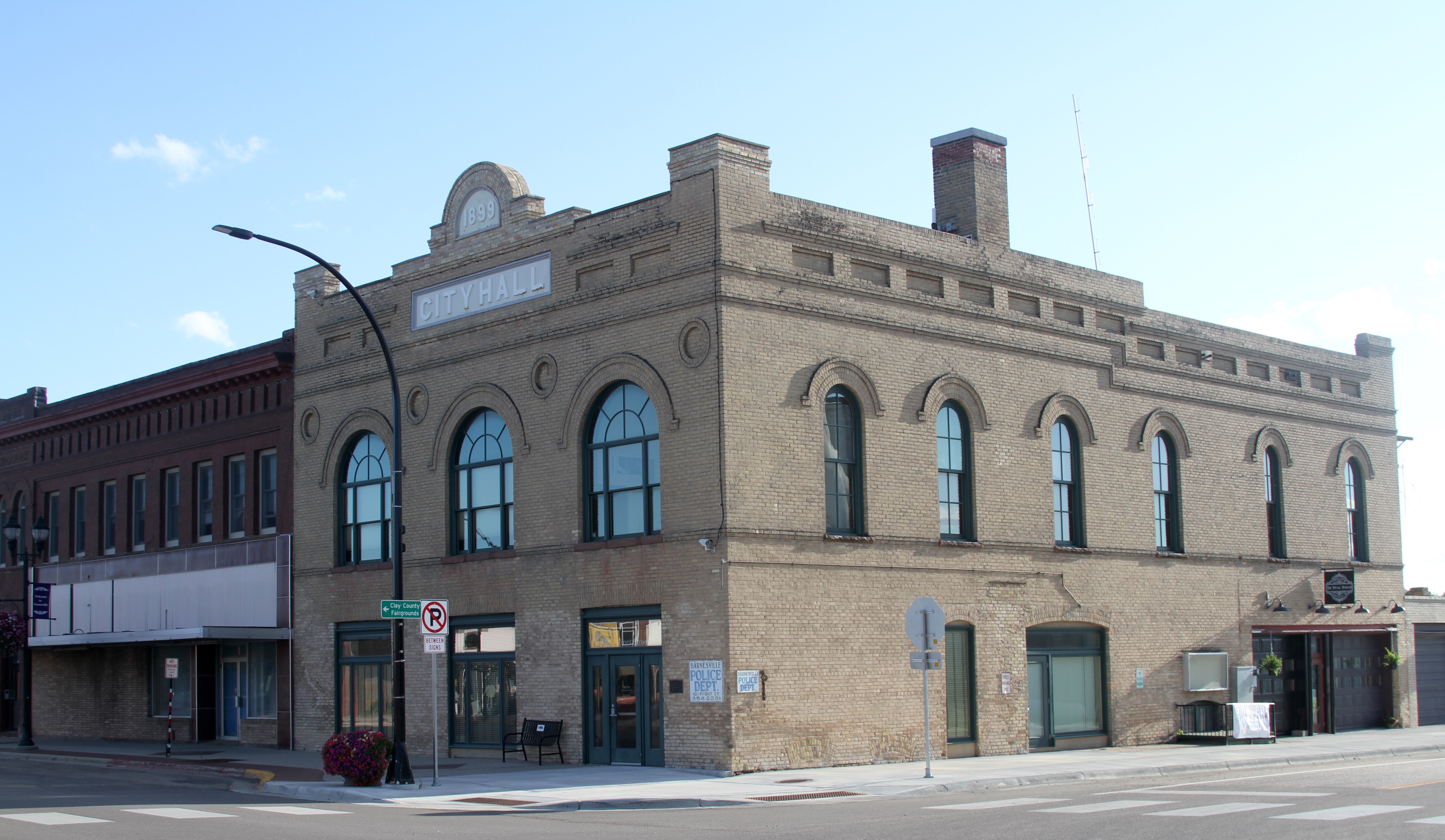
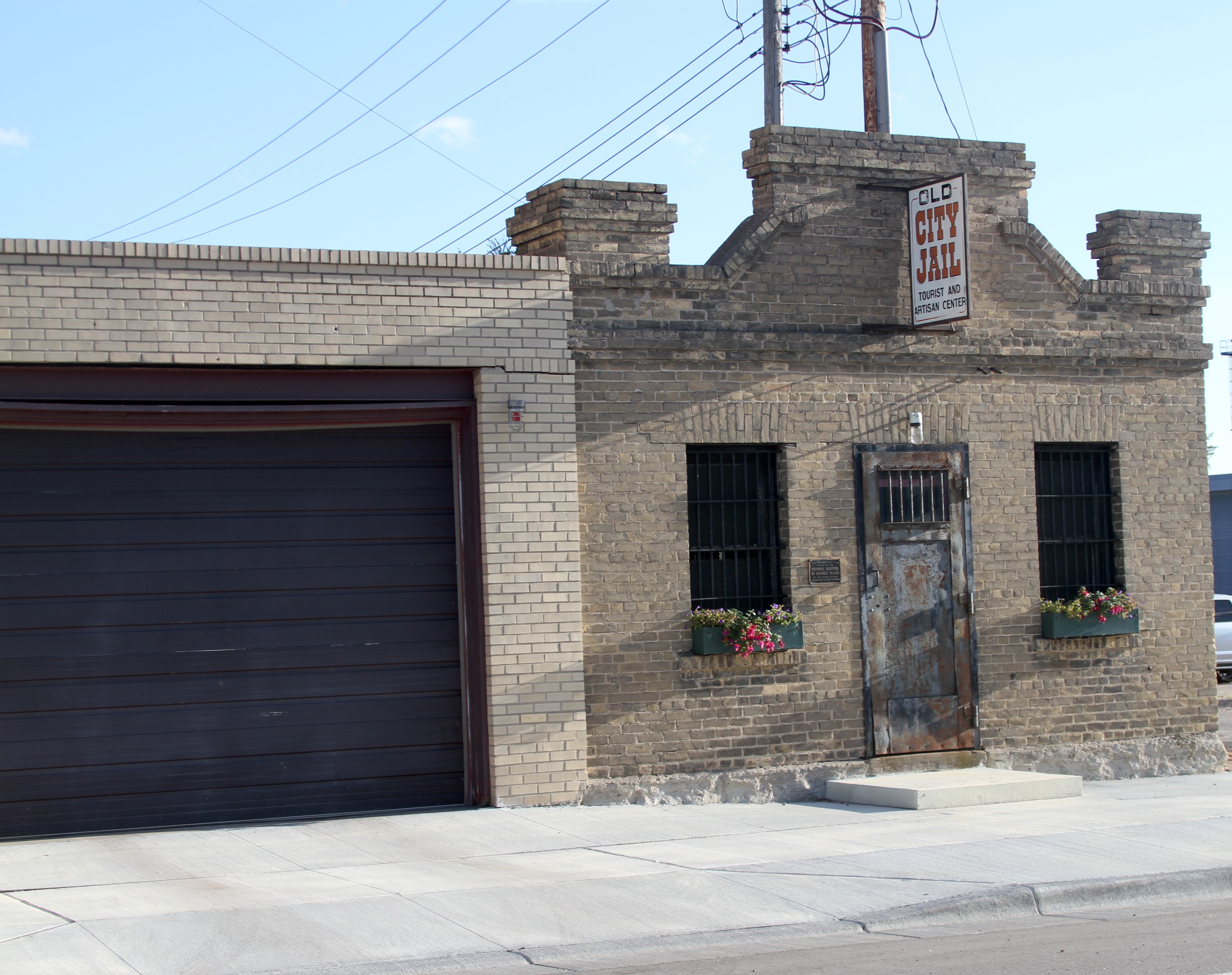
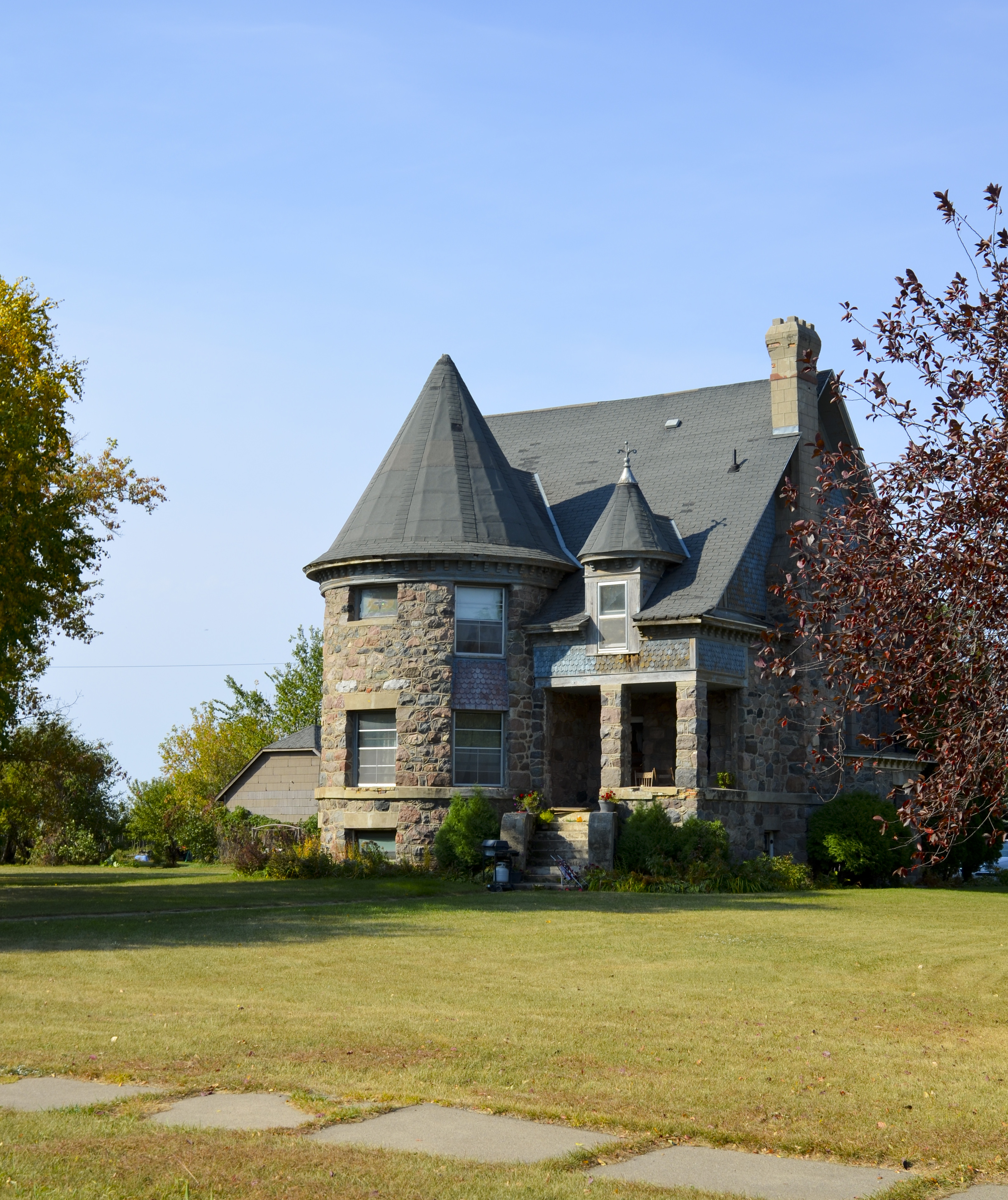
- Welcome sign, Barnesville, Minnesota VFW in Barnesville Old City Hall Old City Jail Patterson-Hernandez House
- Interactive map of Barnesville, Minnesota
- Location within Minnesota Location within the United States
- Coordinates: 46.6508°N 96.4151°W
- Country: United States
- State: Minnesota
- County: Clay
- Founded: 1874
- Incorporated (village): November 4, 1881
- Incorporated (city): April 4, 1889
- Founded by: George S. Barnes

Government
  - Type: Mayor–council
  - Mayor: Jason Rick
  - City manager: Jeremy Cossette
  - Councilmembers: Ward 1: Randy McEvers & Scott Bauer; Ward 2: Don Goedtke & Alyssa Bergman; Ward 3: Brad Field & Tonya Stokka

Area
  - Total: 2.019 sq mi (5.229 km^{2})
  - Land: 2.001 sq mi (5.183 km^{2})
  - Water: 0.017 sq mi (0.045 km^{2}) 0.89%
- Elevation: 1,030 ft (314 m)

Population (2020)
  - Total: 2,759
  - Estimate (2024): 2,765
  - Density: 1,379/sq mi (532.3/km^{2})
- Time zone: UTC−6 (Central (CST))
  - Summer (DST): UTC−5 (CDT)
- ZIP Code: 56514
- Area code: 218
- FIPS code: 27-03574
- GNIS feature ID: 2394065
- Highways: I-94/US 52, MN 9, MN 34
- Website: barnesvillemn.com

Barnesville is a city in Clay County, Minnesota, United States. The population was 2,759 at the 2020 census, and was estimated at 2,765 in 2024. It is part of the Fargo–Moorhead metropolitan area.

== History ==
Barnesville was founded in 1874 by George S. Barnes and named for him. A post office called Barnesville has been in operation since 1877. Barnesville was incorporated as a city in 1889.

== Geography ==
According to the United States Census Bureau, the city has a total area of 2.019 square miles (5.23 km^{2}), of which 2.001 square miles (5.18 km^{2}) is land and 0.018 square miles (0.047 km^{2}) (0.89%) is water.

== Demographics ==
Historical population
Census	Pop.	Note	%±
1890	1,063		—
1900	1,326		24.7%
1910	1,353		2.0%
1920	1,564		15.6%
1930	1,279		−18.2%
1940	1,450		13.4%
1950	1,593		9.9%
1960	1,632		2.4%
1970	1,782		9.2%
1980	2,207		23.8%
1990	2,066		−6.4%
2000	2,173		5.2%
2010	2,563		17.9%
2020	2,759		7.6%
2024 (est.)	2,765		0.2%
U.S. Decennial Census; 2020 Census

=== Racial and ethnic composition ===
Barnesville, Minnesota – racial and ethnic composition Note: the US Census treats Hispanic/Latino as an ethnic category. This table excludes Latinos from the racial categories and assigns them to a separate category. Hispanics/Latinos may be of any race.
Race / ethnicity (NH = non-Hispanic)
Race / ethnicity (NH = non-Hispanic)	Population 1990		Population 2000		Population 2010		Population 2020	
Race / ethnicity (NH = non-Hispanic)	Number	Percent	Number	Percent	Number	Percent	Number	Percent
White alone (NH)	2,055	99.47%	2,149	98.90%	2,512	98.01%	2,584	93.66%
Black or African American alone (NH)	2	0.10%	0	0.00%	4	0.16%	5	0.18%
Native American or Alaska Native alone (NH)	2	0.10%	5	0.23%	6	0.23%	9	0.33%
Asian alone (NH)	1	0.05%	3	0.14%	5	0.20%	8	0.29%
Pacific Islander alone (NH)	—	—	0	0.00%	2	0.08%	2	0.07%
Other race alone (NH)	0	0.00%	0	0.00%	0	0.00%	1	0.04%
Mixed race or multiracial (NH)	—	—	1	0.05%	16	0.62%	102	3.70%
Hispanic or Latino (any race)	6	0.29%	15	0.69%	18	0.70%	48	1.74%
Total	2,066	100.00%	2,173	100.00%	2,563	100.00%	2,759	100.00%

=== 2020 census ===
As of the 2020 census, there were 2,759 people, 1,057 households, and 719 families residing in the city. The median age was 36.5 years. 28.9% of residents were under the age of 18 and 15.7% were 65 years of age or older. For every 100 females, there were 95.8 males, and for every 100 females age 18 and over, there were 94.9 males age 18 and over.

The population density was 1,332.21 inhabitants per square mile (514.4/km^{2}). There were 1,124 housing units at an average density of 542.73 per square mile (209.5/km^{2}). Of housing units, 6.0% were vacant. The homeowner vacancy rate was 1.5% and the rental vacancy rate was 12.2%.

0.0% of residents lived in urban areas, while 100.0% lived in rural areas.

There were 1,057 households, of which 37.7% had children under the age of 18 living in them. Of all households, 57.2% were married-couple households, 16.4% were households with a male householder and no spouse or partner present, and 21.2% were households with a female householder and no spouse or partner present. About 28.1% of all households were made up of individuals, and 13.8% had someone living alone who was 65 years of age or older.

=== Demographic estimates ===
According to realtor website Zillow, the average price of a home as of February 28, 2026, in Barnesville is $298,751.

As of the 2024 American Community Survey, there are 1,005 estimated households in Barnesville with an average of 2.70 persons per household. The city has a median household income of $97,917. Approximately 1.8% of the city's population lives at or below the poverty line. Barnesville has an estimated 71.9% employment rate, with 30.7% of the population holding a bachelor's degree or higher and 96.6% holding a high school diploma. There were 1,082 housing units at an average density of 540.73 per square mile (208.8/km^{2}).

The top five reported languages (people were allowed to report up to two languages, thus the figures will generally add to more than 100%) were English (98.3%), Spanish (1.4%), Indo-European (0.0%), Asian and Pacific Islander (0.3%), and Other (0.0%).

The median age in the city was 32.7 years.

=== 2010 census ===
As of the 2010 census, there were 2,563 people, 1,013 households, and 696 families residing in the city. The population density was 1,166.06 inhabitants per square mile (450.2/km^{2}). There were 1,095 housing units at an average density of 498.18 per square mile (192.3/km^{2}). The racial makeup of the city was 98.28% White, 0.20% African American, 0.23% Native American, 0.20% Asian, 0.08% Pacific Islander, 0.23% from some other races and 0.78% from two or more races. Hispanic or Latino people of any race were 0.70% of the population.

There were 1,013 households, of which 39.9% had children under the age of 18 living with them, 53.5% were married couples living together, 10.7% had a female householder with no husband present, 4.5% had a male householder with no wife present, and 31.3% were non-families. 27.5% of all households were made up of individuals, and 14% had someone living alone who was 65 years of age or older. The average household size was 2.50 and the average family size was 3.05.

The median age in the city was 36.2 years. 29.8% of residents were under the age of 18; 4.7% were between the ages of 18 and 24; 27.9% were from 25 to 44; 22.8% were from 45 to 64; and 14.8% were 65 years of age or older. The gender makeup of the city was 49.1% male and 50.9% female.

=== 2000 census ===
As of the 2000 census, there were 2,173 people, 865 households, and 569 families residing in the city. The population density was 1,032.83 inhabitants per square mile (398.8/km^{2}). There were 923 housing units at an average density of 438.70 per square mile (169.4/km^{2}). The racial makeup of the city was 99.40% White, 0.00% African American, 0.23% Native American, 0.14% Asian, 0.00% Pacific Islander, 0.05% from some other races and 0.18% from two or more races. Hispanic or Latino people of any race were 0.69% of the population.

There were 865 households, out of which 33.2% had children under the age of 18 living with them, 54.5% were married couples living together, 8.0% had a female householder with no husband present, and 34.2% were non-families. 31.2% of all households were made up of individuals, and 17.9% had someone living alone who was 65 years of age or older. The average household size was 2.42 and the average family size was 3.05.

In the city, the population was spread out, with 26.6% under the age of 18, 7.3% from 18 to 24, 27.2% from 25 to 44, 19.9% from 45 to 64, and 19.1% who were 65 years of age or older. The median age was 38 years. For every 100 females, there were 95.4 males. For every 100 females age 18 and over, there were 89.8 males.

The median income for a household in the city was $35,814, and the median income for a family was $44,760. Males had a median income of $35,625 versus $22,311 for females. The per capita income for the city was $18,373. About 3.4% of families and 6.7% of the population were below the poverty line, including 4.9% of those under age 18 and 16.4% of those age 65 or over.

== Arts and culture ==
Barnesville Potato Days is held annually in August and draws approximately 14,000 people each year. The festival includes potato-picking and peeling contests, and food booths serving a variety of potato dishes and preparations.

Barnesville hosts the Clay County Fair in mid-July, featuring animals and produce of the county, as well as rides and displays.

== Education ==
The Barnesville Public School District (ISD 146):

- Atkinson Elementary School (Kindergarten through 6th grades)
- Barnesville High School (7th through 12th grades)

There are 875 students at the school district in the School Year 2025-'26.

== Gallery ==
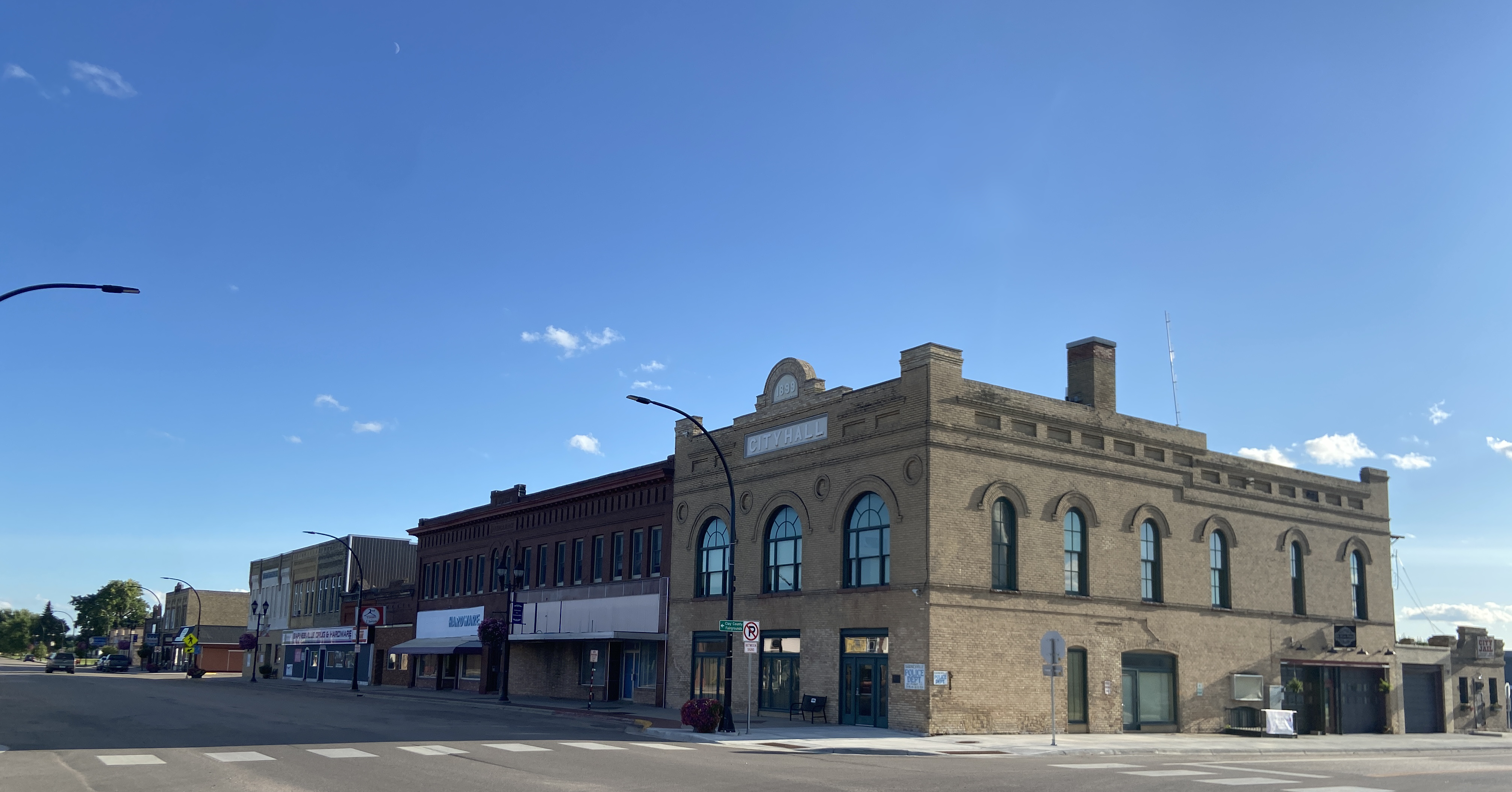
Downtown Barnesville

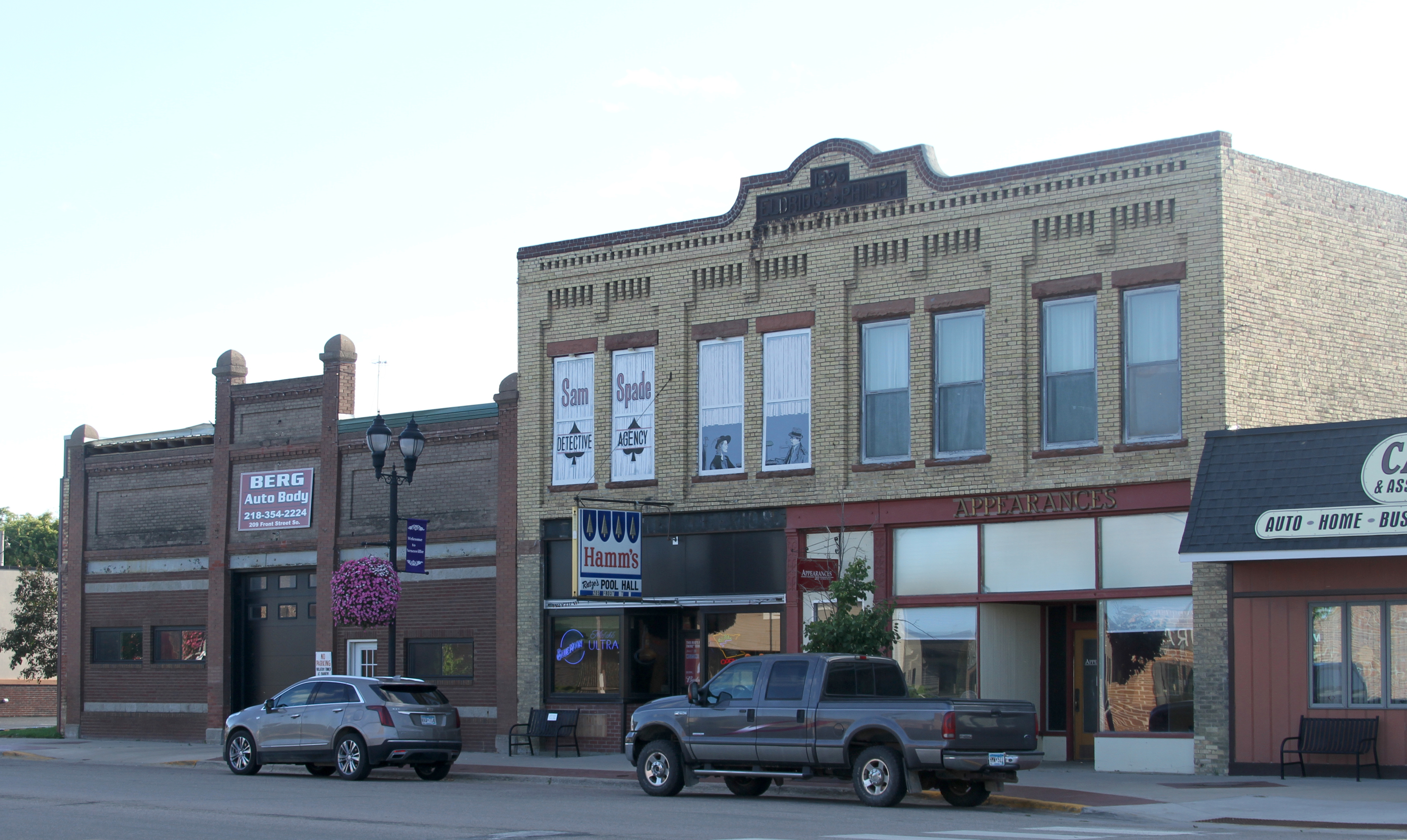
Eldridge & Philippi Building

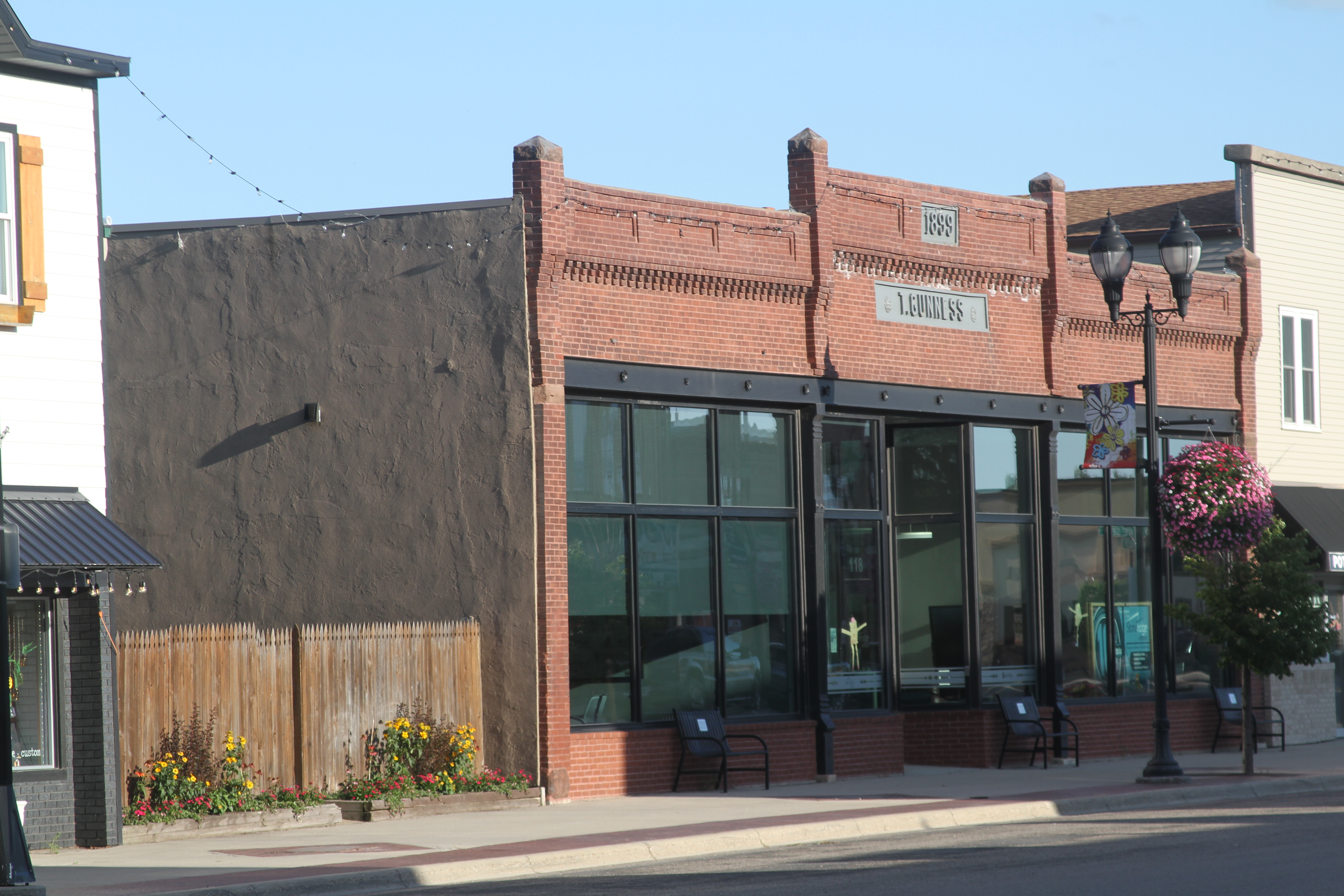
T. Gunness Building

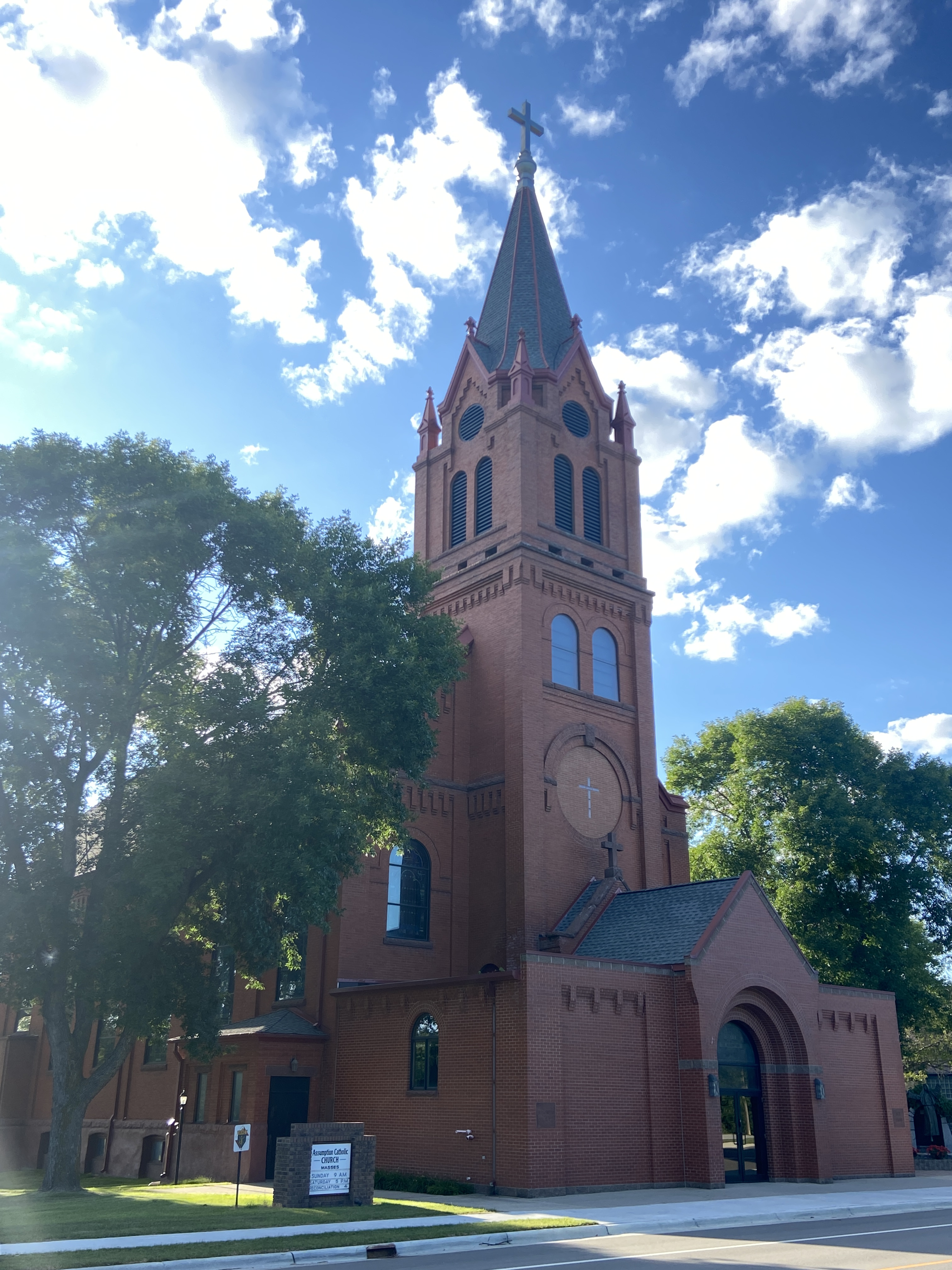
Assumption Catholic Church

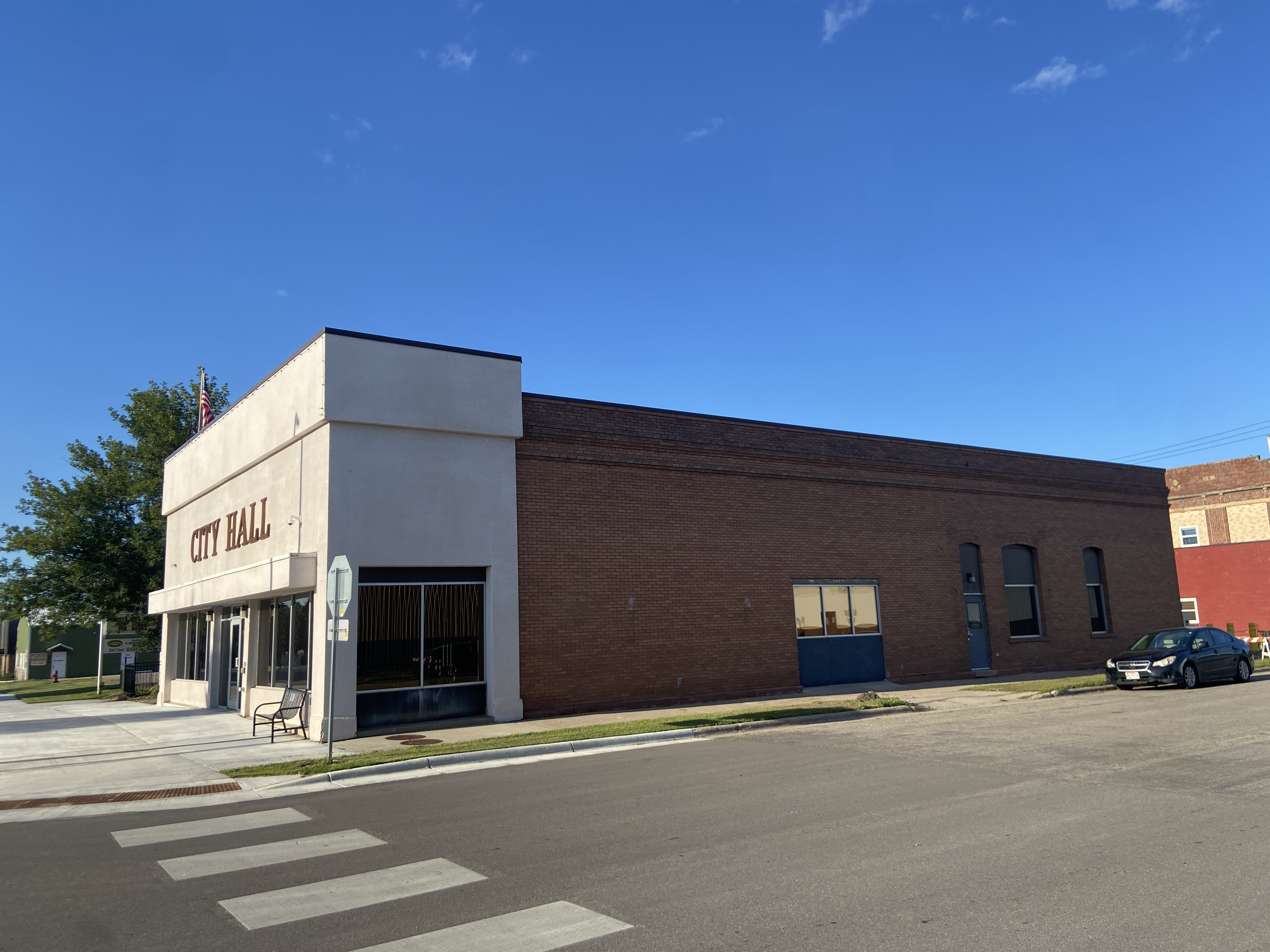
City Hall

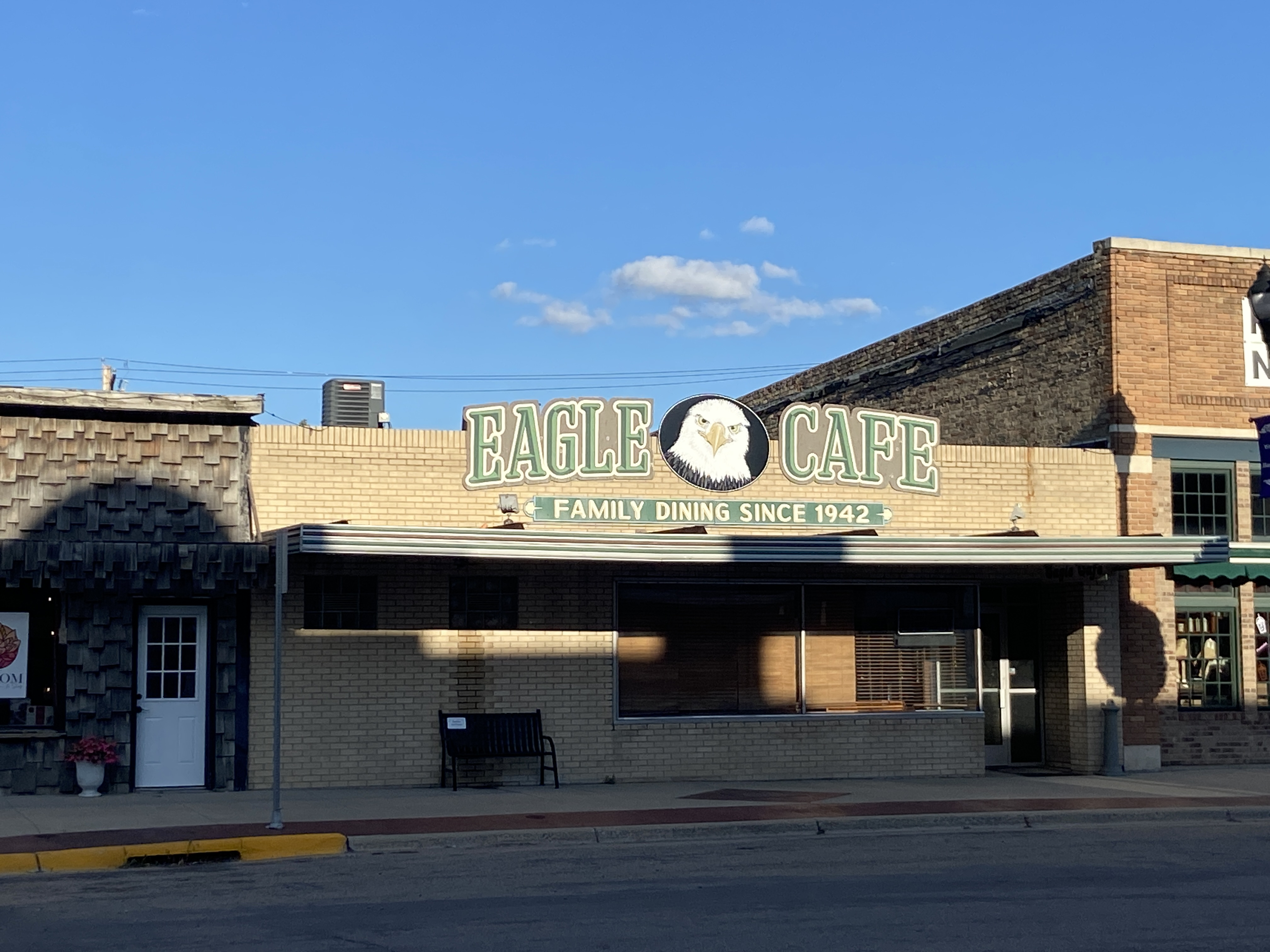
Eagle Cafe

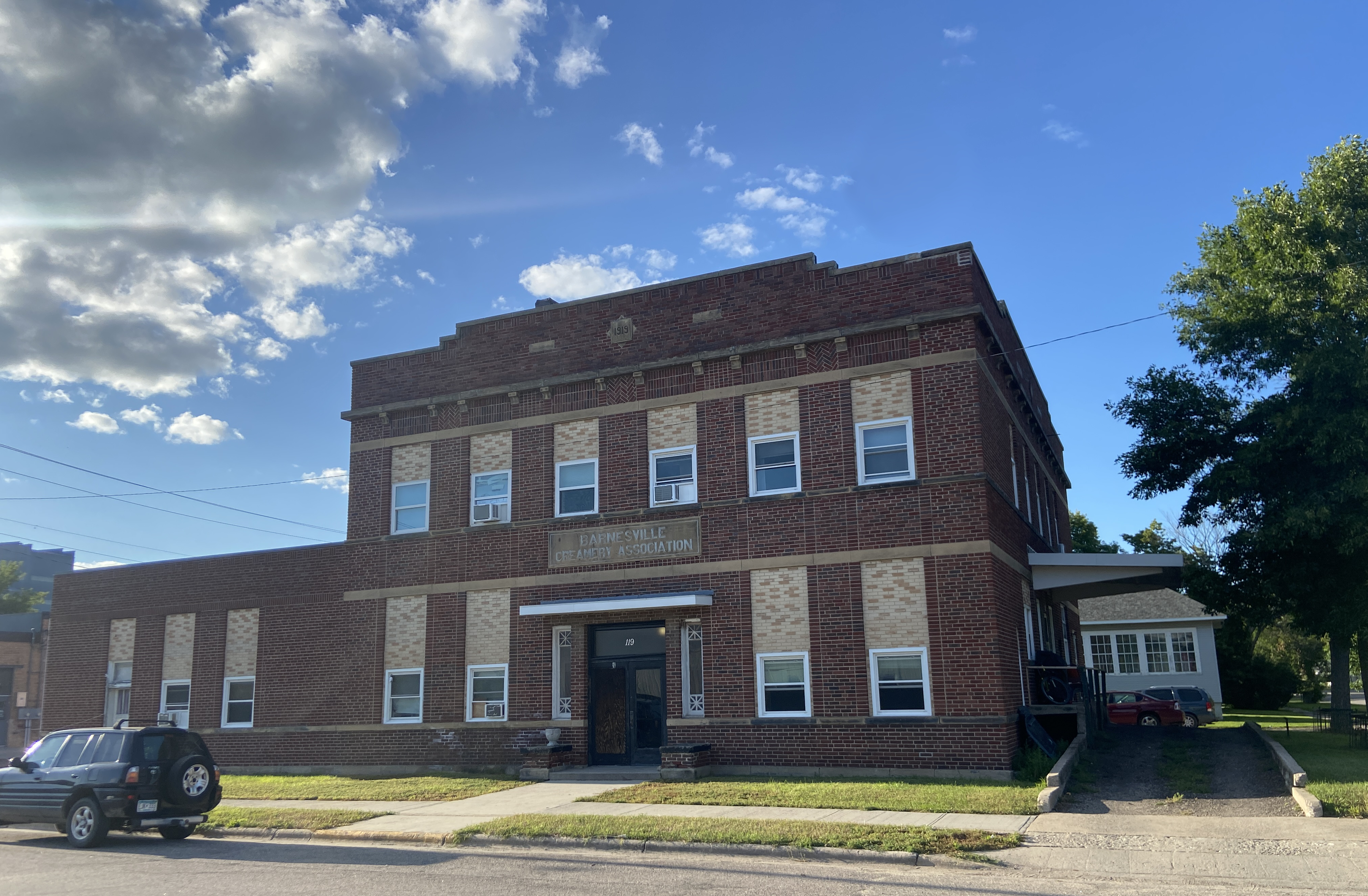
Old Barnesville Creamery Association building

== Notable people ==
- Alta King (born 1899 in Barnesville), a dancer and Ziegfeld girl
- David Moe, basketball coach
- Sara Jane Olson, far-left activist
- Arlan Stangeland, U.S. representative from Minnesota
- Neil Wohlwend, Minnesota state legislator, football and basketball coach
