= The Eternal Temptress =

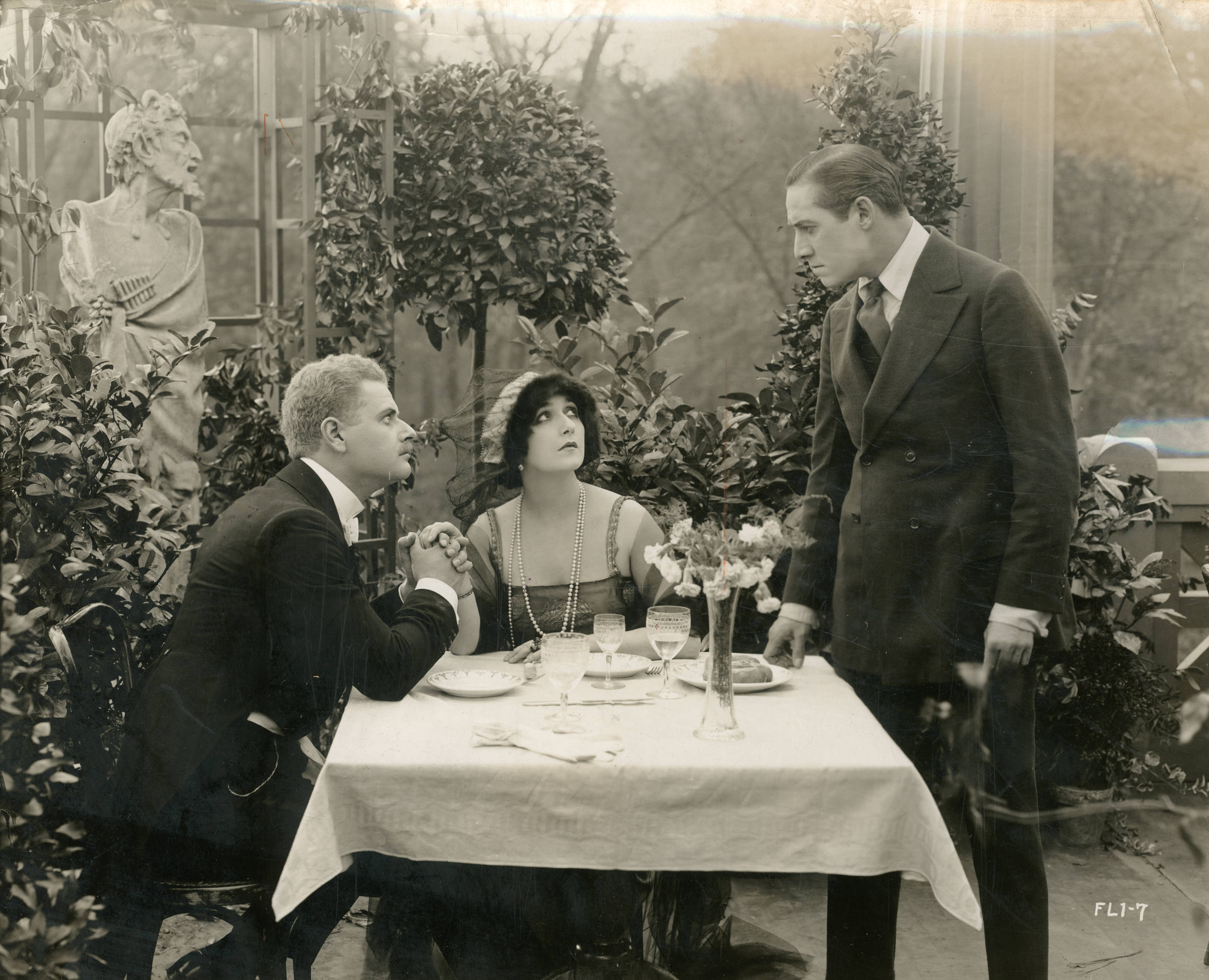
- Still with Alan Hale, Lina Cavalieri, and Elliott Dexter
- Directed by: Émile Chautard
- Screenplay by: Fred de Gresac; Eve Unsell
- Starring: Lina Cavalieri; Elliott Dexter; Mildred Conselman; Alan Hale, Sr. Edward Fielding; Hallen Mostyn
- Cinematography: Jacques Bizeul (fr)
- Production company: Famous Players Film Company
- Distributed by: Paramount Pictures
- Release date: December 9, 1917
- Running time: 50 minutes
- Country: United States
- Language: Silent (English intertitles)

The Eternal Temptress is a 1917 American silent drama film directed by Émile Chautard and written by Fred de Gresac and Eve Unsell. The film stars Lina Cavalieri, Elliott Dexter, Mildred Conselman, Alan Hale, Sr., Edward Fielding, and Hallen Mostyn. The film was released on December 9, 1917, by Paramount Pictures.

== Plot ==
As described in a film magazine, Harry Althrop, a young American, is in love with Princess Cordelia and when he finds his funds are getting low he forges the signature of Thomas Lawton, the American ambassador and a close friend of his father, to a check so that he might buy the beautiful Italian princess some jewelry. Count Rudolph Frizel of Austria, anxious to obtain information concerning Italy's stand in an approaching war, threatens to expose Harry unless he provides the documents from the American embassy. It turns out that the specific documents are readily available with the ambassador, and Harry picks them up and gives them to the Count. This act is discovered by the ambassador and Harry is brought to trial. Cordelia learning of Harry's predicament, goes to Count Frizel and kills him to obtain the documents. The documents are then returned to the embassy, and Harry is released. Cordelia returns home, takes poison and dies in her lovers arms. The film ends with Cordelia on her bier.

== Cast ==
- Lina Cavalieri as Princess Cordelia
- Elliott Dexter as Harry Althrop
- Mildred Conselman as Angela
- Alan Hale, Sr. as Count Rudolph Frizel
- Edward Fielding as Prince Estezary
- Hallen Mostyn as Colonel Althrop
- James Laffey as Ambassador Thomas Lawton
- Pierre De Matteis as Boggslov
- Peter Barbierre as Jeweler

== Reception ==
Like many American films of the time, The Eternal Temptress was subject to cuts by city and state film censorship boards. The Chicago Board of Censors required, in Reel 5, a cut of a closeup of choking the young woman and her taking the poison.

== Preservation ==
With no prints of The Eternal Temptress located in any film archives, it is a lost film.
