= Alta King =

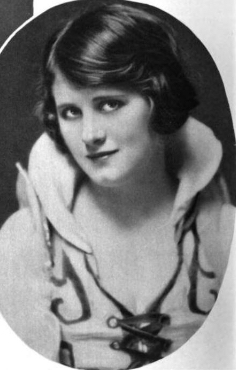
- Alta King, from a 1921 publication
- Born: March 21, 1899; Barnesville, Minnesota, U.S.
- Died: March 1981 (aged 81–82); Troy, New York, U.S.
- Occupations: Dancer, singer
- Spouse: James Edward Royce (m. 1925)

Alta L. King (March 21, 1899 – March 1981) was an American dancer, singer, and Ziegfeld girl in musical theatre.

== Early life ==
King was born in Barnesville, Minnesota, the daughter of John F. King (1866–1939) and Alta Mae Kimpton King (1876–1956), who had both been born in Wisconsin. She had a younger brother named Kenneth. She left school after completing 10th grade.

== Career ==
King's stage career began in a stock company in Minneapolis. Her Broadway credits included appearances in Ziegfeld Follies of 1919, Ziegfeld Follies of 1920, Sally (1920–1922), Orange Blossoms (1922), and Cinders (1923). She was also in the Ziegfeld Midnight Frolic, and performed on the roof of the New Amsterdam Theatre. She was considered to have the "stage's most beautiful legs", along with Ann Pennington and Mistinguett. She was in the same sextet of Ziegfeld dancers as Elizabeth Meehan and Billie Dove.

After her marriage, she gave recitals as a soprano singer.

== Personal life ==
King married English-born theatrical producer and director James Edward Royce (1870–1964) in 1925. In 1940, her occupation was listed as model.
