= W. Graham Browne =

Irish actor (1870–1937)

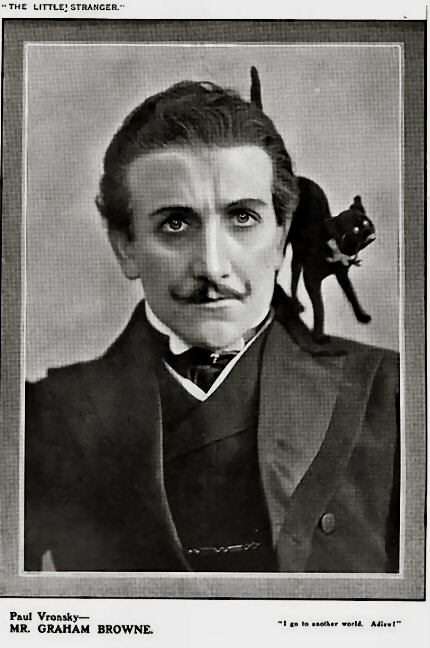
- as Paul Vronsky in The Little Stranger (1906)
- Born: William Graham Browne; 1 January 1870; Ireland
- Died: 11 March 1937 (aged 67); London, England
- Other names: Graham Browne
- Years active: 1900s–1937
- Spouse: Marie Tempest (m.1921)

William Graham Browne (1 January 1870 – 11 March 1937) was an Irish actor who appeared on Broadway and in films during the early 20th century. Born in Ireland, he was married first to actress Madge McIntosh and later to actress Marie Tempest. They appeared together in premieres of two plays by Noël Coward: Hay Fever (1925) and The Marquise (1927).

== Selected Credits ==
=== Film ===
Year	Film	Role	Distributor	Notes
1915	Mrs. Plum's Pudding	Lord Burlington	Universal Film Manufacturing Company	
1934	The Lady is Willing	Pignolet	Columbia Pictures	
1935	The Night of the Party		Gaumont	
1936	All In		Gaumont	
1937	Moonlight Sonata	Dr. Kurt Broman	United Artists	

=== Theatre ===
Year	Production	Role	Theatre(s)	Notes
1909	Weekend		Criterion Theatre	
1909	Penelope		Lyceum Theatre	
1910	Caste		Empire Theatre	Also directed.
1915	The Duke of Killicrankie		Lyceum Theatre	
