= Francis de Croisset =

Belgian-born French playwright and opera librettist

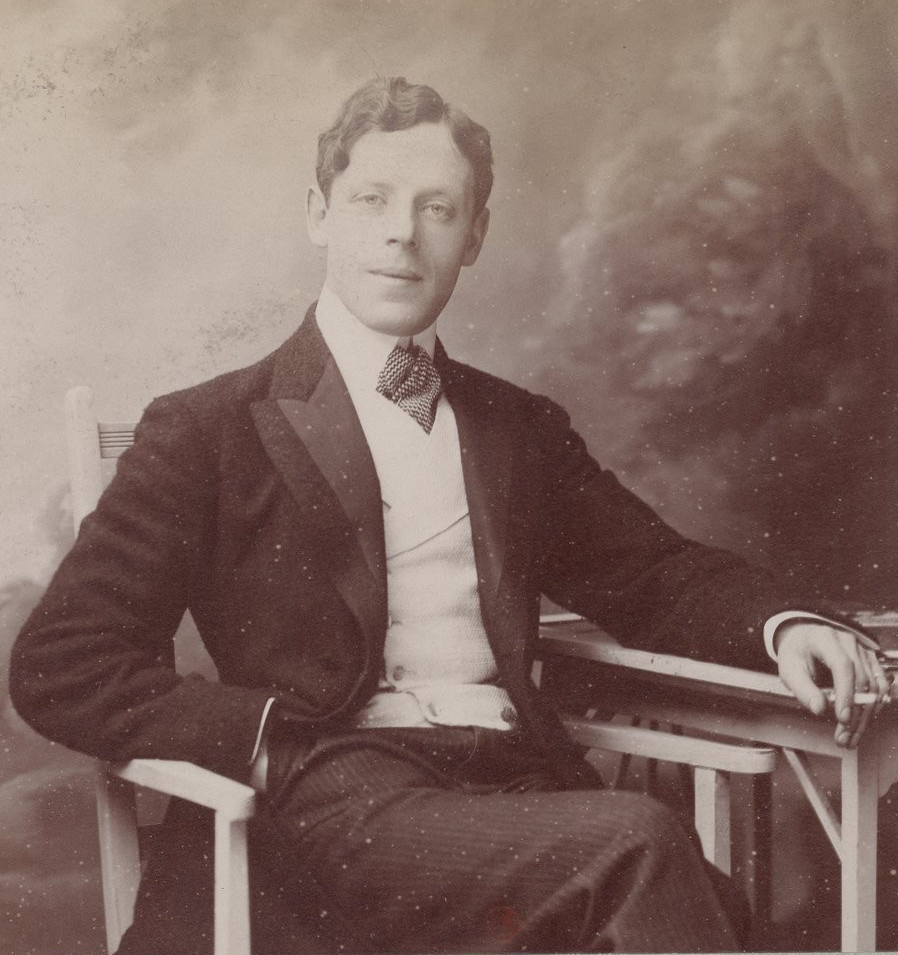
- Photograph of de Croisset by Nadar
- Born: Franz Wiener; 28 January 1877; Brussels, Belgium
- Died: 8 November 1937 (aged 60); Neuilly, France
- Spouse: Marie-Thérèse Bischoffsheim (m. 1910)
- Children: 2
- Relatives: Philippe de Montebello
- Awards: Croix de Guerre

Francis de Croisset (French: [fʁɑ̃sis də kʁwasɛ]; born Franz Wiener, 28 January 1877 – 8 November 1937) was a Belgian-born French playwright and opera librettist.

== Early life ==
Born as Franz Wiener, he was educated in Brussels on 28 January 1877 into a prominent Jewish-Belgian family that was distinguished in diplomacy and the army. His parents were Alexandre Jacques Wiener and Eugenie Bertha (née Straus) Wiener. After moving to France, where he spent most of his life, he had his name changed by Presidential decree.

At age 17, he rebelled against his parents' wishes that he take up a military career, and ran away to Paris. In 1901, his play Chérubin was produced at the Comédie-Française where Cécile Sorel (later the Comtesse de Ségur) made her debut in it. Jules Massenet set Chérubin to music and, in 1905, Mary Garden sang its première at the Opéra de Monte-Carlo.

== Career ==
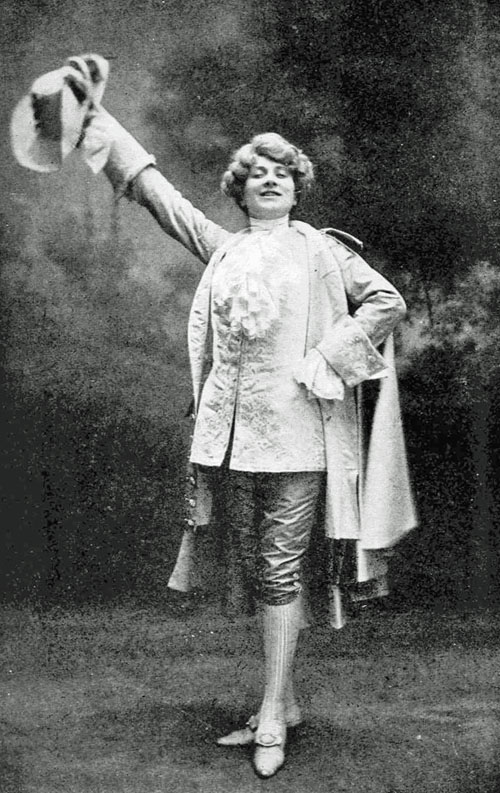
Mary Garden at the 1905 première of Chérubin

He was a lawyer by profession, but de Croisset gradually devoted more and more time to the theatre, "until play writing became his vocation."

His opera librettos include Massenet's Chérubin (1905), based on his play of the same name, and Reynaldo Hahn's Ciboulette (1923).

In 1919, de Croisset went to the United States to study film for the French government. By 1927, his name was attached to more than fifty plays. In 1925, he collaborated with Somerset Maugham on Dr. Miracle, which was produced in New York City. Additional plays were produced in New York, including Pierre or Jack?.

=== Military service ===
Notwithstanding his aversion to a career in the military, upon the outbreak of World War I, he enlisted in the French Army as a private, serving for four years before mustering out as a Lieutenant. He was twice decorated for his gallantry, including being awarded the Croix de Guerre for his valor.

== Personal life ==
In 1909, he was engaged to Mlle. Isola, the daughter of one of the directors of the Théâtre de la Gaîté. The engagement was broken off and, instead, he married wealthy widow Marie-Thérèse Bischoffsheim, in 1910. A daughter of Count and Countess Adhéaume de Chevigné, she was a descendant of the Marquis de Sade and her grandmother Laure de Sade was, in part, the inspiration for the character of the Duchess of Guermantes in Marcel Proust's Remembrance of Things Past). From her first marriage to banking heir Maurice Bischoffsheim, she had a daughter, the arts patron Marie-Laure de Noailles (later the Vicomtesse de Noailles from her 1923 marriage to Charles, Vicomte de Noailles). Together, Marie-Thérèse and Francis were the parents of two children:

- Philippe de Croisset (1912–1965), who married Ethel Woodward, a daughter of American banker William Woodward, in 1941. After having two sons, they divorced and Philippe married Jacqueline de la Chaume. After his death in 1965, she became the third wife of actor Yul Brynner.
- Germaine de Croisset (1913–1975), who married Marquis André Roger Lannes de Montebello (1908–1986), in 1933.

De Croisset died at the American Hospital of Paris in Neuilly on 8 November 1937. His widow died in Grasse in October 1963.

=== Descendants ===
Through his son Philippe, he was a grandfather of two boys. One of which is Charles de Croisset, a French banker. Though his daughter Germaine, he was a grandfather of four boys, including Georges de Montebello (1934–1996), an investment banker and president of the Swiss Helvetia Fund, and Philippe de Montebello (b. 1936), the Director of the Metropolitan Museum of Art in New York City from 1977 until 2008.

== Filmography ==
- The Marriage of Kitty, directed by George Melford (1915, based on the play La Passerelle)
- Arsène Lupin, directed by George Loane Tucker (UK, 1916, based on the play Arsène Lupin)
- Arsène Lupin, directed by Paul Scardon (1917, based on the play Arsène Lupin)
- The Hawk, directed by Paul Scardon (1917, based on the play L'Épervier)
- L'Épervier, directed by Robert Boudrioz (France, 1925, based on the play L'Épervier)
- Afraid to Love, directed by Edward H. Griffith (1927, based on the play La Passerelle)
- The New Gentlemen, directed by Jacques Feyder (France, 1929, based on the play Les Nouveaux Messieurs)
- Arsène Lupin, directed by Jack Conway (1932, based on the play Arsène Lupin)
- Les Vignes du Seigneur, directed by René Hervil (France, 1932, based on the play Les Vignes du Seigneur)
- Il était une fois, directed by Léonce Perret (France, 1933, based on the play Il était une fois)
- Ciboulette, directed by Claude Autant-Lara (France, 1933, based on the operetta Ciboulette)
- L'Épervier, directed by Marcel L'Herbier (France, 1933, based on the play L'Épervier)
- Le cœur dispose, directed by Georges Lacombe (France, 1936, based on the play Le Cœur dispose)
- Take My Tip, directed by Herbert Mason (UK, 1937, based on the play La Livrée de M. Le Comte)
- Head over Heels, directed by Sonnie Hale (UK, 1937, based on the play Pierre ou Jack?)
- Woman of Malacca, directed by Marc Allégret (France, 1937, based on the novel La Dame de Malacca)
  - Another World, directed by Marc Allégret and Alfred Stöger (German, 1937, based on the novel La Dame de Malacca)
- A Woman's Face, directed by Gustaf Molander (Sweden, 1938, based on the play Il était une fois...)
- A Woman's Face, directed by George Cukor (1941, based on the play Il était une fois...)
- Les Vignes du Seigneur, directed by Jean Boyer (France, 1958, based on the play Les Vignes du Seigneur)
- Le Maestro, directed by Claude Vital (France, 1977, based on the play Les Vignes du Seigneur)
