= Marie Tempest =

English singer and comic actress (1864–1942)

Dame Marie Tempest DBE
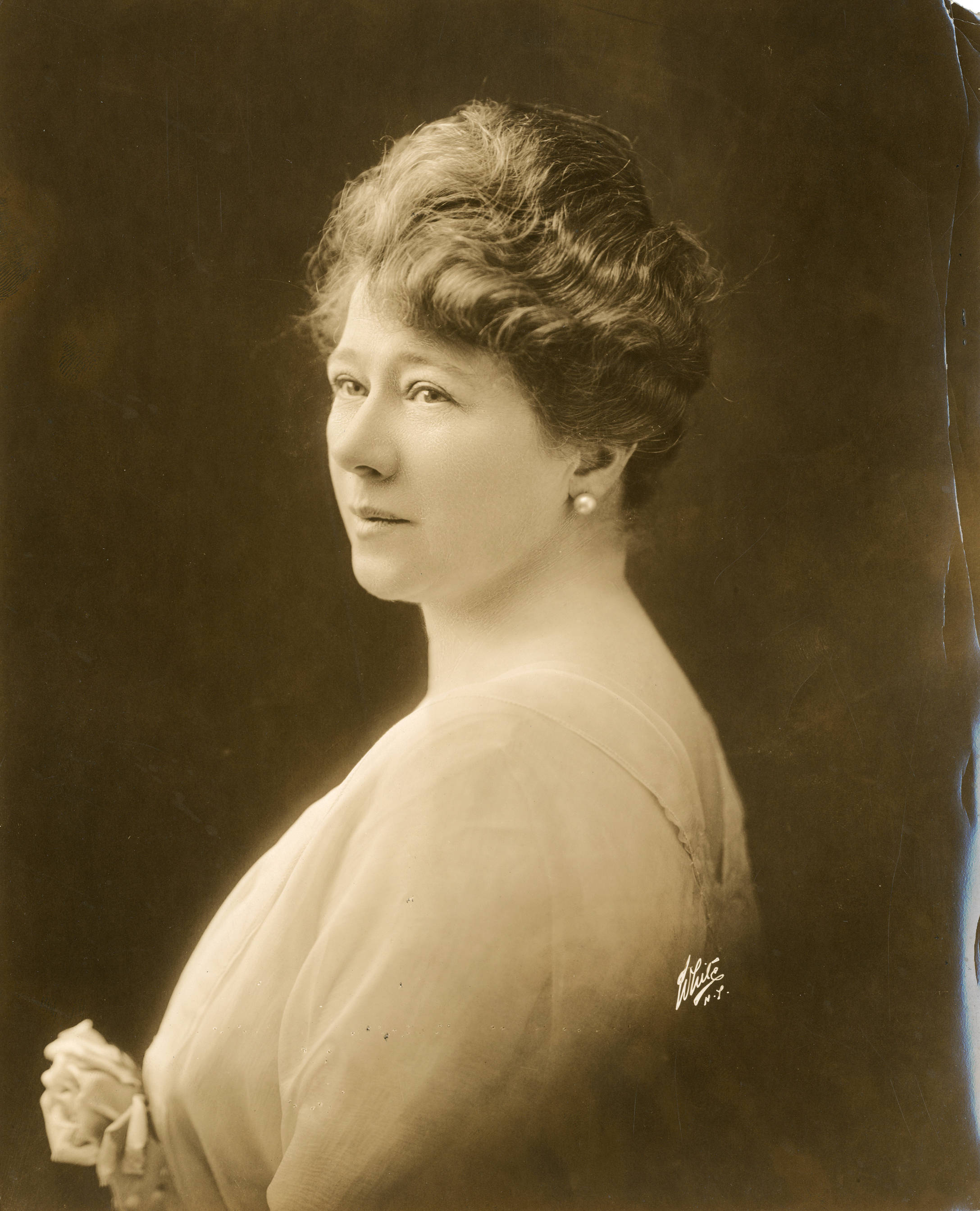
- Tempest in 1915
- Born: Mary Susan Etherington; 15 July 1864; London, UK
- Died: 15 October 1942 (aged 78); London, UK
- Occupations: Actress and singer
- Spouses: Alfred Edward Izard (m. 1885; div. 1889) Cosmo Gordon-Lennox (m. 1898; died 1921) W. Graham Brown (m. 1921; died 1937)

Dame Mary Susan Etherington (15 July 1864 – 15 October 1942), known professionally as Marie Tempest, was an English singer and actress.

Tempest became a famous soprano in late Victorian light opera and Edwardian musical comedies. Later, she became a leading comic actress and toured widely in North America and elsewhere. She was, at times, her own theatre manager during a career spanning 55 years. She was also instrumental in the founding of the actors' union Equity in Britain.

== Life and career ==
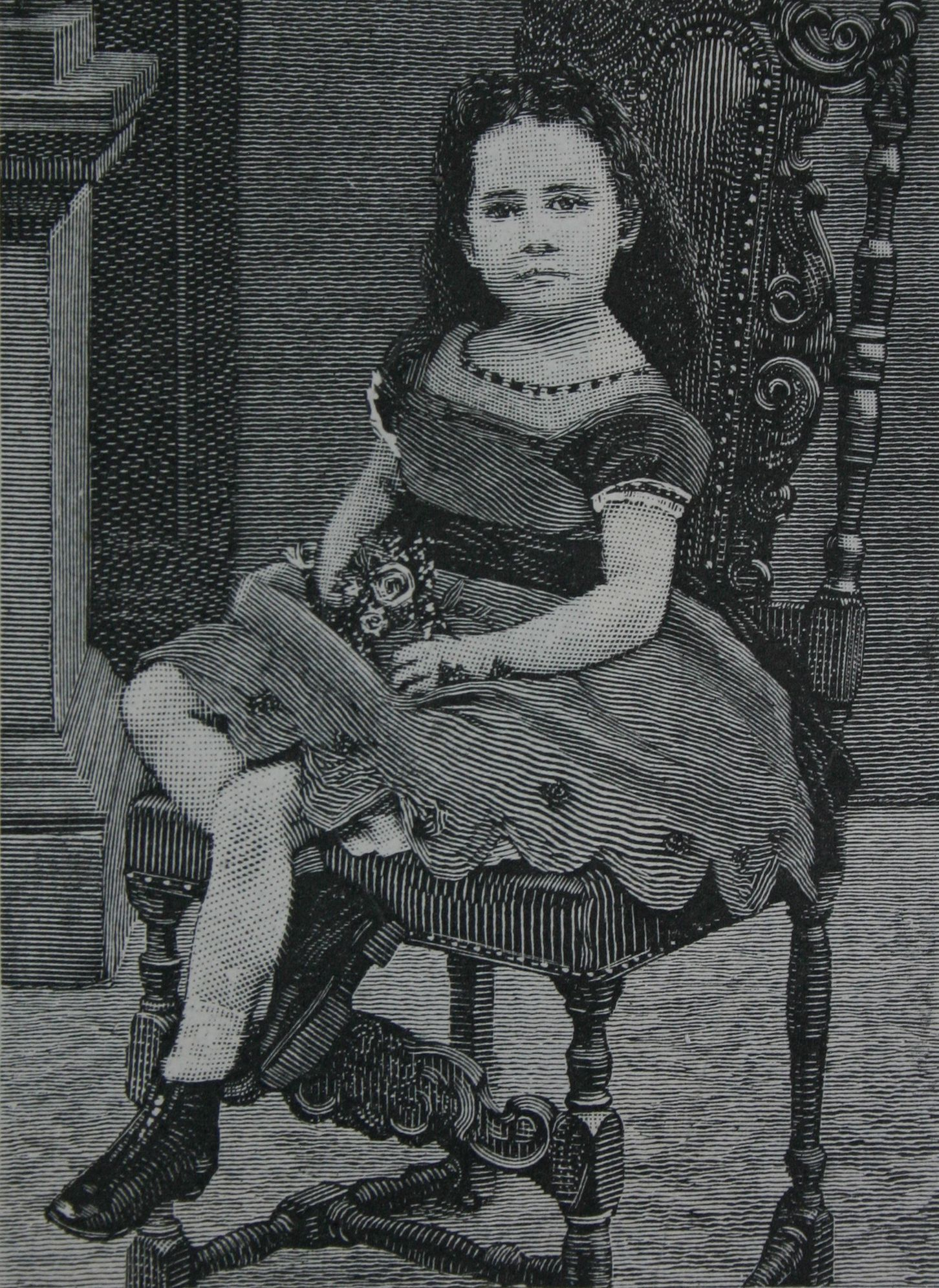
Tempest, age six

Tempest was born in London. Her parents were Edwin Etherington (1838–1880), a stationer, and his wife, Sarah Mary (née Castle). She had a sister, Florence Etherington, who married the theatre manager Michael Levenston. Tempest was educated at Midhurst School and an Ursuline convent in Tildonk, Belgium. Later, she studied music in Paris and at the Royal Academy of Music in London, as a singing pupil of Manuel García, the tutor of Jenny Lind, Mathilde Marchesi and Charles Santley, among others. She adopted as her stage name part of the name of Lady Susan Vane-Tempest, whom she referred to as her godmother.

Tempest married Alfred Edward Izard, a professor at the Academy, in 1885. That marriage ended in divorce four years later, and Izard was awarded damages in the divorce settlement. She had a son named Norman in 1888, who would later be referred to in the press as "Norman Lennox", taking part of the surname of Tempest's second husband, Cosmo Gordon-Lennox, whom she married a decade later.

=== Early career ===
Tempest debuted in 1885 as Fiametta in Franz Suppé's operetta Boccaccio at the Comedy Theatre in London, where she also took the title role in Erminie by Edward Jakobowski. She starred steadily in London for the next two years in light operas by Hervé and André Messager, among others. She became internationally famous for her performance in the title role in Dorothy by Alfred Cellier and B. C. Stephenson (1887), which ran for a record-setting 931 performances (becoming a hit after Tempest took over the title role from Marion Hood). Richard D'Oyly Carte considered engaging her for his opera company but W. S. Gilbert (after seeing her in Dorothy) reported that she "screeched", and the proposal was dropped.

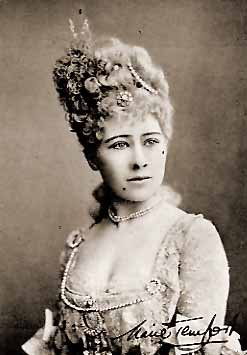
Tempest in Dorothy, 1886

In 1889 Tempest was a replacement player in the title role of Cellier and Stephenson's Doris, brought in to save the flagging show. The next year, in 1890, she created the role of Kitty Carol in The Red Hussar in London and then in New York. She then toured the United States and Canada for a year with the J. C. Duff Comic Opera Company in operas including Carmen, Manon, Mignon, The Bohemian Girl and The Pirates of Penzance. She returned to Broadway for the next three years in numerous productions including The Tyrolean, The Fencing Master by Reginald De Koven and Harry B. Smith, and The Algerian. During this period she was considered one of the few rivals of Lillian Russell. An American critic wrote in 1894, "Miss Tempest combines a voice of extraordinary pitch and sweetness with the dramatic fervor of an emotional actress to a greater degree probably than any other prima donna now upon the English speaking stage".

In 1895 George Edwardes brought her back to London to star in his Daly's Theatre productions, beginning with Adele in An Artist's Model, which ran for more than 400 performances. This was followed by title roles in the even more successful The Geisha (1896), which ran for 760 performances, A Greek Slave (1898) and another international hit, San Toy (1899). Tempest could be a difficult star, and her arguments with Edwardes and some of her colleagues were well known. She later said, "I was a self-important little baggage, who was more disliked than liked by managers in those days". She felt that Edwardes was too strict and finally left San Toy in 1900, reportedly over a quarrel about her costume.

=== 1899 through World War I years ===
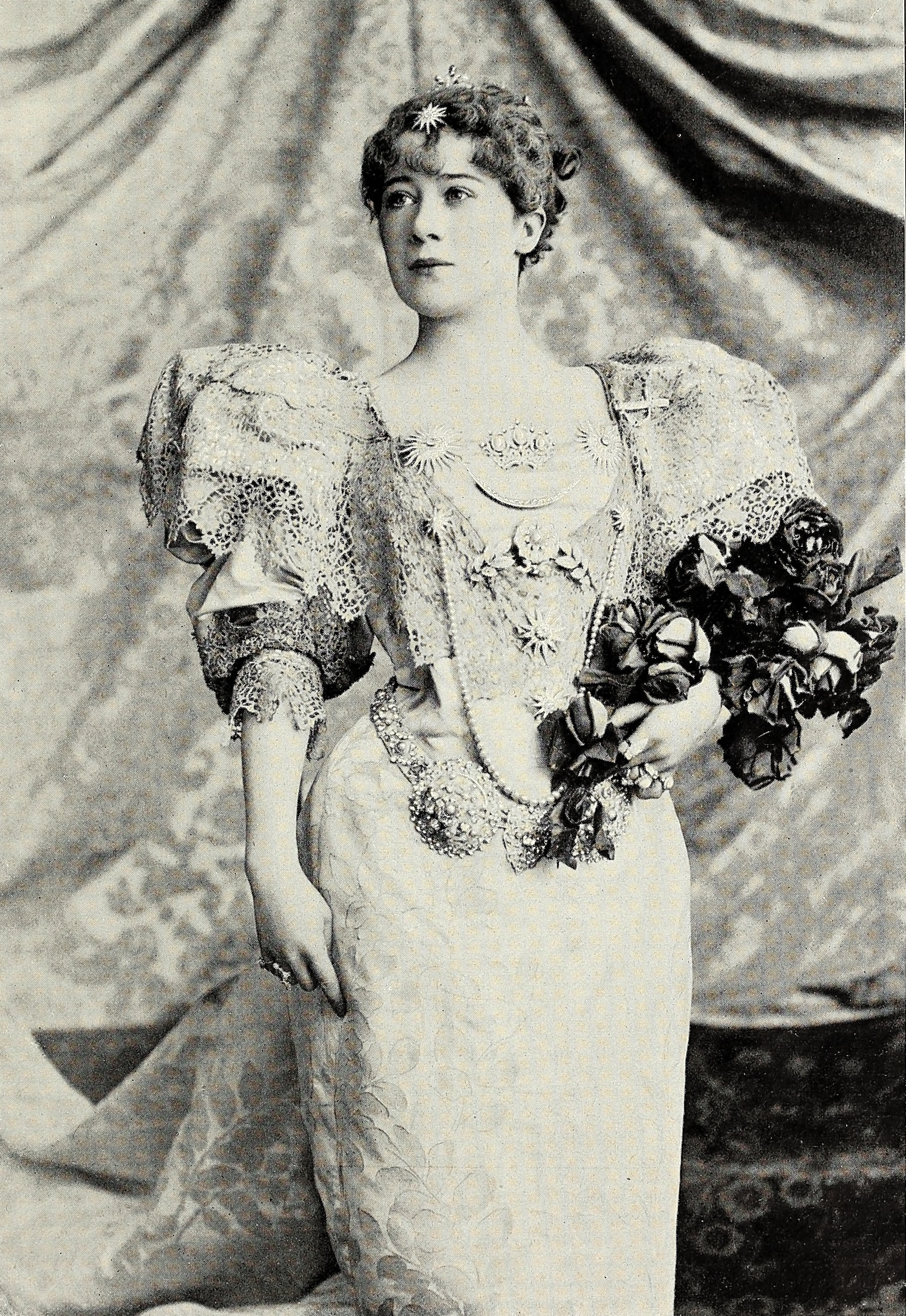
Tempest in 1894

In 1898 Tempest married again, to the actor-playwright Cosmo Gordon-Lennox (known professionally as Cosmo Stuart), the son of Lord Alexander Gordon-Lennox. On his advice, Tempest forsook operettas for straight comedy. In 1900 she created the role of Nell Gwynne in Anthony Hope's English Nell (based on Simon Dale) at the Prince of Wales's Theatre in London, followed at the same theatre in 1901 by the title roles in Peg Woffington by Charles Reade, and Becky Sharp, an adaptation of Vanity Fair, by Robert Hichens and her husband. The same year, she played Polly Eccles in T. W. Robertson's Caste, followed in 1902 by the title role in The Marriage of Kitty, also written by her husband. These established her as a leading comedy actress, particularly when playing the type of vivacious lady in drawing room comedies that Time called "a Marie Tempest part... a sprightly, well-bred matron, with a feline manner and a sharp tongue but a heart of gold." Max Beerbohm described her as "one of the very few English actresses equipped for emotion".

After many more such roles at the Duke of York's Theatre and the Comedy Theatre, Tempest toured in America in 1904, reprising her role in The Marriage of Kitty and in the title role of The Freedom of Suzanne. She appeared in London in 1907 in The Truth at the Comedy Theatre, written and directed by and starring Dion Boucicault, though "it is the acting of Miss Tempest that people will go to see," said The Observer, "and they will not be disappointed". She also starred in Alfred Sutro's The Barrier in 1907. In 1908 Somerset Maugham's Mrs. Dot provided her with arguably her finest role, followed by parts in All-of-a-Sudden Peggy and Penelope. She returned to America in 1909 for a two-year tour, and appearing in such plays as Caste and Vanity Fair.

Returning to England in 1911, Tempest joined a star-studded cast for Herbert Beerbohm Tree's production of The Critic by Richard Brinsley Sheridan, also starring Arthur Bourchier, C. Hayden Coffin, Lily Elsie, George Grossmith, Jr., Charles Hawtrey, Cyril Maude, Gerald Du Maurier, Gertie Millar, Edmund Payne, Courtice Pounds, Violet Vanbrugh and Arthur Williams, among others. She then began to manage the theatres in which she starred. She leased The Duke of York's Theatre and produced a revival of The Marriage of Kitty. She starred in her own productions in London theatres for the next few years. This followed in 1913 by the revival of London Assurance, given in aid of the King George's Actors Pension Fund. She spent eight years, beginning in 1914, touring in America, Canada, Australia, New Zealand, South Africa, India, Singapore, China, Japan and the Philippines. One of her parts, in 1915, was the title role in J. M. Barrie's Rosalind. Barrie admired Tempest's ability to both laugh and cry, writing, "such a masterpiece at letting these two melt one into the other, not only upon her own face, but on the faces of all those in front".

=== Later years and death ===
Tempest in Hay Fever, 1925

Tempest finally returned to England via America in 1922, reviving The Marriage of Kitty. Her second husband had died in 1921, and she married again that same year, this time in Sydney to the actor William Graham Browne, who had accompanied her throughout her tour, and who regularly partnered her onstage in her subsequent West End appearances. By the 1920s, Tempest had outgrown her troublesome temperament and moved into playing charming and elegant middle-aged women. In 1924 she took a singing part again in Clifford Bax's Midsummer Madness at the Lyric Theatre, Hammersmith. She created the role of Judith Bliss in Noël Coward's Hay Fever (1925), in which she was followed in later revivals by leading actresses from Edith Evans to Judi Dench. Her popularity continued in such shows as Passing Brompton Road by Jevan Brandon-Thomas and The Cat's Cradle by Aimee and Philip Stuart. She also had one more singing role in 1927 in The Marquise, written for her by Coward. ("It is a dried and brittle little piece, but it frames the great actress adequately".) She then starred as Olivia in Mr. Pim Passes By by A. A. Milne (1928), The First Mrs Fraser by St. John Ervine (1929, giving 632 performances at the Haymarket Theatre), and Fanny Cavendish in Theatre Royal (1934).

In later years, Tempest became active in working for the good of the members of her profession. In 1934, she was instrumental in the founding of the actors' union Equity, when she hosted a dinner at the Savoy Hotel for 85 leading entertainers. On 28 May 1935, Tempest's golden jubilee was celebrated with a benefit performance at the Theatre Royal, Drury Lane attended by King George V and Queen Mary. The programme has tributes from, among others, J. M. Barrie, Noël Coward, Edward German and Somerset Maugham. Tempest appeared in one act each from The Marriage of Kitty and Little Catherine, two of her most popular roles. The proceeds of £5,000 from the event were donated to St George's Hospital for use by members of the theatrical profession.

Coward wrote to Hector Bolitho, her biographer: "she wastes no time on personal inhibitions or inferiority complexes. In fact, she takes off her coat and gets down to the job of the moment with less shi-shi than any actress I have ever met.... Despite the fact that for fifty years she has performed a multitude of plays to multitudes of people, she has always contrived to remain the mistress of her tradition rather than allow any tradition to become the mistress of her."

She was created a Dame Commander of the Order of the British Empire (DBE) in 1937, the year in which her third husband, Graham Browne, died. The next year, she created the role of Dora Randolph in Dodie Smith's play Dear Octopus. She continued to act after this, though with less frequency. She toured Great Britain in The First Mrs. Fraser with A. E. Matthews and Barry Morse in 1941, a year before her death. That same year, Tempest's home was bombed in London during the Blitz, and she lost most of her possessions. She remarked, "Hitler has taken nearly everything from me but my life, but you can't live on regret".

Tempest died in London in 1942, at the age of 78, and was cremated at Golders Green Crematorium. A blue plaque was placed at the site of her home at 24 Park Crescent in London.

== Filmography ==
- 1900 – San Toy in San Toy
- 1915 – Mrs. Plum in Mrs. Plum's Pudding
- 1937 – Baroness Lindenborg in Moonlight Sonata
- 1938 – Jennifer Varwell in Yellow Sands

== Sources ==
- Beerbohm, Max (1970). Last Theatres. New York: Taplinger. ISBN 978-0-8008-4564-3. OCLC 1150085558.
- Bolitho, Hector (1936). Marie Tempest. London: Cobden-Sanderson. OCLC 852642096.
- Day, Barry, ed. (2007). The Letters of Noël Coward. London: Methuen. ISBN 978-1-4081-0675-4.
- Hyman, Alan (1975). The Gaiety Years. London: Cassell. ISBN 978-0-30-429372-8.
- Jacobs, Arthur (1986). Arthur Sullivan. Oxford: Oxford Paperbacks. ISBN 978-0-19-282033-4.
- Parker, John, ed. (1922). Who's Who in the Theatre (fourth ed.). London: Sir Isaac Pitman and Sons. OCLC 473894893.
- Parker, John, ed. (1939). Who's Who in the Theatre (ninth ed.). London: Sir Isaac Pitman and Sons. OCLC 473894893.
- Richard Traubner (2004). Operetta. New York and London: Routledge. ISBN 978-0-415-96641-2.
