= Cosmo Gordon-Lennox =

British actor and playwright (1869–1921)

Gordon-Lennox c. 1900

Cosmo Charles Gordon-Lennox (17 August 1868 – 31 July 1921), whose stage name was Cosmo Stuart, was a British actor and playwright of the late 19th and early 20th centuries. He became known as an actor in the 1890s, but by the turn of the century he had begun to concentrate on writing, usually under his real name. He specialised in adapting French comedies for the British stage, but also wrote original works, often as vehicles for his wife, the actress Marie Tempest.

== Life and career ==
=== Early years ===
Gordon-Lennox was born on 17 August 1868 in Berkeley Square, Westminster, then in Middlesex, the only surviving child of Lord Alexander Gordon-Lennox and his wife Emily Frances, née Towneley. An infant sister died the following year. He was educated at the Oratory School, Birmingham, after which he was trained as an actor by Sarah Thorne.

As "Cosmo Stuart" he made his first appearance in London, at the Avenue Theatre on 13 November 1894, as Gerard Brewster in a single matinée performance of a farcical comedy, The Joker, presented by Thorne, giving some of her pupils the chance to appear alongside established actors including Alfred Maltby. He then appeared at the Opera Comique as Lord Cyril in a melodrama, The Wife of Dives, on 26 November, winning good notices. In 1895 he created the small role of the Vicomte de Nanjac in Oscar Wilde's An Ideal Husband, and for the subsequent provincial tour he was promoted to a leading role, Lord Goring.

His next parts were Mervyn Thorp in Mrs Ponderbury's Past (Avenue, November 1895). and Paillard in A Night Out, an adaptation of L'Hôtel du libre échange by Georges Feydeau and Maurice Desvallières (Vaudeville, April 1896). The Stage said "he scored a hit in his most pleasing performance of the young guardsman in The Adventure of Lady Ursula at the Duke of York's in October of that year". In 1898 he married the actress Marie Tempest, and although he continued his acting career for some years after that – he appeared with Seymour Hicks in Self and Lady (1900), and with Charles Wyndham in The Case of Rebellious Susan 1901) – he turned mostly to writing, usually under his real name.

=== 20th century ===
Marie Tempest in Gordon-Lennox's The Marriage of Kitty, 1902

In 1901 Gordon-Lennox collaborated with Robert Hitchens in adapting Vanity Fair for the stage. The production, only moderately successful, starred Tempest. Another adaptation, this time from the French, was a farce, The Little French Milliner, from Coralie et Cie, which was given at the Avenue in 1902, and ran for 171 performances. As Cosmo Stuart he appeared in The Princess's Nose (Avenue, March 1902) and The Grass Widow (Shaftesbury, June 1902).

A successful adaptation, in which Tempest played to great advantage, according to The Stage, was the comedy The Marriage of Kitty, from La Passerelle, which ran in 1902–03 at three successive theatres during its run of 293 performances, and ran for a further 36 performances when revived in 1906 It was the first of six of Gordon-Lennox's plays to be produced on Broadway, where Tempest played it for a limited run in 1903–04.

At the Haymarket Theatre in December 1905 Gordon-Lennox, acting under his real name, was in the cast of The Indecision of Mr Kingsbury, which he adapted from Georges Berr's L'Irresolu. After this, he concentrated on writing. For his wife he wrote The Freedom of Suzanne, an original comedy that ran at the Criterion Theatre for 177 performances in 1904–05. He had no success with Miquette (Duke of York's, October 1906), from the French of G. A. Caillavet and Robert de Flers, which closed after two weeks. The Van Dyck (His Majesty's, March 1907), from the French of Eugène Fourrier gave Sir Herbert Tree one of his favourite short parts, but ran for only 32 performances.

The Thief (St James's, November 1907), from Henry Bernstein's Le Voleur, ran for 186 performances and was judged a skilful adaptation. Another adaptation from the French, Angela (1907), had a starry cast including Tempest, Allan Aynesworth, Eric Lewis, Lillah McCarthy and Lydia Bilbrook, but had only a moderate run of 75 performances. Gordon-Lennox's last plays included Her Sister (1907), co-written with Clyde Fitch, seen on Broadway, starring Ethel Barrymore, and Helena's Path written jointly with Anthony Hope, (Duke of York's, May 1910).

Gordon-Lennox died at the cottage hospital, Marlow, Buckinghamshire, after an unsuccessful operation, aged 52. He and Tempest had no children; she later remarried.

== References and sources ==
=== Sources ===
- Wearing, J. P. (1981). The London Stage, 1900–1909: A Calendar of Plays and Players. Metuchen: Scarecrow Press. OCLC 1245534136.
- Wilde, Oscar (1966). Plays. London: Penguin. OCLC 16004478.
