= Paid in Full =

Paid in Full may refer to:

== Music ==
- Paid in Full Entertainment, a record label
- Paid in Full (album), a 1987 hip-hop album by Eric B. & Rakim
  - "Paid in Full" (Eric B. & Rakim song), a 1987 song from the above album
- "Paid in Full" (Sonata Arctica song), a 2007 metal song by Sonata Arctica from the album Unia
- Paid in Full (soundtrack), the soundtrack to the 2002 film

== Film, television and theatre ==
- Paid in Full, a 1908 play by Eugene Walter
  - Paid in Full (1914 film), based on the play
  - Paid in Full (1919 film), based on the play
- Paid in Full (1950 film), directed by William Dieterle
- Paid in Full (2002 film), directed by Charles Stone III
- Paid in Full: The Battle for Black Music, a 2024 British-Canadian documentary television series

== Other ==
- In law and accounting, a debt, bill, invoice, or claim that has been fully paid; an executed contract.
