= Fine Feathers =

Fine Feathers may refer to:

- The Fine Feathers or Fine Feathers a 1912 silent short directed by Lois Weber
- Fine Feathers (1915 American film) by Joseph A. Golden
- Fine Feathers (1915 film) by Maurice Elvey
- Fine Feathers (1921 film) by Fred H. Sittenham
- Fine Feathers (1937 film) by Leslie S. Hiscott
- Fine Feathers (play), 1913 play by Eugene Walter
