= Just a Wife (film) =

1920 film

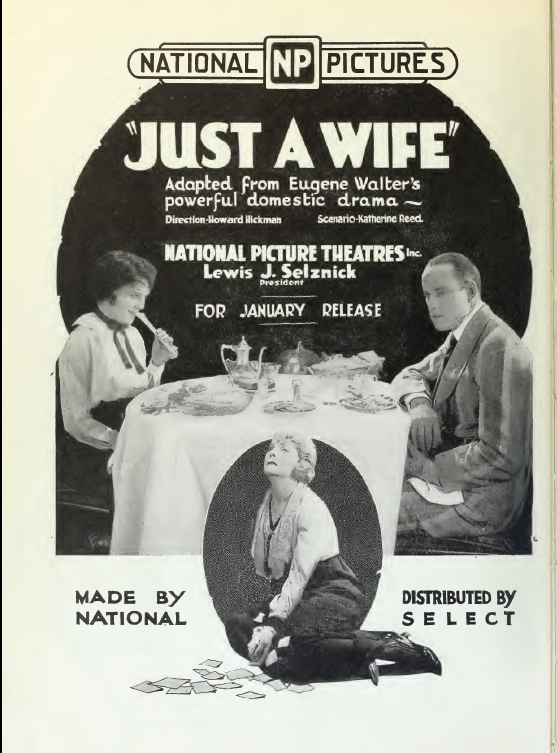
- Directed by: Howard Hickman
- Written by: Katherine S. Reed
- Based on: Just a Wife by Eugene Walter
- Produced by: Lewis J. Selznick
- Starring: Roy Stewart; Leatrice Joy; Kathlyn Williams
- Cinematography: Max Dupont
- Production company: National Picture Theatres Inc.
- Distributed by: Selznick Pictures
- Release date: January 1920
- Running time: 50 minutes
- Country: United States
- Languages: Silent; English intertitles

Just a Wife is a 1920 American silent drama film directed by Howard Hickman and starring Roy Stewart, Leatrice Joy and Kathlyn Williams. It is based on the 1910 Broadway play Just a Wife by Eugene Walter.

== Cast ==
- Roy Stewart as Richard Emerson
- Leatrice Joy as Mary Virginia Lee
- Albert Van Antwerp as Robert Lee
- Kathlyn Williams as Eleanor Lathrop
- William Lion West as Tom Marvin

== Bibliography ==
- Connelly, Robert B. The Silents: Silent Feature Films, 1910-36, Volume 40, Issue 2. December Press, 1998.
- Munden, Kenneth White. The American Film Institute Catalog of Motion Pictures Produced in the United States, Part 1. University of California Press, 1997.
