= Mary Lawson's Secret =

- Directed by: John B. O'Brien
- Written by: Lloyd Lonergan
- Produced by: Edwin Thanhouser
- Starring: Charlotte Walker
- Cinematography: Harry B. Harris
- Production company: Thanhouser Company
- Distributed by: Pathé Exchange
- Release date: April 1, 1917
- Running time: 5 reels
- Country: USA
- Language: Silent...English intertitles

Mary Lawson's Secret is a lost 1917 silent dramatic film directed by John B. O'Brien and starring Charlotte Walker. The Thanhouser Film Company produced the feature with a distribution arrangement through Pathé Exchange. Walker's then husband, writer Eugene Walter, has a cameo part.

== Cast ==
- Charlotte Walker - Mary Lawson
- William B. Davidson - Dr. Brundage (*as William Davidson)
- J.H. Gilmour - Dr. Kirk
- N.Z. Wood - Joe, The Village Cobbler (as N.S. Woods)
- Inda Palmer - Mrs. Lawson, Mary's Mother
- Robert Vaughn - John Harlow
- Jean La Motte - ? (*as Gene LaMotte)
- Eugene Walter - Man in whiskers in dancing scene
