= PIF =

Pif or PIF may refer to:

== Arts, media entertainment ==
- International Puppet Festival, Zagreb, Croatia
- P.I.F. (band), a Bulgarian rock band
- Pif (television host), Italian television host named Pierfrancesco Diliberto
- Pif le chien, a French comic strip character
  - Pif gadget, a French monthly comics magazine formed around the above character
- Public information film, a series of government-commissioned short films

== Government and politics ==
- Pacific Islands Forum
- Presidential Innovation Fellows
- Punjab Irregular Force
- Liberation Front of the Slovene Nation, also known as the Anti-Imperialist Front (Slovene: Protiimperialistična fronta)
- Public Investment Fund, Saudi Arabia's sovereign wealth fund

== Science, engineering, and technology ==
- Parity Inner Failure, a type of error on a DVD
- Path integral formulation, an approach to quantum mechanics
- PCF Interframe Space
- Pingelapese language
- Powder infant formula
- Poznań International Fair
- Pressure-injected footing
- Program information file
- Prolactin inhibiting factor
- Proteolysis-inducing factor

== Other uses ==
- Paid in full (disambiguation)
- Palestine Investment Fund
- Panellinios IF
- Pargas Idrottsförening
- Partners in Flight
- Pay it forward (disambiguation)
- Pingtung Airport (IATA code: PIF)
- Pooled income fund
- Pusan International Forum (PIF)
