= No Other Woman (1933 film) =

1933 film by J. Walter Ruben

- Theatrical release poster
- Directed by: J. Walter Ruben; James Anderson (assistant)
- Written by: Wanda Tuchock; Bernard Schubert
- Based on: Just a Woman; 1916 play by Eugene Walter
- Starring: Irene Dunne; Charles Bickford; Gwili Andre; Eric Linden
- Cinematography: Edward Cronjager
- Edited by: William Hamilton
- Music by: Max Steiner
- Production company: RKO Radio Pictures
- Release date: January 6, 1933
- Running time: 58 minutes
- Country: United States
- Language: English

No Other Woman is a 1933 American pre-Code melodrama film starring Irene Dunne, and featuring Charles Bickford, Gwili Andre and Eric Linden. It was directed by J. Walter Ruben from a screenplay by Wanda Tuchock and Bernard Schubert, based on the play Just a Woman by Eugene Walter, which ran for 136 performances on Broadway in 1916, and was previously made into silent films called Just a Woman in 1918 and 1925.

== Plot ==
Anna yearns to leave from Pittsburgh, Pennsylvania and tells her boyfriend, steelworker Jim Stanley that she never will marry a steelworker, but he changes her mind. After their marriage, however, she does not abandon her dream; she puts away as much money as she can and runs a boarding house to build their savings.

When her friend Joe discovers a way to make a permanent dye out of the waste products of the steel mill, she sees her chance. Despite his initial opposition, Jim supports his wife. He tells Joe that either he can sell his invention to the mill owners or they can go into partnership and manufacture the dye themselves. Joe chooses the latter, and Jim builds the business and becomes extremely rich. Anna resides in a mansion with their young son Bobbie.

On a business trip to New York City, Jim is attracted to golddigger Margot, and they begin an affair. When Anna finds out, she confronts her husband. He says he loves Margot and wants a divorce, but Anna refuses to give him one, forcing him to take her to court.

At the trial, several bribed witnesses claim that Anna herself has a lover. Under the relentless questioning of Jim's lawyer, Bonelli, she breaks down in tears. When she learns that she will lose custody of Bobbie, Anna desperately claims that Jim is not the boy's father. This claim causes Jim to admit he paid his servants to perjure themselves, and he is sentenced to jail. While in prison, his business is destroyed by the scandal, and he is left penniless.

When he is released after a year, he is too ashamed to see his wife. He returns to work in the steel mill, but she finds him and embraces him.

== Cast ==
- Irene Dunne as Anna Stanley
- Charles Bickford as Jim Stanley
- Gwili Andre as Margot
- Eric Linden as Joe
- Christian Rub as Eli Bogavitch
- Leila Bennett as Susie
- J. Carrol Naish as Bonelli
- Buster Miles as Bobbie Stanley
- Hilda Vaughn as Governess
- Joseph E. Bernard as Butler
- Frederick Burton as Anderson
- Theodore von Eltz as Sutherland
- Edwin Stanley as Judge
- Brooks Benedict as Chauffeur

== Production ==
No Other Woman had the working titles Man and Wife and Just a Woman, the latter being the name of the play it was based and of the two silent films made from the play earlier. On the film's copyright records, Owen Francis is listed as the writer of the film story, but a news item published at the time wrote that Francis also worked on the screenplay.

== Reception ==
The critical response to the film was negative. In The New York Times, Mordaunt Hall wrote that "J. Walter Ruben's direction is un-imaginative and the script from which he had to work is dull. As the narrative comes to the screen it lacks suspense and where it might be reasonably dramatic it is hopelessly implausible." He found Dunne to be "attractive and sincere" and wrote that Bickford "struggles valiantly with his part" and that the second leads, Gwili Andre and Eric Linden, were "merely acceptable."
