= Upperworld =

1934 film

- Directed by: Roy Del Ruth
- Written by: Ben Hecht (story); Charles MacArthur (story, uncredited); Eugene Walter (story, uncredited); Ben Markson
- Produced by: Hal B. Wallis; Jack L. Warner
- Starring: Warren William; Mary Astor; Ginger Rogers
- Cinematography: Tony Gaudio
- Edited by: Owen Marks
- Music by: Bernhard Kaun
- Distributed by: Warner Bros. Pictures, Inc.
- Release date: April 28, 1934
- Running time: 70-73 minutes
- Country: United States
- Language: English

Upperworld is a 1934 American pre-Code drama film directed by Roy Del Ruth and starring Warren William as a wealthy married railroad tycoon whose friendship with a showgirl, played by Ginger Rogers, leads to blackmail and murder. Upperworld is one of the last films released before the strict enforcement of the Hollywood Production Code by Joseph I. Breen, which began on July 1, 1934.

== Plot ==
Alexander Stream is a multimillionaire. While he is devoted to his wife, Hettie and son, Tommy, she is too busy playing attending and throwing society functions to pay much attention to her husband. While out in his yacht, a young woman, Lilly Linda, is spotted drowning in the ocean. The crew bring her aboard, and Stream loans her some of his clothes.

He gives her a ride home in his limousine and she invites him to come in so she can give the clothes back to him. To thank him, she offers to make him breakfast and he ends up skipping all of his morning appointments to have breakfast with her. On the way to his appointments, his car is stopped for speeding by Officer Moran, an incorruptible law-and-order beat cop. Alex pulls some strings and gets Moran demoted.

When Alex gets back home, his wife is in the middle of throwing a large costume party. She asks him to come to the party, and Alex tells her that he misses spending time alone with her. Hettie replies that maintaining her social position is as important to her as his career is to him. Alex declines putting in an appearance at the party and instead plays with Tommy.

The next day, he makes dinner reservations at an expensive restaurant and special arrangements for a cake for his and Hattie's 14th wedding anniversary. When he calls Hettie to invite her to meet him in the city for dinner, she tells him she has other dinner plans already. As his driver is taking him home, Alex sees a picture of Linda, showing she is headlining a burlesque show. Afterwards, he stops backstage to invite her to share the anniversary dinner with him. At dinner she realizes that he asked her because his wife was not able to come.

After an innocent dinner, Oscar, his driver brings him home and he and Alex discuss that neither of them will tell anyone about his dinner with Lilly. The next morning, he wakes up and finds that his wife has made arrangements to send Tommy to a sleep-away summer camp 200 miles away. He expresses his displeasure but Hettie reminds him that it is necessary for their social position. After Tommy leaves, Hettie tells Alex that she is going away for two weeks with some of her society friends. Alex makes another date with Lilly to go for a ride in his airplane. In the meantime, Lilly's manager and boyfriend, Louie Colima is encouraging her to have an affair with Alex so the two of them can blackmail him. After a minor accident, Lilly and Alex kiss.

A few months later, Alex has installed Lilly in a luxury apartment and purchases a $12,000 diamond bracelet for her birthday. On the way to dinner, Hettie finds the gift box while straightening Alex's tie and assumes it is for her. In the meantime, Louie tells Lilly that it is time to blackmail Alex and breaks open her bedroom door and slaps her to the ground when she refuses to give him the letters. He picks up a gun that Lilly pointed at him and tosses it in a chair on his way to the door. At the door he comes face to face with Alex who tells him that he and Lilly were planning to blackmail him all along. Lilly comes into the room and is clearly upset because she is sincerely in love with him. Alex demands that Lou give him the letters and in the ensuing tussle, Lou fires his gun at Alex but kills Lilly instead. When his gun jams, Alex picks up the gun Lou tossed in the chair and kills him. He makes the shootings look like a murder-suicide and erases evidence that he was there.

When he gets home, Hettie is waiting for him to tell him that not only is she bringing Tommy home from military school but that she realizes that she has been ignoring him and wants to spend more time together.

Unbeknownst to Alex, Moran, now walking the beat, saw his car parked illegally in front of Lilly's building and watched him drive away. While everyone else is saying it's a murder suicide, Moran puts the pieces together and believes that someone else committed the murders. When the murders become front-page news, Alex goes to the building and pays off the maintenance man to say that he never saw him come to the building. By this point, Moran is suspicious that Alex is the killer so he contrives to get Alex's fingerprints to compare them against the fingerprints found in the apartment. When he brings this to the detectives, he finds out that they have been paid off. He causes a scene in the office and the chief of detectives has him taken to jail. The reporters follow him to the jail cell because he has been yelling that Alex is involved with the murder.

Several reporters show up with a fingerprint technician at Alex's house where he is having a large party to announce his acquisition of another railroad company. When they come in, they demand that he give them his fingerprints to clear his name. When he can't find a way out of it, Alex submits his prints knowing they will match prints found in Lilly's apartment. After giving his fingerprints, he returns to the party. The technician has compared the fingerprints while waiting in the hallway and when they match, the policemen who accompanied them arrest him for murder. When the press crashes through the door asking him for a statement, Alex tells the assembled company that he is being arrested and charged with murder.

While waiting for the verdict to come back, he is summoned to the judge's chambers and finds that Hettie and Tommy are there. Hettie tells him that they are leaving for Europe the next day and she wanted to give him a chance to say goodbye to Tommy. She tells him that she could forgive him if it weren't for the affair. He responds by telling her that he was very lonely. He tells Hettie that while he was fond of Lilly, he still loves Hettie and her constant unavailability made him lonely enough to reach out to someone else for the attention he wasn't getting at home. He returns to the courtroom where the jury verdict is beginning to be read.

The scene cuts to a ship. Tommy is talking to Oscar about traveling to England. The camera draws back to show Alex sitting next to Hettie on the deck. Alex was acquitted. This trip is a second honeymoon, and the two of them vow to always take time for each other and their marriage.

== Cast ==
- Warren William as Alexander Stream
- Mary Astor as Mrs. Hettie Stream
- Ginger Rogers as Lilly
- Andy Devine as Oscar
- Dickie Moore as Tommy Stream
- Ferdinand Gottschalk as Marcus
- J. Carroll Naish as Lou
- Sidney Toler as Moran
- Henry O'Neill as Banker
- Theodore Newton as Rocklen
- Robert Barrat as Commissioner Clark
- Robert Greig as Butler
- Frank Sheridan as Inspector Kellogg
- John Qualen as Chris
- Willard Robertson as Captain Reynolds
