= Camilla Dalberg =

German-American stage and silent film actress (1870-1968)

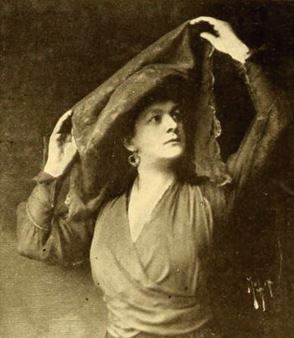
Photograph of Camilla Dalberg as Bianca in The Great Lover. The picture appeared in the magazine The Moving Picture World in January of 1919.

Camilla Dalberg (1870–1968) was a German-American actress and writer known for her roles as Mrs. Clare in Tess of the D'Urbervilles (1913) and Mother in The Seven Sisters (1915), as well as numerous other stage and film roles throughout the 1910s and 1920s. Dalberg also wrote and starred in the short film After Many Days (1912).

== Life ==
Dalberg was born in Frankfurt, Germany on June 28, 1870 and was married to fellow actor Charles Kraus, with whom she appeared in The Seven Sisters (1915). Dalberg died in The Bronx, New York in February 1968. She was 97 years old.

== Filmography ==
Title	Role	Year	Director	Additional Sources
The Chamber Mystery	Mrs. West	1920	Abraham Schomer	
Just a Woman		1918	Julius Steger	
Draft 258	Marcita Blein	1917	Christy Cabanne	
Should a Baby Die?		1916	Perry N. Vekroff	
One Million Dollars	Mrs. Cookie	1915	John W. Noble	
The Woman Next Door	Mrs. Grayson	1915	Walter Edwin	
The Seven Sisters	Mother	1915	Sidney Olcott	
Love and Money	A Wealthy Widow	1915	Carroll Fleming	
One of Our Girls	Mme. Fonblaque	1914	Thomas N. Heffron	
The Brute	Mrs. Pope	1914	Thomas N. Heffron	
In the Bishop's Carriage	The Actress	1913	J. Searle Dawley, Edwin S. Porter	
Tess of the D'Urbervilles	Mrs. Clare	1913	J. Searle Dawley	
A Chase Across the Continent	Mrs. Worthington-The Aunt	1912	J. Searle Dawley	
After Many Days	Anton's Daughter	1912		
How Sir Andrew Lost His Vote	The Hostess	1911	Ashley Miller	
The Heart of Nichette	Mlle. Nichette	1911	Ashley Miller	

== Stage roles ==
Title	Role	Opening Date	Additional Sources
These Modern Women	Marie Louise	February 13, 1928	
The Garden of Eden	Madame Rimsky	September 27, 1927	
Money From Home	Nannie Bauer	February 28, 1927	
Hurricane	Martha Olczewski (Deeney)	December 25, 1923	
Pride	Mrs. Bohn	May 2, 1923	
Buddies	Madam Benoit	October 27, 1919	
The Woman on the Index	Performer	August 29, 1918	
The Great Lover	Bianca Souio	November 10, 1915	
The Joy of Living	Countess Beata		
La Main			
