= The Devil's Needle =

1916 film by Chester Withey

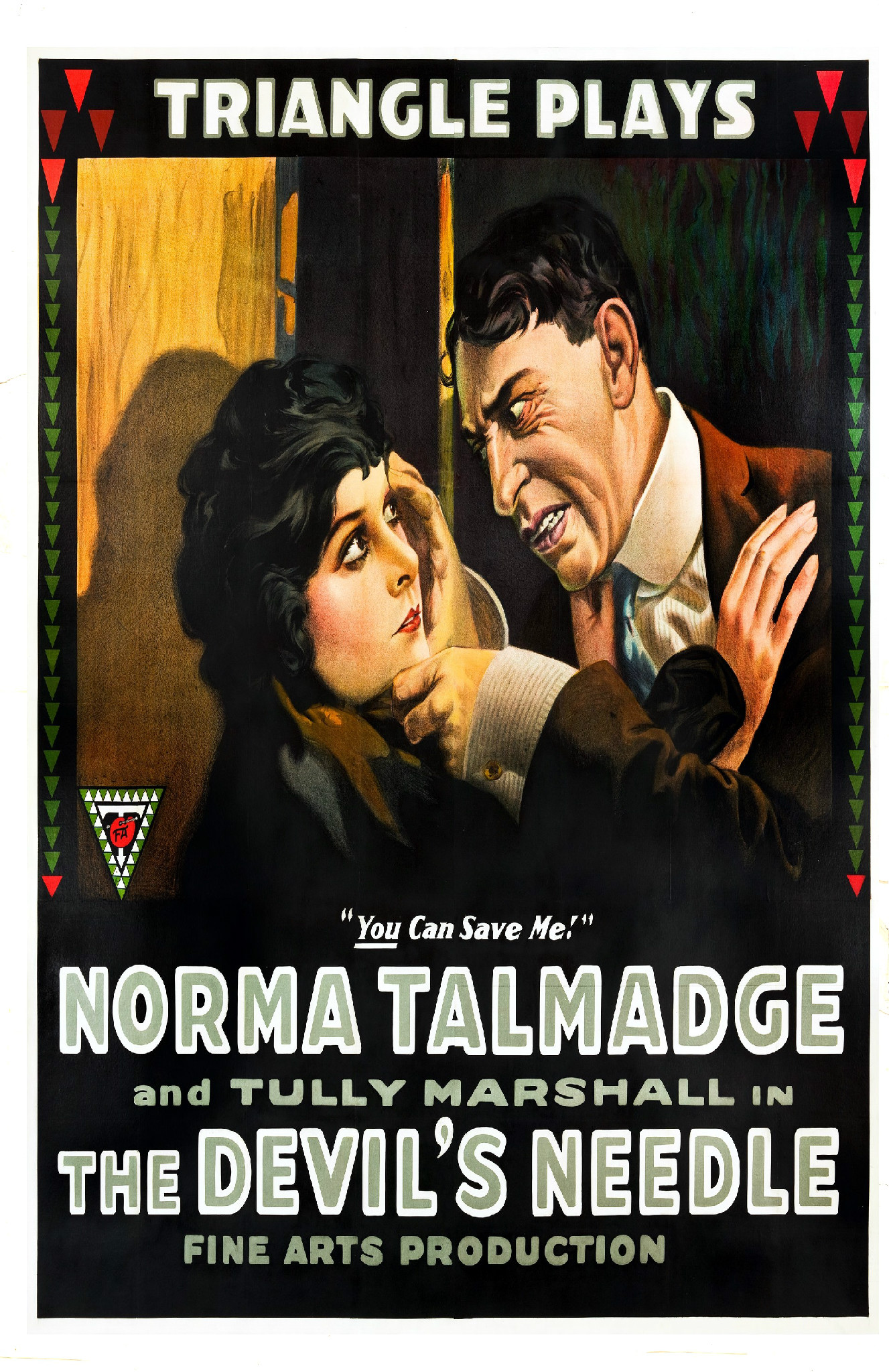
- Directed by: Chester Withey
- Written by: Chester Withey
- Produced by: Fine Arts Film
- Starring: Norma Talmadge; Tully Marshall
- Distributed by: Triangle Films
- Release date: August 13, 1916
- Running time: 59 minutes
- Country: USA
- Language: Silent ...English titles

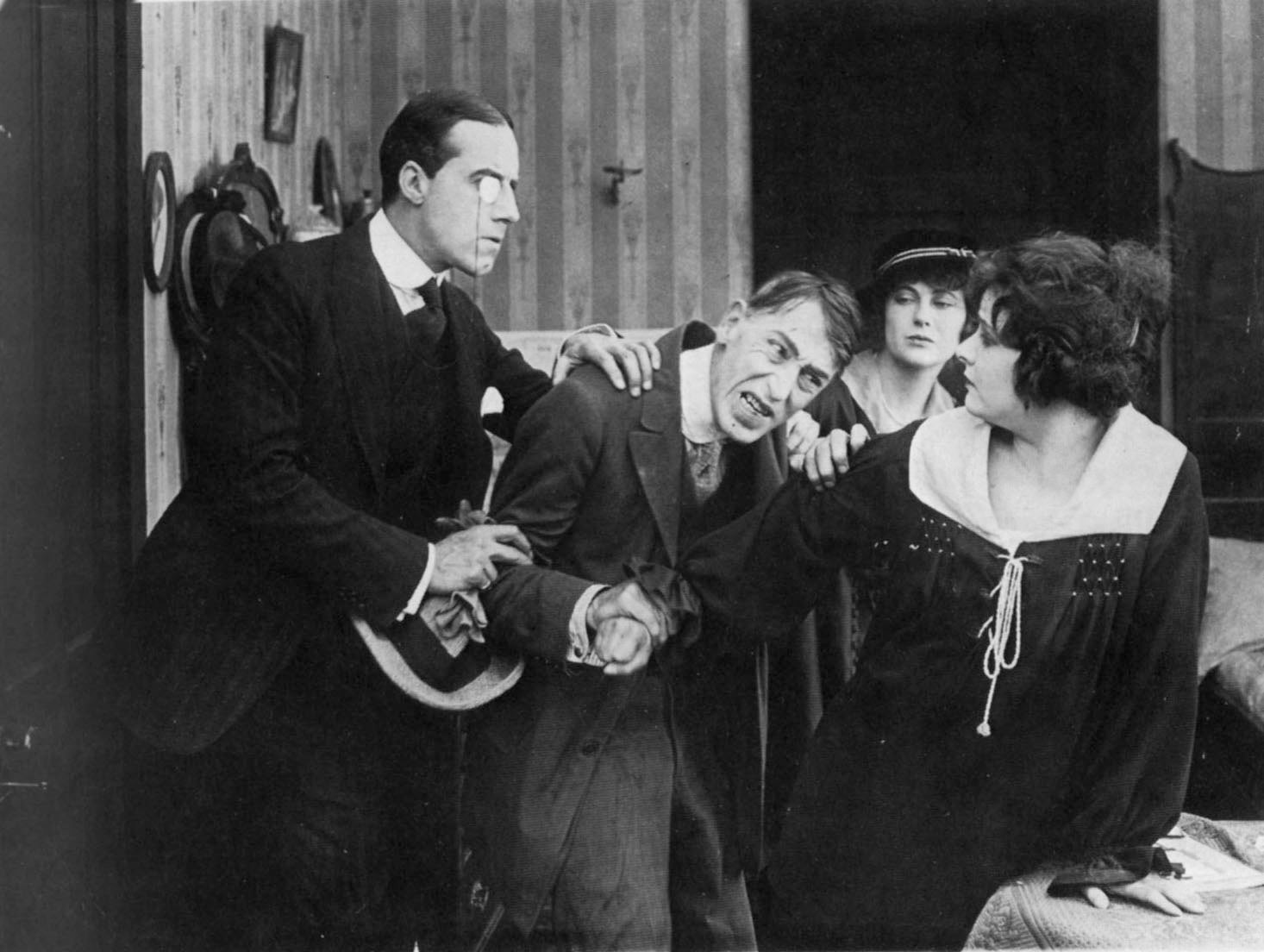
The Devil's Needle (1916) with Howard Gaye, Tully Marshall, Norma Talmadge and Marguerite Marsh

The Devil's Needle is a 1916 silent film drama directed by Chester Withey and starring Norma Talmadge and Tully Marshall. It was produced by D. W. Griffith's Fine Arts Film Company and distributed by Triangle Films.

A 1923 rerelease print survives at the Library of Congress.

== Cast ==
- Norma Talmadge as Rene, His Model
- Tully Marshall as David White
- Marguerite Marsh as Wynne Mortimer
- F. A. Turner as William Mortimer
- Howard Gaye as Hugh Gordon
- John Brennan as Fritz
- Paul Le Blanc as Buck
