= Tully Marshall =

American actor (1864–1943)

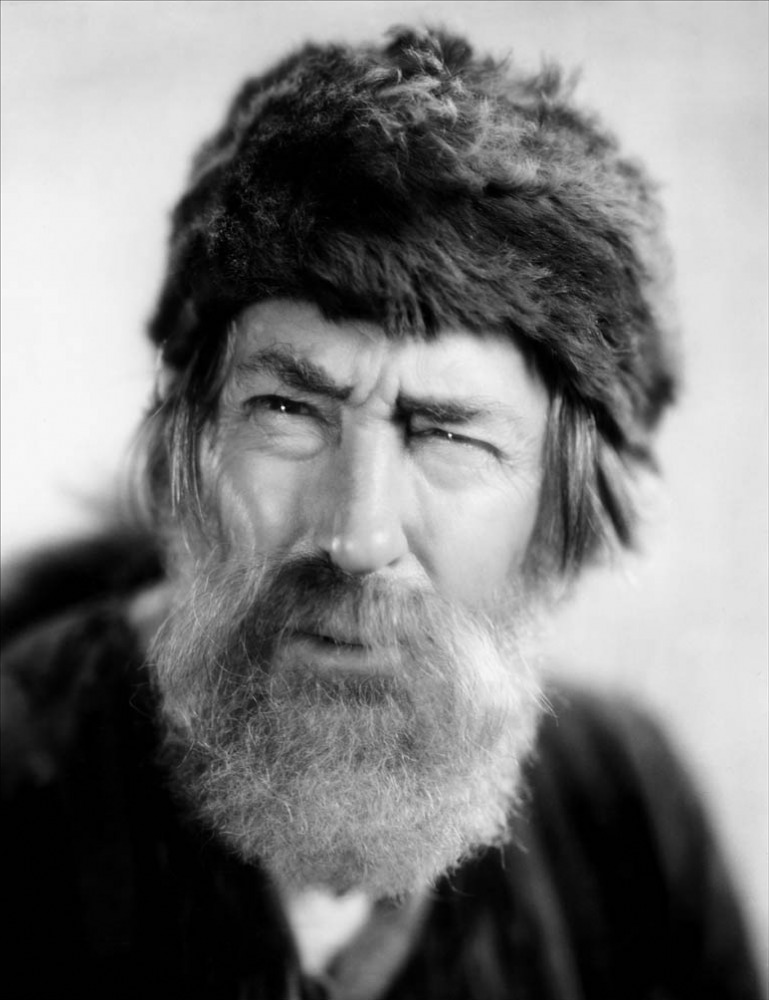
- Marshall in Fighting Caravans (1931)
- Born: William Phillips; April 10, 1864; Nevada City, California, U.S.
- Died: March 10, 1943 (aged 78); Encino, California, U.S.
- Resting place: Hollywood Forever Cemetery
- Education: Santa Clara University
- Occupation: Actor
- Years active: 1883–1943
- Spouse: Marion Fairfax (m. 1899)

Tully Marshall (born William Phillips; April 10, 1864 – March 10, 1943) was an American character actor. He had nearly a quarter century of theatrical experience before his debut film appearance in 1914 which led to a film career spanning almost three decades.

== Early years ==
Marshall was born in Nevada City, California. He attended private schools and Santa Clara College, from which he graduated with an engineering degree.

== Stage ==
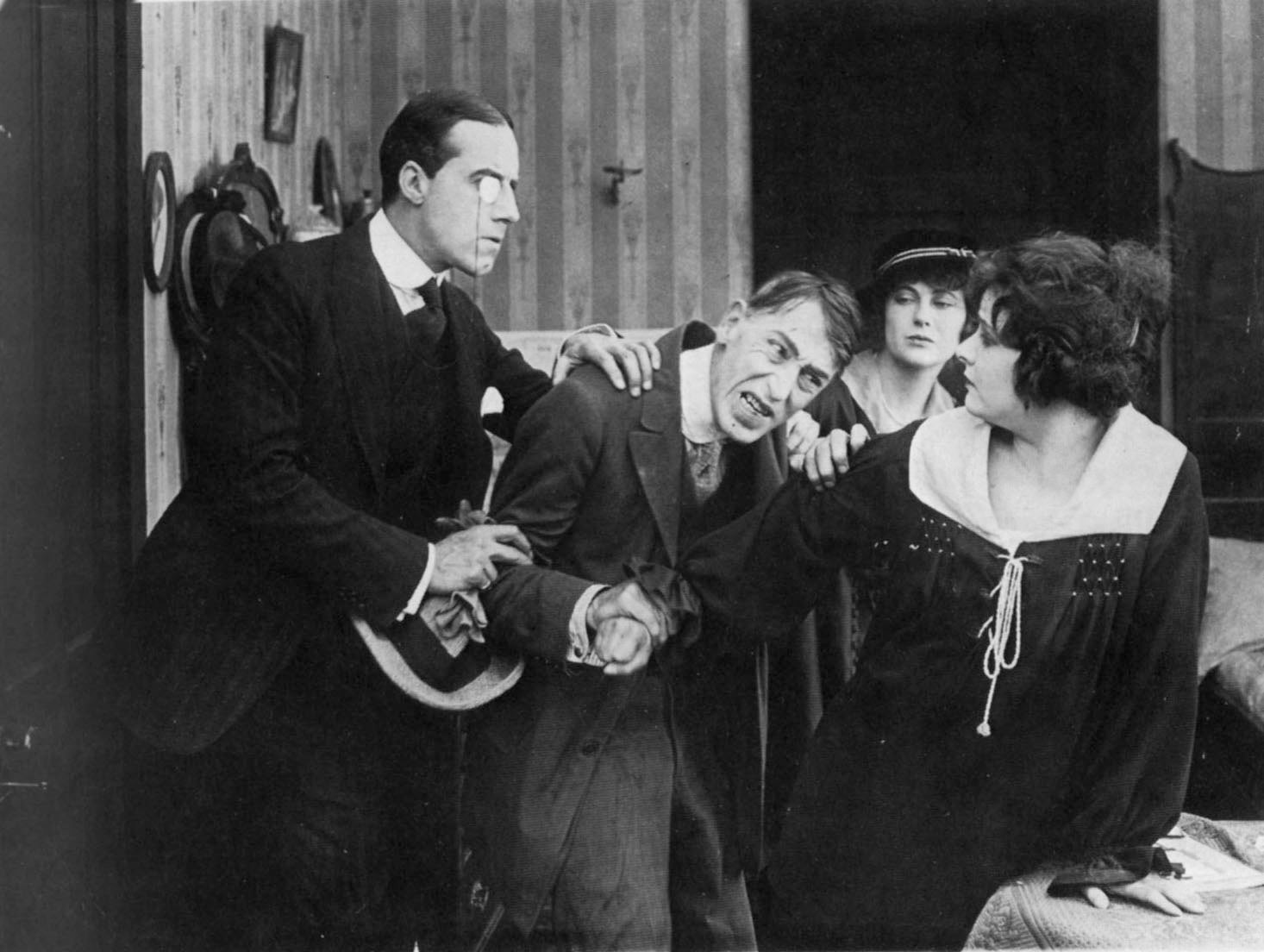
The Devil's Needle (1916) with Howard Gaye, Tully Marshall, Norma Talmadge and Marguerite Marsh

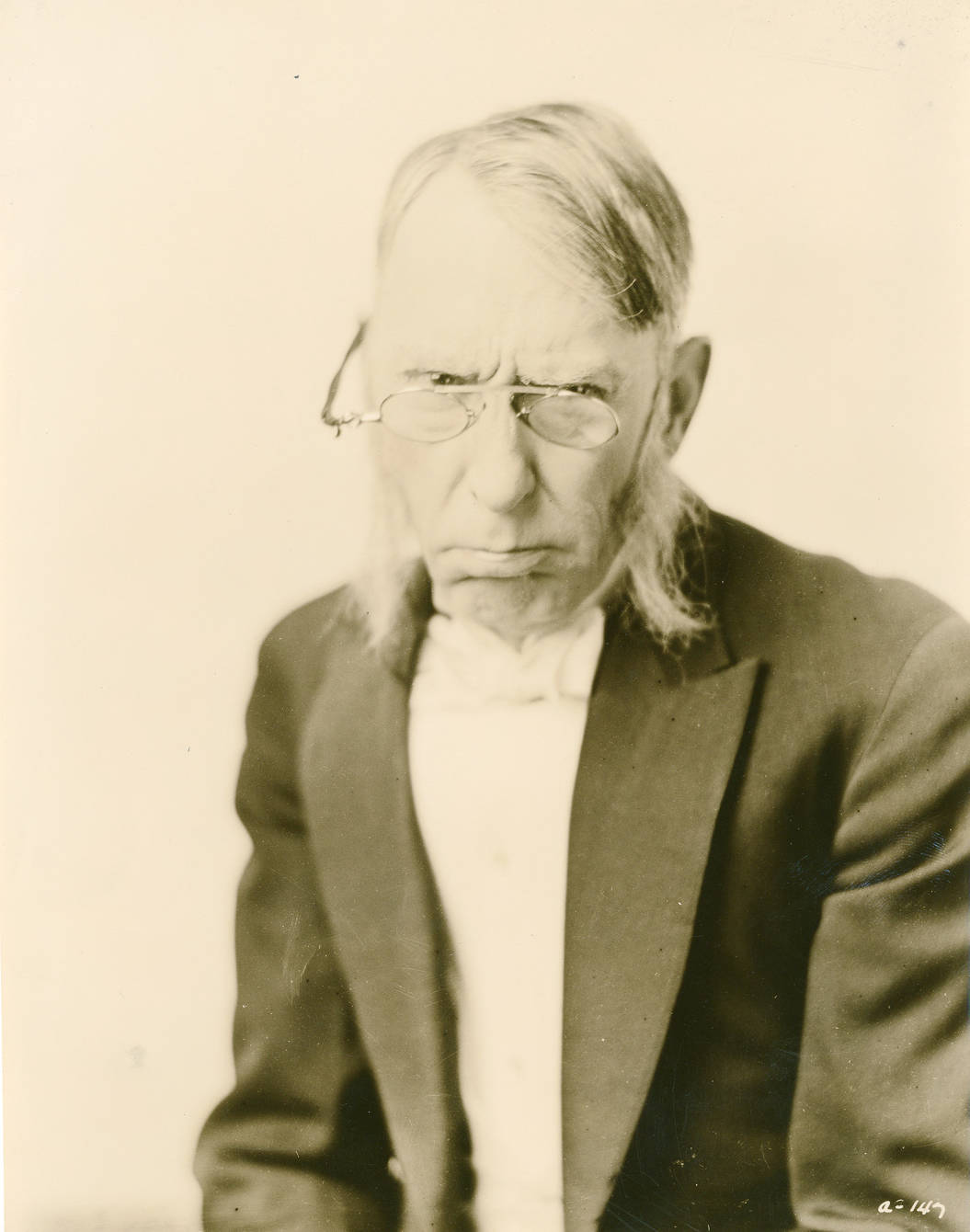
Marshall in 1923

Marshall began acting on the stage at 18, appearing in Saratoga at the Winter Garden in San Francisco on March 8, 1883. He played a wide variety of roles on Broadway from 1887. His Broadway credits include The Clever Ones (1914).

For several years, Marshall played with a variety of stock theater troupes, including both acting and being stage manager for E. H. Sothern's company.

== Film ==
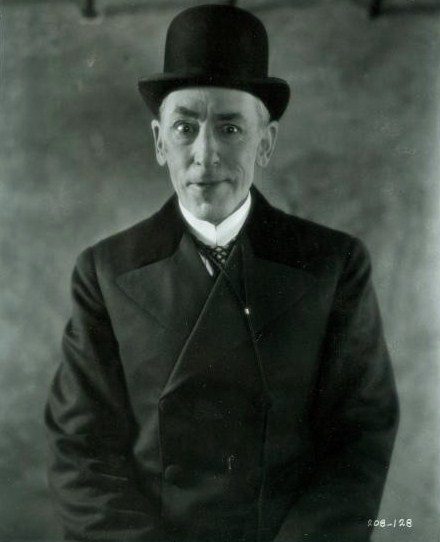
Marshall in The Merry Widow (1925)

In 1914, Marshall arrived in Hollywood. His screen debut was in Paid in Full (1914). By the time D. W. Griffith cast him as the High Priest of Bel in Intolerance (1916), he had already appeared in a number of silent films.

His career continued to thrive during the sound era and he remained busy for the remaining three decades of his life. He played a vast array of drunken trail scouts, lovable grandpas, unforgiving fathers, sinister attorneys and lecherous aristocrats. He is arguably most widely known today for his portrayal of John Wayne's sidekick in the lavish widescreen epic Western The Big Trail (1930) directed by Raoul Walsh, shot on location all across the American West, and starring Wayne in his first leading role. In one of Marshall's last films, This Gun for Hire (1942) starring Alan Ladd, he played a treacherously sinister nitrogen industrialist.

== Personal life ==
Marshall was married to screenwriter, playwright, actress and head of her own studio Marion Fairfax from 1899 to his death in 1943. Fairfax died in 1970 at age 94.

== Death ==
Marshall died on March 10, 1943, age 78, after a heart attack at his home in Encino, California. His grave is located in Hollywood Forever Cemetery.

== Filmography ==
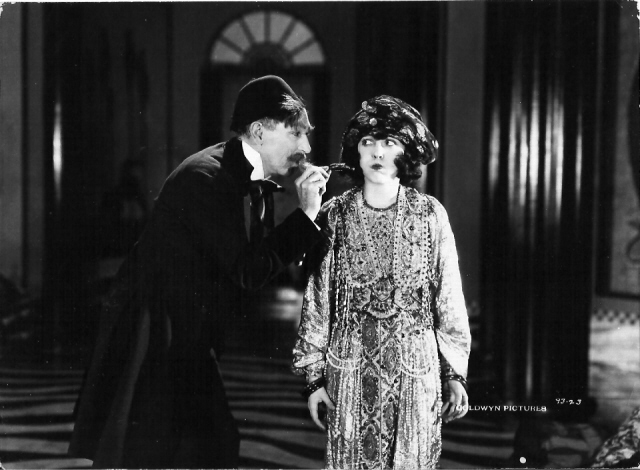
Marshall and Mabel Normand in The Slim Princess (1920)

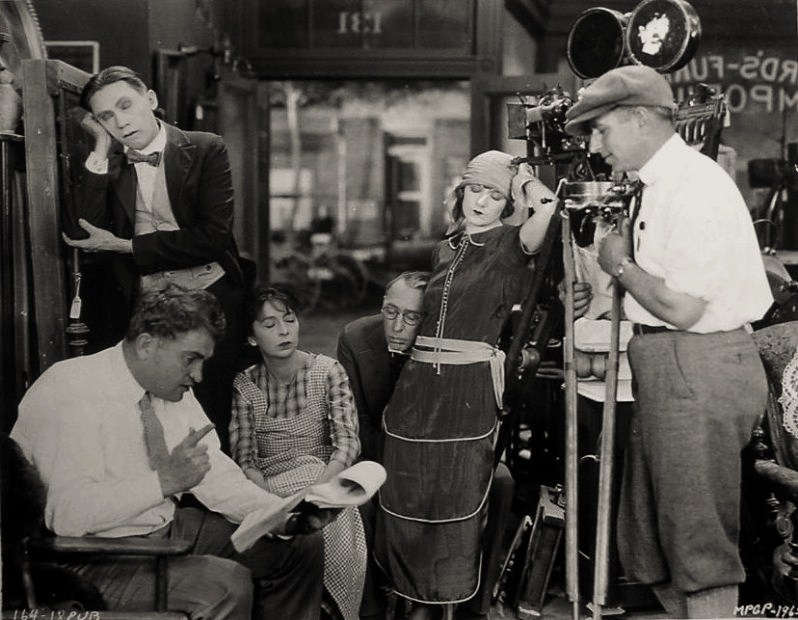
Marshall (4th from left) in Along Came Ruth (1924)

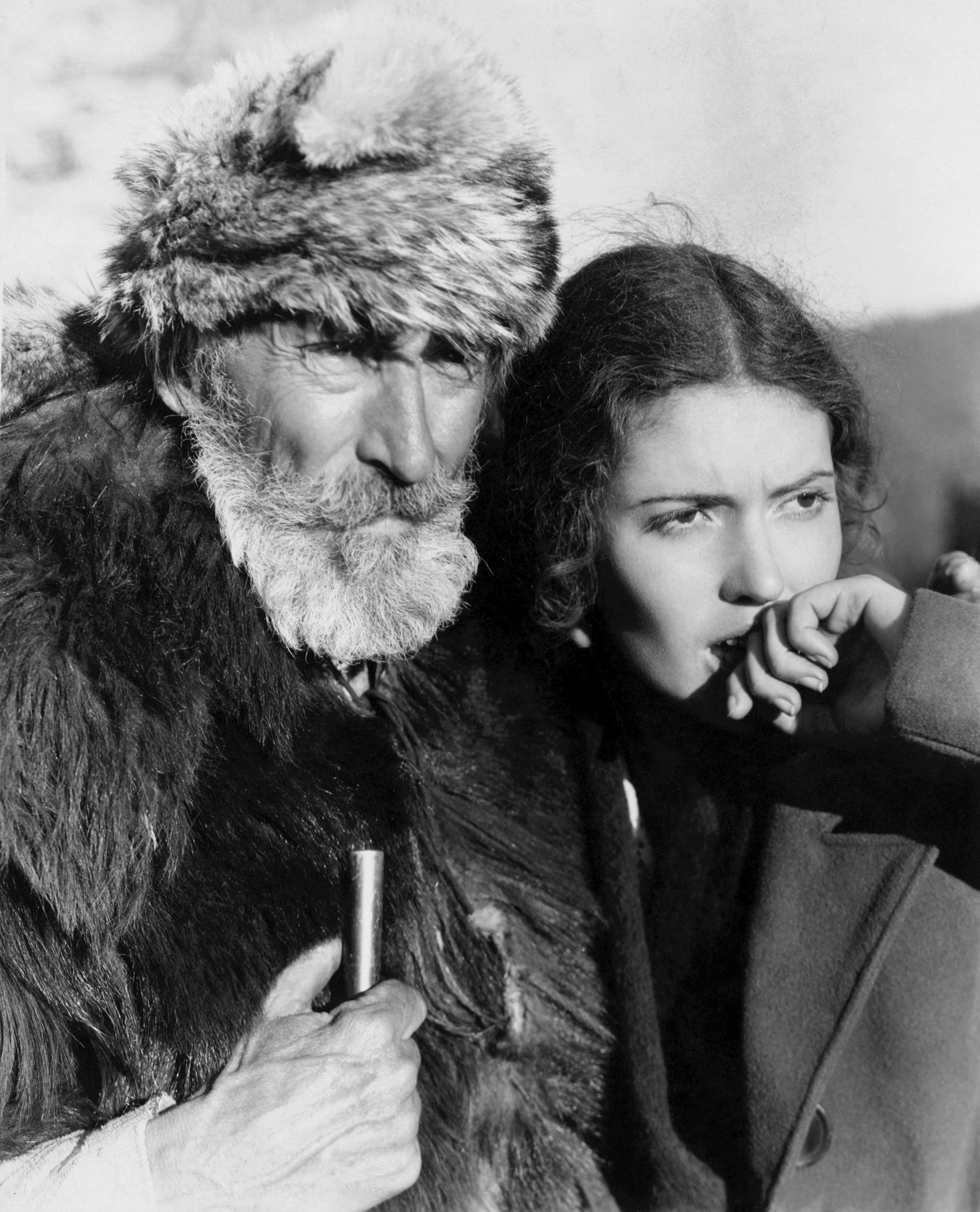
Marshall and Marguerite Churchill in The Big Trail (1930)

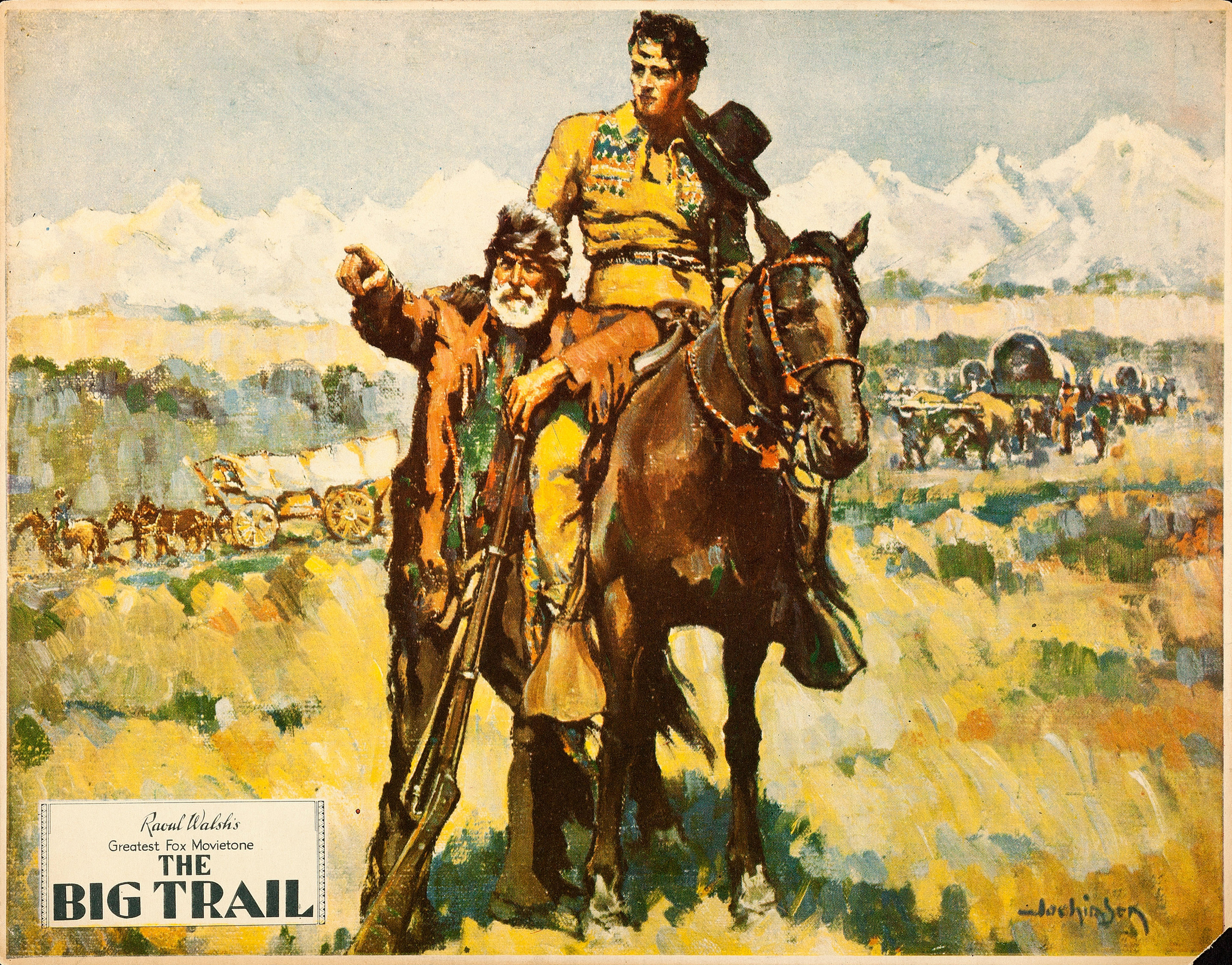
Lobby card with Marshall and John Wayne in The Big Trail (1930)

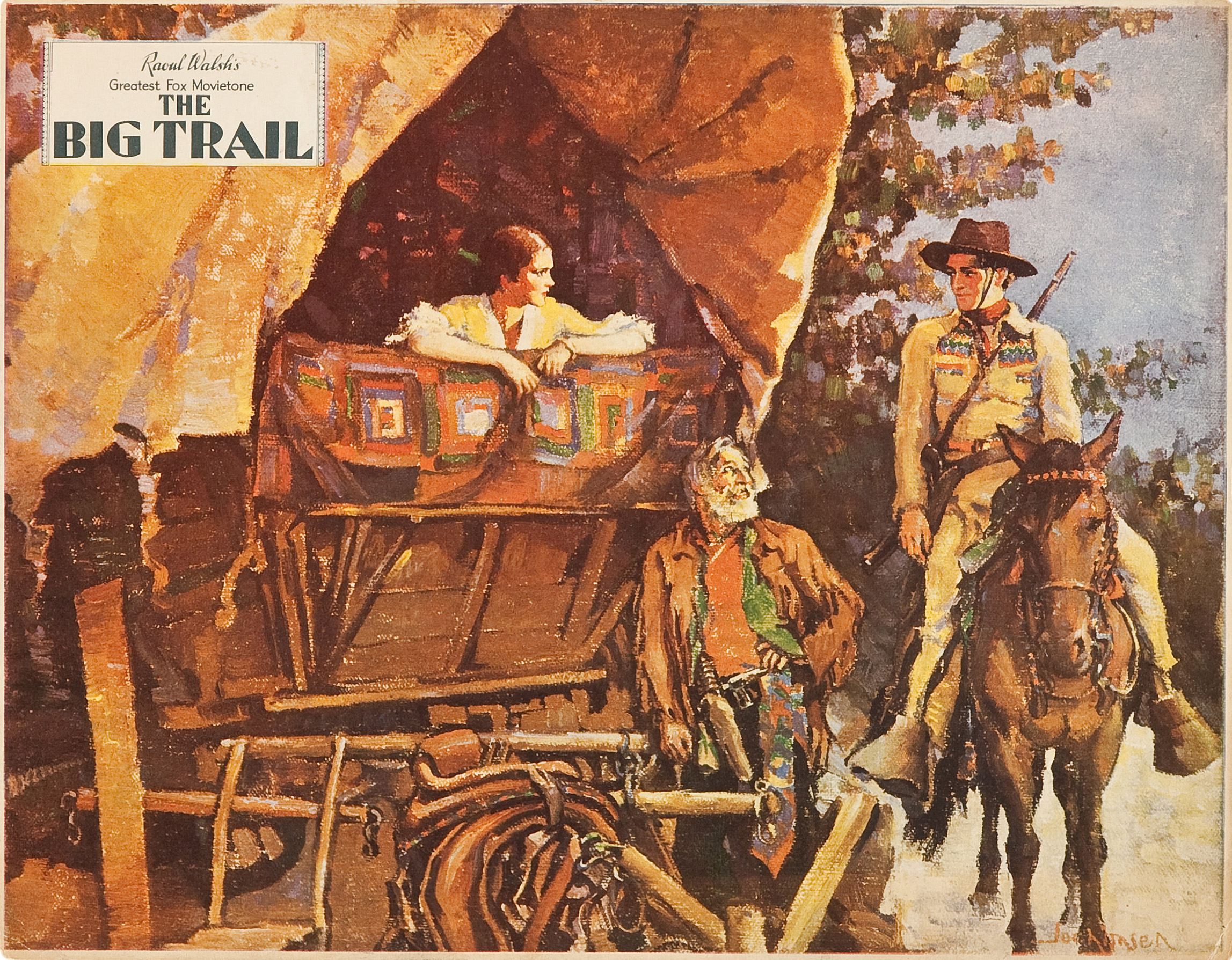
Lobby card with Marguerite Churchill, Marshall and John Wayne in The Big Trail (1930)

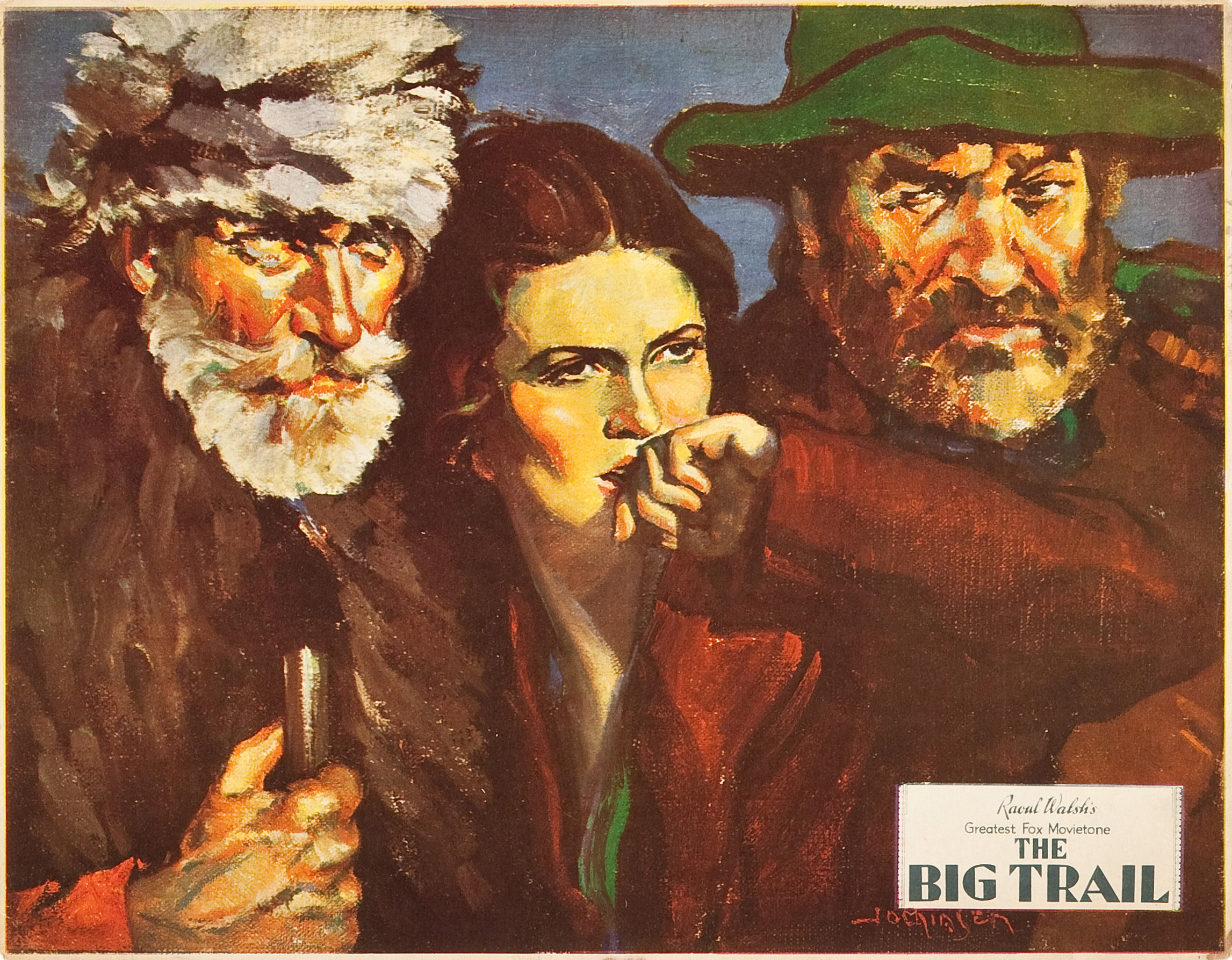
Lobby card with Marshall, Marguerite Churchill and Tyrone Power Sr. in The Big Trail (1930)

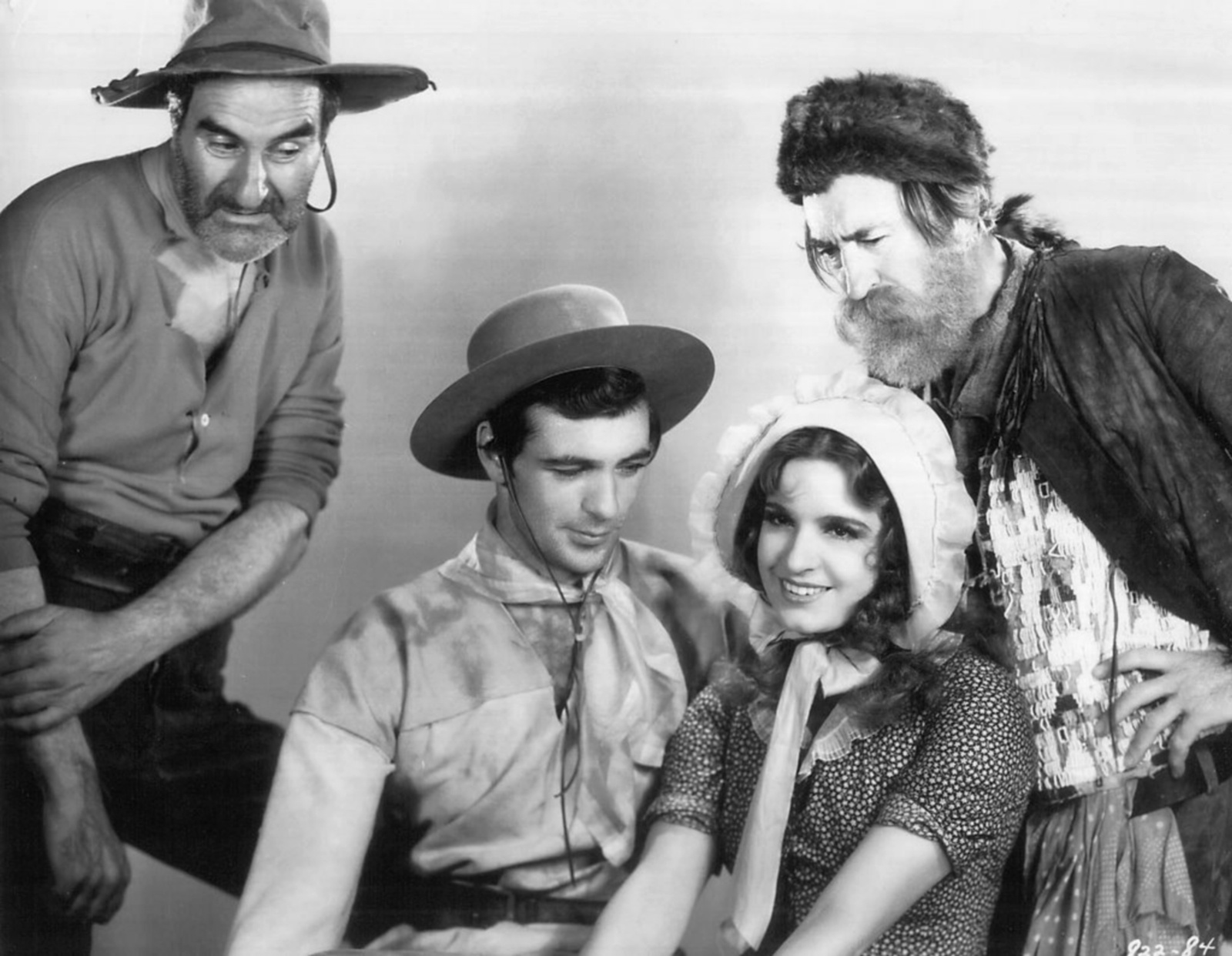
Ernest Torrence, Gary Cooper, Lili Damita, and Marshall in Fighting Caravans (1931)

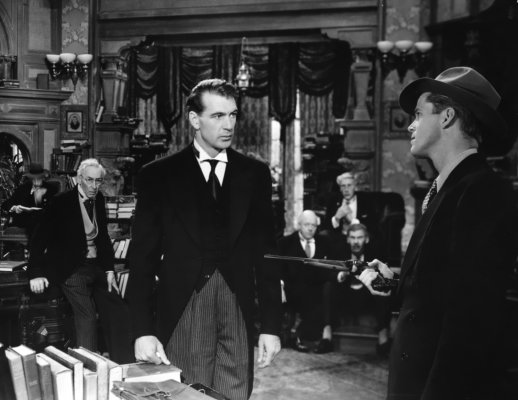
Marshall, Gary Cooper and Dan Duryea in Ball of Fire (1941)

- Paid in Full (1914) – Joe Brooks
- The Sable Lorcha (1915) – Soy
- The Painted Soul (1915)
- Let Katie Do It (1916) – Oliver Putnam
- Martha's Vindication (1916) – Sell Hawkins
- A Child of the Paris Streets (1916) – Jacques Dufrane
- The Devil's Needle (1916) – John Minturn
- Intolerance (1916) – High Priest of Bel / Friend of the Musketeer
- Oliver Twist (1916) – Fagin
- Joan the Woman (1916) – L'Oiseleur
- The Fatal Glass of Beer (1916) – Cousin Henry
- Everybody's Doing It (1916) – Crook
- The Golden Fetter (1917) – Henry Slade
- A Romance of the Redwoods (1917) – Sam Sparks
- Unconquered (1917) – Juke
- The Countess Charming (1917) – Dr. John Cavendish
- The Devil-Stone (1917) – Silas Martin
- A Modern Musketeer (1917) – James Brown
- The Things We Love (1918) – Henry D. Kenwood
- The Whispering Chorus (1918) – F.P. Clumley
- M'Liss (1918) – Judge Joshua McSnagley
- Old Wives for New (1918) – Simcox
- We Can't Have Everything (1918) – The Director
- Bound in Morocco (1918) – Ali Pah Shush
- The Man from Funeral Range (1918) – Frank Beekman
- Too Many Millions (1918) – Artemus Wilkins
- Arizona (1918) – Unknown role
- The Squaw Man (1918) – Sir John Applegate
- Cheating Cheaters (1919) – Ira Lazarre
- Maggie Pepper (1919) – Sam Darkin
- The Girl Who Stayed at Home (1919) – Cutie's Old Friend
- Daughter of Mine (1919) – Pap Mendelsohn / Lord Noblebrow
- The Lady of Red Butte (1919) – Spanish Ed
- The Crimson Gardenia (1919) – Alfred le Duc
- The Grim Game (1919) – Richard Raver
- Her Kingdom of Dreams (1919) – Langley
- The Lottery Man (1919) – Unknown role
- The Life Line (1919) – Joe Heckett
- Hawthorne of the U.S.A. (1919) – Nitchi
- Everywoman (1919) – Puff
- Double Speed (1920) – Donald McPherson
- Excuse My Dust (1920) – President Mutchler
- The Gift Supreme (1920) – Irving Stagg
- The Dancin' Fool (1920) – Charle Harkins
- Sick Abed (1920) – Chalmers
- The Slim Princess (1920) – Papova
- Honest Hutch (1920) – Thomas Gunnison
- Her Beloved Villain (1920) – Dr. Joseph Poulard
- The Little 'Fraid Lady (1920) – Giron
- What Happened to Rosa (1920) – Percy Peacock
- The Cup of Life (1921) – Chan Chang
- Silent Years (1921) – Captain Longville
- Hail the Woman (1921) – 'Odd Jobs Man'
- Lotus Blossom (1921) – Quong Foo
- Any Night (1922) – Jerry Maguire (The Weasel)
- Penrod (1922) – Mr. Schofield
- The Lying Truth (1922) – Horace Todd
- Too Much Business (1922) – Amos Comby
- Is Matrimony a Failure? (1922) – Amos Saxby
- The Ladder Jinx (1922) – Peter Stalton
- Fools of Fortune (1922) – Scenery Sims
- Without Compromise (1922) – Samuel McAllister
- The Village Blacksmith (1922) – Squire Ezra Brigham
- Good Men and True (1922) – Fite
- The Super-Sex (1922) – Mr. Higgins
- Deserted at the Altar (1922) – Squire Simpson
- Only a Shop Girl (1922) – Watkins' Store Manager
- The Marriage Chance (1922) – Timothy Lamb
- The Beautiful and Damned (1922) – Adam Patch
- Dangerous Trails (1923) – Steve Bradley
- The Covered Wagon (1923) – Jim Bridger
- Fools and Riches (1923) – John Dorgan
- Law of the Lawless (1923) – Ali Mechmet
- Temporary Marriage (1923) – Hugh Manners, a lawyer
- The Brass Bottle (1923) – Professor Hamilton
- Broken Hearts of Broadway (1923) – Barney Ryan
- The Barefoot Boy (1923) – Tom Adams
- His Last Race (1923) – Mr. Strong
- The Hunchback of Notre Dame (1923) – El Rey Luis XI
- Defying Destiny (1923) – Dr. Gregory
- Thundergate (1923) – Suen Tung
- Richard the Lion-Hearted (1923) – Archbishop of Tyre
- The Meanest Man in the World (1923) – Client
- Ponjola (1923) – Count Blauhimel
- The Dangerous Maid (1923) – Simon (the peddler)
- Let's Go (1923) – Ezra Sprowl
- Her Temporary Husband (1923) – John Ingram
- The Stranger (1924) – The Stranger
- Pagan Passions (1924) – Dr. Trask
- The Right of the Strongest (1924) – 'Mister' Sykes
- Hold Your Breath (1924) – Blake
- For Sale (1924) – Harrison Bates
- Passion's Pathway (1924) – Butler
- Along Came Ruth (1924) – Israel Hubbard
- Reckless Romance (1924) – Judge Somers
- He Who Gets Slapped (1924) – Count Mancini
- The Ridin' Kid from Powder River (1924) – The Spider
- Smouldering Fires (1925) – Scotty
- The Talker (1925) – Henry Fells
- Anything Once (1925) – Mr. Nixon
- The Half-Way Girl (1925) – The Crab
- The Merry Widow (1925) – Baron Sadoja
- The Pace That Thrills (1925) – Hezekiah Sims
- Clothes Make the Pirate (1925) – Scute
- Torrent (1926) – Don Andrés
- Old Loves and New (1926) – Hosein
- Her Big Night (1926) – J.Q. Adams, reporter
- Twinkletoes (1926) – Dad Minasi
- Jim, the Conqueror (1926) – Dave Mahler
- Beware of Widows (1927) – Peter Chadwick
- The Cat and the Canary (1927) – Roger Crosby
- The Gorilla (1927) – William Townsend
- Drums of Love (1928) – Bopi
- Mad Hour (1928) – Lawyer
- The Trail of '98 (1928) – Salvation Jim
- The Perfect Crime (1928) – Frisbie
- Alias Jimmy Valentine (1928) – Avery
- Conquest (1928) – Dr. Gerry
- Queen Kelly (1929) – Jan Vryheid (uncredited)
- Redskin (1929) – Navajo Jim
- The Bridge of San Luis Rey (1929) – A Townsman
- Thunderbolt (1929) – Warden
- The Mysterious Dr. Fu Manchu (1929) – Chinese Ambassador (uncredited)
- Skin Deep (1929) – Dr. Bruce Langdon
- The Show of Shows (1929) – Performer in "The Pirate"/Soldier (segment "Rifle Execution")
- Tiger Rose (1929) – Hector McCollins
- Burning Up (1930) – Dave Gentry
- She Couldn't Say No (1930) – Big John
- Mammy (1930) – Slats
- Under a Texas Moon (1930) – Gus Aldrich
- Redemption (1930) – Artimiev
- Murder Will Out (1930) – Dr. Mansfield
- Numbered Men (1930) – Lemuel Barnes
- Dancing Sweeties (1930) – Pa Cleaver
- Common Clay (1930) – W.H. Yates
- The Big Trail (1930) – Zeke
- One Night at Susie's (1930) – Buckeye Bill
- Tom Sawyer (1930) – Muff Potter
- Fighting Caravans (1931) – Jim Bridger
- The Virtuous Husband (1931) – Ezra Hunniwell
- The Millionaire (1931) – Briggs
- The Unholy Garden (1931) – Baron de Jonghe
- Broken Lullaby (1932) – Gravedigger (uncredited)
- The Hatchet Man (1932) – Long Sen Yat
- The Beast of the City (1932) – Michaels
- Arséne Lupin (1932) – Gaston Gourney-Martin
- Scarface (1932) – Managing Editor
- Scandal for Sale (1932) – Simpkins
- Grand Hotel (1932) – Gerstenkorn
- Night Court (1932) – Grogan
- Strangers of the Evening (1932) – Robert Daniels
- Two-Fisted Law (1932) – Sheriff Malcolm
- The Hurricane Express (1932, 12-part serial) – Howard Edwards
- The Hollywood Handicap (1932, Short) – Minor Role
- Exposure (1932) – John Ward
- Klondike (1932) – Editor Hinman
- The Cabin in the Cotton (1932) – Slick
- Red Dust (1932) – "Mac" McQuarg, overseer
- Afraid to Talk (1932) – District Attorney. Anderson
- Night of Terror (1933) – Richard Rinehart
- Corruption (1933) – Gorman
- Fighting with Kit Carson (1933) – Jim Bridge [Chs. 1–2]
- Laughing at Life (1933) – Stone
- Massacre (1934) – Jake
- Murder on the Blackboard (1934) – Mr. MacFarland
- Black Fury (1935) – Poole
- Diamond Jim (1935) – Minister
- A Tale of Two Cities (1935) – Woodcutter
- California Straight Ahead! (1937) – Harrison
- Souls at Sea (1937) – Pecora
- She Asked for It (1937) – Old Man Stettin
- Stand-In (1937) – Fowler Pettypacker
- That Navy Spirit (1937) – The 'Admiral'
- Mr. Boggs Steps Out (1938) – Morton Ross
- A Yank at Oxford (1938) – Cephas
- Arsène Lupin Returns (1938) – Monelle
- Making the Headlines (1938) – Stuart Hackett
- College Swing (1938) – Grandpa Alden (uncredited)
- Hold That Kiss (1938) – Mr. Lazarus – Travel Customer (uncredited)
- The Kid from Texas (1939) – Adam Lambert
- Blue Montana Skies (1939) – Steve
- Invisible Stripes (1939) – Old Peter
- Brigham Young (1940) – Judge
- Youth Will Be Served (1940) – Rufus Britt
- Go West (1940) – Dan Wilson (uncredited)
- Chad Hanna (1940) – Mr. Mott
- For Beauty's Sake (1941) – Julius H. Pringle
- Sergeant York (1941) – Uncle Lige (uncredited)
- Ball of Fire (1941) – Prof. Robinson
- This Gun for Hire (1942) – Alvin Brewster
- Moontide (1942) – Mr. Simpson
- Ten Gentlemen from West Point (1942) – Grandpa
- Behind Prison Walls (1943) – James J. MacGlennon
- Hitler's Madman (1943) – Teacher (uncredited) (final film)

== Stage plays ==
- Because She Loved Him So (1899)
- Sky Farm (1902)
- Hearts Aflame (1902)
- The Best of Friends (1903)
- An African Millionaire (1904)
- Just Out of College (1905)
- The Stolen Story (1906)
- The Builders (1907)
- Paid in Full (1908)
- The City (1910)
- The Talker (1912)
- The Girl and the Pennant (1913)
- The House of Bondage (1914)
- The Clever Ones (1915)
- The Trap (1915)
