= Charlotte Walker (actress) =

American actress (1876–1958)

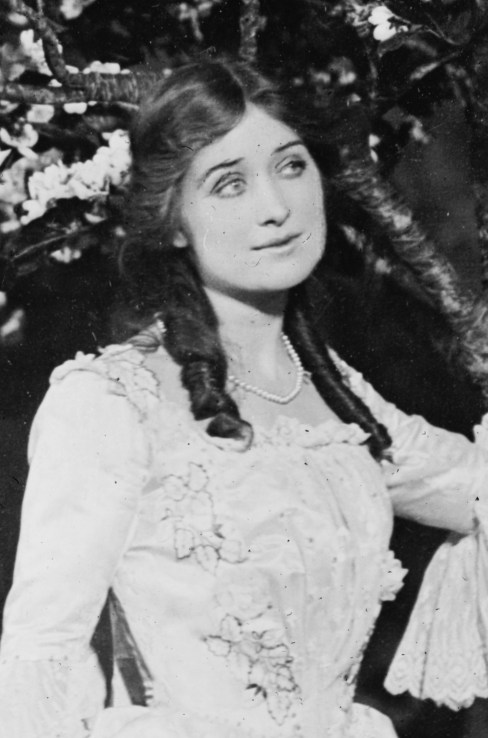
- Walker in 1902 Broadway play The Crisis
- Born: Charlotte Ganahl Walker; December 29, 1876; Galveston, Texas, U.S.
- Died: March 23, 1958 (aged 81); Kerrville, Texas, U.S.
- Resting place: Old City Cemetery, Galveston County, Texas, U.S.
- Occupation: Actress
- Years active: 1900–1941
- Spouses: Dr. John Haden (m. 1896; div. 1903) Eugene Walter (m. 1908; div. 1923)
- Children: 2, including Sara Haden

Charlotte Ganahl Walker (December 29, 1876 – March 23, 1958) was an American Broadway theater actress.

== Early years ==
A native of Galveston, Texas, Walker was the daughter of Mr. and Mrs. Edwin A. Walker.

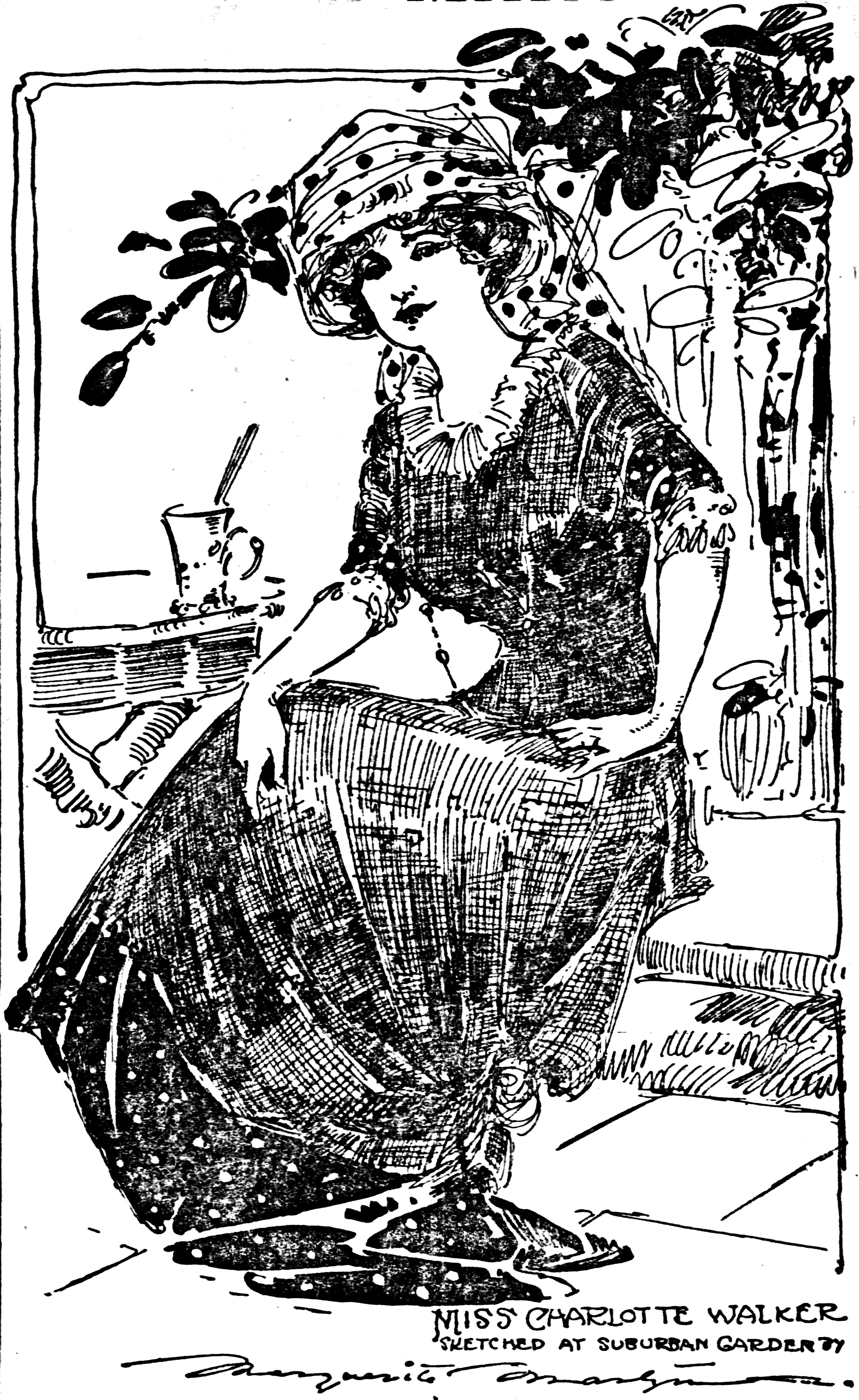
Walker as sketched by Marguerite Martyn, 1910

== Stage actress ==
Walker made her stage debut as a teen in 1893. At nineteen 1895 she performed in London, England in a comedy called The Mummy and in the same year performed with Richard Mansfield. Later, she returned to her native Texas after marrying and had two children. In 1900, she made her Broadway debut in Miss Prinnt. She returned to the stage in 1901 and appeared with James A. Herne. She was a leading lady with James K. Hackett from 1901 to 1905. In 1907 she appeared in the Broadway hit The Warrens of Virginia whose cast also had Gladys Smith (later Mary Pickford) and Cecil B. DeMille. She appeared as June in Trail of the Lonesome Pine, in 1911. She would later reprise the role in Cecil B. DeMille's 1916 film Trail of the Lonesome Pine. David Belasco noticed her in On Parole. He signed her for starring roles in plays The Warrens of Virginia, Just a Wife, and Call The Doctor. Each of the Belasco productions was staged prior to World War I.

She continued to act on the Broadway stage. In 1923 she played with Ethel Barrymore in The School For Scandal. It was produced by the Player's Club.

== Films ==
Walker's motion picture career began in 1915 with Kindling and Out of the Darkness. Sloth (1917) is a five-reeler which features Walker. In the third reel of this film she plays a youthful Dutch maid who is about sixteen years old. The setting is an old Dutch settlement on Staten Island, New York. The theme stresses the perils of indolence to a nation of people. It cautions against permitting luxury to replace the simple life led by America's forebears. In her later silent film work Walker can be seen in The Midnight Girl (1925) starring alongside a pre-Dracula Bela Lugosi. The Midnight Girl is one of Walker's few silents that survives.

As a film actress Walker continued to perform in films into the early 1930s. Her later screen performances include roles in Lightnin' (1930), Millie (1931), Salvation Nell (1931), and Hotel Variety (1933).

== Personal life and death ==
Walker married her first husband, Dr. John B. Haden, on November 16, 1896, in New York City. With him she had two daughters, Beatrice Shelton Haden (born 1897) and Katherine Haden (b. 1899), who was known as the actress Sara Haden. After her divorce, she returned to the stage. Dr. Haden died in 1930. Her second husband, Eugene Walter, was a playwright who adapted the novel The Trail of the Lonesome Pine for the Broadway stage. The second marriage also ended in divorce in 1930.

Walker lived in Center Point, Texas, the last 10 years of her life. She died on March 23, 1958, at a hospital in Kerrville, Texas at age 81. She was buried in Kerrville.

== Filmography ==
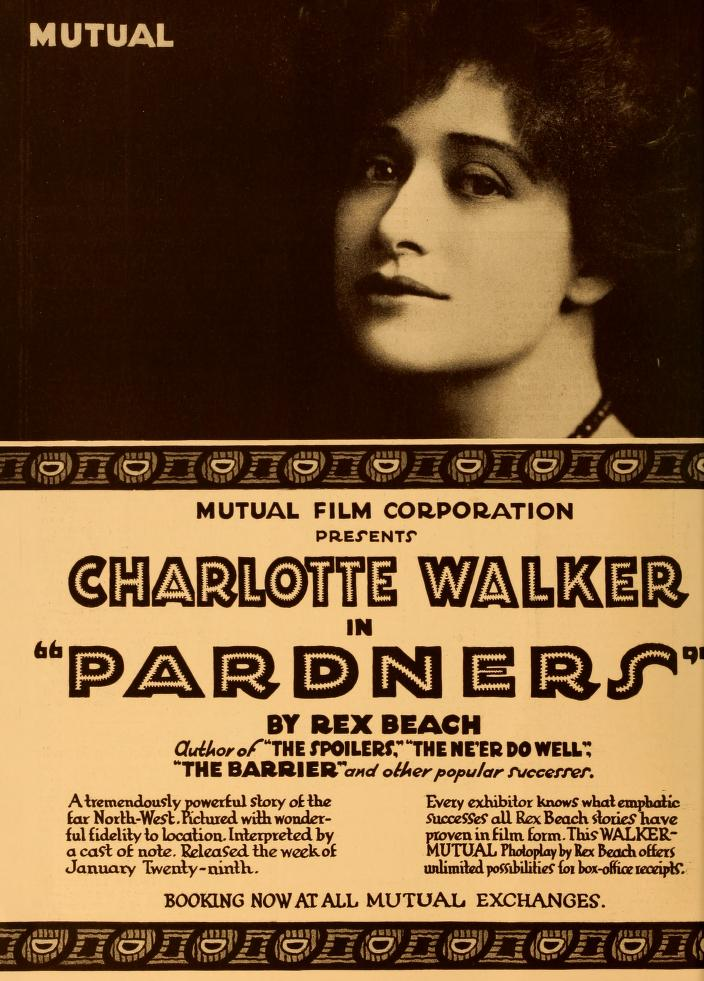
Pardners (1917)

Silent

Year	Title	Role	Notes
1915	Kindling	Maggie Schultz	Paramount Pictures
1915	Out of the Darkness	Helen Scott	Paramount Pictures
1916	The Trail of the Lonesome Pine	June Tolliver	Paramount Pictures
1917	Pardners	Olive	Mutual Film; Lost film
1917	The Seventh Sin	Margaret Brent / Sally Wells / Molly Pitcher	Triangle Film Corporation
1917	Mary Lawson's Secret	Mary Lawson	Pathé Exchange; Lost film
1918	Just a Woman	Anna Ward	US Exhibitor's Booking Corporation; Lost film
1918	Men	Mrs. Burton	US Exhibitor's Booking Corporation; Lost film
1918	Every Mother's Son	An American Mother	Fox Film Corporation; Lost film
1919	Eve in Exile	Eve Ricardo	Pathé Exchange
1924	The Lone Wolf	Clare Henshaw	Associated Exhibitors; Lost film
1924	The Sixth Commandment	Mrs. Calhoun	Associated Exhibitors; Lost film
1924	Classmates	Mrs. Stafford	First National; Lost film
1925	The Mad Marriage		Rosemary Films; Lost film
1925	The Midnight Girl	Mrs. Schuyler	Chadwick Pictures
1925	The Manicure Girl	Mrs. Morgan	Paramount Pictures; Lost film
1926	The Savage	Mrs. Atwater	First National; Lost film
1926	The Great Deception	Mrs. Mansfield	First National; Lost film
1927	The Clown		Columbia Pictures
1928	Annapolis	Aunt	Pathé Exchange

Sound

Year	Title	Role	Notes
1929	Paris Bound	Helen White	Pathé Exchange
1929	South Sea Rose	The Mother Superior	Fox Film Corporation; Lost film
1930	Double Cross Roads	Mrs. Tilton	Fox Film Corporation
1930	Three Faces East	Catherine, Lady Chamberlain	First National
1930	Scarlet Pages	Mrs. Mason	First National
1930	Lightnin'	Mrs. Thatcher	Fox Film Corporation
1931	Millie	Mrs Maitland	RKO
1931	Salvation Nell	Maggie	Tiffany Pictures
1933	Hotel Variety		Capitol Film Exchange; Lost film
1937	Scattergood Meets Broadway		RKO
