= Kindling (1915 film) =

1915 film

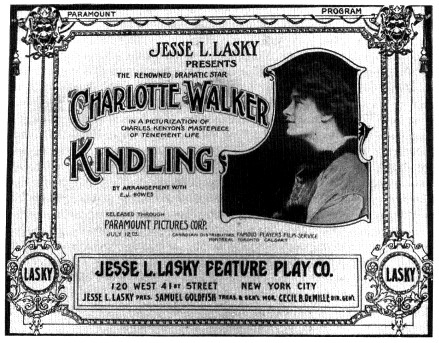
- 1915 lobby poster
- Directed by: Cecil B. DeMille
- Written by: Cecil B. DeMille
- Based on: Kindling by Charles Kenyon
- Produced by: Cecil B. DeMille; Jesse L. Lasky
- Starring: Charlotte Walker
- Cinematography: Alvin Wyckoff
- Edited by: Cecil B. DeMille
- Distributed by: Paramount Pictures
- Release date: July 12, 1915
- Running time: 5 reels
- Country: United States
- Language: Silent (English intertitles)
- Budget: $10,034
- Box office: $66,036

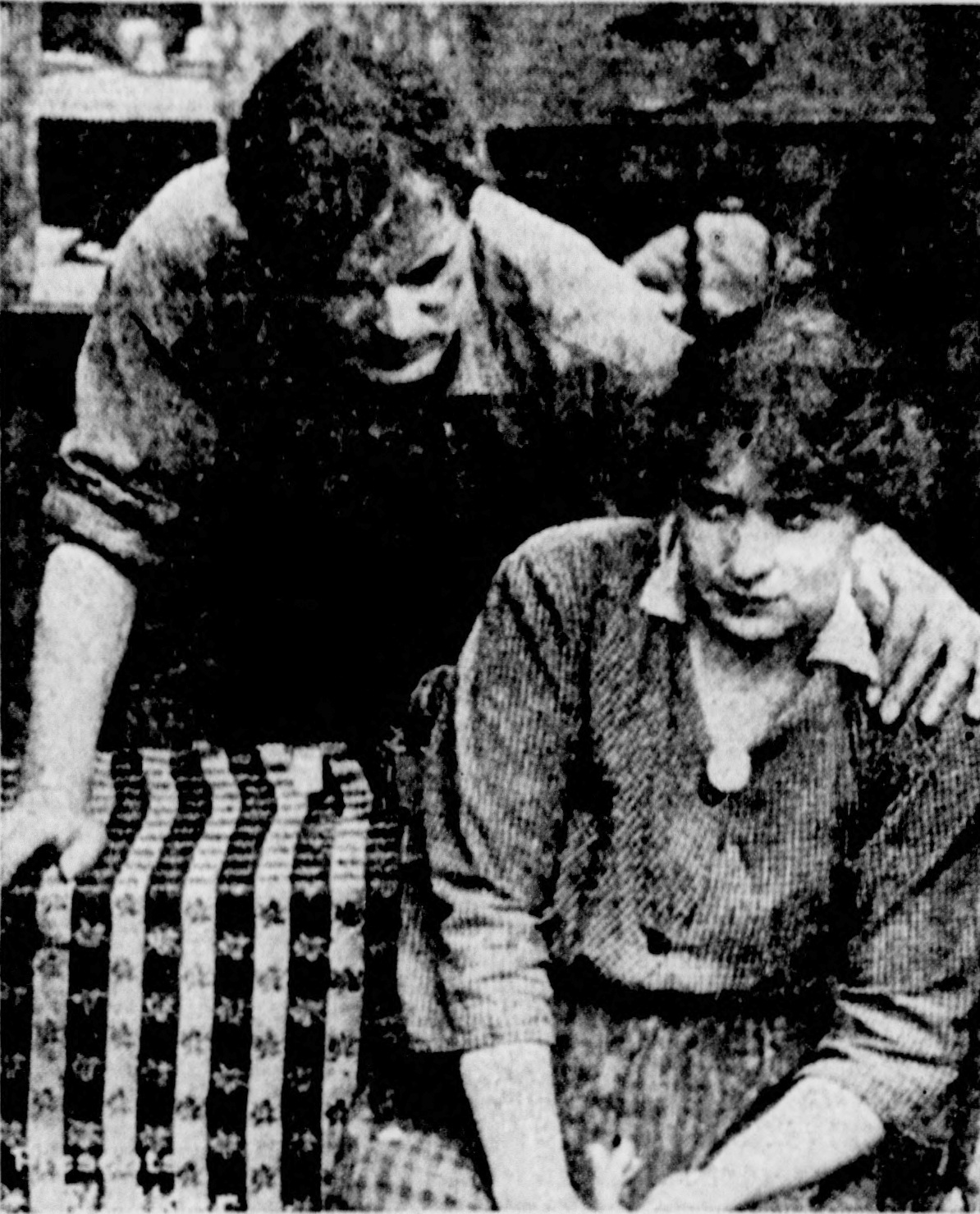
Scene from the film

Kindling is a 1915 American silent drama film produced and directed by Cecil B. DeMille and starring Charlotte Walker, in her film debut. A print of Kindling exists in the George Eastman Museum film archive. The film is based on a 1911 Broadway play by Charles A. Kenyon which starred Margaret Illington and was produced by her husband Major Bowes, later of radio fame.

== Cast ==
- Charlotte Walker as Maggie Schultz
- Thomas Meighan as 'Honest' Heine Schultz
- Raymond Hatton as Steve Bates
- Mrs. Lewis McCord as Mrs. Bates
- William Elmer as Rafferty (as Billy Elmer)
- Lillian Langdon as Mrs. Jane Burke-Smith
- Florence Dagmar as Alice Burke-Smith
- Tom Forman as Dr. Taylor
- Tex Driscoll as Detective (uncredited)
- Ben Hall as Young Thief (uncredited)
- Lucien Littlefield as Fence (uncredited)
- Jeanie Macpherson as Mrs. Burke-Smith's French Maid (uncredited)
