= Pardners (1917 film) =

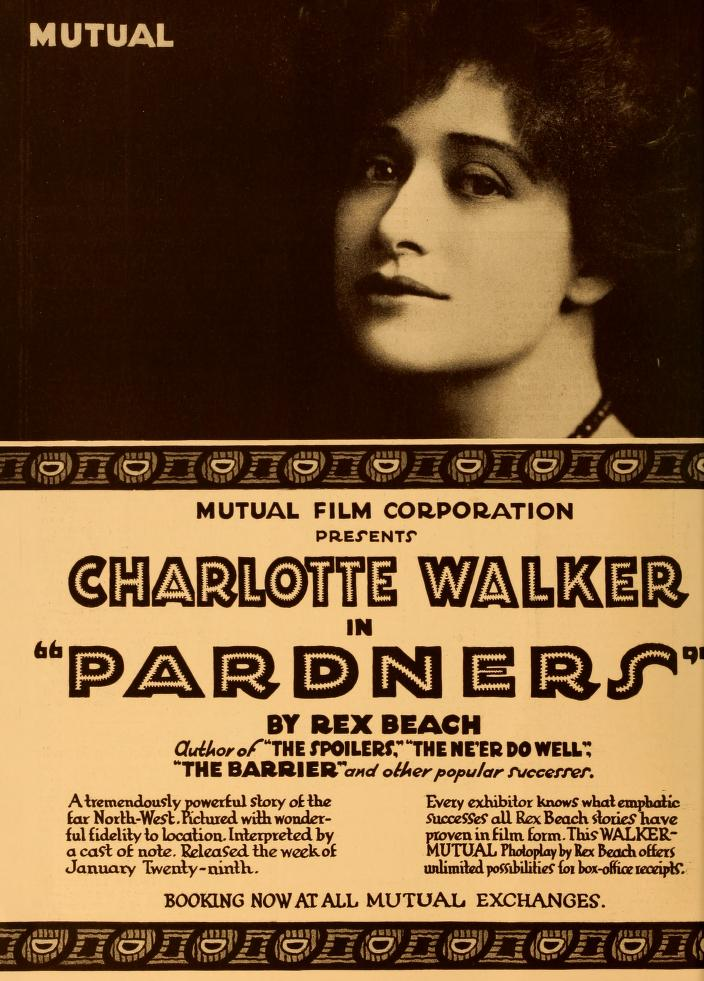
- Lobby poster
- Written by: Paul Sloane(scenario)
- Produced by: Thomas Edison
- Starring: Charlotte Walker
- Distributed by: Mutual Film
- Release date: January 29, 1917
- Running time: 5 reels
- Country: United States
- Language: Silent film (English intertitles)

Pardners is a lost 1917 silent feature drama written by Paul Sloane and starring Charlotte Walker. It is based on a Rex Beach story. The film was produced by the Edison Company and released through Mutual Film.

A one reel short of this Rex Beach story was produced in 1910 by Thomas Edison under the title of Pardners.

== Cast ==
- Charlotte Walker as Olive
- Richard Tucker as Justus Morrow
- Leo Gordon as Alonzo Struthers
- Charles Sutton as John Graham
- Redfield Clarke as Unknown
