= Every Mother's Son (1918 film) =

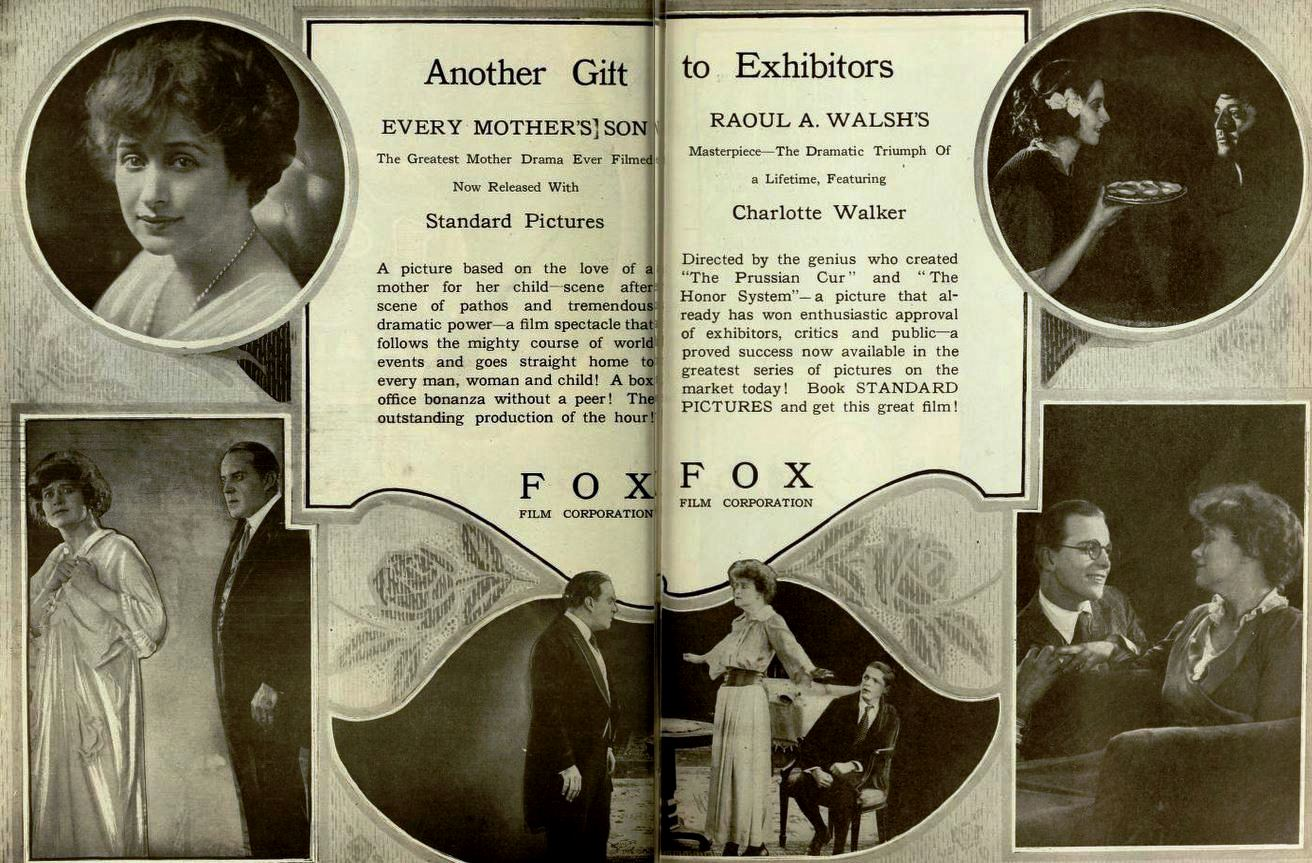
- Directed by: Raoul Walsh
- Written by: Raoul Walsh
- Produced by: William Fox
- Starring: Charlotte Walker; Percy Standing
- Distributed by: Fox Film Corporation
- Release date: December 1, 1918
- Running time: 5 reels
- Country: United States
- Language: Silent (English intertitles)

Every Mother's Son is a lost 1918 silent war propaganda film produced and distributed by Fox Film Corporation and directed by Raoul Walsh.

== Cast ==
- Charlotte Walker - An American Mother
- Percy Standing - An American Father
- Edwin Stanley - Eldest Son
- Ray Howard - Second Son
- Gareth Hughes - Third Son
- Corona Paynter - Daughter of France
- Bernard Thornton - Lt. Von Sterbling

== See also ==
- 1937 Fox vault fire
