= Just a Woman (1925 film) =

1925 film by Irving Cummings

- Directed by: Irving Cummings; Charles Woolstenhulme (Asst.)
- Written by: Jack Cunningham (scenario)
- Based on: Just a Woman by Eugene Walter
- Produced by: First National Pictures; M. C. Levee
- Starring: Claire Windsor; Conway Tearle
- Cinematography: Arthur L. Todd
- Edited by: Charles J. Hunt
- Distributed by: First National Pictures
- Release date: June 25, 1925
- Running time: 70 minutes
- Country: United States
- Language: Silent (English intertitles)

Just a Woman is a 1925 American silent drama film directed by Irving Cummings and starring Claire Windsor. It is based on the 1916 Broadway play by Eugene Walter and is a remake of a 1918 silent version starring Walter's wife, Charlotte Walker. The film and play was remade in the pre-Code sound era in 1933 as No Other Woman.

== Plot ==
As described in a film magazine review, June Holton, the wife of steelworker Robert Holton, has an agreement with their boarder, George Rand, that in return for room and board, and the use of a shop in the back yard to experiment in, that he will share 50–50 with her the proceeds of any invention he may perfect, looking for a new process for making steel. He succeeds. Robert strikes a bargain with the company's board of directors that is satisfactory to him and George, but not to June. She compels the board to meet her terms: $1 million in cash, a royalty of $5 per ton to be paid to George, and the elevation of her husband to be president. Plunged into wealth and a position of power, they visit New York City, where Robert falls a victim to the wiles of Clarice Clement, a stage dancer, who is determined to attach his wealth by marrying him. She convinces Robert that his wife is in love with George, and he agrees to obtain a divorce. Just as the referee is about to grant the divorce, Robert learns that trickery has been practiced on his wife, and he withdraws the suit. The couple is reconciled after June, to maintain custody of her child, has denied that Robert was the boy's father.

== Cast ==
- Claire Windsor as June Holton
- Conway Tearle as Robert Holton
- Dorothy Brock as Bobby Holton
- Percy Marmont as George Rand
- Dorothy Revier as Clarice Clement
- Eddie Gribbon as Oscar Dunn
- Louis Payne (undetermined secondary role)

== Preservation ==
With no prints of Just a Woman located in any film archives, it is a lost film.
