= The Seven Sisters (film) =

1915 film by Sidney Olcott

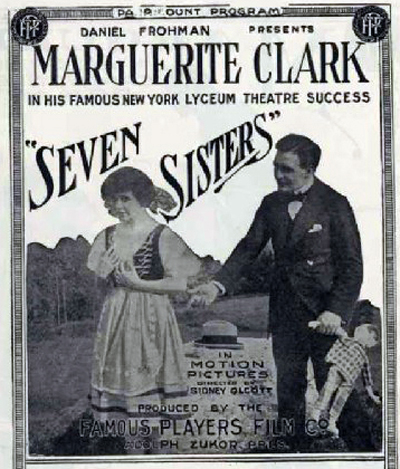
- Press sheet
- Directed by: Sidney Olcott
- Based on: Seven Sisters; 1911 play by Edith Ellis Furness and Ferenc Herczeg
- Produced by: Daniel Frohman
- Starring: Madge Evans; Marguerite Clark; Conway Tearle
- Production company: Famous Players Film Company
- Distributed by: Paramount Pictures
- Release date: July 26, 1915
- Running time: 50 minutes
- Country: United States
- Language: Silent (English intertitles)

The Seven Sisters is a 1915 American silent romantic comedy directed by Sidney Olcott. Based on the 1911 ensemble play Seven Sisters by Edith Ellis Furness and Ferenc Herczeg, the film starred Madge Evans, Marguerite Clark, and Conway Tearle. The film is now presumed lost.

== Cast ==
- Madge Evans as Clara
- Dorothea Camden as Liza
- Georgia Fursman as Perka
- Marguerite Clark as Mici
- Jean Stewart as Ella
- I. Feder as Sari
- Lola Barclay as Katinka
- Conway Tearle as Count Horkoy
- George Renavent as Toni
- Mayme Lunton as Gida
- Sydney Mason as Sandorffy
- Charles Kraus as Innkeeper
- Camilla Dalberg as Mother
- Marjorie Nelson as Bertha
- Edwin Mordant as Baron Rodviany
- Dick Lee as Servant
- Lizzie Goode as Innkeeper's Wife

== See also ==
- List of lost films
