= Fine Feathers (1921 film) =

1921 film

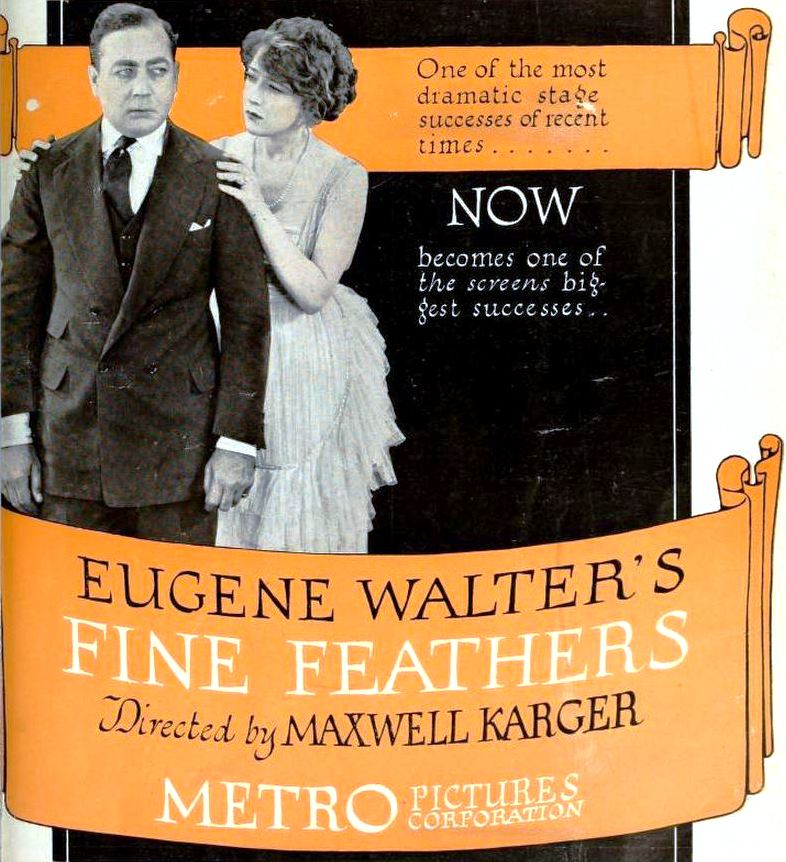
- Directed by: Fred Sittenham
- Written by: Lois Zellner
- Based on: Fine Feathers; 1912 play by Eugene Walter
- Produced by: Maxwell Karger
- Starring: Eugene Pallette; Claire Whitney; Thomas W. Ross; Warburton Gamble; June Elvidge
- Cinematography: Arthur A. Cadwell
- Music by: 60 minutes
- Production company: Metro Pictures Corporation
- Distributed by: Metro Pictures Corporation
- Release date: 1921
- Country: United States
- Language: English

Fine Feathers is a 1921 American silent drama film directed by Fred Sittenham and starring Eugene Pallette, Claire Whitney, Thomas W. Ross, Warburton Gamble and June Elvidge, produced and distributed by Metro Pictures Corporation. The library of Congress shows a release date of June 20, 1921 but there is evidence that Fine Feathers was being screened on June 18 at the Rose Theater in Santa Rosa California and as early as June 17 at the Star Theater in Monterey California. This production is the second movie adaptation of Eugene Walter's 1912 play of the same name. Three complete 35 mm copies were donated by M.G.M. to the U.S. Archive. A nitrate picture negative, an acetate positive print and an acetate fine grain master, all kept at the Eastman Museum in Rochester, NY.

== Plot ==
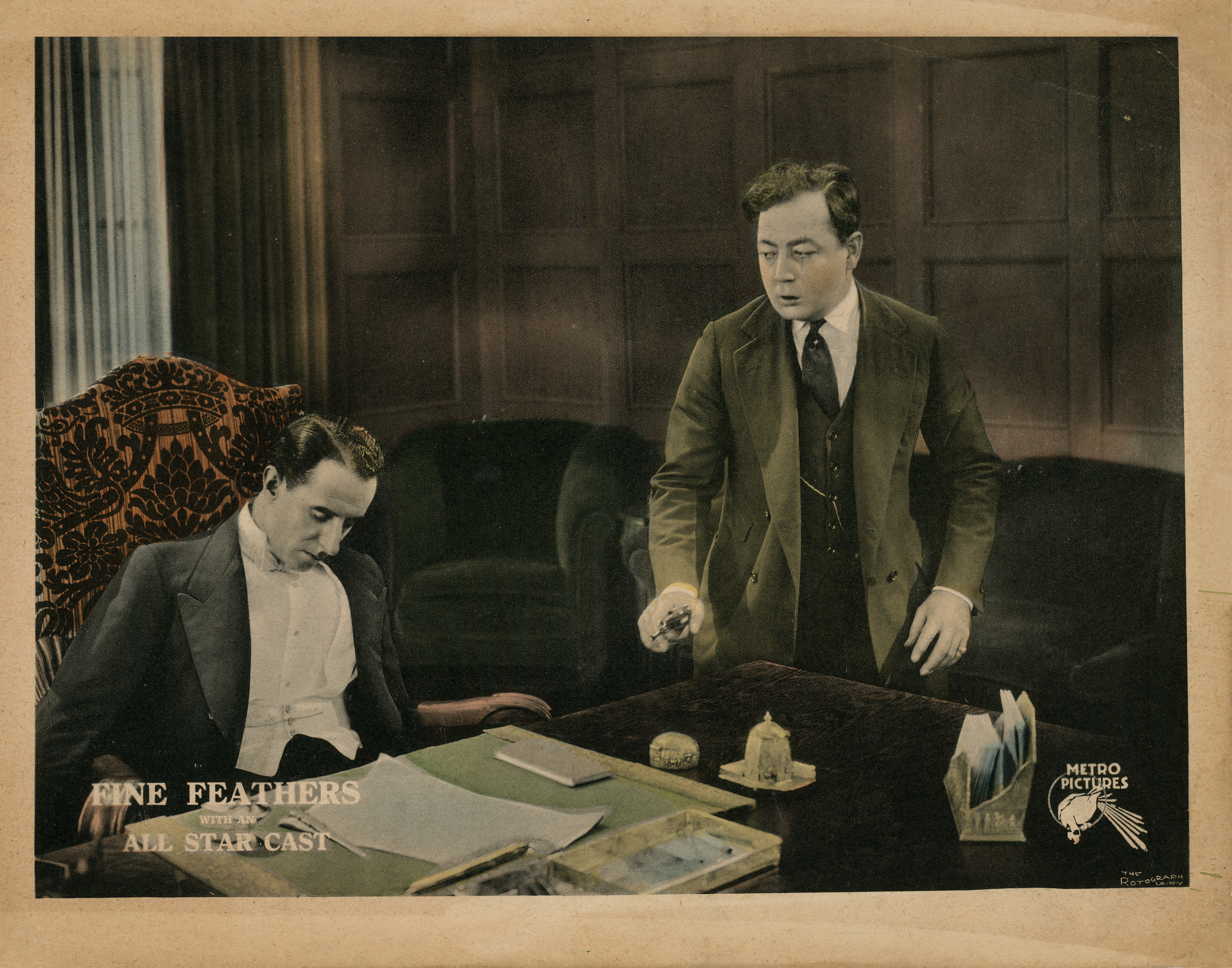
Lobby Card for Fine Feathers

Bob Reynolds is a young construction engineer, living with his pretty wife Jane in an old bungalow on Staten Island. He has become bitter because of his failure to get ahead and the fact that he is unable to get the clothes which he wishes for his wife. One night at the theater they witness the production of "Paid in Full" and Bob's sympathies are with the husband who succumbs to the temptation to steal, while Jane chides him, saying nothing should cause a man to be dishonest.

A few days later Bob receives a letter from John Brand, a shrewd conscienceless capitalist whom he has known in college. He asks Bob to visit him and after chiding the young engineer for always playing the game straight, he makes him a proposition which he says will place him on easy street and enable him to buy Jane the fine feathers she should wear. He offers Bob a large sum for accepting an inferior grade of cement for a dam which Bob's company is constructing, and after a struggle with his conscience, the young man accepts.

Two years pass and Bob and Jane enjoy the luxuries of the wealth that has come to them. Brand, however dislikes to see the young man enjoy the wealth and he persuades him to gamble in stocks which he manipulates until the young man is wiped out. Bob then sees himself for what he is, a sneak and a thief.

The crash comes one evening while Mr. and Mrs. Brand are entertaining guests. Bob attempts to drown his sorrow in drink and then confesses his plight to Jane, seeking to lay his downfall on her.

The memory of "Paid in Full" returns to Bob and he suggests that Jane go to Brand's apartments and plead with him. She accuses the man of deliberately ruining her husband and because he is fascinated with her, he consents to help them. But at this point word reaches them that the great dam with the inferior cement has broken and hundreds of persons have been swept to their doom. Bob confronts his wife with the news, and insinuates she gave herself to Brand as payment for his help. She bitterly denies this, but in a drunken frenzy Bob goes to Brand's home, shoots him and then calling the police to tell them Brand has been killed, he places the gun to his own head and fires.

== Cast ==
- Eugene Pallette as Bob Reynolds
- Claire Whitney as Jane Reynolds
- Thomas W. Ross as Dick Meade
- Warburton Gamble as John Brand
- June Elvidge as Mrs. Brand

== Production ==
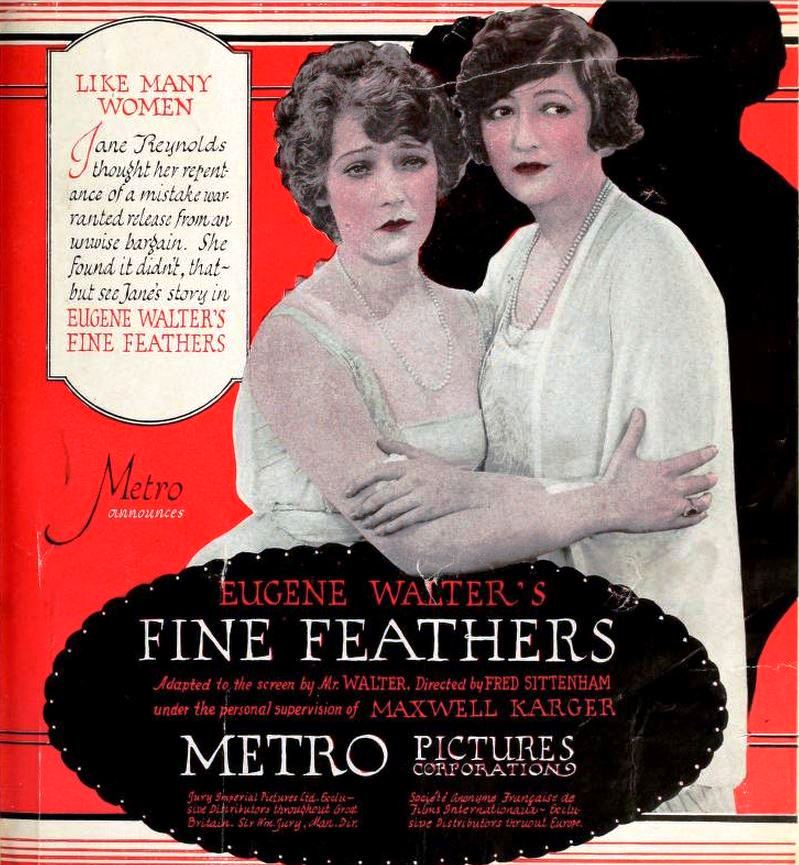

On July 20, 1920, the New York Clipper writes that Fred Sittenham who is finishing filming Clothes has been selected by Maxwell Karger, Metro's Director General, to direct the upcoming production of Fine Feathers. Frederick Truesdell who is playing in The Gold Diggers on Broadway, is also said to have been hired for the role of John Brand but on September 26, 1920, The Illustrated Buffalo Express runs an article announcing that he was replaced by Warburton Gamble and that Truesdell was shifted to playing J.B. Hollis, Brand's partner.

Louise Huff was initially cast as Jane Reynolds but became ill. Metro went through dozens of actresses before they found Claire Whitney at the beginning of August 1920.

Fine Feathers was mostly shot in New York City in August, September and October 1920 at the Metro studios on 61st Street for the interiors. Some exterior scenes were shot on Staten Island, the Kensico reservoir was used as a location for the dam and one elaborate exterior crowd scene was shot in front of the Comedy Theatre on 41st Street. On August 7, 1920, the trade journal, The Moving Picture World breaks the news that "Permission has been obtained from the city police and the fire departments by Fred H. (sic) Sittenham, director of Metro's all-star picturization of Eugene Walter's stage play, "Fine Feathers," to take some exterior scenes before one of New York's leading theatres during the "wee sma'" hours of the morning." The scene was to feature 1,500 extras representing a typical New York theatre crowd on a Saturday night during a thunder shower. Principal photography ended at the beginning of October with exterior shots for Brand's home filmed at Billie Burke's "summer place", Burkeley Crest, now demolished and that was part of the Ziegfeld estate at Hastings-on-Hudson.

The Visalia Times, a year after the Moving Picture World's article and 3 months after the release of the movie, reports on September 20, 1921, in a fairly detailed article that the Metro had built the facade of the Belasco in Yonkers for the theater scene. This is implausible for two reasons. One this was a movie made on a tight budget and building the facade of an entire building would have been prohibitively expensive but more importantly, there is at least one contemporaneous account of the overnight shoot in front of the Comedy Theatre. A writer for Picture-Play Magazine going by the pen name of The Bystander writes "And that evening, on the way home, at about half-past two, what do you suppose we ran into? A company taking scenes in front of one of the Broadway theaters for "Fine Feathers," the Metro picture. And one of the men in our party knew Fred Sittenham, who was directing. and asked him if we couldn't be in the crowd, and he said we could, and we stayed there till dawn came up on Broadway".

Claire Whitney who plays Jane Reynolds, the leading female role, will say to the press that she has discovered a new set of film production critics who constitute the most reliable barometer for the success of any particular scene in the production. While working on location in Staten Island, she was always watched by scores of children of various ages who lived in the vicinity and after talking with a number of them, she decided that if they did not like any particular scene, it had better be retaken.

For the bursting of the dam, art director M.P. Staulcup built a miniature dam in the Metro New York studio, showing the wide spillway, the rock shores and the narrow valley with its entrance blocked by the great dam and the country spread out below it. To conform to the every little block of masonry in the dam, it was plastered together so to insure realism when the flood waters would start eating it away. The carefully constructed model was mounted on a large base with an outlet to carry off the water and two fire hoses trained on the back of the model. With the cameraman stationed close to the miniature, the water was turned on and as the basin began to fill the camera registered the growing flood. Under the force of the water the lightly plastered masonry started to crumble and with a rush the entire spillway gave way. The cameraman said the only casualty was his thoroughly drenched pants.

Despite those efforts, Wid's Daily will write that "The model certainly doesn't look at all real". The Exhibitor Herald will add "The scene of the bursting dam — a plaster of paris affair — would not fool the novice in filmdom, as it looked nothing like the massive stone structure against which the company was photographed several times previously".

== Critical reception ==
Fine Feathers was neither a commercial nor a critical success. Laurence Reid in The Motion Picture News felt that the idea behind the picture had been used so often as to lose its effectiveness and that the movie was slow with an almost total absence of suspense. The reviewer from Variety was in agreement and thought that he might have watched an edited version of the movie as it was advertised to be in six reels, but the version he saw was considerably less than an hour. His verdict: "It was just as well". Just like Lawrence Reid, he lamented the lack of action leading up to a single situation. "Tense enough to be sure, but still but one".

Wid's Daily bluntly states: Not the Best Kind of Entertainment Available. They find the production satisfactory, but containing evidence of revisions and cutting which probably benefited the movie but left it plagued with continuity errors. They also mention too many title cards and as a whole, too heavy for summer entertainment.

Exhibitors Daily writes that this "adapted play fails to convince as the spoken drama did. Cheaply produced and shows marks of age.
