= Paid in Full (1914 film) =

Lost 1914 silent film drama

- Directed by: Augustus E. Thomas
- Written by: Louis Reeves Harrison
- Based on: Paid in Full (play), by Eugene Walter
- Produced by: All Star Feature Corporation
- Starring: Tully Marshall
- Music by: Manuel Klein
- Release date: February 1914
- Running time: 5 reels
- Country: USA
- Language: Silent (English intertitles)

Paid in Full is a lost 1914 silent drama film directed by Augustus E. Thomas and starring Tully Marshall. It is based on a 1908 play by Eugene Walter.

The story was re-filmed just five years later as Paid in Full with Pauline Frederick.

== Cast ==
- Tully Marshall - Joe Brooks
- Caroline French - Emma Brooks
- Riley Hatch - Captain Williams (*as William Riley Hatch)
- George Irving - Jimsey Smith (*as George H. Irving)
- Winifred Kingston - Beth Harris
- Hattie Russell - Mrs. Harrie
- Irving Southard - The Detective
- T. Tamamoto - Sato, Williams' valet
- Alfred Sidwell - Mr. Harris
