= Paid in Full (1919 film) =

1919 film by Emile Chautard

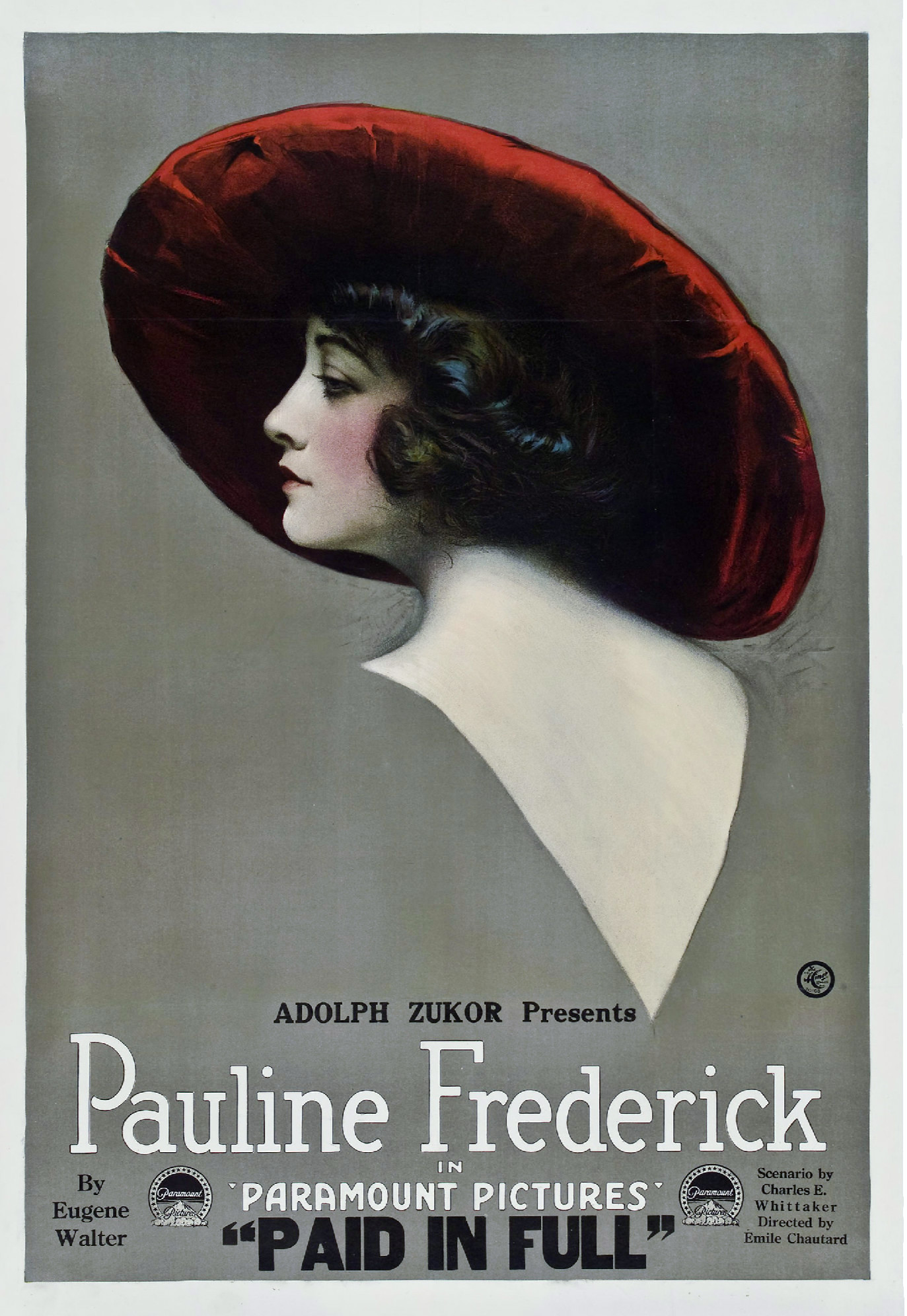
- Film poster
- Directed by: Emile Chautard
- Written by: Charles E. Whittaker (scenario); Frank S. Beresford
- Based on: Paid in Full by Eugene Walter
- Produced by: Adolph Zukor; Jesse Lasky
- Starring: Pauline Frederick
- Cinematography: Jacques Bizeul(fr)
- Distributed by: Paramount Pictures
- Release date: February 23, 1919
- Running time: 5 reels
- Country: United States
- Language: Silent (English intertitles)

Paid in Full is a 1919 American silent drama film starring Pauline Frederick and directed by Emile Chautard. It was produced by Famous Players–Lasky and released by Paramount Pictures. The film is based on the hit 1908 Broadway stage play Paid in Full by Eugene Walter which starred Lillian Albertson. There were two previous silent film adaptations of the play: a short in 1910 and a feature in 1914.

== Cast ==
- Pauline Frederick as Emma Brooks
- Robert Cain as Joe Brooks
- Wyndham Standing as Jimsy Smith
- Frank Losee as Captain Williams
- Jane Farrell as Mrs. Harris
- Vera Beresford as Beth Harris

== Preservation ==
Paid in Full is currently presumed lost. In February of 2021, the film was cited by the National Film Preservation Board on their Lost U.S. Silent Feature Films list.
