= Just a Woman (1918 film) =

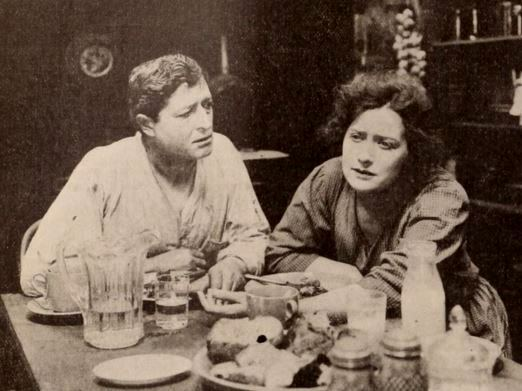
- Film still
- Directed by: Julius Steger
- Written by: Maitland Merrill (scenario)
- Based on: Just a Woman by Eugene Walter
- Produced by: Joseph Schenck
- Production companies: S & S Photoplays
- Distributed by: U.S. Exhibitor's Booking Corp.
- Release date: April 11, 1918
- Running time: 6 reels
- Country: United States
- Language: Silent (English intertitles)

Just a Woman is a lost 1918 American silent drama film directed by Julius Steger based on a Broadway play, Just a Woman, by Eugene Walter. The film starred Charlotte Walker, then wife of playwright Walter.

The film was remade again in 1925 as Just a Woman with Claire Windsor.

== Cast ==
- Charlotte Walker as Anna Ward
- Lee Baker as Jim Ward
- Forrest Robinson as Judge Van Brink
- Henry Carvill as John Prentiss
- Edwin Stanley as Fred Howard
- Anna Williams as Mary
- Charles Kraus as Elias fox
- Lorna Volare
- Cornish Beck
- Florence Deshon
- Camilla Dalberg

== Reception ==
Just a Woman was subject to cuts by city and state film censorship boards. For example, the Chicago Board of Censors cut, in Reel 4, the embrace between the husband and woman after the intertitle "I hope to be back soon", and, Reel 6, the intertitle "I want the court to understand" etc.
