= Fine Feathers (play) =

Robert Edeson as Robert Reynolds and Lolita Robertson as Jane Reynolds in 1912 for the original stage production of Fine Feathers at the Cort Theatre in Chicago

Fine Feathers is a 1912 drama in four acts by Eugene Walter.

== Origin ==
The play started as a scenario by Walter Hackett called "C.O.D.". Hackett, behind by $3,000 on his board bill at the Hotel Algonquin, negotiated with Frank M. Case, then manager of the Algonquin (he would later buy the hotel in 1932), to settle his account in exchange for twenty-five percent of all royalties on "C.O.D.". Hackett had learned his lesson, when 4 years earlier he landed in jail after trying to pay his hotel bill at the Castleton in Staten Island with forged checks. Eugene Walter was then called to whip the play into shape for production.

First produced for the stage as Fads and Frills by Charles Dillingham in 1910, it was abandoned as a failure after a three-week run. Sam Shubert and Lee Shubert thereafter produced the play as Homeward Bound. It premiered in New York on January 28, 1911 at the Daly's Theatre and subsequently went on tour, but was losing money and further performances were suspended. On March 27, 1911 the New York Daily Tribune announced that the Shuberts were preparing to make another production of Homeward Bound, this time starring Margaret Illington. The New York Clipper wrote that Walter had changed the title of his play again, to Who's to Blame?. Whether it was true or a subtle April Fool's joke (it was published April 1), the new title for the third rewrite of the play was Mrs. Maxwell's Mistake. It was anticipated to premiere April 17, 1911 at the Maxine Elliott Theatre but was rescheduled at the last minute for the following week; it ended up premiering at the Park Theatre in Bridgeport CT for one show on April 20. It finally made its Broadway debut on April 24 at the Maxine Elliott Theatre, but was again a commercial failure.

After three unsuccessful attempts as a comedy, Eugene Walter decided sometime after May 1911 to rewrite the play as a drama.

Theatrical agent and producer Harry Frazee met Walter on a train ride from Chicago to New York City, and convinced him that his latest rewrite of the play, now titled Fine Feathers, was the best thing he had ever written. He offered the playwright a contract and a royalty check in exchange for significant creative control.

His confidence boosted by Frazee's enthusiasm and money, Walter felt that he might finally have a box office hit on his hands and decided to approach Frank M. Case, who was still entitled to twenty-five percent of all royalties, and on June 4, 1912 an agreement was signed by which Case sold all his rights in the play to Walter for $200.

The play opened at the Cort Theatre in Chicago August 12, 1912.

== Characters ==
- John Brand: The businessman
- Robert Reynolds: The husband
- Dick Mead: The friend
- Jane Reynolds: The wife
- Mrs. Collins: The neighbor
- Frieda: The hired girl
- The Nurse

== Synopsis ==
Bob Reynolds, earning $25 a week, occupies a bungalow on Staten Island which he is trying hard to own. His wife has had five years of domestic drudgery, as she calls it when John Brand, Bob's old classmate, but now a rich and unscrupulous man of affairs, proposes to put $40,000 into the young man's purse provided he will certify to the use of an inferior grade cement in the building of a large water dam.

Bob lightly rejects the proposition but Mrs. Reynolds enters into a secret understanding with Brand to use her influence with her husband to earn the $40,000 after plainly telling Bob that he is a fool for scorning such an offer. When Bob still adheres to his resolution, he is anon confronted by the issue either of losing his ambitious wife or subscribing to Brand's terms, and he yields.

Five years later the Reynolds are living in a fashionable house on Long Island, but Bob is paying the wages of his sin. He has speculated, lost and must make good a check of $10,000 against an overdrawn account. In a frenzy of liquor he accuses Brand of having ruined him and demands more money on penalty of dragging him to jail. Brand taunts him with the threat that Mrs. Reynolds will also be drawn into the vortex of ruin, if he persists in exposing things, but on second thought protects Bob's check. The desperate condition of things has finally opened to the wife's mind to the consequences of the dishonesty to which she has sacrificed her husband, and now, willing to begin life all over, they are rejoicing in the news that the threatened arrest has been averted, when the information comes that the dam built of the defective cement has been swept away and the lives of a whole community have been destroyed. This hastens the climax.

In a graphic scene, the remorse-stricken husband prepares his wife for what is to come. He takes the telephone and rings up the police station directing that an officer be sent to his house address. The electric lights are extinguished in a flash, the sharp report of a pistol rings out and the wife sinks into the divan with a heart rending moan.

== Performance history ==
H.H. Frazee's Production

- August 12, 1912 Cort Theatre, Chicago, Illinois
- January 7, 1913 Astor Theatre, New York, New York (10 weeks)
- May 5, 1913 MacDonough Theatre, Oakland, Californina (3 Days)
- June 1, 1913 Heilig Theatre, Portland, Oregon (4 Days)
- June 26, 1913 Auditorium, Spokane, Washington (3 Days)
- August 30, 1913 Bronx Opera House, Bronx, New York (1 week)
- October 9, 1913 Turner Theatre, New Ulm, Minnestoa (1 show)

== Lawsuits ==
The play's convoluted origin and subsequent success made it prime ground for litigation.

- On March 7, 1913, Frank M. Case, owner of the Algonquin, sued Eugene Walter asking $2,000 for his share of the royalties of Fine Feathers.
- On March 10, 1913, Lee Shubert sued Eugene Walter for $50,000 for failure to live up to the terms of an agreement by which he was to have the privilege of producing Homeward Bound, and said that his contract With Eugene Walter covered the changes made in the original play and that Walter broke this contract when he allowed another producer to have the play.
- In April 1913, Walter Hackett sued Eugene Walter to restrain him from presenting Fine Feathers, claiming that the work was being produced as the individual work of the defendant but was in fact a joint work of Walter and himself.
- On July 30, 1913, Walter Hackett and Eugene Walter sued Frank M. Case to assign all interests in Fine Feathers.

== Adaptations ==
There have been several adaptations of Fine Feathers.

=== Stage ===
Nine Feathers was a one-act burlesque with a cast of 5, written by Fred Donaghey and created as a curtain raiser for "The Girl at the Gate". It was tried out in Detroit and was a big hit according to reports.

=== Opera ===
In February 1913, an announcement was made to the media by H.H. Frazee's press office that negotiations had been concluded between himself and Hans Bartsch & Co. representing Ruggero Leoncavallo, who would write an opera score to Fine Feathers. The project never occurred and may have been a publicity stunt.

=== Book ===
Fine Feathers was novelized twice.

- The first time in January 1913 by Marie Louise Gannon for The Green Book Magazine.
- The second time in 1914 by Webster Denison and published by A.C. McClurg & Co. in Chicago. The book was then serialized in newspapers around the United States starting in late 1914. It was successful enough that it was still being published as late as 1942.

=== Film ===
- Directed by Joseph A. Golden, the film Fine Feathers opened on June 14, 1915
- Fine Feathers was adapted again in 1921, this time directed by Fred Sittenham.
