= Just a Wife =

1910 play written by Eugene Walter

- Written by: Eugene Walter
- Original language: English

Premiere
- Date premiered: Broadway February 1, 1910
- Place premiered: Belasco Theatre

Just a Wife is a 1910 play by Eugene Walter that was adapted to silent film in 1920.

It was performed on Broadway at the Belasco Theatre in 1910, and was made into a silent film released in 1920 and directed by Howard C. Hickman.

After producer David Belasco chose actress Frances Starr over playwright Eugene Walter's wife Charlotte Walker to star in the 1909 popular play The Easiest Way, Walter wrote Just a Wife for her. After out-of-town warmup performances in Cleveland, Buffalo, and Rochester, it debuted on Broadway at the Belasco Theatre on February 1, 1910. The reviews were not generally positive, though it ran for 79 performances.

Critic William Winter summarized the plot as follows:

In this play a libertine named John Emerson, who has consorted with a widow named Lathrop until their relation has become a public scandal, by way of "keeping up appearances" marries an impecunious vestal from South Carolina, named, Mary Ashby. As he immediately installs Mrs. Emerson in a luxurious rural habitation somewhere on Long Island and practically deserts her, this expedient would hardly seem to be of much social service. However, after neglecting his wife for about six years, Emerson grows weary of his mistress, quarrels with her and runs way from her to visit his wife. The mistress, much incensed, follows him, and a short of three-cornered debate, --protracted, sophistical, and indelicate, --on the sexual relation is held at Mrs. Emerson's country residence, in the course of which that lady manifests a sweet temper and admirable self-control. After is it over, Mrs. Lathrop (to whom it has been intimated that in men the ruling passion is sex impulse and that she is growing somewhat elderly) goes away in a peaceful and much chastened mood. Mrs. Emerson then snubs her neglectful spouse and signifies that he may not hope to possess her as his wife until he has recognized the supremacy of Love, which it is implied he will soon do.

== Cast ==
- Edmund Breese as John Emerson
- Frederick Burton as Wellesley
- Amelia Gardner as Eleanor Lathrop
- Ernest Glendinning as Bobby Ashby
- Bobby North as Maxcy Steuer
- Charlotte Walker, Eugene Walter's wife, as Mary Ashby
