= Eugene Walter (playwright) =

American playwright (1874–1941)

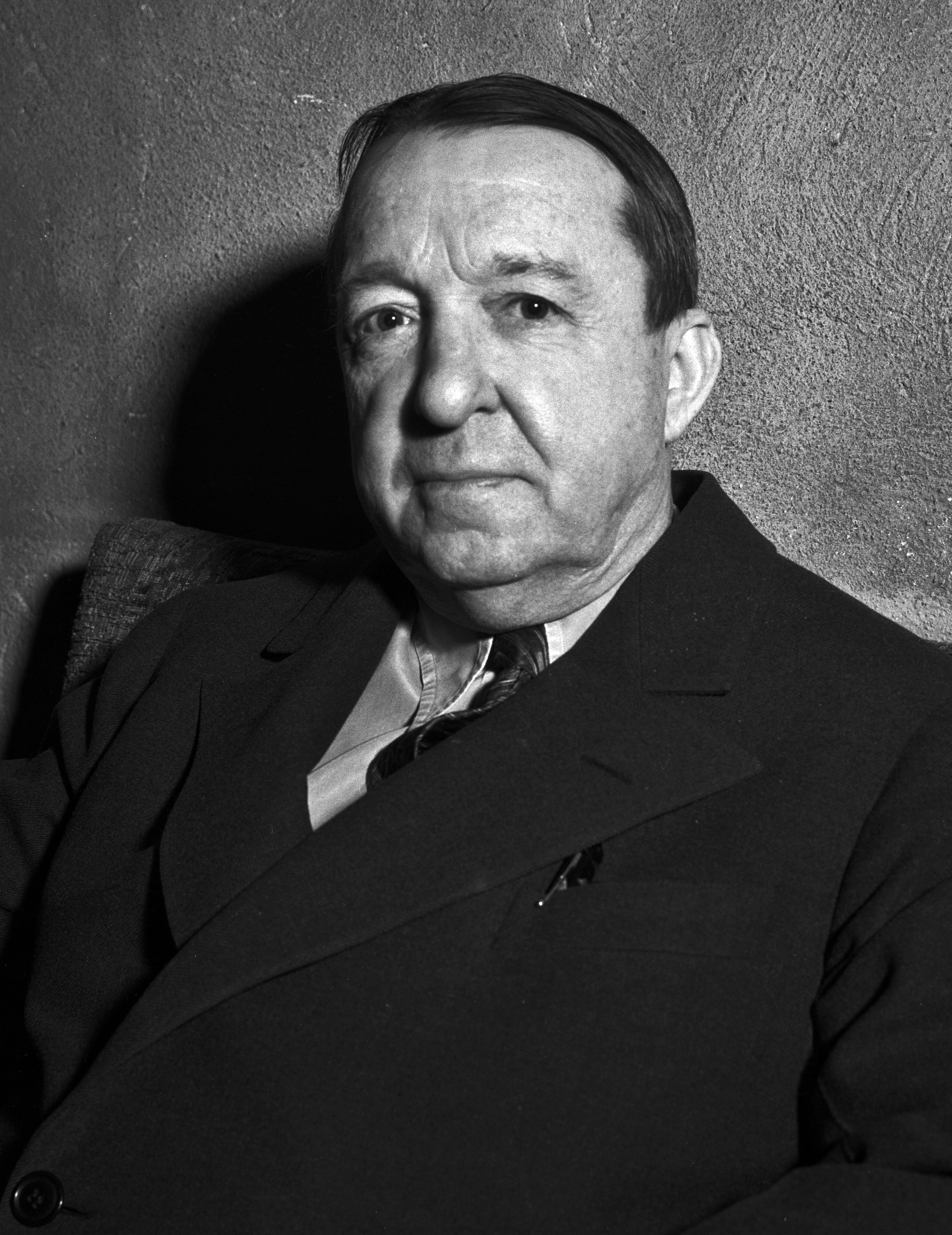
- Walter in 1929
- Born: November 27, 1874; Cleveland, Ohio, U.S.
- Died: September 26, 1941 (aged 66); Hollywood, California, U.S.
- Resting place: Los Angeles National Cemetery, Los Angeles County California
- Spouse: Charlotte Walker (m.1908–div.1923)

Eugene Walter (November 27, 1874 – September 26, 1941) was a playwright. He was the author of the hit play The Easiest Way.

== Biography ==
He was born on November 27, 1874, in Cleveland, Ohio. He served in the 1st Ohio Cavalry as a private and was a veteran of the Spanish–American War.

He was married to actress Charlotte Walker in 1908 in Cincinnati. They separated for a time in 1910. The marriage ended in divorce in October 1923, when he secretly married Mary Kissel in Mexico. She was a New York artists' model and actress.

=== Description ===
Artist and reporter Marguerite Martyn described Walter in 1910:

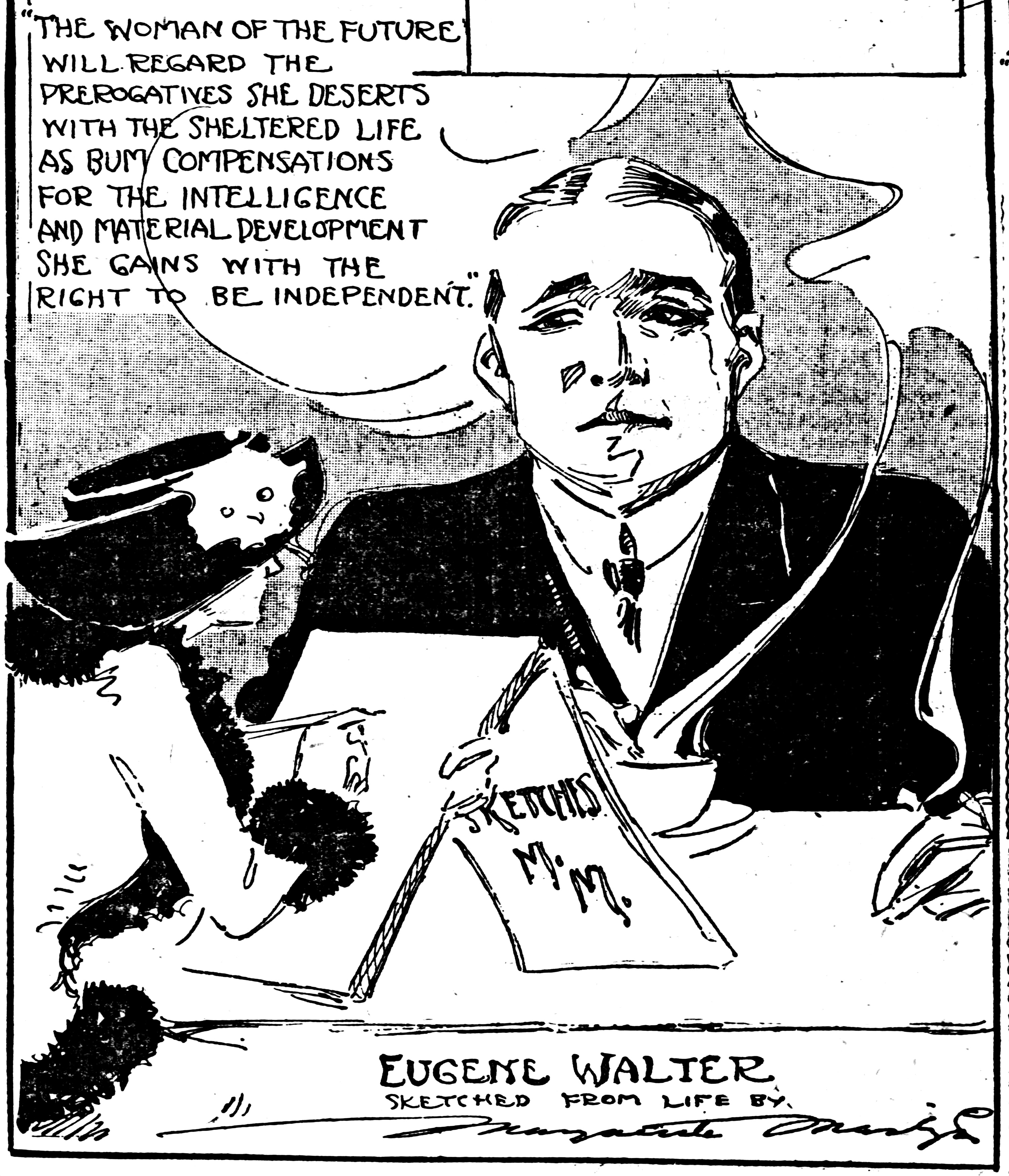
Artist and reporter Marguerite Martyn sketches Walter in 1911.

He is a man whose growth has not gone to length of limb or body. His incessant interest in life has taken him to many rough corners of the earth, so he is weather-toughened and looks as if he might be in excellent athletic training. He is small of stature and sturdy. He has a long upper lip and big eyes which he narrows and fixes upon something way off in the future. He is perfectly quiet, and you might think a little diffident — until he has something to say.

She also interviewed him in 1911.

=== Death ===
Walter died of cancer on September 26, 1941, in Hollywood, Los Angeles. He was buried at the Los Angeles National Cemetery in Sawtelle.

== Plays ==
- Sergeant James (1901), later called Boots and Saddles (1909)
- The Flag Station (1905)
- The Undertow (1907)
- Paid in Full (1908)
- The Real Issue (1908)
- The Wolf (1908)
- The Easiest Way (1909)
- Boots and Saddles (1909)
- Just a Wife (1910)
- The Assassin (1911)
- The Trail of the Lonesome Pine (1912), adapted from the novel of the same name
- Fine Feathers (1912)
- Just a Woman (1916)
- The Knife (1917) (aka The Assassin)
- Nancy Lee (1918)
- The Challenge (1919)
- The Man's Name (1921)
- Jealousy (1928), based on the French play Monsieur Lamberthier by Louis Verneuil
- Come Angel Band (1936)

== Selected filmography ==
- Paid in Full, directed by Augustus Thomas (1914, based on the play Paid in Full)
- The Wolf, directed by Barry O'Neil (1914, based on the play The Wolf)
- The Easiest Way, directed by Albert Capellani (1917, based on the play The Easiest Way)
- Just a Woman, directed by Julius Steger (1918, based on the play Just a Woman)
- Paid in Full, directed by Émile Chautard (1919, based on the play Paid in Full)
- Just a Woman, directed by Irving Cummings (1925, based on the play Just a Woman)
- The Easiest Way, directed by Jack Conway (1931, based on the play The Easiest Way)
- No Other Woman, directed by J. Walter Ruben (1933, based on the play Just a Woman)

=== Screenwriter ===
- Love, Honor and Obey, directed by Leander de Cordova (1920)
- Mother Knows Best, directed by John G. Blystone (1928)
- Pardon My Gun, directed by Robert De Lacey (1930)
- Upper World, directed by Roy Del Ruth (1934, uncredited)
- Woman Trap, directed by Harold Young (1936)
