= When Ladies Meet =

When Ladies Meet may refer to:

- When Ladies Meet (play), a 1932 play by Rachel Crothers
- When Ladies Meet (1933 film), an adaptation of the play
- When Ladies Meet (1941 film), another adaptation
