= Meadowcroft =

Meadowcroft may refer to:

- Meadowcroft Rockshelter, an archaeological site in Pennsylvania, United States, and the associated Meadowcroft Village museum
- The estate now called the John Ellis Roosevelt Estate
- A ward of Aylesbury where Quarrendon Estate is located
- Meadowcroft, the original title of the British soap opera Brookside

== People with surname Meadowcroft ==
- Harold Meadowcroft (1889–1916), English footballer
- James Meadowcroft (born 1954), Canadian academic
- Jim Meadowcroft (1946–2015), British snooker player
- Michael Meadowcroft (born 1942), British politician
- Stan Meadowcroft, fictional character in British television sitcom dinnerladies
- William Henry Meadowcroft (1853–1937), secretary and biographer of Thomas Edison
