= Meet the Wife =

Meet the Wife refers to:

- Meet the Wife (play), 1923 Broadway play
- Meet the Wife (film), 1931 American film
- Meet the Wife (TV series), British TV series
