= Nice People =

Nice People may refer to:

- Nice People (play), 1921 play by Rachel Crothers
- Nice People (film), 1922 silent film directed by William C. deMille
- Nice People (TV France), French reality TV series
