= Klaw Theatre =

Former theatre in Manhattan, New York

- Avon Theatre, CBS Radio Playhouse No. 2
- Address: 251–257 West 45th Street; New York City; United States
- Owner: Marcus Klaw
- Operator: Klaw Theatre Corporation
- Capacity: 805
- Type: Broadway

Construction
- Opened: 1921
- Demolished: 1954
- Years active: 1921–1953
- Architect: Eugene De Rosa

The Klaw Theatre was a Broadway theatre located at 251–257 West 45th Street (now a part of George Abbott Way) in Midtown Manhattan. Built in 1921 for producer Marcus Klaw, the theater was designed by Eugene De Rosa. Rachel Crothers' Nice People was the opening production on 2 March 1921 with Tallulah Bankhead and Katharine Cornell in her debut Broadway role albeit a small one.

As the Klaw Theatre and later the Avon few productions had a very long run. Exceptions were the comedy Meet the Wife running for 232 performances in 1923 with Humphrey Bogart as juvenile lead Gregory Brown and playwright Hatcher Hughes's melodrama Hell-Bent Fer Heaven running for 122 performances in 1924 and winning the Pulitzer Prize for Drama in 1924. Arnold Schoenberg's musical composition Pierrot Lunaire was performed for the first time in the western hemisphere at the Klaw on February 4, 1923, with George Gershwin and Carl Ruggles in attendance. On November 28, 1926 Martha Graham and others in her company gave a dance recital at the Klaw, they were accompanied by pianist Louis Horst. Maxwell Anderson's Gypsy, directed by George Cukor, had a short run of 64 performances from January 14, 1929, to March 1929 but was included in Burns Mantle's The Best Plays of 1928 - 1929.

It was renamed the Avon Theatre in 1929. Strictly Dishonorable, written by Preston Sturges, had the longest run at the Avon of 557 performances from September, 1929 to January, 1931. George Bernard Shaw, Noël Coward and Oscar Wilde had their works staged at both the Klaw and Avon.

It was leased to CBS in 1934 and renamed the CBS Radio Playhouse No. 2. CBS later bought it. In 1953 CBS sold it, the new owners razed it and built a parking deck on the site, which abutted the Imperial Theatre.

== Notable productions ==
As the Klaw Theatre:

- Nice People (1921)
- The Last Warning (1922)
- The Breaking Point (1923)
- Meet the Wife (1923)
- Hell-Bent Fer Heaven (1924)
- Scotch Mist (1926)
- Merry-Go-Round (1927)
- The Breaks (1928)
- Gypsy (1929)

As the Avon Theatre:

- Strictly Dishonorable (1929)
- Hay Fever (1931)
- The Wives of Henry VIII (1931)

== Musical performances hosted at the Klaw Theatre ==
The International Composers' Guild held their second series of concerts here in 1922–1923. These performances included a number of world or American premieres.

- 17 December 1922: World Premiere of Angels by Carl Ruggles
- 4 February 1923: American premiere of Pierrot Lunaire by Arnold Schoenberg;
- 4 March 1923: World Premiere of Hyperprism by Edgard Varèse
