= Old Lady 31 =

1920 film by John Ince

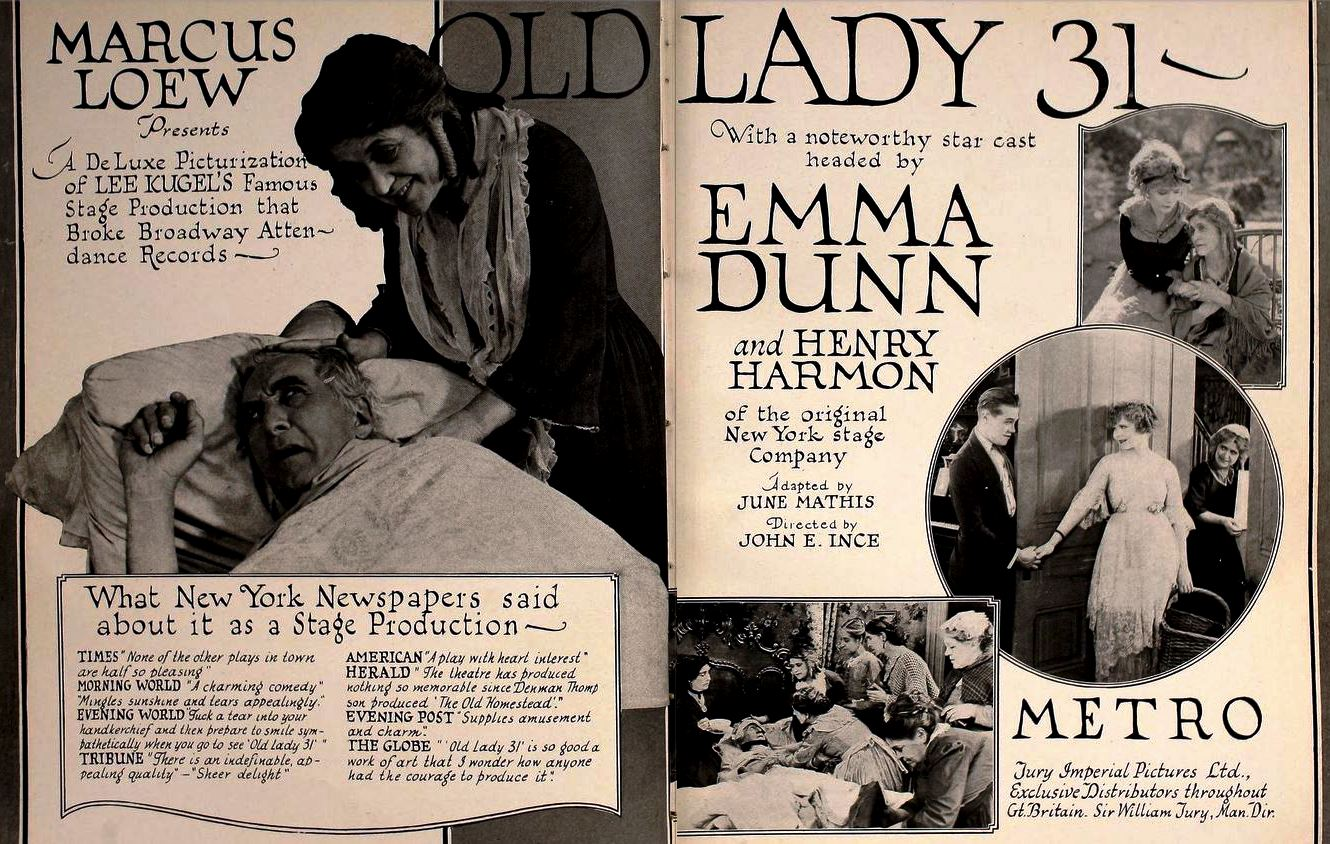
- Ad for film
- Directed by: John Ince; Sherry Harris (asst. director)
- Written by: Louise Forsslund (novel); Rachel Crothers (play); June Mathis (scenario)
- Produced by: Marcus Loew
- Starring: Emma Dunn
- Cinematography: William Beckway
- Distributed by: Metro Pictures
- Release date: May 23, 1920
- Running time: 6 reels
- Country: United States
- Language: Silent (English intertitles)

Old Lady 31 is a 1920 American silent comedy-drama film produced and distributed by Metro Pictures and directed by John Ince. It is based on a novel by Louise Forsslund that was turned into a play by Rachel Crothers. The film starred actress Emma Dunn reprising her 1916 stage success for the screen. The film was remade in 1940 as The Captain Is a Lady.

== Plot ==
Based upon a summary of the plot in a review in a film publication, Angie (Dunn) and Abe (Harmon) have been married for many years when bad investments force them to sell their homestead. Angie is to go to the old ladies' home while Abe is to go to live on the poor farm. When the twenty-nine inmates of the old ladies' home see how hard it is for the couple to part, they agree to take Abe in, and he is listed on their roster as "Old Lady 31." There are several comic situations as Abe wins his way into the hearts of his female companions. When some apparently worthless mining stock is found to have some value, the couple are able to return to their home.

== Cast ==
- Emma Dunn as Angie
- Henry Harmon as Captain Abe Rose
- Clara Knott as Blossy
- Carrie Clark Ward as Abigail
- Sadie Gordon as Nancy
- Winifred Westover as Mary
- Antrim Short as John
- Lawrence Underwood as Captain Samuel Darby
- Graham Pettie as Mke
- Martha Mattox as Sarah Jane
- Mai Wells as Mrs. Homans
- Ruby Lafayette as Granny
