= The Royal Pauper =

The Royal Pauper (aka:The Princess from the Poorhouse)
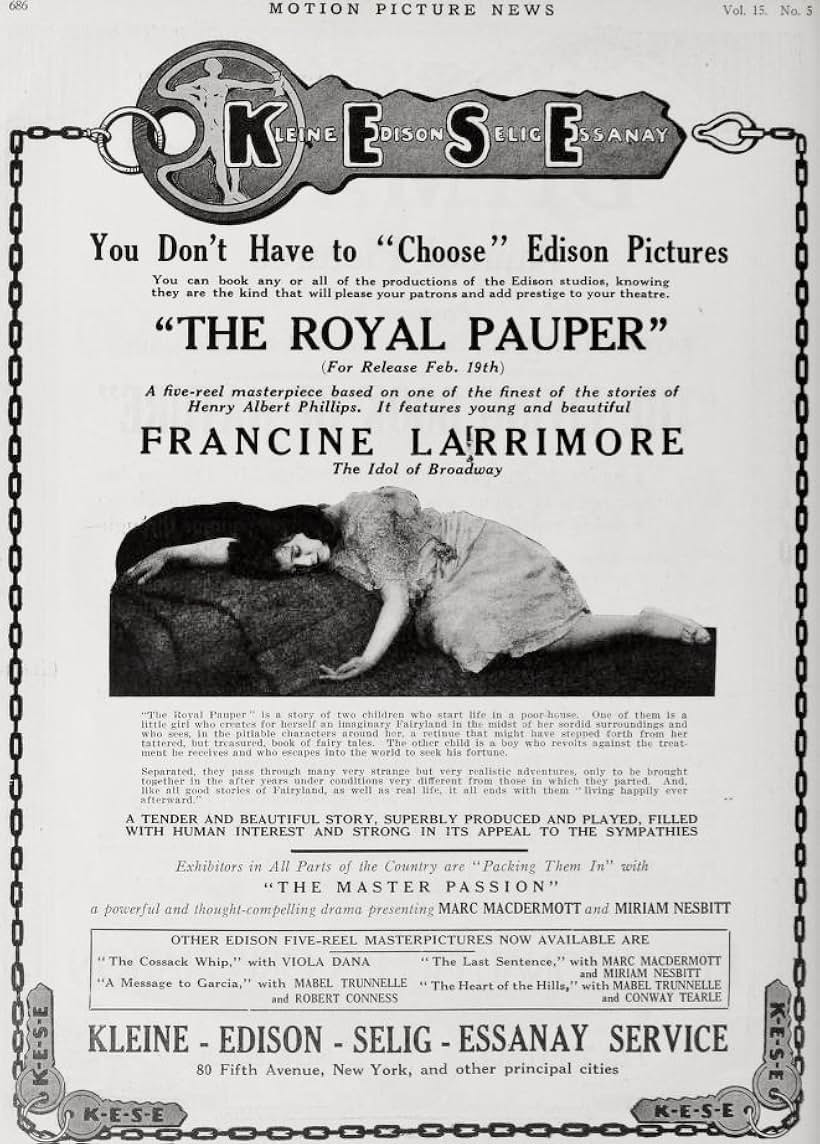
- Directed by: Ben Turbett
- Written by: Henry Albert Phillips (story); Paul Sloane (scenario)
- Produced by: Thomas A. Edison, Inc.
- Release date: February 19, 1917
- Country: United States
- Language: Silent (English intertitles)

The Royal Pauper is a 1917 American silent drama film starring Francine Larrimore and Richard Tucker. It was directed by Ben Turbett.

The film is preserved in the collections of the Library of Congress and UCLA Film & Television Archive.

== Cast ==
- Francine Larrimore as Irene, the Princess
- Walter Bauer as William, The Prince Charming, at 15
- Richard Tucker as William, The Prince Charming, at 21
- William Wadsworth as Muggins, the King
- H.H. Pattee as Mr. Chandler, the Ogre (as Herbert Pattee)
- Nellie Grant as Mrs. Chandler, the Fairy Godmother
- Leo Gordon as Carruthers, the Wicked Suitor
- Helen Strickland as Mrs. Bunty, the Witch
- Charles Sutton as Supt. of the Chandler Mills
