= Sayville, New York =

- Hamlet and census-designated place
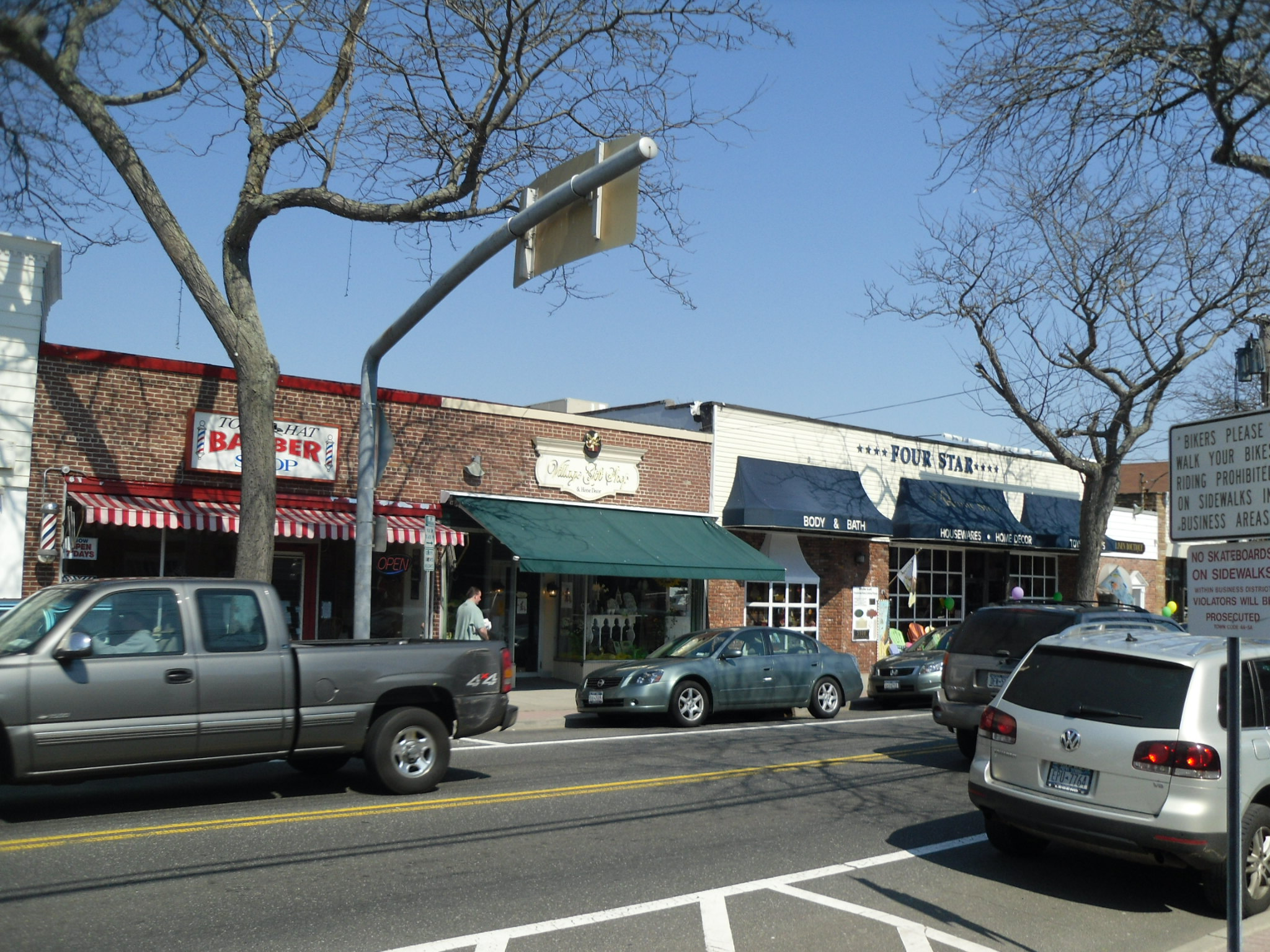
- Downtown Sayville in 2010

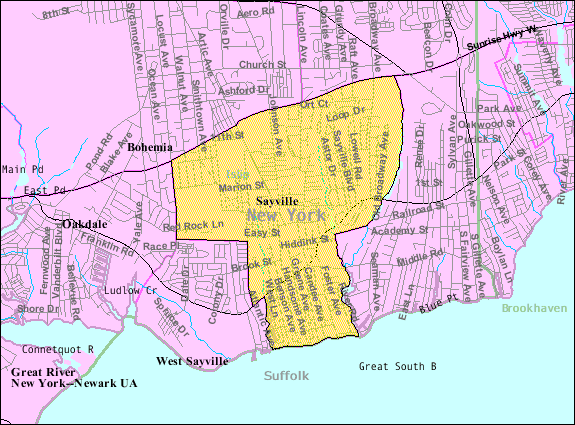
- U.S. Census map

- Location on Long Island Location within the state of New York
- Coordinates: 40°44′47″N 73°4′52″W
- Country: United States
- State: New York
- County: Suffolk
- Town: Islip

Area
  - Total: 5.38 sq mi (13.93 km^{2})
  - Land: 5.31 sq mi (13.76 km^{2})
  - Water: 0.066 sq mi (0.17 km^{2})
- Elevation: 20 ft (6 m)

Population (2020)
  - Total: 48,256
  - Density: 3,118.7/sq mi (1,204.15/km^{2})
- Time zone: UTC-5 (Eastern (EST))
  - Summer (DST): UTC-4 (EDT)
- ZIP code: 11782
- Area codes: 631, 934
- FIPS code: 36-65409
- GNIS feature ID: 0964554

Sayville is a hamlet and census-designated place in Suffolk County, New York, United States. Located on the South Shore of Long Island in the Town of Islip, the population of the CDP was 16,569 at the time of the 2020 census.

== History ==
The earliest known inhabitants of Sayville were the Secatogue tribe of the Algonquian peoples.

Sayville was founded by John Edwards (b. 1738) of East Hampton, New York. He built his home, the first in Sayville, in 1761, located at what is now the northwest corner of Foster Avenue and Edwards Street. The house was destroyed by fire in March 1913. Another man, John Greene, settled what is now known as West Sayville in 1767.

The community had no formal name until 1838 when residents gathered to choose a name for their post office, which had opened on March 22, 1837. Until that time, Sayville was known informally as "over south." The townspeople held a meeting to decide on a name, and after Edwardsville and Greensville tied in a vote, one resident suggested "Seaville". According to historical accounts, the clerk at that particular meeting did not know how to spell and had to go home and look in an old Bible he had brought from England years before. In the Bible, the word "sea" was spelled "s-a-y", and "Sayville" became the name he sent to Washington. After the error was discovered, the community sent a letter of protest to Washington D.C.; however, the Postmaster General responded that the name should stay "Sayville", as there were many "Seaville"s in the world but no "Sayville"s. As a result, the name stuck. The claim is also sometimes made that "in some very old Bibles, the town name is also spelled 'S-a-v-i-l-l-e'"., It may be noted that until the early 19th Century, it was common in many varieties of English to pronounce "sea" so that it rhymed with "obey", and thus "Sayville" could have been a phonetic representation of how some speakers would have pronounced "Seaville."

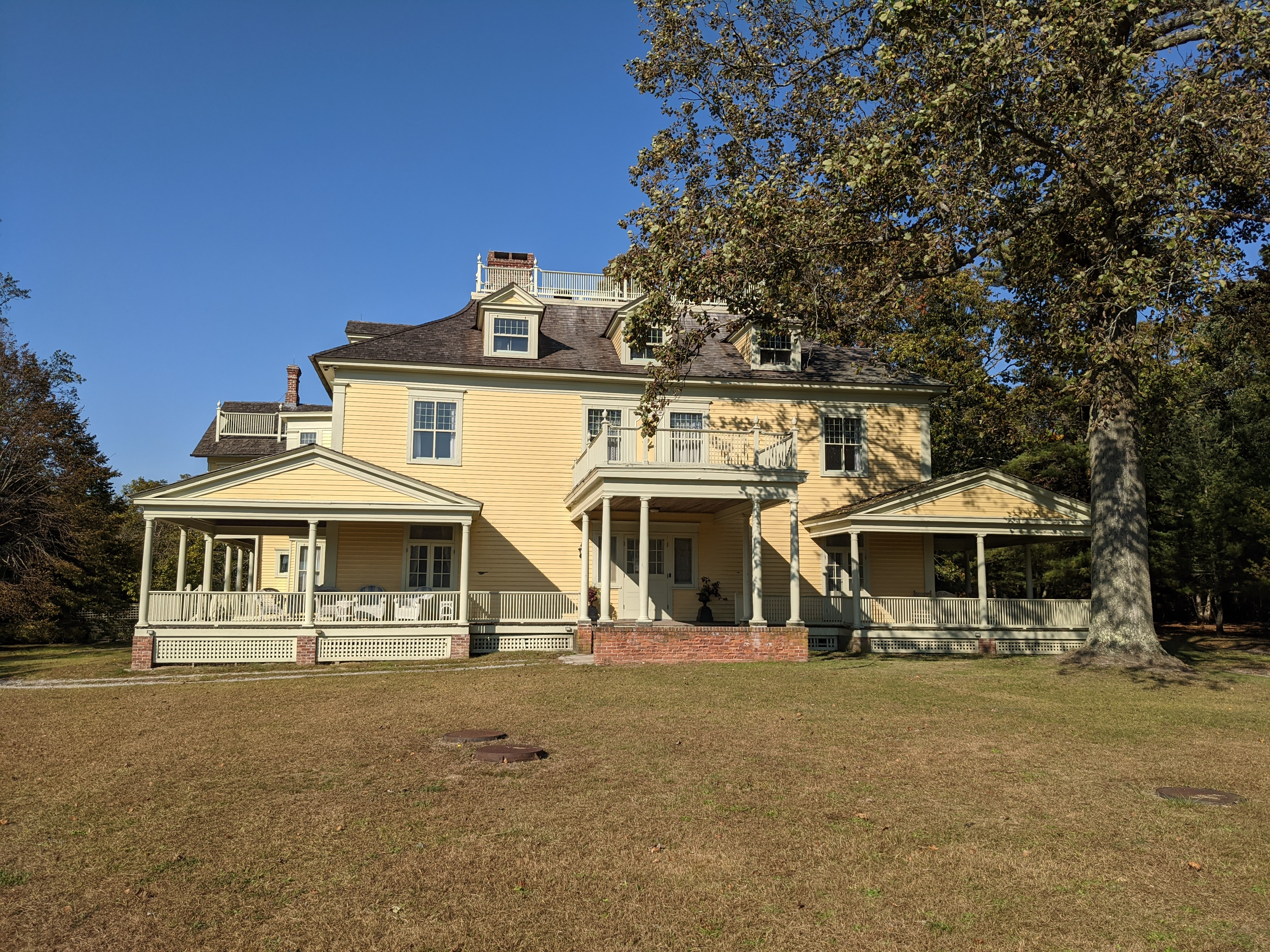
South Face of Meadow Croft

Sayville became important mainly for its timber and oysters. Beginning in 1868, when the South Side Railroad arrived, the hamlet became a summer tourist destination. Over 30 hotels were built in the area, which hosts a ferry to Fire Island. Between 1880 and 1930, many grand homes and estates were built in Sayville, including Meadow Croft, the home of John Ellis Roosevelt, a cousin of Theodore Roosevelt. Meadow Croft still stands and is part of Suffolk County's San Souci Lakes Nature Preserve.

In 1912 a German Telefunken wireless transmitter was built in Sayville (now West Sayville) to broadcast to Germany. In 1915 the transmitter allegedly relayed a message from the German embassy to "get Lucy", referring to the RMS Lusitania which was sunk on May 15. Whether the signals coming from the transmitter in Sayville authorized the attack or not, they caused concern for the US government, which dispatched Marines to ensure that encrypted messages were not sent. The station was seized by the government outright after war was declared in 1917. President Woodrow Wilson sent a contingent of Marines to seize the wireless station, making it the first hostile action taken by the United States against Germany during World War I.

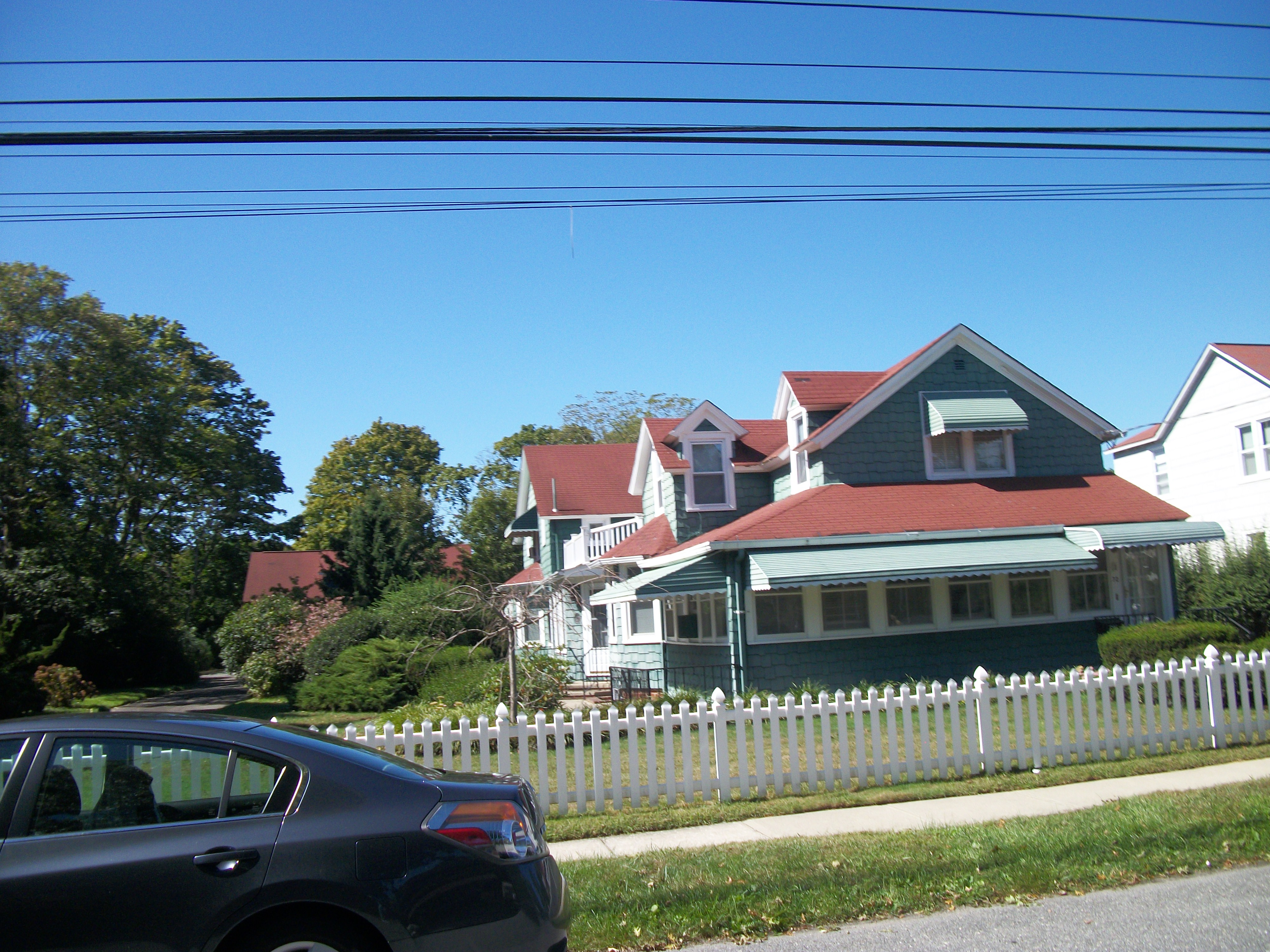
The elaborate home of the late "Father Divine" on Macon Avenue in Sayville

From 1919 to 1932 Sayville was home to Father Divine, a controversial African American religious leader who claimed to be God. His religious movement, which came to be called the International Peace Mission movement, managed a commune-like house on 72 Macon Avenue, which was the first black-owned residence in Sayville. At that time Sayville was predominantly a seasonal resort, and Father Divine's followers made good livings as native house sitters. Because followers turned over all of their profits to Father Divine, he was able to build several expansions on the house. He even bought an expensive Cadillac when neighbors complained about his noisy Hudson automobile.

Father Divine's ostentation annoyed the middle-class residents. Excess traffic that Father Divine attracted made him unpopular even to businesses he patronized with large cash purchases. Following a June 1932 trial and prison sentence for disturbing the peace, Father Divine moved to Harlem, New York, claiming that Sayville was racist. However, the commune remained on Macon Avenue for many years. Father Divine occasionally preached in Sayville afterward, but the home was only an outpost of his movement, not its headquarters.

On January 27, 1992, a 20-year-old man was charged with arson following a fire that destroyed 19th century buildings on Main Street. In August of that same year, Louis Gelsomino, an 18 year old on the Sayville volunteer fire department was charged with two counts of murder and five counts of arson for starting the previous fire.

In 1994, California State University at Fresno designated Sayville the "friendliest town in America".

In early March 2024, the Sayville United Methodist Church received criticism for one of its signs that contained the phrase, "Heaven has strict immigration laws. Hell has open borders". After being questioned by News 12 Long Island, the pastor was unaware and furious of the sign's existence. The man responsible for the message was later removed from the church's "sign ministry".

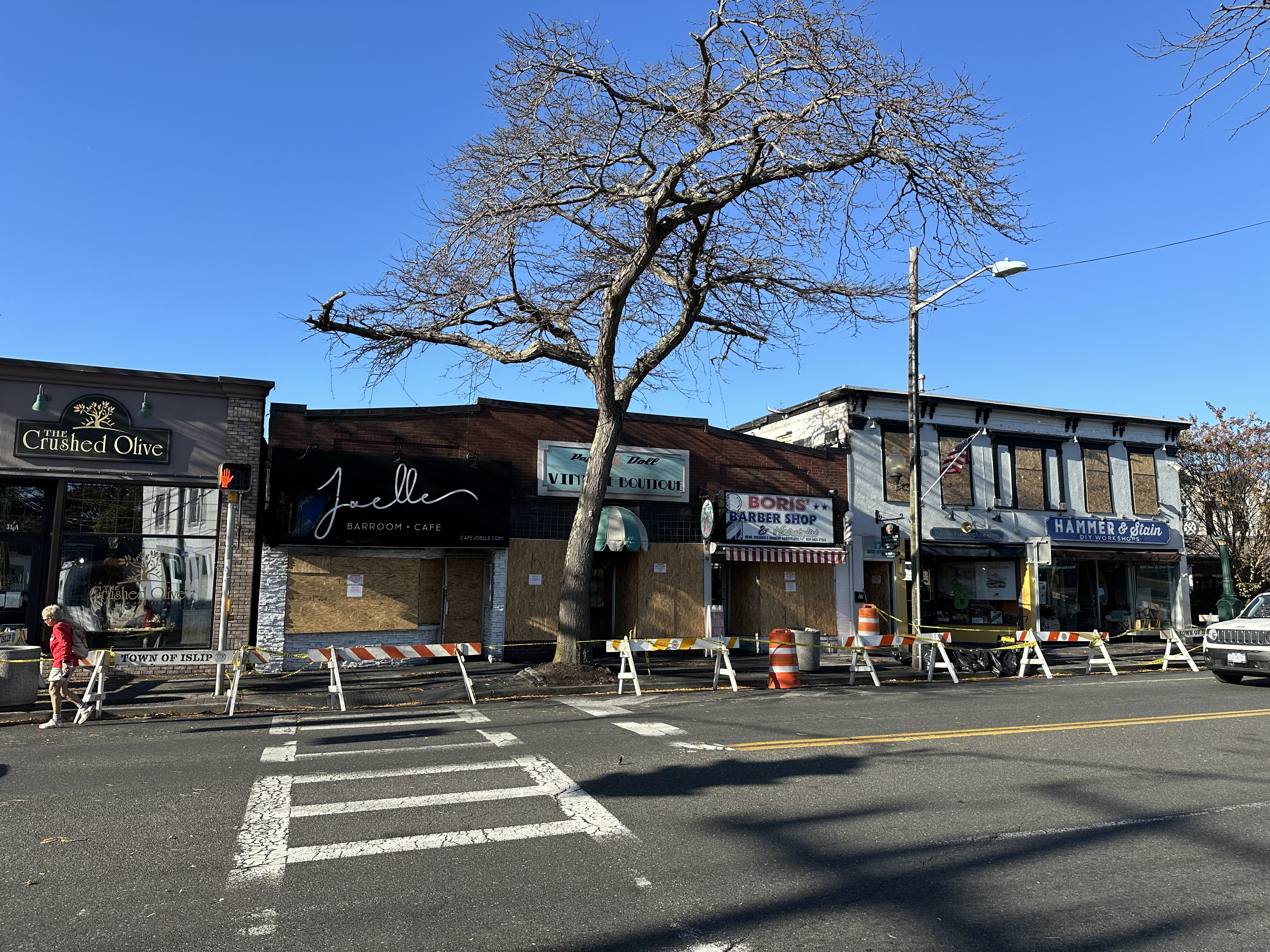
The aftermath of the fire that occurred in Sayville, New York on October 25, 2024.

On October 25, 2024, around 5:30 P.M., multiple stores on Sayville's Main Street were caught in a fire, with six of the stores damaged. The cause of this two hour long fire is currently unknown, though a "Sayville Main Street Fire Relief Fund" was made by the Greater Sayville Chamber of Commerce to help affected businesses.

Sayville is the embarkation point for ferries to the Fire Island communities of Cherry Grove and Fire Island Pines, both popular vacation communities for LGBT New Yorkers, as well as to Sailors Haven, which includes the Sunken Forest.

The Sayville train station is on the Montauk branch of the Long Island Rail Road and has connections to the ferries via taxi and van services. Suffolk County Transit also provides bus service in Sayville via Montauk Highway.

== Geography ==
The community borders the Great South Bay.

The hamlet is bordered by the bay to the south, Sunrise Highway to the north, Brown Creek to the east, and Greenes Creek to the west.

According to the United States Census Bureau, Sayville CDP has a total area of 5.4 square miles (13.9 km^{2}), of which 5.3 square miles (13.7 km^{2}) is land and 0.077 square miles (0.2 km^{2}) (1.21%) is water.

Sayville is also home to the Sayville National Wildlife Refuge, a 127-acre refuge operated by the U.S. Fish and Wildlife Service.

The area is served by the Sayville post office, located at 130 Greene Avenue (ZIP code 11782-2723).

== Demographics ==
Historical population
Census	Pop.	Note	%±
2000	16,735		—
2010	16,853		0.7%
2020	16,569		−1.7%
U.S. Decennial Census

=== 2020 census ===
As of the 2020 census, Sayville had a population of 16,569. The median age was 46.9 years. 19.9% of residents were under the age of 18 and 21.9% of residents were 65 years of age or older. For every 100 females there were 91.1 males, and for every 100 females age 18 and over there were 87.8 males age 18 and over.

100.0% of residents lived in urban areas, while 0.0% lived in rural areas.

There were 5,935 households in Sayville, of which 30.6% had children under the age of 18 living in them. Of all households, 58.5% were married-couple households, 12.0% were households with a male householder and no spouse or partner present, and 24.2% were households with a female householder and no spouse or partner present. About 22.1% of all households were made up of individuals and 12.1% had someone living alone who was 65 years of age or older.

There were 6,228 housing units, of which 4.7% were vacant. The homeowner vacancy rate was 1.0% and the rental vacancy rate was 8.1%.

Racial composition as of the 2020 census
Race	Number	Percent
White	14,874	89.8%
Black or African American	206	1.2%
American Indian and Alaska Native	14	0.1%
Asian	290	1.8%
Native Hawaiian and Other Pacific Islander	4	0.0%
Some other race	245	1.5%
Two or more races	936	5.6%
Hispanic or Latino (of any race)	1,148	6.9%

=== 2000 census ===
As of the census of 2000, there were 16,735 people, 5,603 households, and 4,353 families residing in the CDP. The population density was 3,028.4/mi^{2} (1,168.4/km^{2}). There were 5,721 housing units at an average density of 1,035.3/mi^{2} (399.4/km^{2}). The racial makeup of the CDP was 95.81% White, 0.72% African American, 0.04% Native American, 2.03% Asian, 0.48% from other races, and 0.92% from two or more races. Hispanic or Latino of any race were 3.02% of the population.

There were 5,603 households, out of which 40.3% had children under the age of 18 living with them, 65.2% were married couples living together, 9.5% had a female householder with no husband present, and 22.3% were non-families. 17.5% of all households were made up of individuals, and 8.0% had someone living alone who was 65 years of age or older. The average household size was 2.92 and the average family size was 3.34.

In the CDP, the population was spread out, with 27.2% under the age of 18, 6.2% from 18 to 24, 30.7% from 25 to 44, 24.1% from 45 to 64, and 11.8% who were 65 years of age or older. The median age was 37 years. For every 100 females, there were 92.6 males. For every 100 females age 18 and over, there were 88.9 males.

The median income for a household in the CDP was $75,236, and the median income for a family was $85,229. Males had a median income of $57,055 versus $35,091 for females. The per capita income for the CDP was $28,723. About 2.5% of families and 4.1% of the population were below the poverty line, including 3.6% of those under age 18 and 4.6% of those age 65 or over.

== Education ==
=== School districts ===
The Sayville School District consists of one high school, one middle school, and three elementary schools. The high school is located in West Sayville on Brook Street. The middle school is located on Johnson Avenue. The elementary schools are on Sunrise Drive, Lincoln Avenue, and Cherry Avenue, named after their respective streets. Lincoln and Sunrise Elementary Schools are both located in Sayville. Cherry Avenue Elementary School is located in West Sayville. Parts of Sayville attend Connetquot School District.

=== Library district ===
The area is served by the Sayville Public Library, located at 88 Greene Ave (ZIP code 11782-2723)

== Emergency services ==
Sayville is covered by the Sayville Fire Department, a New York State-designated fire district. The Sayville Fire Department is the volunteer fire department agency employed by the Sayville Fire District to provide fire protection for this area. This agency responds to all fire-related emergencies and motor vehicle crashes with personal injury, as well as numerous other emergency incidents within the borders of the Sayville Fire District. The Sayville Fire Department is a certified New York State fire department.

Sayville receives emergency medical services from Community Ambulance Company Inc. This volunteer ambulance company responds to all medical emergencies within the Sayville, West Sayville, Bayport, Bohemia, and Oakdale area. They are a certified New York State Department of Health, Emergency Medical Service agency that provides Advanced Life Support (ALS) care.

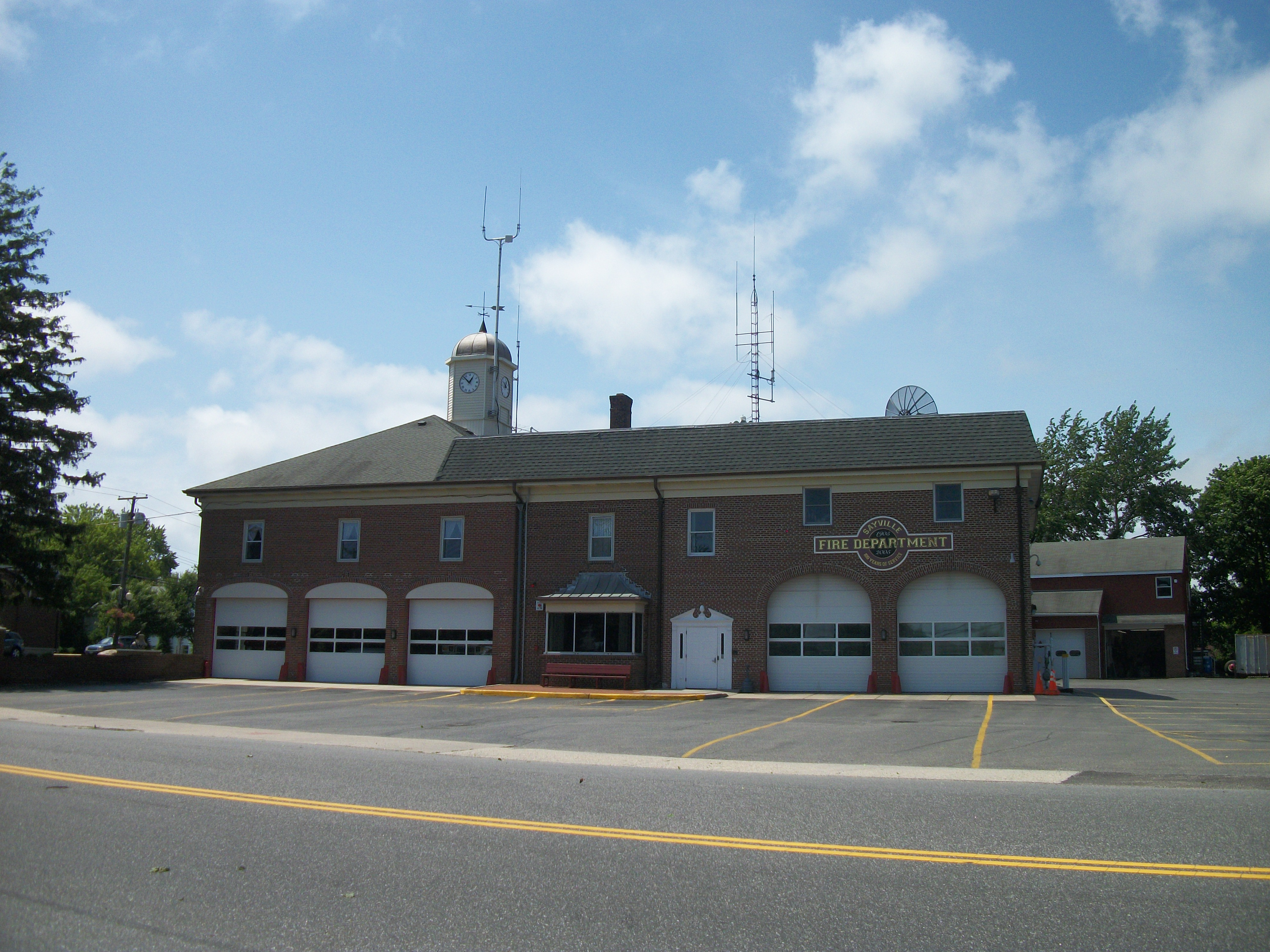
Sayville Fire Department along Lincoln Avenue just north of Montauk Highway

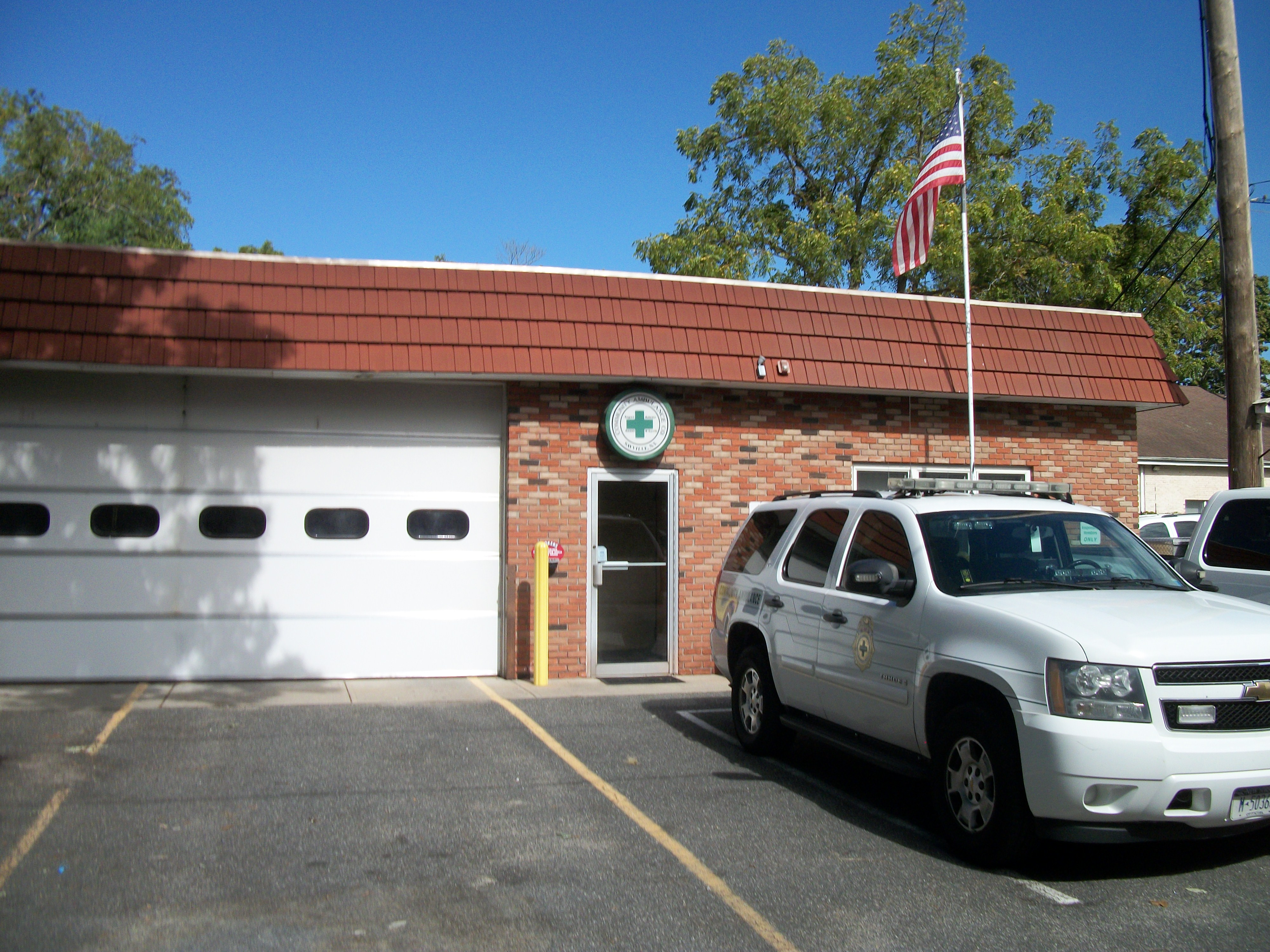
Community Ambulance Company on Swayze Street just west of Railroad Avenue in 2012. The company moved to 420 Lakeland Avenue in October 2014

== Events ==
Sayville is known for its yearly carnival known as "Sayville Summerfest" that has been re-occurring since 1979.

== Notable people ==
- Bessie Bonehill, English vaudeville performer
- Mike Buck, NFL quarterback, New Orleans Saints
- James Cantor, neuroscientist, sex researcher
- Jack Coan, football quarterback for the Wisconsin Badgers football team and subsequently the Notre Dame Fighting Irish
- Louise Forsslund (1873–1910), author
- Andrew Garbarino, politician and attorney; representative for New York's 2nd congressional district in the United States House of Representatives
- Melissa Joan Hart, actress
- Michael Jahn, Edgar Award-winning author
- Shayana D. Kadidal, civil rights lawyer
- Logan O'Hoppe, Major League Baseball catcher
- Tom Westman, winner of Survivor: Palau and contestant of Survivor: Heroes vs. Villains

== See also ==
- Sayville Yacht Club
- Sayville Congregational Church
