= He and She (play) =

Play by Rachel Crothers

He and She is a 1911 American play by Rachel Crothers who wrote a majority of her plays amidst the first wave of feminism. It tackles topics concerning masculinity and femininity, such as gender roles within a marriage and what it means to be a female artist in a patriarchal atmosphere. The play was first introduced in 1911, but failed to survive through production. However, Crothers did not abandon the project. In 1920, there was another attempt to resurrect the play's production with Crothers herself playing the female lead, though it too was ultimately unsuccessful. After over half a century, He and She was revived by the Washington Area Feminist Theatre in 1973.

According to dramaturgical scholars, it is "Crothers' most complex and pessimistic exploration of feminism's impact on society". The play features a married couple, Anne and Tom Herford, who are both sculptors. In the beginning, both characters encompass the progressive ideals for which Crothers advocated. However, when Anne wins in a competition over Tom, she is met with hostility and negativity from almost every other character. Despite showing initial support, Tom becomes increasingly agitated and says to Ann that because she is a woman, “you’re not free in the same way that I am” and that if she refuses to stop and take responsibility of their home, Tom will command her to do so. The argument is put to rest abruptly when their underage daughter announces that she is engaged and Anne makes the choice, albeit reluctantly, to care for her. Because it lacks a sense of poetic justice and the woman does not ultimately succeed, Crothers was heavily criticized for this play's ending. However, it sparked debate and discussion about what it means to be a woman or a wife.

== Plot ==
He and She revolves around the Herford family composed of Tom, Ann, and Millicent. Other characters include Ruth Creel, Ann's friend; Keith, Tom's assistant who is engaged to Ruth; Ann's father Dr. Remington; and Tom's sister Daisy who lives with the Herfords. The first act of the play is set in the sculpting studio in their house in New York City. At the beginning of the play, Tom has a frieze that he is entering into a contest. Ann thinks she can do better and enters the competition with a piece of her own. At the same time, Keith and Ruth constantly argue about marriage because Keith wants a traditional, domestic wife while Ruth wants to continue working. In act 2 (set in their living room), they nervously wait for the results of the competition. During the waiting, Ruth breaks off her engagement with Keith. When the results come, everyone starts congratulating Tom, until they find out that Tom really isn't the winner, Ann is. This causes strife between her and Tom. Ann's father is furious that she did this to her husband. To make matters worse, Millicent comes home suddenly from boarding school. In act 3, the conflicts between the characters escalate. It is revealed that Millicent has run away from school because she is engaged to the school's chauffeur. Ann believes that the only way to prevent this marriage is to give up her own sculpture to spend more time with her daughter, asking Tom to make her frieze for her.

== Historical context ==
Crothers was born and began her career amidst the first wave of feminism. She falls under the category of the "New Woman", a personified metaphor for the changes in social behavior of women of the time. The New Woman was "the social reformer in the settlement house, the factory worker, the telephone operator…all those women learning to openly question authority that neither included nor heed her". At the time, feminism was known as the suffrage movement, and the common goal of the suffragettes was attaining the right to vote. This concept was born out of the abolition movement, which sought to end slavery. Despite the oversight in humanitarian ethics, they nonetheless pushed societal boundaries to a new extreme.

The suffragettes were met with much resistance. They combated stereotypes in the media and popular culture. They often found themselves being criticized for "unladylike behavior" that challenged Victorian ideals about domesticity. Although some extreme forms of protests were seen during the movement, such as hunger strikes, and protests, most public displays by the suffragettes were quite tame. These included signing petitions, pamphlets, and pro-suffrage inspired art. Finally, after years of gender stigma, the 19th Amendment was passed in 1920, which granted women the right to vote.

== Bibliography ==
- Bisignani, Dana. "History of Feminism in the U.S.: The First Wave." The Gender Press. N.p., 23 Jan. 2015. Web. 01 Mar. 2017.
- Bowden, Peta, and Mummery, Jane. Understanding Feminism. Durham, US: Routledge, 2014. ProQuest ebrary. Web. 1 March 2017.
- Burke, Sally. American Feminist Playwrights: A Critical History. Ed. Jordan Miller. New York: Twayne Publishers, 1996. Print. Twayne's Critical History of American Drama.
- Crothers, Rachel. He and She: a play in three acts. Baker's Professional Plays, 1911, Boston Massachusetts. Print.
- Evans, Suzy. "Women Push for Equality On and Off Stage." AMERICAN THEATRE. N.p., 27 Sept. 2014. Web. 06 Apr. 2017.
- Gottlieb, Lois C. Rachel Crothers. Twaynes United States Authors Series. Ed. Eble, Kenneth. Twayne Publishers, 1979. Print.
- Johnson, Hannah. “Dr. Mrs. Marie Louise (Depaw) Crothers.” McLean County Museum of History. N.p., 2015. Web. 16 February 2017.
- Lindroth, Colette. Rachel Crothers: a Research And production Sourcebook. Westport, Conn.: Greenwood Press, 1995.
- "Pay Equity & Discrimination." Institute for Women's Policy Research. N.p., n.d. Web. 27 Feb. 2017.
- Rampton, Martha. "Four Waves of Feminism." Four Waves of Feminism | Pacific University. Pacific Magazine, 25 Oct. 2015. Web. 01 Mar. 2017.
- Shafer, Yvonne. American Women Playwrights 1900-1950. Peter Lang Publishers, 1997, New York. Print.
