= Lynn Starling =

American screenwriter

- Born: William Lyne Starling; September 13, 1888; Hopkinsville, Kentucky, United States
- Died: February 25, 1955 (aged 66); Los Angeles, California; United States
- Occupations: Actor, Playwright, Screenwriter

William Lyne Starling (September 13, 1888 – February 25, 1955), known professionally as Lynn Starling, was an American playwright, actor, and screenwriter. Born in Hopkinsville, Kentucky, he graduated from Centre College and had roles in plays such as Treasure Island and The Famous Mrs. Fair. Starling wrote the 1923 play Meet the Wife, subsequently adapted into a 1931 film of the same title.

== Selected filmography ==
- The Time, the Place and the Girl (1946)
- Three Little Girls in Blue (1946)
- It's a Pleasure (1945)
- The Impostor (1944)
- Footlight Serenade (1942)
- Moon Over Miami (1941)
- He Married His Wife (1940)
- Three Blind Mice (1938)
- Women of Glamour (1937)
- More Than a Secretary (1936)
- Give Us This Night (1936)
- Shanghai (1935)
- Down to Their Last Yacht (1934)
- Torch Singer (1933)
- Love Time (1934)
- Cynara (1932)
- Back Street (1932)
- Transatlantic (1931)
- Always Goodbye (1931)
- Don't Bet on Women (1931)
- Dumbbells in Ermine (1930)
- Oh, for a Man! (1930)

== Bibliography ==
- Solomon, Aubrey. The Fox Film Corporation, 1915-1935: A History and Filmography. McFarland, 2011.
