= Gypsy (1929 play) =

1929 Broadway play

- Written by: Maxwell Anderson
- Original language: English
- Genre: Drama
- Setting: Hastings' apartment, New York City

Premiere
- Date premiered: January 14, 1929
- Place premiered: Klaw Theatre; New York City, New York

Gypsy was a 1929 Broadway three-act play written by Maxwell Anderson and produced by Richard Herndon. Directed by George Cukor, the production ran for 64 performances from January 14, 1929, to March 1929 at the Klaw Theatre. It was included in Burns Mantle's The Best Plays of 1928-1929.

== Cast ==
- Louis Calhern as Cleve
- Ruth Findlay as Sylvia
- Wallace Ford as Mac
- Claiborne Foster as Ellen
- Jefferson Hall as Janitor
- Lester Vail as David
- Mary Young as Marilyn
