= Sayville Congregational Church =

Historic church in New York, United States

- U.S. National Register of Historic Places
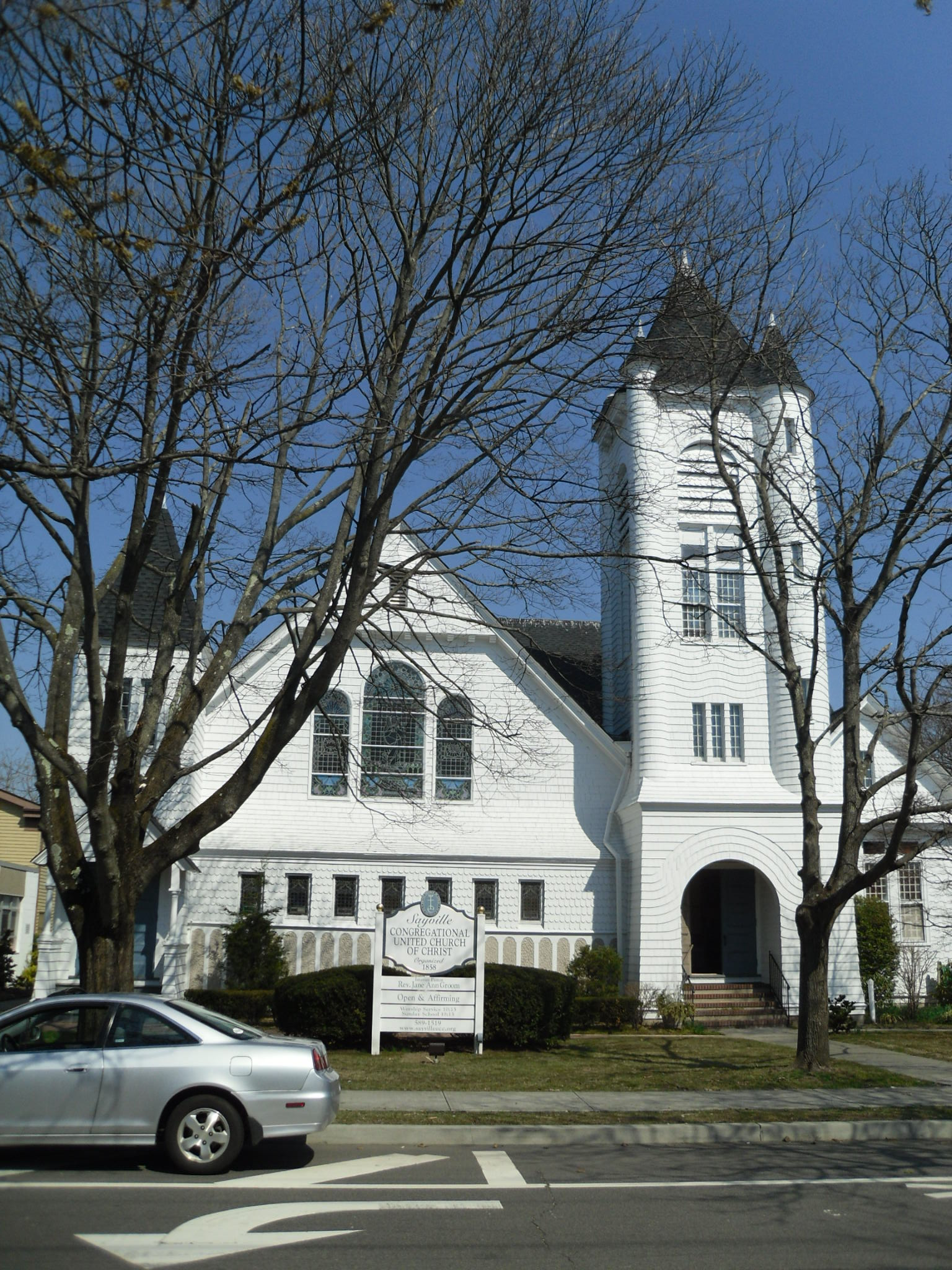
- Sayville Congregational Church, March 2010

- Location within New York Location within the United States
- Location: 131 Middle Rd., Sayville, New York
- Coordinates: 40°44′11″N 73°4′50″W
- Area: less than one acre
- Architect: Isaac Green, Jr.; Robert Nunns
- Architectural style: Shingle Style
- MPS: Isaac Henry Green, Jr. Suffolk and Nassau Counties, New York MPS
- NRHP reference No.: 05000747
- Added to NRHP: July 27, 2005

Sayville Congregational Church, also known as Sayville Congregational United Church of Christ, is a historic Congregational church at 131 Middle Road in Sayville, Suffolk County, New York. It was built in 1888 and is a Shingle Style building with a cross gabled roof, two prominent towers, and fish-scale shingles. It features a three-story, square bell tower with rounded, turret-like corners.

It was added to the National Register of Historic Places in 2005.
