= Nice People (film) =

1922 film by William C. deMille

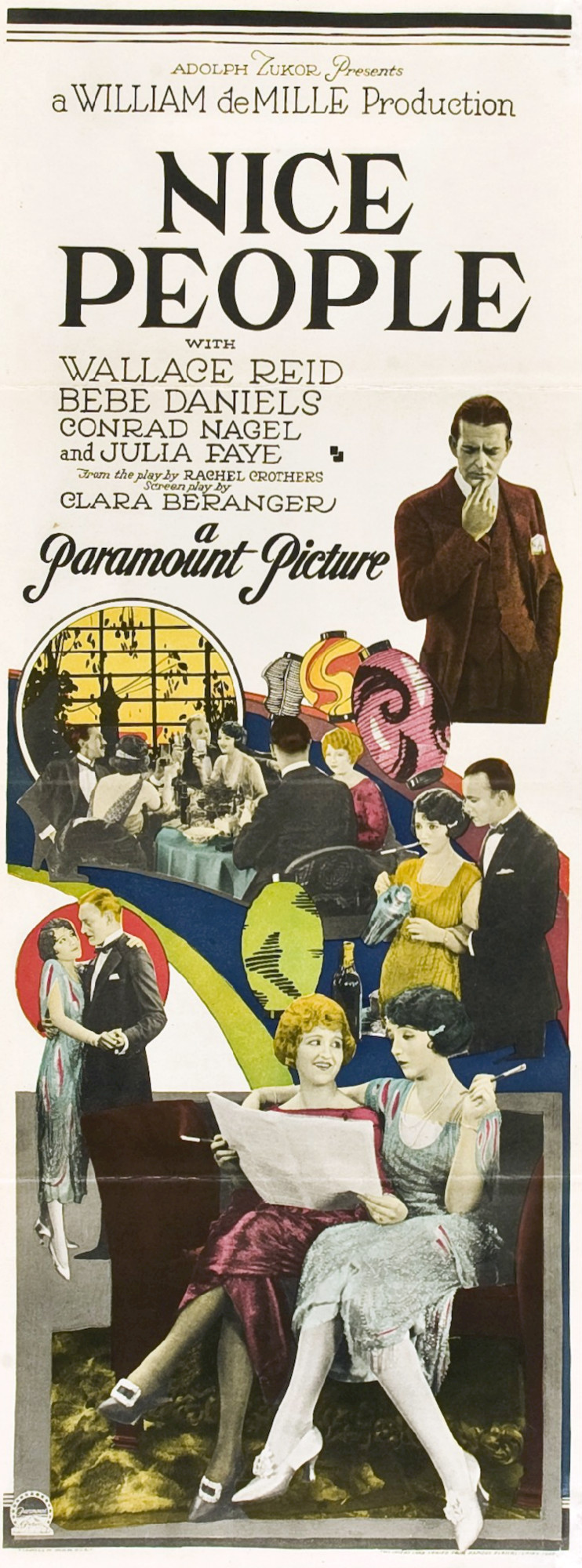
- Movie poster
- Directed by: William C. deMille
- Written by: Clara Beranger (scenario)
- Based on: Nice People by Rachel Crothers
- Produced by: Adolph Zukor
- Starring: Wallace Reid; Bebe Daniels; Julia Faye
- Cinematography: L. Guy Wilky
- Production company: Famous Players–Lasky
- Distributed by: Paramount Pictures
- Release date: September 3, 1922
- Running time: 70 minutes (7 reels)
- Country: United States
- Language: Silent (English intertitles)

Nice People is a 1922 American silent drama film directed by William C. deMille and starring Wallace Reid and Bebe Daniels. The movie is based on the 1921 Broadway play of the same name by Rachel Crothers that had starred Tallulah Bankhead, Francine Larrimore, and Katharine Cornell. Vincent Coleman played Reid's part of the Captain.

== Cast ==
- Wallace Reid as Captain Billy Wade
- Bebe Daniels as Theodora Gloucester (played by Francine Larrimore on Broadway)
- Conrad Nagel as Scotty White
- Julia Faye as Hallie Livingston (played by Tallulah Bankhead on Broadway)
- Claire McDowell as Margaret Rainsford
- Edward Martindel as Hubert Gloucester
- Eve Southern as Eileen Baxter-Jones (played by Katharine Cornell on Broadway)
- Bertram Johns as Trevor Leeds
- William Boyd as Oliver Comstock
- Ethel Wales as Mrs. Heyfer

== Preservation ==
With no prints of Nice People located in any film archives, it is considered a lost film.

== See also ==
- The House That Shadows Built (1931 promotional film by Paramount with excerpt of this film)
- Wallace Reid filmography
