= The Breaking Point (play) =

- Original language: English
- Written by: Mary Roberts Rinehart
- Genre: Drama
- Setting: home of Dr. Livingston and the Clark Ranch in Norada, Wyoming

Premiere
- Date: August 16, 1923
- Place: Klaw Theatre; New York City, New York

The Breaking Point was a 1923 Broadway three-act drama written by Mary Roberts Rinehart, produced by Wagenhals and Collin Kemper and staged by Kemper.

The play ran for 68 performances from August 16, 1923 to October 1923 at the Klaw Theatre, and was based on Rinehart's 1922 novel of the same name.

== Cast ==
- Reginald Barlow as Dr. Miller
- Gail Kane as Beverly
- Robert Barrat as Bassett
- Zeffie Tilbury as Lucy
- Maurice Darcy as Joe
- John Doyle as David
- Stephen Maley as Bill
- McKay Morris as Dick
- John Morrissey as sheriff
- Lucille Sears as Clare
- Marie Valray as Indian woman
- Robert Vaughn as Curley and as Riley
- Regina Wallace as Elizabeth
