= The Captain Is a Lady =

1940 film directed by Robert B. Sinclair

- Theatrical release poster
- Directed by: Robert B. Sinclair
- Screenplay by: Henry Clark
- Based on: Old Lady 31; 1916 play by Rachel Crothers; 1909 play by Louise Forsslund
- Produced by: Frederick Stephani
- Starring: Charles Coburn; Beulah Bondi; Virginia Grey; Helen Broderick; Billie Burke; Dan Dailey
- Cinematography: Leonard Smith
- Edited by: Frank E. Hull
- Music by: Bronislau Kaper
- Production company: Metro-Goldwyn-Mayer
- Distributed by: Loew's Inc.
- Release date: June 21, 1940
- Running time: 65 minutes
- Country: United States
- Language: English

The Captain Is a Lady is a 1940 American comedy film directed by Robert B. Sinclair and written by Henry Clark, adapted from the play by Rachel Crothers. The film stars Charles Coburn, Beulah Bondi, Virginia Grey, Helen Broderick, Billie Burke and Dan Dailey. It was released on June 21, 1940, by Metro-Goldwyn-Mayer.

== Plot ==
Captain Peabody and his wife Angie are kicked out of their home, Angie finds a place at a retirement home. Unfortunately, only single women are allowed to stay, so the captain has to find a place of his own and say goodbye to Angie. But then, the ladies from the retirement home feel bad for the couple and let them both in. The captain now sees himself surrounded only by ladies and being called "Old lady" by his crew-mates and wants his manhood back.

== Cast ==
- Charles Coburn as Captain Abe Peabody
- Beulah Bondi as Angie Peabody
- Virginia Grey as Mary Peabody
- Helen Broderick as Nancy Crocker
- Billie Burke as Blossy Stort
- Dan Dailey as Perth Nickerson
- Helen Westley as Abigail Morrow
- Cecil Cunningham as Mrs. Jane Homans
- Marjorie Main as Sarah May Willett
- Clem Bevans as Samuel Darby
- Francis Pierlot as Roger Bartlett
- Tom Fadden as Pucey Kintner
