= Claiborne Foster =

American actress (1896–1981)

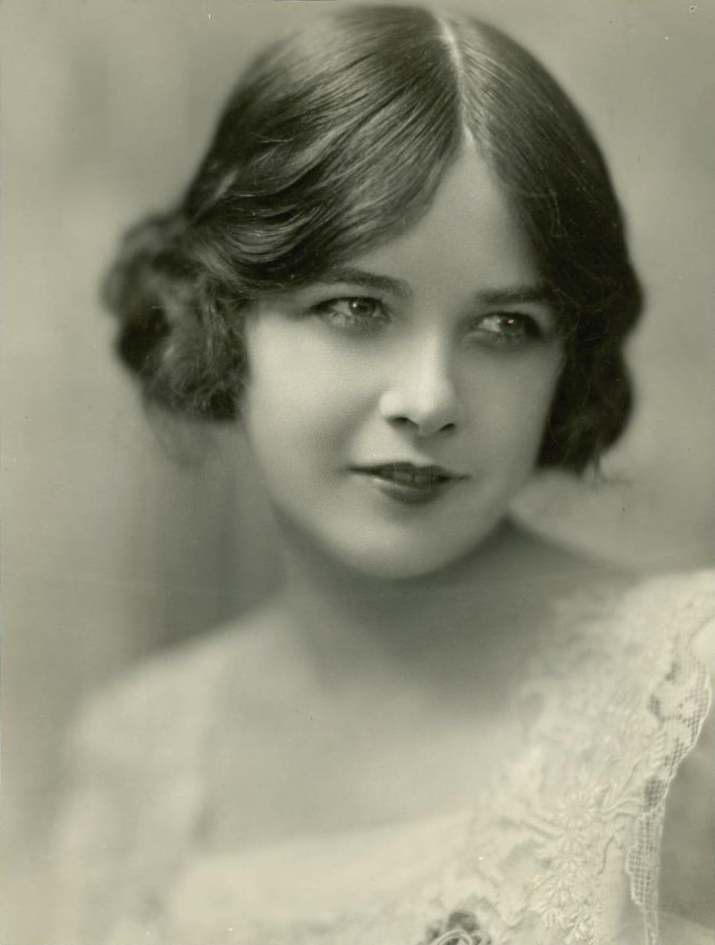
- Foster in "Applesauce", 1924
- Born: Claiborne Foster Comegys; April 15, 1896; Shreveport, Louisiana
- Died: February 21, 1981 (aged 84); Fort Myers, Florida
- Other names: Claiborne Foster Cresap, Claiborne Foster Rice, Claiborne Foster Foulds
- Occupation: Actress

Claiborne Foster (April 15, 1896 – February 21, 1981) was an American stage actress, born Claiborne Foster Comegys.

== Early life ==
Claiborne Foster Comegys was born in Shreveport, Louisiana, the daughter of Thomas McLoyd Comegys and Mary Elinor "Nell" Foster Comegys. Her father was a dentist. Her aunt was the suffragist Lucille Foster McMillin, and her uncle was diplomat Benton McMillin. Her older sister Kathleen Foster Comegys (1893–1984) was also an actress.

== Career ==
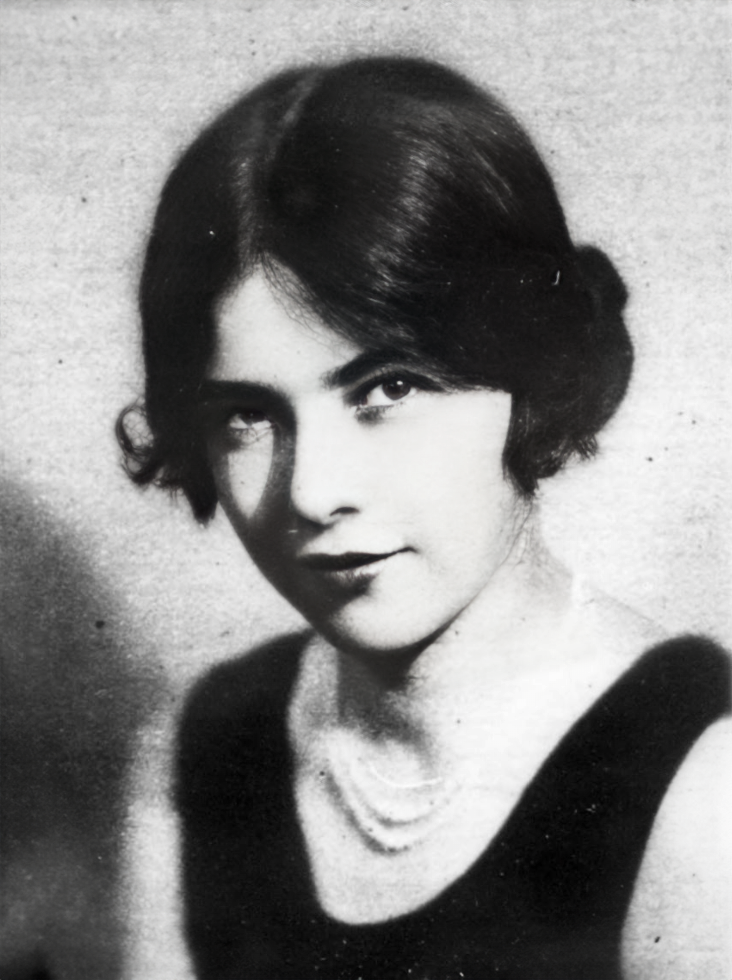
Foster in "Gypsy", c. 1929

Foster's Broadway and other major stage credits included roles in The Blue Bird (1910), Romance (1913), Miss Daisy (1914), A Full House (1914), Cousin Lucy (1915), Abe and Mawruss (1915–1916), The Girl in the Limousine (1919–1920), Ladies' Night (1920–1921), Two Fellows and a Girl (1923), Applesauce (1924), The Lady Killer (1924), Cheaper to Marry (1924), The Patsy (1925), Sinner (1927), Trigger (1927), Eva the Fifth (1928), Gypsy (1929), Other Men's Wives (1929), Blind Mice (1930), A Widow in Green (1931), And Shadows Fall (1945), Dearly Beloved, Mr. Sycamore, and Cat on a Hot Tin Roof (1956). She also wrote the Broadway shows On the Wing and Pretty Little Parlor (1944).

In 1936, Foster survived a fatal plane crash in Trinidad. After she retired from the stage, Foster produced a program at WINK-TV in Fort Myers, Florida.

== Personal life ==
In 1915, Claiborne Foster married naval lieutenant James McDowell Cresap. He died in the 1918 influenza pandemic. Her second husband was Maxwell Jay Rice, an airline executive. They married in 1932, and moved to Rio de Janeiro; she was widowed a second time when Rice died in 1943. Her third husband was Ned F. Foulds. She was widowed a third time when Foulds died in 1978. She died in 1981, aged 84 years, in Fort Myers.
