= Max Wants a Divorce =

- Directed by: Max Linder
- Written by: Max Linder
- Starring: See below
- Production company: Essanay Studios
- Distributed by: Essanay Studios
- Release date: March 26, 1917
- Running time: 2 reels
- Country: United States
- Languages: Silent; English language intertitles

Max Wants a Divorce is a 1917 American short film directed by Max Linder.

== Plot ==
Max is forced to choose between losing his newly-wedded wife and a fortune. He hits upon a brilliant scheme: He will give his wife grounds for a divorce, secure the money, and then make his ex-wife Mrs. Linder again. He goes through any amount of trouble in helping her to get the necessary evidence, only to find that it is all a mistake on the part of a stupid lawyer - the money and the wife are both to be his. -- Edward Weitzel, Moving Picture World (April 7, 1917)

== Cast ==
- Max Linder as Max
- Martha Mansfield as Max's Wife (billed as Martha Early)
- Helen Ferguson
- Francine Larrimore
- Ernest Maupain
- Leo White
- Mathilde Comont as the Loony Diva

== Premiere and preservation status ==
The film premiered at the Strand Theatre in New York City on 26 March 1917. A restored print was presented by Serge Bromberg of Lobster Films at the San Francisco Silent Film Festival on 1 June 2014.

== See also ==
- List of rediscovered films
