= John Meade's Woman =

1937 film by Richard Wallace

- Directed by: Richard Wallace
- Screenplay by: John Bright; Vincent Lawrence; Herman J. Mankiewicz; Robert Tasker
- Produced by: B. P. Schulberg
- Starring: Edward Arnold; Francine Larrimore; Gail Patrick; George Bancroft; John Trent; Sidney Blackmer
- Cinematography: Harry Fischbeck
- Edited by: Robert Bischoff
- Music by: Friedrich Hollaender
- Production company: Paramount Pictures
- Distributed by: Paramount Pictures
- Release date: February 26, 1937
- Running time: 80 minutes
- Country: United States
- Language: English

John Meade's Woman is a 1937 American drama film directed by Richard Wallace and written by John Bright, Vincent Lawrence, Herman J. Mankiewicz and Robert Tasker. The film stars Edward Arnold, Francine Larrimore, Gail Patrick, George Bancroft, John Trent and Sidney Blackmer. The film was released on February 26, 1937, by Paramount Pictures.

== Cast ==
- Edward Arnold as John Meade
- Francine Larrimore as Teddy Connor
- Gail Patrick as Caroline Haig
- George Bancroft as Tim Mathews
- John Trent as Mike
- Sidney Blackmer as Rodney
- Jonathan Hale as Mr. Melton
- Aileen Pringle as Mrs. Melton
- Stanley Andrews as Westley
- Harry Hayden as Gallatin
- Robert Strange as Blaney
