= Regina Wallace =

American film and theatre actress

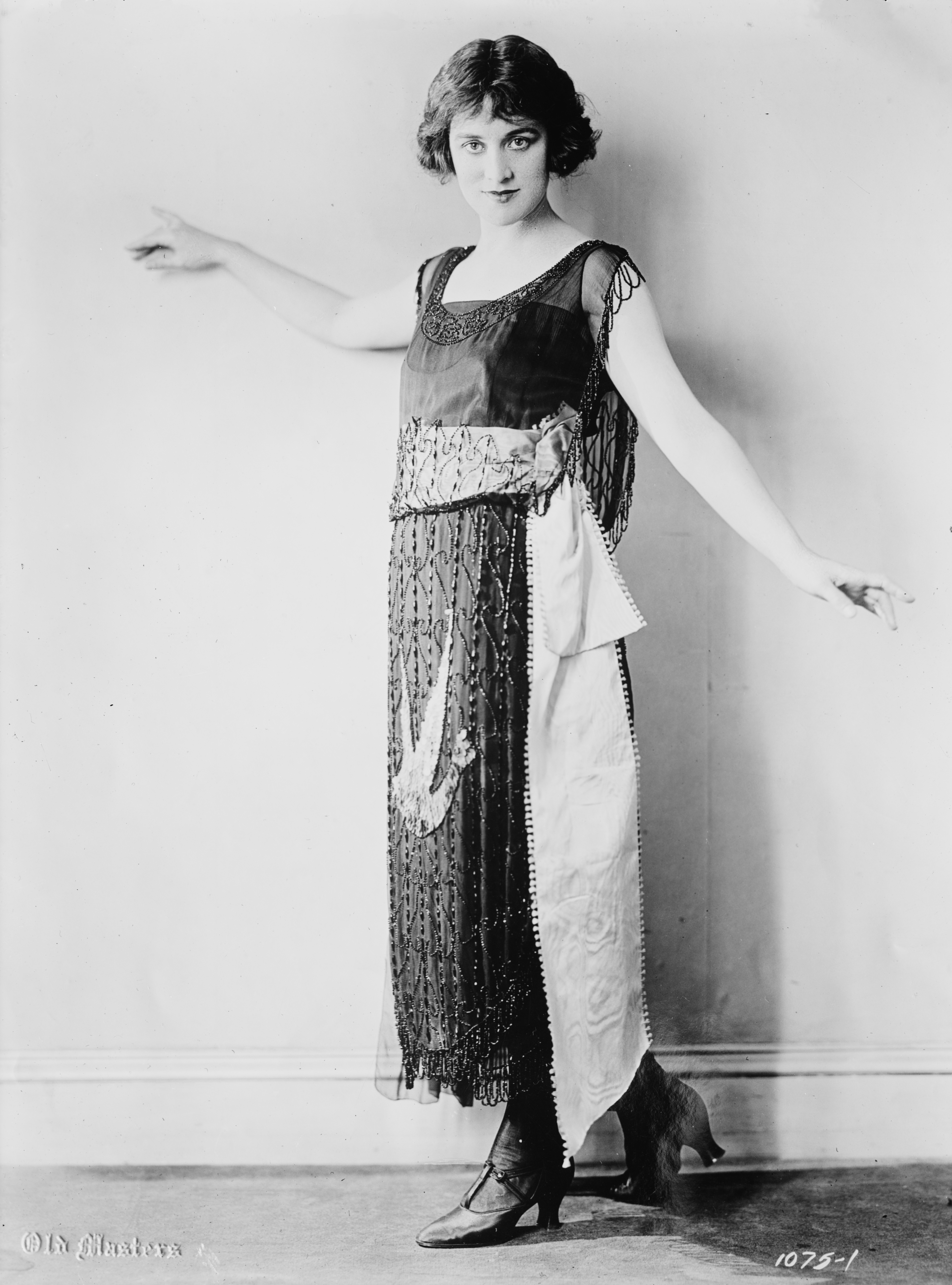
- Wallace in 1900
- Born: September 1, 1886; Trenton, New Jersey, U.S.
- Died: February 13, 1978 (aged 91); Englewood, New Jersey, U.S.
- Occupation: Actress
- Years active: 1913–1963

Regina Wallace (September 1, 1886 – February 13, 1978) was an American film and theatre actress.

== Career ==
Born in Trenton, New Jersey, Wallace began her career in 1913, performing in New York, where she appeared in the Broadway play A Good Little Devil, under the name Reggie Wallace. She also appeared in Broadway productions of Friendly Enemies, The Male Animal, The Breaking Point, The Show-Off and First Lady, among others. From 1956 to 1962 Wallace appeared in the Broadway production of My Fair Lady.

Wallace's film credits include Scattergood Rides High, Rachel and the Stranger, Mr. Skeffington, Behind Prison Walls, My Foolish Heart, Two Blondes and a Redhead, Avalanche, The Dark Corner, Sherlock Holmes in Washington and The Adventures of Martin Eden.

== Death ==
Wallace died in February 1978 of a stroke at the Actors Fund Home in Englewood, New Jersey.
