= Meet the Wife (film) =

1931 film

- Directed by: Leslie Pearce
- Written by: F. McGrew Willis; Walter DeLeon
- Based on: Meet the Wife by Lynn Starling
- Produced by: Al Christie
- Starring: Laura La Plante; Lew Cody; Joan Marsh
- Cinematography: Paul Kerschner; Charles Van Enger
- Edited by: John English
- Production company: Christie Film Company
- Distributed by: Columbia Pictures
- Release date: April 17, 1931
- Running time: 73 minutes
- Country: United States
- Language: English

Meet the Wife is a 1931 American comedy film directed by Leslie Pearce and starring Laura La Plante, Lew Cody and Joan Marsh. It is based on the 1923 Broadway play of the same title by Lynn Starling. The film's sets were designed by the art director Charles A. Cadwallader.

== Plot ==
A woman's supposedly dead first husband turns up, much to the consternation of her second husband. Meanwhile, her younger sister attempts to carry on two romances with a newspaper reporter and a wealthy Englishman.

== Cast ==
- Laura La Plante as Gertrude Lennox
- Lew Cody as Philip Lord
- Joan Marsh as Doris Bellamy
- William Janney as Gregory Brown
- Harry Myers as Harvey Lennox
- Claud Allister as Victor Staunton
- Aileen Carlyle as Alice
- Aggie Herring as Maggie
- Edgar Norton as Williams

== Bibliography ==
- Munden, Kenneth White. The American Film Institute Catalog of Motion Pictures Produced in the United States, Part 1. University of California Press, 1997.
- Walker, Brent E. Mack Sennett’s Fun Factory: A History and Filmography of His Studio and His Keystone and Mack Sennett Comedies, with Biographies of Players and Personnel. McFarland, 2013.
