= Louise Forsslund =

American author

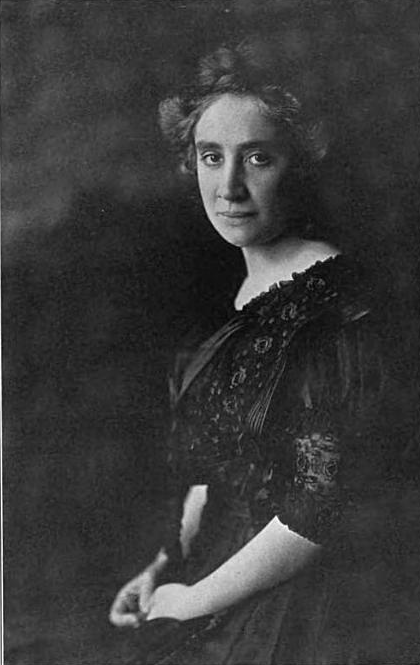
- Louise Forsslund circa 1909
- Born: 1873; Sayville, New York
- Died: May 2, 1910 (aged 36–37); Brentwood, New York
- Occupation: Author

Louise Forsslund (March 13, 1873 - May 2, 1910) was the pen name of American author Mary Louise Foster, who wrote a number of short stories and novels in the first decade of the 20th century. Forsslund was her father's surname before he Americanized it to Foster, and she incorporated some of his many experiences into her stories.

Her short stories appeared in publications including the Ladies' Home Journal, The Century Magazine, and Tom Watson's Magazine.

Her last novel, Old Lady Number 31, was turned into a play in 1916-17 and the silent film Old Lady 31 in 1920.

She was a native of Sayville, New York, and died on May 2, 1910, in nearby Brentwood, New York. She married Charles Carey Waddell in 1906, who authored The Van Suyden Sapphires under the name Charles Carey.

== Selected bibliography ==
- The Story of Sarah (1901)
- The Ship of Dreams (1902)
- Old Lady Number 31 (1909)
