= John Ellis Roosevelt Estate =

Historic house in New York, United States

- U.S. National Register of Historic Places
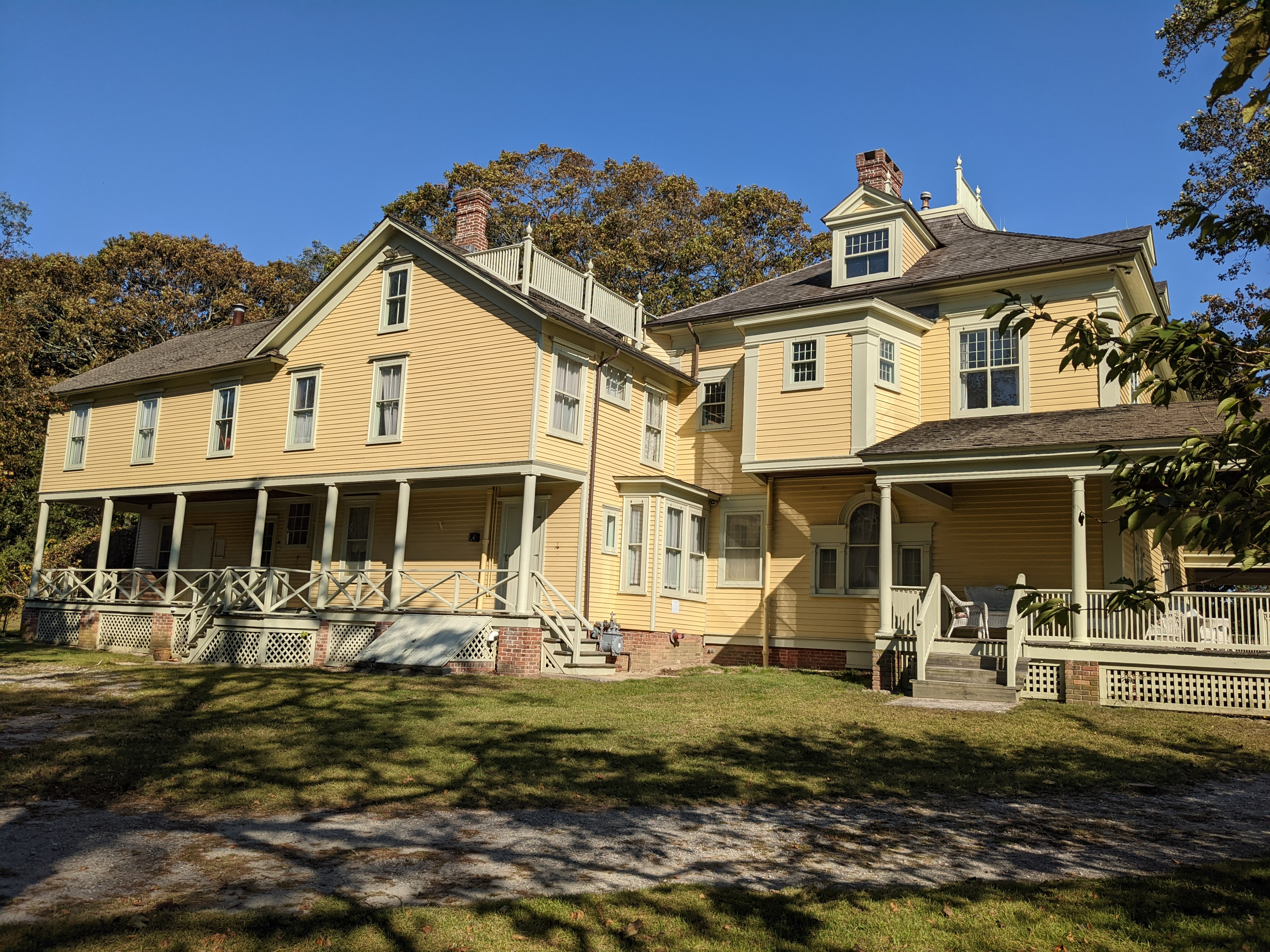
- West face, October 2020

- Location within New York Location within the United States
- Location: Middle Road, Sayville, New York
- Coordinates: 40°44′22″N 73°4′19″W
- Area: 86 acres (35 ha)
- Built: 1850
- Architect: Green, I.H.
- Architectural style: Colonial Revival
- NRHP reference No.: 87001896
- Added to NRHP: November 5, 1987

John Ellis Roosevelt Estate, also known as Meadow Croft, is a historic estate located at Sayville in Suffolk County, New York.

== History ==
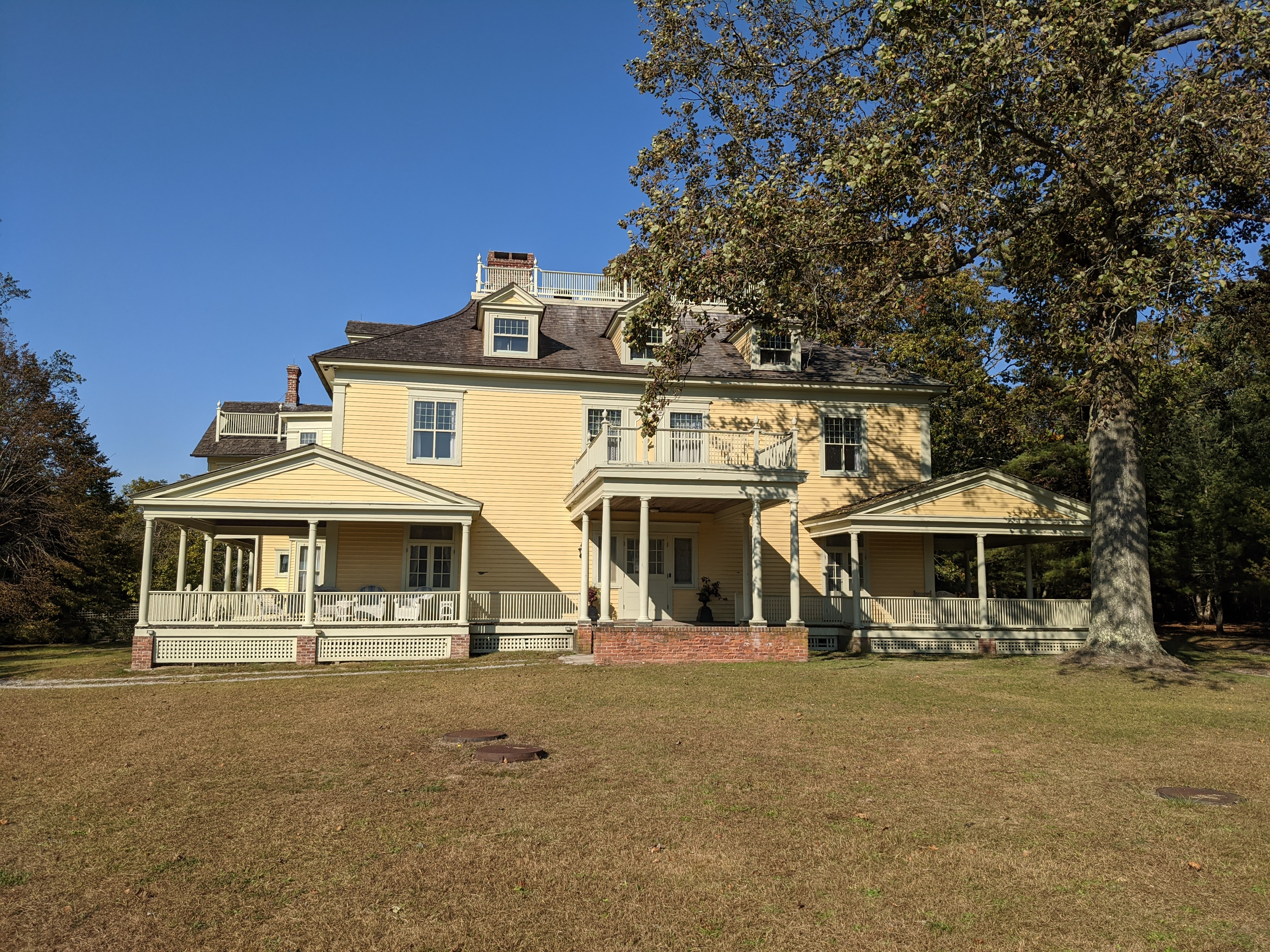
South face of the estate, October 2020

The main house, roughly L-shaped, is composed of two distinct parts: the original farmhouse, built about 1850, and now the rear of the house; and the larger, more formal Colonial Revival mansion built from 1891 to 1892 and set perpendicular to it. The original section is a two-story, rectangular farmhouse, sheathed in clapboard and surmounted by a gable roof. The 1891 to 1892 section is a clapboarded, two-story structure with an elaborate façade with generous porch and surmounted by a steeply pitched, truncated hipped roof. Also on the property are contributing carriage house, equipment barn, garage, caretaker's cottage, swimming pool, storage hut, and archaeological sites. The property was purchased by Robert Barnwell Roosevelt (1829–1906) in 1873; his son John Ellis Roosevelt (1853–1939) commissioned the estate.

In the 1960s, one of the estate's caretakers Barney Loughlin bought some of the northern land for farming and later settled on a vineyard in the 1980s, with it later being called "Loughlin's Vineyard".

=== Present day ===
The Bayport Blue Point Heritage Association has restored the mansion and offers seasonal tours and exhibits of local history. Since Barney's death in 2017, the property has been maintained by his three daughters. The vineyard is still open to the public for events as of 2026.

The estate is located on the grounds of Sans Souci County Park, and was added to the National Register of Historic Places in 1987.
