= Francine Larrimore =

American actress (1898–1975)

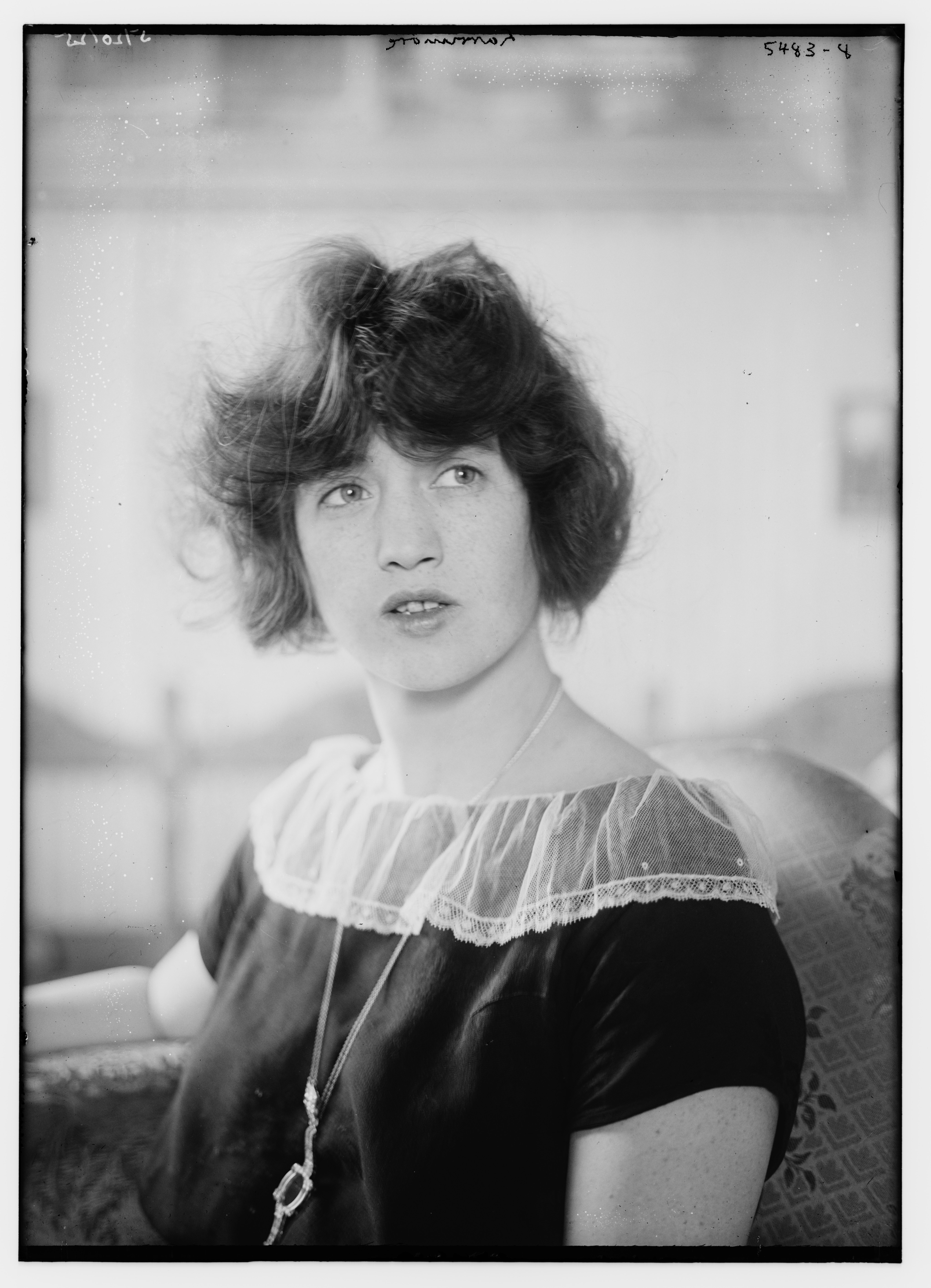
- Larrimore in the 1920s
- Born: Francine La Remee; August 22, 1898; Verdun, France
- Died: March 7, 1975 (aged 76); New York City, U.S.
- Occupation: Actress
- Years active: 1910–1939
- Spouse(s): Con Conrad; Alfred T. Mannon

Francine Larrimore (born Francine La Remee; August 22, 1898 – March 7, 1975) was a French-born American stage and screen actress.

== Biography ==
Born on August 22, 1898, in Verdun, Larrimore came to the United States when a child. She was educated in New York City. Her parents were J. Louis La Remee and Sarah Adler, a sister of the Yiddish stage star Jacob Adler and not to be confused with Jacob's third wife also named Sara. Jacob's children Stella and Luther are her cousins. Her sister Stella Larrimore (1905–1960) was married to the stage and screen star Robert Warwick.

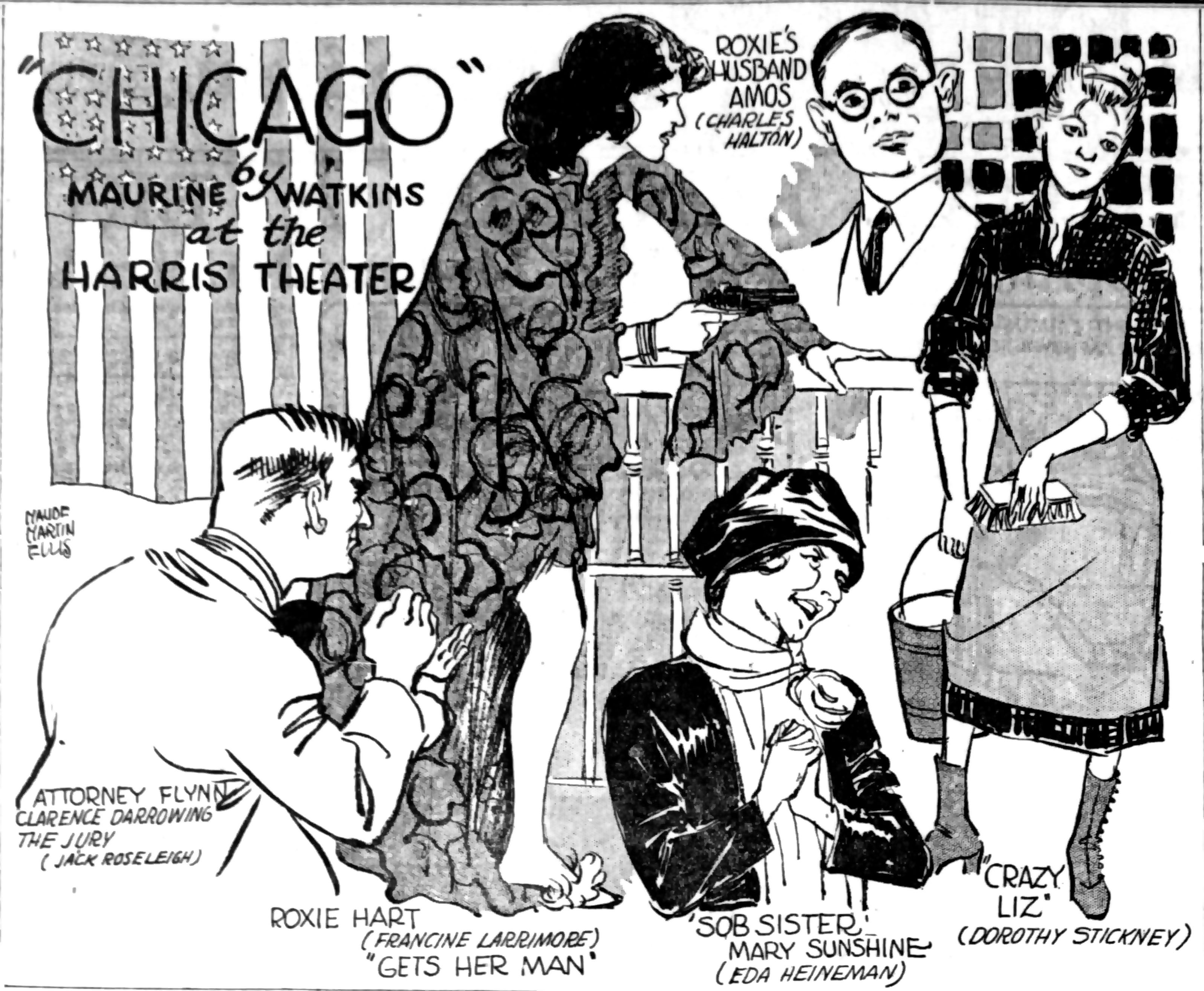
Larrimore and fellow cast members in Chicago Tribune image depicting the 1927 Chicago production of the play Chicago.

Larrimore began her stage career in 1910. In 1926, she created the role of Roxie Hart in the Broadway premiere of Chicago. She played Theodora Gloucester in the 1921 Broadway comedy Nice People. She also appeared in Let Us Be Gay and Brief Moment. She was part of the radio program Grand Central Station, in 1941. Her other Broadway credits include Spring Song (1934), Shooting Star (1933), This Was a Man (1926), His Queen (1925), Parasites (1924), Nancy Ann (1924), Nobody's Business (1923), Scandal (1919), Sometime (1918), Double Exposure (1918), Parlor, Bedroom and Bath (1917), Here Comes the Bride (1917), Moonlight Mary (1916), Some Baby! (1915), The Salamander (1914), The Switchboard (1913), and Where There's a Will (1910).

She appeared in a string of silent films in the 1910s, i.e. The Devil's Darling (1915, Mutual), The Princess From The Poorhouse aka The Royal Pauper (1917, Edison) and Max Wants a Divorce (1917, Essanay) co-starring Max Linder. Most are now considered lost films.

Her sound films number just two. She disappeared from acting in 1939.

== Filmography ==
- A Woman's Resurrection (1915) (*probably her debut billed as Frances Lorrimore)
- The Devil's Darling (1915) *short
- The Royal Pauper (1917)
- Max Wants a Divorce (1917) *short
- Max in a Taxi (1917) *short
- Somewhere in America (1917)
- John Meade's Woman (1937)
- The Devil's Daughter (1939)
