= When Ladies Meet (1941 film) =

1941 film by Robert Zigler Leonard

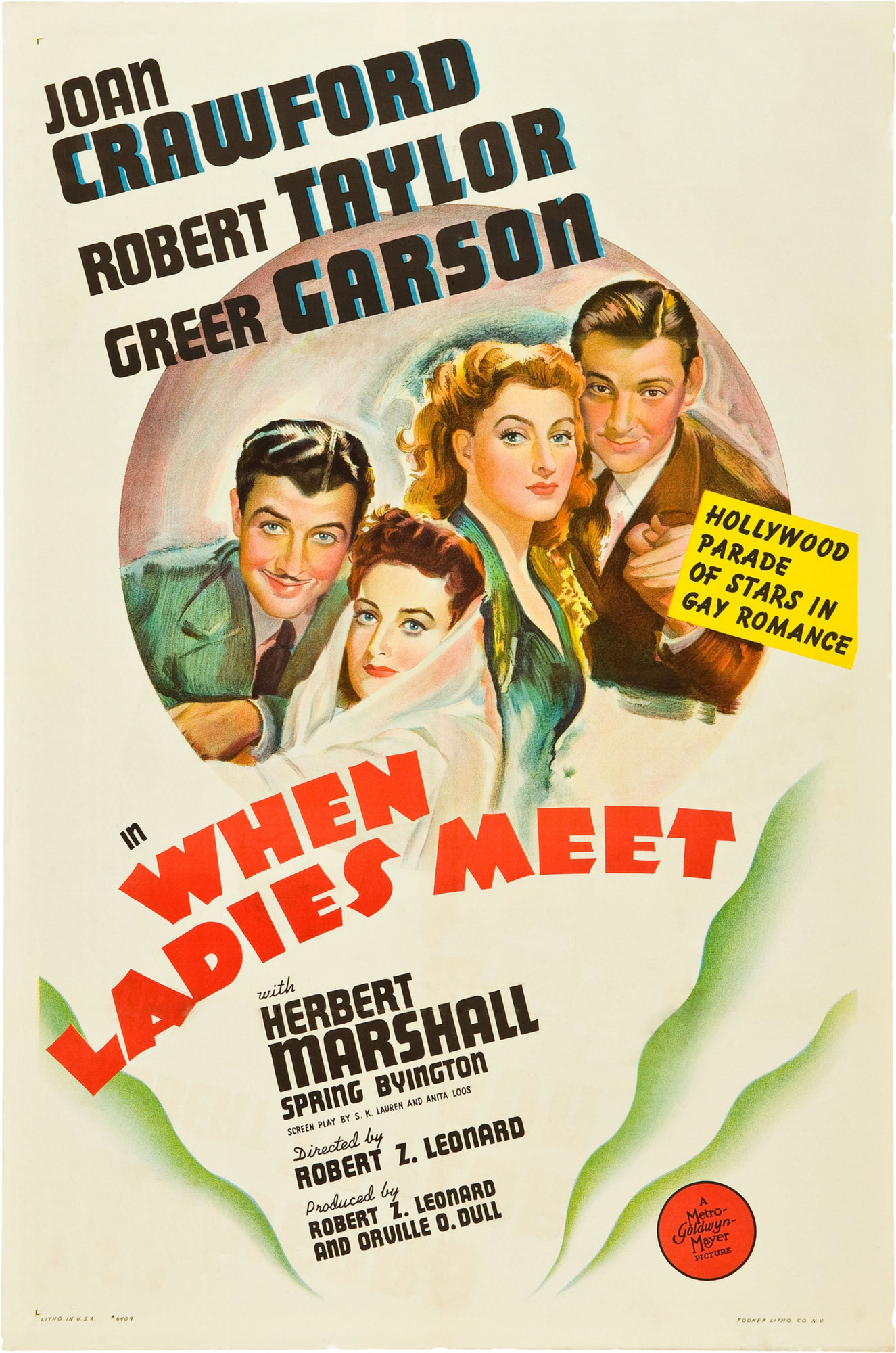
- Theatrical release poster
- Directed by: Robert Z. Leonard
- Written by: S.K. Lauren; Anita Loos; Leon Gordon; John Meehan (screenwriter)
- Based on: When Ladies Meet; 1932 play by Rachel Crothers
- Produced by: Robert Z. Leonard; Orville O. Dull
- Starring: Joan Crawford; Robert Taylor; Greer Garson; Herbert Marshall
- Cinematography: Robert H. Planck
- Edited by: Robert Kern
- Music by: Bronislau Kaper
- Production company: Metro-Goldwyn-Mayer
- Distributed by: Loew's Inc.
- Release date: August 29, 1941
- Running time: 105 minutes
- Country: United States
- Language: English
- Budget: $640,000
- Box office: $1,846,000

When Ladies Meet is a 1941 American romantic comedy film directed by Robert Z. Leonard and starring Joan Crawford, Robert Taylor, Greer Garson, Herbert Marshall and Spring Byington. The screenplay by S.K. Lauren and Anita Loos was based upon a 1932 play by Rachel Crothers. Made by Metro-Goldwyn-Mayer, director Leonard also coproduced along with Orville O. Dull. The film was a remake of the 1933 pre-Code film of the same name, which had starred Ann Harding, Myrna Loy, Robert Montgomery and Frank Morgan in the roles played by Garson, Crawford, Taylor and Marshall.

== Synopsis ==
Mary, a bestselling author, falls in love with her married publisher to the irritation of Jimmy who has long wanted her to marry him. Complications ensue when Mary encounters Clare, the wife of the man she believes she is in love with.

== Cast ==
- Joan Crawford as Mary 'Minnie' Howard
- Robert Taylor as Jimmy Lee
- Greer Garson as Mrs. Clare Woodruf
- Herbert Marshall as Rogers Woodruf
- Spring Byington as Bridget 'Bridgie' Drake
- Rafael Storm as Walter Del Canto
- Mona Barrie as Mabel Guiness
- Max Willenz as Pierre, Bridget's Summer House Handyman
- Florence Shirley as Janet Hopper
- Leslie Francis as Homer Hopper
- Olaf Hytten as Matthews
- Barbara Bedford as Anna
- Mary Forbes as Freddie's Mother
- Gayne Whitman as Woodruf's Office Manager
- Larry Steers as Mabel's Party Guest
- Jay Eaton as Mabel's Party Guest
- Jean Fenwick as Mabel's Party Guest

== Reception ==
Howard Barnes of the New York Herald Tribune wrote: "Even when [Crawford] is wearing spectacles, she is not particularly convincing in the part." According to MGM records, the film earned $1,162,000 in the U.S. and Canada and $684,000 in other markets, resulting in a profit of $607,000.

== Awards and nominations ==
The film earned an Academy Award nomination for art directors Cedric Gibbons, Randall Duell and Edwin B. Willis.

== Home media ==
When Ladies Meet was released on Region 1 DVD on March 23, 2009 as part of the online Warner Bros. Archive Collection.

== Bibliography ==
- Fetrow, Alan G. Feature Films, 1940-1949: a United States Filmography. McFarland, 1994.
