= When Ladies Meet (1933 film) =

1933 film by Robert Zigler Leonard, Harry Beaumont

- Lantern slide
- Directed by: Harry Beaumont; Robert Z. Leonard (uncredited retakes)
- Screenplay by: Leon Gordon; John Meehan
- Based on: When Ladies Meet; 1932 play by Rachel Crothers
- Produced by: Lawrence Weingarten (associate producer)
- Starring: Ann Harding; Robert Montgomery; Myrna Loy; Alice Brady; Frank Morgan
- Cinematography: Ray June
- Edited by: Hugh Wynn
- Music by: William Axt
- Production companies: Cosmopolitan Productions; Metro-Goldwyn-Mayer
- Distributed by: Loew's, Inc.
- Release date: June 23, 1933
- Running time: 85 minutes
- Country: United States
- Language: English

When Ladies Meet is a 1933 American pre-Code comedy film directed by Harry Beaumont and starring Ann Harding, Myrna Loy, Robert Montgomery, Alice Brady, and Frank Morgan. The film is the first adaptation of the 1932 Rachel Crothers play of the same name. It was nominated for an Academy Award for Best Art Direction by Cedric Gibbons.

The film was remade under the same name in 1941, starring Greer Garson, Joan Crawford, Robert Taylor, and Herbert Marshall in the lead roles played by Harding, Loy, Montgomery and Morgan.

== Plot ==
Mary (Myrna Loy), a writer working on a novel about a love triangle, is attracted to her publisher (Frank Morgan). Her suitor Jimmie (Robert Montgomery) is determined to break them up. He introduces Mary to the publisher's wife (Ann Harding) without telling Mary who she is.

== Background ==
Ann Harding had come to Hollywood in 1929, where she signed a well-paid contract with the film company Pathé Exchange, Inc. Within a few months, she had already become one of the top stars of talkies, eventually even being nominated for an Oscar for Best Actress for her performance in Holiday in 1930. However, when Pathé was taken over by the newly founded company RKO Pictures at the end of 1930, her career began to decline rapidly. Constant arguments about suitable screenplays, wrong decisions and increasing internal competition from new stars like Katharine Hepburn and Irene Dunne led to an ongoing crisis. None of their films had made a profit since 1931. In late 1932, Harding signed a three-film contract with MGM hoping to find better scripts and more professional working conditions there.

The adaptation of When Ladies Meet was the first project to be tackled. The film is based on the play of the same name by Rachel Crothers, which had 173 performances on Broadway during the 1932-33 winter season, with Spring Byington playing the role of Bridget Drake, played in the film by Alice Brady. MGM remade the story in 1941 as When Ladies Meet, this time starring Joan Crawford, Greer Garson, Robert Taylor, and Herbert Marshall. The cast initially saw Kay Francis play Claire and Harding as Mary before Francis was replaced by Loy and Harding settled on the role of the long-suffering wife.

== Cast ==
- Ann Harding as Claire Woodruff
- Robert Montgomery as Jimmie Lee
- Myrna Loy as Mary Howard
- Alice Brady as Bridget Drake
- Frank Morgan as Rogers Woodruff
- Martin Burton as Walter
- Luis Alberni as Pierre
- David Newell as Freddie (uncredited)
- Sterling Holloway as Jerome, the Caddy (uncredited)
