= Nice People (play) =

- Original language: English
- Written by: Rachel Crothers
- Genre: Comedy
- Setting: Gloucesters' apartment on Park Avenue, New York, Gloucesters' country cottage

Premiere
- Date: March 2, 1921
- Place: Klaw Theatre; New York City, New York

Nice People was a 1921 Broadway four-act comedy written and staged by Rachel Crothers, produced by Samuel H. Harris and starring Tallulah Bankhead and Francine Larrimore. After working with Bankhead in 39 East, Crothers wrote Nice People expressly for her. The general manager was William G. Norton, the scenic was designed by Navon Bergman, and John Kirkpatrick was the stage manager. It ran for 120 performances from March 2, 1921 to June, 1921, at the Klaw Theatre. It was included in Burns Mantle's The Best Plays of 1920-1921. It was also Katharine Cornell's Broadway debut.

It was adapted into the 1922 silent film Nice People, now believed to be lost.

== Cast ==
- Martin Alsop as Hubert Gloucester
- Francine Larrimore as Theodora Gloucester
- Tallulah Bankhead as Hallie Livingston
- Vincent Coleman as Billy Wade
- Katharine Cornell as Eileen Baxter-Jones
- Charles Gibney as Mr. Heyfer
- Edwin Hensley as Trevor Leeds
- Hugh Huntley as Scottie Wilbur
- Merle Maddern as Margaret Rainsford
- Guy Milham as Oliver Comstock
