= William Henry Meadowcroft =

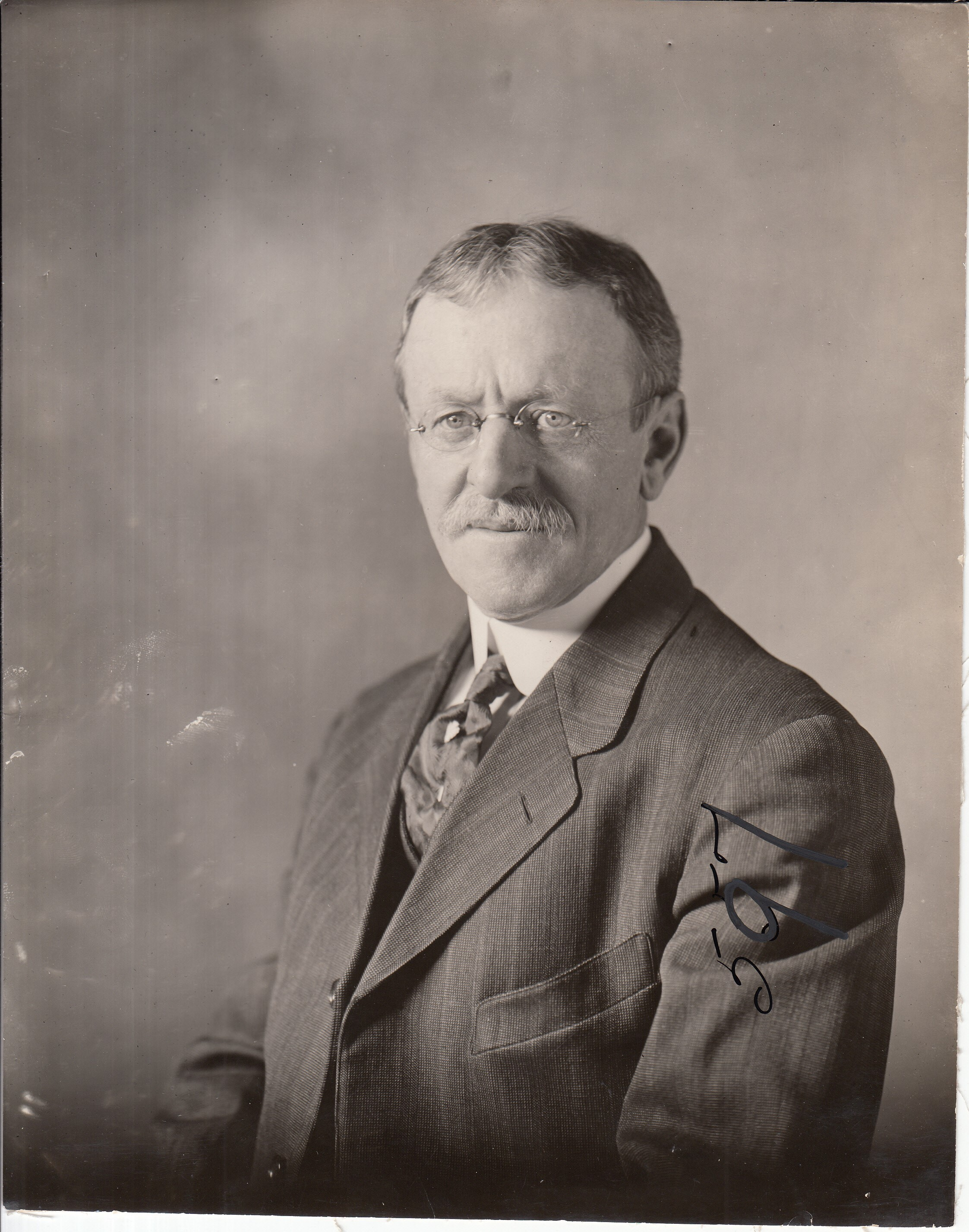
- Born: William Henry Meadowcroft; May 29, 1853; Manchester, UK
- Died: October 15, 1937 (aged 84); Boonton, New Jersey, U.S.
- Spouse(s): Phoebe Canfield, 1878-[1853?]
- Children: William Miron Meadowcroft, Charles Harry Meadowcroft
- Writing career
- Language: English
- Period: 1888–1921
- Genres: non-fiction, biography, science
- Notable works: The A B C of Electricity; The Boys' Life of Edison

William Henry Meadowcroft (29 May 1853 in Manchester – 15 October 1937 in Boonton, New Jersey) was the secretary of Thomas Edison and author of several books, including The A B C of Electricity (1888).

== Life and work ==
In 1875, he immigrated to the United States where he worked as a paralegal for the law firm Carter & Eaton. On 11 December 1878 he married Phoebe Canfield, with whom he had two sons. He was admitted to the New York State Bar Association in 1881. His collaboration with Edison began as one of the senior partners of the Carter & Eaton firm became Vice President of the newly formed Edison Electric Light Company. In 1910, Meadowcroft left the firm to succeed Frederick Miller Harry as Edison's personal secretary, a position he held until Edison's death.
