= Meet the Wife (play) =

- Written by: Lynn Starling
- Original language: English
- Genre: Comedy
- Setting: Gertrude Lennox's living room

Premiere
- Date premiered: November 26, 1923
- Place premiered: Klaw Theatre; New York City

Meet the Wife was a 1923 three act Broadway comedy written by Lynn Starling and produced by Stewart and French, Inc. It ran for 232 performances from November 26, 1923 to June 1924 at the Klaw Theatre. Mary Boland starred as inadvertent bigamist Gertrude Lennox, Humphrey Bogart as the juvenile lead reporter Gregory Brown and Clifton Webb as sporting youngblood Victor Staunton. It was set in Gertrude Lennox's living room.

It was adapted as a feature film also titled Meet the Wife in 1931 starring Laura La Plante.

== Cast ==
- Mary Boland as Gertrude Lennox
- Charles Dalton as Harvey Lennox
- Humphrey Bogart as Gregory Brown
- Clifton Webb as Victor Staunton
- Patricia Calvert as Alice
- Eleanor Griffith as Doris Bellamy
- Ernest Lawford as Philip Lord
- Charles Bloomer as William
- Ralph Glover
