= Rachel Crothers =

American dramatist (1878–1958)

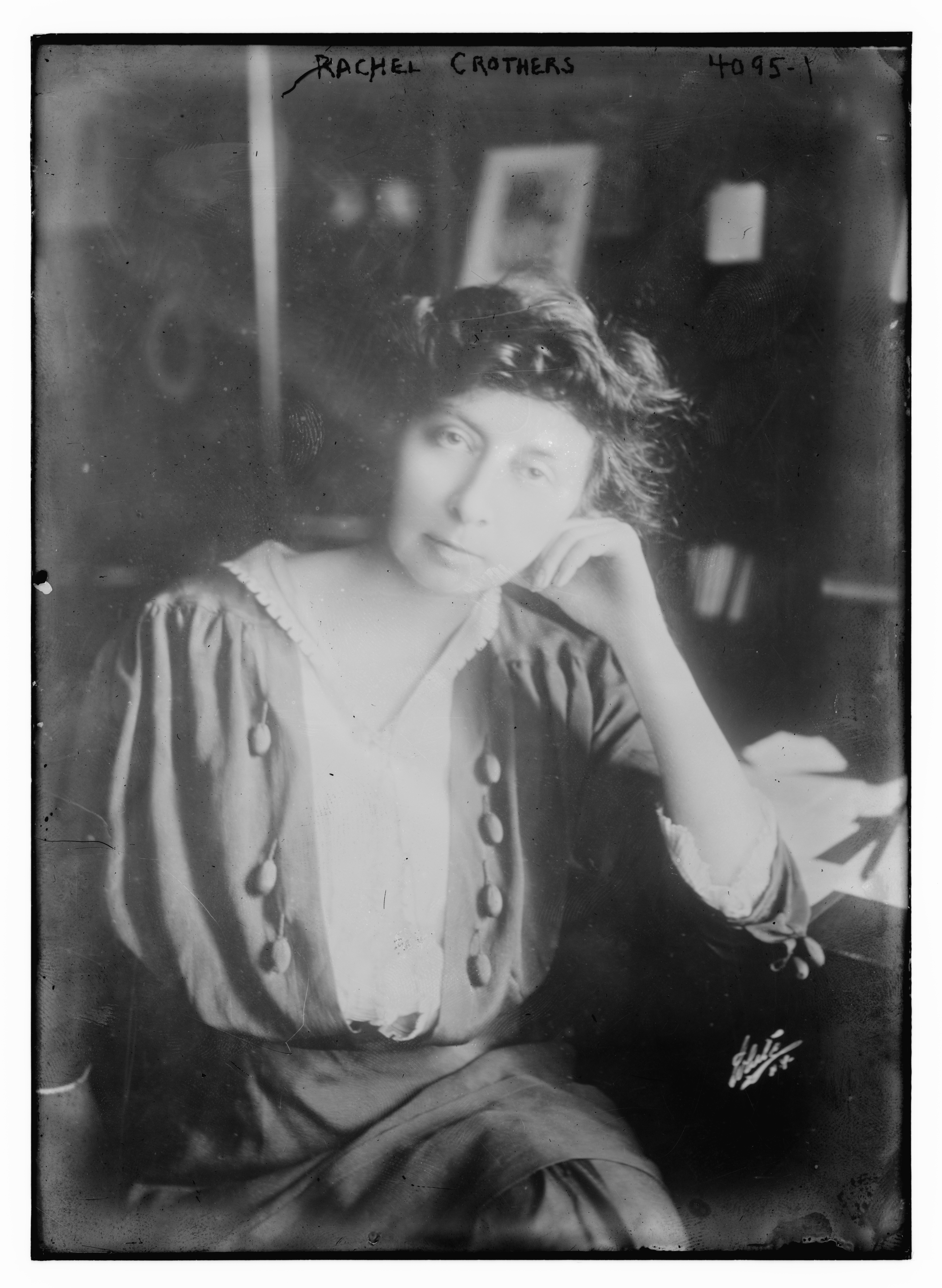
Rachel Crothers circa 1915

Rachel Crothers (December 12, 1870 – July 5, 1958) was an American playwright and theater director known for her well-crafted plays that often dealt with feminist themes. Among theater historians, she is generally recognized as "the most successful and prolific woman dramatist writing in the first part of the twentieth century." One of her most famous plays was Susan and God (1937), which was made into a film by MGM in 1940 starring Joan Crawford and Fredric March.

== Biography ==
Crothers was born on December 12, 1870, in Bloomington, Illinois, to Dr. Eli Kirk Crothers and Dr. Marie Louise (de Pew) Crothers. Crothers' mother, an independent-minded woman whose father had been friends with Abraham Lincoln, went to medical school at forty and became one of the first woman physicians in Illinois, encountering and eventually overcoming much opposition to her practice in Bloomington. Though her parents were religious and conservative, with no particular interest in theater, issues of money, equality, risk-taking, and a woman's place in the world were a part of Crothers' life from her earliest years.

The family intended that their daughters should be educated, and Crothers graduated from Illinois State Normal University in 1891. The following year, she attended the New England School of Dramatic Instruction in Boston, where her passion for the stage was nurtured. Her hopes of moving to New York to seek a career in theater were opposed by her parents, who insisted she return home to Illinois. Her interest in acting continued even there, however, and she was a founding member of the Bloomington Dramatic Club. (Her taste in plays was rather advanced for the time: Ibsen's still-scandalous A Doll's House was one of her suggestions for a Club production.) In 1898, five years after her father's death, Crothers was allowed to realize her dream and move on her own to New York. "I knew no one in New York," she later recalled, "but I had heard of David Belasco and Daniel Frohman, and they were kind enough to answer my letters." That was encouragement enough and, though the famous producers' help ended there, she left Bloomington for Manhattan, and, with the financial backing of her mother, enrolled in acting classes and found small parts in stock and touring companies.

By 1899, Crothers was writing her own one-act plays, and over the next few years, as these plays received showcase productions and good notices, she gained a reputation as a young dramatist of serious potential with an interest in the Ibsen-style "social problem drama." Her big break came in 1906, when her first full-length play, The Three of Us, was produced. It enjoyed a 277-performance run at the Madison Square Theatre in New York City. The play received its London premiere at Terry's Theatre on June 10, 1908, with Fannie Ward playing the leading role.

From that time on, through the 1940s, Crothers was a notable name in the Broadway theater world. Her commercial record was erratic—hits and flops, equally mixed—but she was a writer with a significant body of work to her name by the time she was middle-aged.

In 1917, during World War I, Crothers founded and led the Stage Women's Relief Fund. In 1932, she helped found the Stage Relief Fund, a response to the Great Depression, and remained a director until 1951. In 1940, she led in organizing the American Theatre Wing, which operated the famed Stage Door Canteen, and remained its executive director until 1950.

She died on July 5, 1958, in Danbury, Connecticut. She never married.

== Work ==
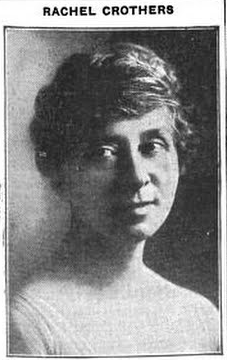
Rachel Crothers from a 1917 publication

Rachel Crothers' plays often dealt with contemporary social themes and moral problems affecting women, including the sexual double standard, trial marriage, "free love," divorce, prostitution, and Freudian psychology. Though some of her plays are clear, provocative expressions of sympathy for the challenges twentieth-century women had to confront and present young female characters of boldness and originality, others involve an element of comedy, even parody, and an implied criticism of radical feminism; thus, her work cannot be easily characterized in a political sense. In some plays, her free-spirited young women revert to traditional roles at the end, especially when they are in danger of losing a man they love, and in other plays "Crothers records a sense of disillusionment with the women's movement and a tendency to blame it for deficiencies in women's emotional life." But Crothers wrote in period of rapid social change, as she well knew. "If you want to see the sign of the times, watch women," she commented in 1912. "Their evolution is the most important thing in modern life."

When The Three of Us was written, the Nineteenth Amendment was fourteen years in the future and relatively few women questioned marital inequities; by the time she ceased writing plays in the late 1930s, the world, at least for middle-class women in the United States, had been altered in profound ways. Crothers' over thirty one-act and full-length plays reflect those changes, more subtly than she has sometimes been given credit for.

He and She (1920), for example, illustrates Crothers' nuanced sense of the gender problems modern Americans were confronting in this period of change. Set in 1910, at about the time she originally drafted the play, He and She takes as its protagonists an appealing married couple, Tom and Ann Herford. They are a cosmopolitan pair with careers, a child, and a happy marriage. Tom supports women's rights and is pleased that his wife has demonstrated talent in his own field, sculpture. But when he loses an important sculptural commission to Ann, the family's beliefs are put to the test: Can Tom live with his wife's public success and his own very visible failure? Can Ann live with Tom's embarrassment and the effect it may have on their relationship? Will Ann's professional commitments now take her even further from her maternal duties to a teenaged daughter who is already feeling neglected because of her parents' busy work lives? Other characters include Tom's assistant, who is honest about expecting his fiancée to give up her career as a journalist and become a homemaker when they marry (not an agreeable prospect to the young woman); Ann's father, who is dismayed that his daughter would even consider jeopardizing her marriage in this way; and Tom's unmarried sister, who is self-supporting but has achieved this status by not having a husband and children, a loss she regrets.

The play ends with Ann arguing that the decision to have children, for a woman, changes everything; motherhood must take precedence over a career. Yet He and She manages not to feel like a reactionary or anti-feminist tract. The inherent unfairness of the dilemma the Herfords confront has been well-established, leaving audiences food for thought. Ann's capacities and largeness of spirit have been ably displayed (she is one of the great female characters in American drama c. 1920). Most importantly, Crothers has situated her story in a real world of good intentions and hard facts: true equality is still a pretense, even among liberal men and women, and someone has to take care of the children. The values of the older generation for whom there is nothing to debate (represented by Ann's father) and the values of the New Woman (represented by the fiancée of Tom's assistant who has no intention of giving up her job when she marries) are also effectively noted. He and She was performed on Broadway in 1920 to critical approval (though not a strong box-office run) and was revived in New York, in a well-received production, in 1980 and again in 2005.

Crothers worked in a context that was both timely and, in some ways, strikingly against the grain. In the years immediately before World War I, for instance, Broadway saw a vogue for plays about white slavery, sexually transmitted disease, and brothels. Most of the writers were male, of course, and a borderline-legal but titillating Act I brothel or abduction scene was part of the pattern of these usually formulaic plays. Crothers' approach in Ourselves (1913) was different. She began work on the play in 1912 before the vogue was underway, visited the Bedford Street Reformatory for Women to talk to some imprisoned sex workers, and elected to adopt an entirely female-centered perspective. In what one theater historian has called "the best of all the white slave plays" of the era, Ourselves tells the story of a woman attempting to make a new life after being released from jail but confronted on all sides by people who want her to fall back into her old ways, don't believe that such a goal is possible for a "fallen woman," or profess a good-will that they cannot bring themselves to act on. Like George Bernard Shaw's Mrs. Warren's Profession, there is no brothel in the play to entertain a voyeuristic audience; there is a clear suggestion that male sexual appetites are the problem, not women's weakness or immorality; and the author expresses some skepticism about reformist intentions in a society wedded to its hypocrisy. Crothers goes further, though: one character (clearly echoing the writer's view) explicitly suggests that the men should be judged as harshly and readily by society as the offending women, while Crothers acknowledges that women's sexual urges are not entirely irrelevant to the predicament she is dramatizing. Reviews for the play were mixed, with many reviewers complaining that Crothers had written too few male parts (only four out of twenty-one characters are men) and focused too exclusively on "the feminine point of view."

Other plays by Crothers that deal with female identity and societal pressures to conform include her first, The Three of Us (1906), in which the female protagonist, a Nevada mine owner, protests the idea that a woman's "honor" is something men should feel obliged to protect; A Man's World (1910), the story of a woman writer who publishes under a man's name in the hope of greater acceptance; and Young Wisdom (1914), a satire of the New Woman and the idea of trial marriages. Nice People (1921) and Mary the Third (1923) include comic portrayals of flappers (Tallulah Bankhead played one of the flappers in Nice People), while As Husbands Go (1931) and When Ladies Meet (1933) explore Depression-era attitudes toward women's advancement since suffrage.

Crothers' last professionally produced play Susan and God (1937) was her greatest commercial success. The play tells the story of a wealthy, spoiled, and restless woman who finds meaning for her aimless life in an evangelical movement and attempts to convert her Park Avenue friends. She plans to leave her alcoholic husband and daughter to assume a public role as an evangelist, for which she is ludicrously ill-equipped. In the end, Susan accepts that she has been deluded by her conversion, that faith and salvation are far more complex than she had acknowledged, and that a more loving and meaningful act would be to help her husband achieve a stable life. Crothers biographer Lois Gottlieb finds the portrayal of the title character "satirical yet ultimately sympathetic."

Crothers was part of an "old girls' network" of theater professionals that took shape in the 1920s. Asked by Djuna Barnes in a 1931 interview about how she had been able to make a successful career in a male-dominated field, Crothers answered: "For a woman, it is best to look to women for help; women are more daring, they are glad to take the most extraordinary chances...I think I should have been longer about my destiny if I had to battle with men alone." Actresses were especially appreciative of the strong roles she created for them, and leading parts in her plays were performed by Ethel Barrymore, Estelle Winwood, Katharine Cornell, Tallulah Bankhead, and Gertrude Lawrence.

== Legacy ==
Crothers broke new ground by directing, staging, and casting most of her own plays. She also directed several plays written by others. Though little-known today, Crothers was regarded as the most successful woman to write for the stage in the decades before the rise of Lillian Hellman in the 1930s.

Rachel Crothers opened doors for women in the theater before World War II. She was also known as a philanthropist and activist. She established a number of organizations to improve the welfare of her theatrical colleagues: the United Theatre Relief Committee, the Stage Relief Fund (director from 1932 to 1951), the Stage Women's War Relief Fund, and the American Theatre Wing for War Relief, which operated the famed Stage Door Canteen, and remained its executive director until 1950. On April 25, 1939, Crothers was awarded the Chi Omega sorority national achievement award by Eleanor Roosevelt, a gold medal award given “to an American woman of notable accomplishments in the professions, public affairs, art, letters, business and finance, or education."

According to her biography on Literature OnLine, Rachel Crothers "distinguished herself as one of the most significant American playwrights of the early twentieth century and as an influential force in the development of modern drama." A "genuine trailblazer" was Ethan Mordden's description of her in his history of Broadway, All That Glitters. Crothers, who never married, died in her Danbury, Connecticut, home in 1958 at age 79.

== Major plays ==
- Nora (1903)
- The Point of View (1904)
- Criss Cross (1904)
- Rector (1905)
- The Three of Us (1906)
- The Coming of Mrs. Patrick (1907)
- Myself Bettina (1908)
- Kiddies (1909)
- A Man's World (1910)
- He and She (1911)
- The Herfords (1912)
- Ourselves (1913)
- Young Wisdom (1914)
- The Heart of Paddy Whack (1914)
- Old Lady 31 (1916)
- Mother Carey's Chickens (1917)
- Once Upon a Time (1918)
- A Little Journey (1918)
- 39 East (1919)
- Nice People (1921)
- Everybody (1921)
- Mary the Third (1923)
- Expressing Willie (1924)
- A Lady's Virtue (1925)
- Venus (1927)
- Let Us Be Gay (1929)
- As Husbands Go (1931)
- When Ladies Meet (1932)
- Caught Wet (1932)
- Susan and God (1937)

== Adaptations ==
- The Three of Us – 1914 silent film starring Mabel Taliaferro, Creighton Hale, and Master Stuart.
- A Man's World – 1918 silent film starring Emily Stevens, John Merkyl, and Frederick Truesdell.
- Old Lady 31 – 1920 silent film starring Emma Dunn and Henry Harmon. Remade in 1941 as The Captain Is a Lady, starring Charles Coburn, Beulah Bondi, and Virginia Grey.
- 39 East – 1920 silent film starring Constance Binney, Reginald Denny, and Alison Skipworth.
- Nice People – 1922 silent film starring Wallace Reid, Bebe Daniels, and Conrad Nagel.
- Wine of Youth – 1924 silent film, based on Crothers' play Mary the Third: a Comedy in Prologue and Three Acts, starring Eleanor Boardman, James Morrison, Johnnie Walker and Pauline Garon, directed by King Vidor.
- A Little Journey – 1927 silent film starring Claire Windsor, William Haines, and Harry Carey.
- Let Us Be Gay – 1930 film starring Norma Shearer. The play was also filmed in a French language version in 1931, titled Soyons gais, directed by Arthur Robison, and stars Lili Damita.
- As Husbands Go – 1933 film starring Warner Baxter, Helen Vinson, and Warner Oland.
- When Ladies Meet – 1933 film starring Ann Harding, Myrna Loy, Robert Montgomery, Alice Brady, and Frank Morgan. Remade in 1941, under the same title, starring Joan Crawford, Robert Taylor, and Greer Garson.
- Mother Carey's Chickens – 1938 film starring Anne Shirley and Ruby Keeler.
- Susan and God – 1940 film starring Joan Crawford and Fredric March, directed by George Cukor.

== Filmography ==
- The Perils of Divorce – Story for the 1916 silent film starring Edna Wallace Hopper, Frank Sheridan, and Macey Harlam.
- Splendor – Story and screenplay for the 1935 film starring Miriam Hopkins and Joel McCrea.
- No More Ladies – Adaptation for the 1935 film starring Joan Crawford and Robert Montgomery.

== Sources ==
- Atkinson, Brooks. Broadway. New York: Atheneum, 1970.
- Gottlieb, Lois, "Looking to Women: Rachel Crothers and the Feminist Heroine" (pp. 128–135) in Helen Krich Chonoy and Linda Walsh Jenskins (eds.), Women in American Theatre. New York: Theatre Communications Group, 2006.
- Gottlieb, Lois. Rachel Crothers. New York: Twayne, 1979.
- Koritz, Amy. "Consumption and Commitment: Rachel Crothers and the Flapper's Dilemma" (pp. 39–63) in Culture Makers: Urban Performance and Literature in the 1920s. Champaign, Illinois: University of Illinois Press, 2008.
- Mordden, Ethan. All That Glittered: The Golden Age of Drama on Broadway, 1919–1959. New York: St. Martin's Press, 2007.
- Murphy, Brenda (ed.). The Cambridge Companion to American Women Playwrights. Cambridge: Cambridge University Press, 1999.
- Radavich, David. "Living Fifty-Fifty: Gender Dynamics in the Plays of Rachel Crotherrs." MidAmerica XXXVIII (2011): 82–92.
