= Kahoona =

the Kahoona
- Sandra Dee and Cliff Robertson in Gidget
- First appearance: Gidget, The Little Girl With Big Ideas
- Last appearance: The New Gidget
- Created by: Frederick Kohner
- Portrayed by: Cliff Robertson; Martin Milner; Don Stroud

In-universe information
- Gender: Male
- Occupation: Beach bum, Ski bum
- Spouse: Buff (divorced)

The Kahoona (sometimes the Great Kahoona) is a character created by Frederick Kohner in his 1957 novel, Gidget, the Little Girl with Big Ideas. As "Kahuna", the character appears in the 1959 film Gidget and in some of the television work involving the Gidget character.

== In the novels ==
Gidget describes the Kahoona's first appearance:

Just then the bamboo curtain to the hut was drawn open and this bum came out. What I mean, he wasn't a bum, but then he wasn't exactly the kind of guy that would drive a girl mad with desire either. He was on the oldish side—around the end of the twenties or so. You got the impression he had just got up or something. Of course all the surfers in enclosure wore only shorts or Hawaiian-print bathing trunks but this superannuated Huckleberry Finn had on a pair of jeans that were cut off just beneath the knees and looked more like an old rag bleached by the sun. He was a real tall guy with legs of unbelievable length. Jeez, he was tanned. You've never laid your eyes on a tan like that. Like one of those suntan oil ads you see in magazines—only more so. He had a beard growth of at least three days and he stood there and scratched his stubble and had this kind of empty gaze like he was full of booze.

There was something about the way the other guys greeted him that told me he was a real hotshot.

Gidget and the Kahoona introduce themselves thus:

”Come along, kid,” he said. “What's your name?”

”It's Franzie,” I said. “From Franziska. It's a German name. After my grandmother.”

”Mine is Cass,” he said, real friendly, “from Cassius. After nobody.”

The Kahoona is a principal character in this novel and its immediate sequel, Cher Papa, alternately Gidget's friend, role model and potential love interest. He does not address or refer to Gidget by her titular nickname, but calls her Franzie or Angel. In the second novel, it is revealed that his last name is Jason, and that he served in the Korean War. In this novel Gidget becomes deeply infatuated with him. He does not appear in the subsequent novels, but is occasionally mentioned in passing, for example in the novelization Gidget Goes Hawaiian:

"My friend the great Kahoona once told me that the sea is where we came in, and the sea is where we go out. We have crawled out of the sea and one day we're going to crawl back into it. That solution of salt is in our blood."

== In film ==
In the 1959 film Gidget, Cliff Robertson portrays the character (now spelled Kahuna); in this film his proper name is Burt Vail. Kahuna does not appear in Gidget Goes Hawaiian or Gidget Goes to Rome.

== In television ==
In the television sitcom Gidget, (episode three, The Great Kahuna), he is portrayed by Martin Milner, and the character's proper name is Cassius Kopp. Kahuna does not appear in Gidget Grows Up or Gidget Gets Married, but he is portrayed by Don Stroud in Gidget's Summer Reunion and The New Gidget.
