= Gidget (disambiguation) =

Gidget is a fictional character created by Frederick Kohner in his 1957 novel Gidget, the Little Girl with Big Ideas.

Gidget may also refer to:

== Music ==
- Gidget (EP), a 1993 EP by Good Riddance
- "Gidget" (song), a 1959 song by James Darren

== Films and TV ==
- Gidget (film), a 1959 film adaptation starring Sandra Dee
- Gidget (TV series), a 1960s sitcom adaptation starring Sally Field
- The New Gidget, a 1980s sitcom adaptation starring Caryn Richman

== People ==
- Gidget, a female professional wrestler from All-Star Wrestling
- Kathy Kohner-Zuckerman (born 1941; nicknamed "Gidget") Kohner's daughter and the inspiration for the fictional character

== Fictional characters ==
- Gidget the Super Robot, a character from the Nick Jr. Channel cartoon Wow! Wow! Wubbzy!
- Gidget, a white Pomeranian character in the animated feature The Secret Life of Pets.

== Other ==
- Gidget (1994–2009), a dog who portrayed the Taco Bell chihuahua in 1990s TV commercials
- Gidget, a simplified interface to linux inotify, written in C.
