= Gidget's Summer Reunion =

- Dean Butler and Caryn Richman
- Genre: Adventure; Comedy; Drama
- Written by: Robert Blees; George Zateslo
- Directed by: Bruce Bilson
- Starring: Caryn Richman; Dean Butler; Allison Barron; William Schallert; Anne Lockhart; Mary Frann
- Theme music composer: George Tipton
- Country of origin: United States
- Original language: English

Production
- Executive producers: Harry Ackerman; Carole Coates
- Producer: Ralph Riskin
- Cinematography: Richard M. Rawlings Jr.
- Editor: Art Stafford
- Running time: 98 minutes
- Production companies: Ackerman-Riskin Productions; Columbia Pictures Television

Original release
- Network: Syndication
- Release: June 1, 1985

Related
- Gidget Gets Married; The New Gidget

Gidget's Summer Reunion is a 1985 American made-for-television adventure comedy-drama film produced by Columbia Pictures Television that aired in syndication on June 1, 1985. It was written by Robert Blees and George Zateslo, directed by Bruce Bilson and stars Caryn Richman as Gidget, Dean Butler, Allison Barron, William Schallert, Anne Lockhart and Mary Frann.

== Plot ==
Now in their late twenties and married, Gidget and Jeff live in Santa Monica. Jeff is an architect and Gidget is a travel agent. They have no children of their own but are minding Gidget's 15-year-old niece Kim while Kim's parents are in Europe.

Their marriage is troubled, in part because they are becoming workaholics and leaving themselves too little quality time.

Gidget plans a surprise 30th birthday party for Jeff that will reunite their old surfing friends, but she must take the place of a coworker and coordinate a trip in Hawaii. Jeff resists romantic advances from Anne Bedford, his beautiful and libidinous boss.

Kim acts much as did Gidget at the same age. She wants to learn how to surf but sneaks out of the house to see Mickey, a suave, self-serving beach bum, behind the back of Albert, her nerdy boyfriend.

Gidget returns from Hawaii just in time to save her marriage and rescue Kim from her troubles.

== Cast ==
- Caryn Richman as Francine "Gidget" Griffin
- Dean Butler as Jeff "Moondoggie" Griffin
- Allison Barron as Kim
- William Schallert as Russ Lawrence
- Anne Lockhart as Larue Powell
- Mary Frann as Anne Bedford
- Don Stroud as The Great Kahoona
- Vincent Van Patten as Mickey
- Johnny Yune as Johnny Soon
- David Knell as Albert Winslow
- Ben Murphy as Ron Levering
- Will Nye as Slim
- Steven Kavner as Malibu Mac
- Michael Pniewski as Scooter Boy (as Michael Pniewski)
- Peter Ackerman as Darryl
- Brad Zutaut as Kirk
- Buck Young as Bob
- Gillian Dobb as Mary Jane
- George Zateslo as Hot Dog
- Bill Edwards as Harry Schaffer
- Danny Kamekona as George the Chauffeur
- Moe Keale as Bob the Driver

== See also ==
- Gidget (film)
- Gidget Goes Hawaiian
- Gidget Goes to Rome
- Gidget (TV series)
- Gidget Grows Up
- List of television films produced for American Broadcasting Company
