= Gidget Grows Up =

1969 television film by James Sheldon

- Karen Valentine and Paul Lynde
- Genre: Comedy
- Based on: Gidget Goes New York by Frederick Kohner
- Written by: John McGreevey
- Directed by: James Sheldon
- Starring: Karen Valentine; Edward Mulhare; Paul Petersen
- Theme music composer: Shorty Rogers; lyrics by Kelly Gordon; sung by Jean King
- Composer: Shorty Rogers
- Country of origin: United States
- Original language: English

Production
- Executive producer: Harry Ackerman
- Producer: Jerome Courtland
- Cinematography: John M. Stephens
- Editor: Aaron Nibley
- Running time: 74 minutes
- Production company: Screen Gems

Original release
- Network: ABC
- Release: December 30, 1969

Related
- Gidget; Gidget Gets Married

Gidget Grows Up is a 1969 American made-for-television comedy film directed by James Sheldon with stars Karen Valentine, Edward Mulhare and Paul Petersen as well as alphabetically listed special guest stars Warner Anderson, Bob Cummings, Nina Foch and Paul Lynde. Freely adapted from the novel Gidget Goes New York by Frederick Kohner, the film premiered on ABC on December 30, 1969, and was intended as a pilot for a possible new Gidget series, possibly a sequel to the 1960s sitcom Gidget.

== Plot ==
After two years of college abroad, Gidget returns to Santa Monica. She discovers that the letters she wrote to her boyfriend Jeff, intended to make him jealous, have backfired, and her attempts to patch things up with him are rebuffed. Inspired by a speech she hears on television made by the United States Ambassador to the United Nations, she hops a bus to New York City to work for the United Nations.

She meets the ambassador, who finds her a job, but because she has only two years of college education, the best position the United Nations will offer her is tour guide. She meets and has a fling with Alex Mac Laughlin, an Australian agronomist who finds her and two of her fellow employees an inexpensive Greenwich Village apartment, managed by the eccentric Louis B. Latimer, a grown child actor has-been attempting a comeback as an independent film director.

Gidget has a number of comical and romantic adventures before being reunited with former boyfriend Jeff.

== Cast ==
- Karen Valentine as Gidget
- Edward Mulhare as Alex Mac Laughlin
- Paul Petersen as Moondoggie

Guest stars in alphabetical order

- Warner Anderson as Ambassador Post
- Bob Cummings as Russ Lawrence
- Nina Foch as Bibi Crosby
- Paul Lynde as Louis B. Latimer

Cast members listed only in end credits

- Susan Batson as Diana
- Hal Frederick as Lee
- Helen Funai as Minnie
- Mario Aniov as Abdul
- Gunilla Knudsen as Katrina
- Doreen Lang as Mrs. Willard
- Michael Lembeck as Arnold
- Davis Roberts as Bukumbu representative
- Cynthia Lynn as dispatcher
- Donald Symington as clerk
- Harlan Carraher as Ben
- Margot Jane as Rae Ellen
- Leo G. Morrell as Turkish delegate
- Lloyd Kino as Japanese delegate
- Hugo Bianqui as Italian delegate

== See also ==
- Gidget (film)
- Gidget Goes Hawaiian
- Gidget Goes to Rome
- Gidget Gets Married
- Gidget's Summer Reunion
- The New Gidget
- List of television films produced for American Broadcasting Company
- United Nations in popular culture
