= Larue Wilson =

Larue
- Lynette Winter as Larue in Gidget
- First appearance: Gidget, The Little Girl With Big Ideas
- Last appearance: The New Gidget
- Created by: Frederick Kohner
- Portrayed by: Lynette Winter; Anne Lockhart; Jill Jacobson

In-universe information
- Gender: Female
- Occupation: Student. Later, travel agent

Larue Wilson is a fictional character introduced in the Frederick Kohner novel Gidget, the Little Girl with Big Ideas (1957). She also appears in much of the television work involving Gidget.

== The Novel ==
Larue is first mentioned as described by Gidget in the novel Gidget, the Little Girl with Big Ideas:

"I called Larue who is my girlfriend across the street. Larue is one year older than I and in the possession of a genuine driver's licence as well as a jazzed up Ford vintage 1930. No kidding. She had inherited it from her mother who had driven it for sixteen years. It's a convertible with a new motor in it and beats a Cadillac any day. Some guy had offered her five hundred bucks for it but she had just looked down her nose at him—and she's got quite a long nose. Everything on Larue is long: her nose, her feet, her arms, her teeth, her fingernails, and when she had the mumps, it was the longest mumps on record. I often feel sorry for her. Her love life is defunct—unless you believe my brother in law who figures Larue is sublimating with horses. She works at this crummy stable all the time and rides the horses of people who board them there. It doesn't cost her a nickel."

Larue is a fairly minor character in this novel, and she does not appear in any of the subsequent Gidget novels by Kohner, nor in any of the three Gidget motion pictures produced by Columbia Pictures. She reemerges as a principal character in the 1965-1966 sitcom version of Gidget.

== Television ==
Anne Lockhart as Larue Powell in Gidget's Summer Reunion.

Jill Jacobson as Larue Wilson in The New Gidget.

In the television sitcom Gidget, Larue is played by Lynette Winter. Her last name is not given in the novel, and only once in episode #11 she is referred to by Anne as "Larue Shelby". As the best friend of Frances "Gidget" Lawrence (Sally Field), she gets caught up in Gidget's schemes and misadventures. Larue frequently is presented as a foil to Gidget. She often joins her on her trips to the beach, but is fair-skinned, never wearing anything too revealing and sporting a large hat to protect against the sunlight. Some of Gidget's friends see Larue as uncool (e.g. Dolly in episode #11 "My Ever Faithful Friend"), but she generally is depicted as average. She and Gidget are usually inseparable.

In the ABC telemovies Gidget Grows Up (1969) and Gidget Gets Married (1972), Larue does not appear, but she does appear as "Larue Powell" in the ABC telemovie Gidget's Summer Reunion (1985), played by Anne Lockhart.

In The New Gidget (1986), Larue, renamed "Larue Wilson", is played by Jill Jacobson.

Other facts about Larue based on information given in the show:

- She regularly does eye exercises.
- She is fluent in at least some Spanish, which is a necessity as her home has a housekeeper who only speaks the language.
- She is into equestrianism, as seen in "My Ever Faithful Friend," which is partially centered around her regular trips to the stable and interest in buying "Snowball," an older white horse.
- Larue is older than Gidget by a few months, and had her drivers license while Gidget did not. This necessitated her getting involved in some of Gidget's schemes in which driving was required. For example, in one episode, Gidget is hired as a delivery girl for a florist, but the owner of the shop is unaware that she can't drive. So Larue shows up at shop during Gidget's shift in order to drive the delivery van.
- She has an older first cousin who dated Gidget in the episode "Image Scrimmage."
