= Moondoggie =

- First appearance: Gidget, The Little Girl With Big Ideas
- Last appearance: The New Gidget
- Portrayed by: James Darren; Stephen Mines; Paul Petersen; Michael Burns; Dean Butler

In-universe information
- Nickname: Moondoggie
- Gender: Male
- Occupation: Student. Later Military, then engineer (in Gidget Gets Married) and architect (in Gidget's Summer Reunion and The New Gidget).
- Spouse: Gidget (at the end of the last novel, and in some of the later television work)

Moondoggie is a fictional character created by Frederick Kohner in his 1957 novel Gidget, The Little Girl with Big Ideas. He appears as a principal character in five of the eight Gidget novels, but is a minor character or is only mentioned in passing in Cher Papa, The Affairs of Gidget and Gidget Goes Parisienne.

== History ==
He is portrayed as a surfer who saves Gidget from drowning and later becomes romantically involved with her. In the novels, two of the television movies and The New Gidget, his real name is Geoffrey H. Griffin (the middle initial is mentioned only in the first novel), but in the three Gidget motion pictures and the 1960s sitcom Gidget his name is changed to Jeffrey Matthews, and in Gidget Gets Married his name is Jeff Stevens. In the novelization Gidget Goes Hawaiian we learn that his nickname refers to his fondness for surfing by moonlight.

In the three motion pictures Gidget, Gidget Goes Hawaiian and Gidget Goes to Rome, Moondoggie is portrayed by James Darren, the only character to be played by the same actor in all three films. In the sitcom Gidget, he is portrayed by Stephen Mines; in Gidget Grows Up by Paul Petersen, in Gidget Gets Married by Michael Burns, and in Gidget's Summer Reunion and The New Gidget by Dean Butler.

At the end of the last Gidget novel, Gidget Goes New York, Moondoggie and Gidget are married. They are also portrayed as married in Gidget Gets Married, Gidget's Summer Reunion and The New Gidget.
