= Gidget (TV series) =

American sitcom (1965–1966)

- Original title screen
- Genre: Sitcom
- Created by: Frederick Kohner (novel)
- Starring: Sally Field; Don Porter
- Theme music composer: Jack Keller
- Opening theme: "(Wait 'Til You See) My Gidget", performed by Johnny Tillotson
- Composers: Dave Grusin; Stu Phillips; Charles Albertine
- Country of origin: United States
- Original language: English
- No. of seasons: 1
- No. of episodes: 32

Production
- Executive producer: Harry Ackerman
- Producers: Bob Claver (pilot episode); William Sackheim
- Running time: 25 minutes (per episode)
- Production company: Screen Gems

Original release
- Network: ABC
- Release: September 15, 1965 – April 21, 1966

Related
- Gidget Grows Up (1969); The New Gidget

Gidget is an American sitcom television series by Screen Gems about a surfing Southern California teenager named "Gidget" and her widowed father Russ Lawrence, a UCLA professor. Sally Field stars as Gidget with Don Porter as father Russell Lawrence. The series was first broadcast on ABC from September 15, 1965, to April 21, 1966. Reruns were aired until September 1, 1966.

Gidget was among the first regularly scheduled color programs on ABC. With a Wednesday-night time slot that put it in direct competition with The Beverly Hillbillies and The Virginian, it did poorly in the Nielsen ratings and was cancelled at the end of its first season.

== Background ==
The television series was based upon concepts and characters created by Frederick Kohner in his 1957 novel Gidget, the Little Girl with Big Ideas, which Kohner based upon the adventures of his teenaged daughter Kathy. The novel was adapted into a 1959 movie, Gidget, starring Sandra Dee, James Darren, and Cliff Robertson. The 1965 weekly half-hour television series is seen by some as a sequel to the 1959 film, despite numerous discontinuities in plot, time-frame, and other details. It can also be seen as an independent incarnation, related to, but distinct from either the novels or the films. Kohner served as a script consultant on the show.

The series reintroduced Gidget's friend Larue and married sister Anne Cooper, both of whom appear in Kohner's original novel, but are absent from the motion-picture series. Gidget's brother-in-law, who appears in the novels as the intelligent but condescending child psychiatrist Larry Cooper, is reinvented in the television series as John Cooper, an obtuse but lovable psychology student.

== Plot ==
Gidget centers on the father-daughter relationship between Frances "Gidget" Lawrence and her widowed father Russell Lawrence. Episodes follow Gidget's adventures in school, at home, and at nearby beaches. Russell Lawrence guides his 15-year-old daughter, while married sister Anne and husband John offer often unsolicited child-rearing tips. Gidget's friend Larue sometimes takes part in her escapades. More often than not, Gidget receives moral instruction from her father and gains wisdom from her experiences.

Each episode is narrated by Gidget; on occasion, she breaks the "fourth wall" and directly addresses her audience, usually reflecting on what she has learned from the evening's story, and sometimes ending with "Toodles!" (an expression Field improvised during production). The pilot explained that her boyfriend called her Gidget because of her demure, petite build and short stature: "Girl midget, Gidget!"

== Characters ==
=== Main characters ===
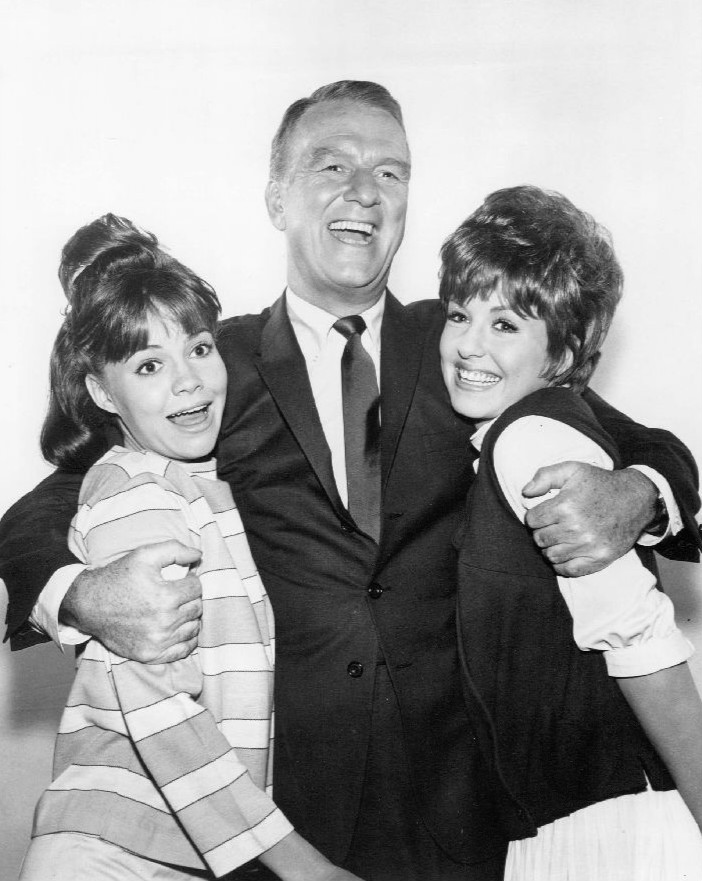
Don Porter with Sally Field and Betty Conner, 1965

- Frances Elizabeth "Gidget" Lawrence (portrayed by Sally Field) is the prototypical southern California beach bunny free spirited and frequently barefoot at home and at the beach.
- Russell Lawrence (portrayed by Don Porter) is Gidget's widowed father and an English professor at UCLA.

=== Recurring characters ===
- Anne Cooper (portrayed by Betty Conner) is Gidget's older, married sister.
- John Cooper (portrayed by Pete Duel) is Anne's husband, a psychology student.
- Larue Wilson (portrayed by Lynette Winter) is Gidget's best friend.
- Jeff "Moondoggie" Matthews (portrayed by Stephen Mines) is Gidget's boyfriend, who is away at Princeton University.
- Siddo (portrayed by Michael Nader) is Gidget's schoolmate.
- Randy (portrayed by Rickie Sorensen) is Gidget's schoolmate.

=== Gidget's brief love interests ===
While Jeff was Gidget's true love (she regularly wore his high-school ring around her neck), she regularly dated — or more accurately, pursued — other boys while he was away at college.

- Kahuna (portrayed by Martin Milner) - "The Great Kahuna"
- Jack Collins (portrayed by James Davidson) - "A Hearse, a Hearse, My Kingdom for a Hearse"
- Roger Haimes (portrayed by James M. Crawford) - "Image Scrimmage"
- Mark (portrayed by Robert Random) - "Chivalry Isn't Dead", "Gidget's Foreign Policy"
- Bret (portrayed by Randy Kirby) - "The War Between Men, Women and Gidget"
- Tom Brighton (portrayed by Daniel J. Travanti) - "Now There's a Face"
- Corky Cook (portrayed by Peter Brooks), Tate Cook (Larry Merrill) - "Too Many Cooks"
- Baxter Stevenson (portrayed by Tom Gilleran) - "I Love You, I Love You, I Love You, I Think"
- Durf the Drag (portrayed by Richard Dreyfuss) - "Ego-a-Go-Go"
- Scott (Carl Reindel), Richie Ryan (David Macklin) - "Love and the Single Gidget"
- Toby (Robert Beach) - "I Have This Friend Who..."

== Production ==
The show launched the career of 18-year-old Sally Field, who defeated 75 other teenage girls for the title role. Field exaggerated her surfing experience to the show's casting directors during her audition (she had none); she later took lessons from Phil Sauers just to be able to pretend to surf for the cameras. Sauers served as the series' "surfing technical consultant" and provided the surfboards used during filming of the series.

Don Porter had portrayed Gidget's father, Russell Lawrence, two years prior in the film Gidget Goes to Rome and was asked to reprise the role for the series.

While the Gidget of the novel and the original film are both blondes, the Gidget of the television series is a brunette.

The lyrics of the theme song "(Wait 'Til You See) My Gidget" were written by Howard Greenfield, with music by Jack Keller. The song was performed in the pilot by The Four Freshmen, and in the series by Johnny Tillotson.

In the credits for the pilot episode, John Cooper is listed as "Larry".

The show ranked 68th out of 108 shows airing that season with a 26.8% audience share.

== Episodes ==
No.	Title	Directed by	Written by	Original release date
1	"Dear Diary-et al"	William Asher	Ruth Brooks Flippen	September 15, 1965
15 1/2-year-old Gidget, whose real name is Frances, falls in love with surfing and with a surfer named Jeff (Moondoggie). Gidget's family consists of her father, Professor Russell Lawrence (Don Porter), and older sister Anne. Anne has been over protective of Gidget ever since their mother passed away. Anne is married to John Cooper (Pete Duel), who is studying to become a psychologist. Anne is worried because Gidget is late coming home. Gidget calls her friend Larue and tells her that Jeff will be going back to college soon. Gidget is going steady with Jeff but wonders what she should do while he is gone. Gidget tells Jeff that she will date other boys while he is gone. Anne reads Gidget's fanciful diary and assumes that all of her sister's outlandish entries ("...and I sank into nothingness") are true. Gidget gets upset when Jeff tells her he will date other women. Gidget tells him she does not want to see him anymore. Gidget regrets what she said and schemes to get Jeff back. She goes to the beach with Larue where she sees Jeff with another girl. Meanwhile, John and Anne tell Russell about their concerns and the diary. Gidget gets upset when she thinks her father read her diary. Russell tells her he did not read her diary, but will not say how he got the information. She figures out that Anne was the one. Gidget tells her father she just made things up in her diary.
2	"In God, and Nobody Else, We Trust"	William Asher	Ruth Brooks Flippen	September 22, 1965
Gidget tells the boy she is with at the Shake Shack how great it is she can date others, but still be going steady with Jeff. A week later and no boy has called Gidget. She tells her father that she does not have a date to the upcoming luau. He tells her that maybe she should not mention to the boys that they cannot get interested in her because of Jeff. The two come up with the idea that Gidget should ask Anne's husband John to be her date. Gidget finds a way to have Anne make John go. John then gets the idea to use the experience for the topic of his term paper. Gidget works with John so he will fit in. Anne starts to have second thoughts when she sees how attractive some of Gidget's girlfriends are. It is the night of the luau and Gidget tells Anne she will introduce John as Panther. At the luau, everyone wants to know where Gidget found Panther. John asks different girls personal questions for his research and they are a bit offended. The guys are not happy about it either. Anne shows up dressed as a teenager to check up on John. Russell is hiding in the bushes to keep an eye on Anne, but he is caught by the other guys. Things get confusing and Gidget has to explain who Russell, Anne and John really are. Afterwards, Russell is worried what Gidget's friends think of him, Anne and John. Beverly Adams as Treasure. Heather North as Pokey. Michael Nader as Siddo. Rickie Sorensen as Randy. Joy Harmon as Midge. Ronne Troup as Luau Party guest. Sue Hamilton as Luau Party Guest
3	"The Great Kahuna"	William Asher	Story by : Frederick Kohner; Teleplay by : Albert Mannheimer	September 29, 1965
Gidget and everyone else on the beach is impressed with a traveling surfer called Kahuna (Martin Milner). An old girlfriend named Buff (Julie Parrish) shows up on the beach that Kahuna does not want to see. He enlists Gidget to pretend to be his girlfriend and drive Buff away. Kahuna tells Gidget that he owes her and Gidget reads more into it than he means. Gidget envisions herself traveling around the world to the greatest surfing sites with Kahuna. Russell, John and Anne notice how distracted Gidget is. One day Russell goes to the beach and Gidget introduces him to Kahuna. Gidget is surprised when Kahuna shows Russell his cabin on the beach. Gidget tells her father that she loves Kahuna and wants to travel with him despite a slight age difference. Russell says he understands and would like to get to know Kahuna a little better. He suggests that Gidget invite him to dinner. Kahuna arrives to the house for dinner and Gidget almost did not recognize him as he is wearing a suit. Gidget learns that Kahuna's real name is Cassius Cobb. Gidget gets disappointed when Cassius talks about settling down and getting a job and a home. Gidget starts to suspect that Cassius is putting up a front to scare her off. She talks about how it is a good idea to settle down and she will do it with him. It is Cassius who gets frightened off. Gidget also figured out that her father was in on it.
4	"Daddy Come Home"	William Asher	Ruth Brooks Flippen	October 6, 1965
Everytime Russell wants to do something with his daughter Gidget, she has to go to the beach. Gidget convinces Russell to relax a little and go to the beach with her. While there, Russell sees a woman that he is very attracted to. Russell gets into a conversation with the woman, a Sally Combs (Marian Collier). On the way home Gidget learns that Russell asked Sally out to dinner. Gidget says that he knows nothing about the woman. Russell leaves for his date and tells Gidget he will be home early. When Gidget cannot find any friends to hang out with, she winds up going to Anne and John's house. Anne and Gidget start talking about Sally. John thinks Gidget is being very maternal and overly concerned of Russell. Gidget leaves in a huff. Gidget tries to sleep but then decides to stay up until Russell comes home. It is way after midnight and Gidget starts to worry that he may have had an accident. Gidget calls the police and speaks with Sergeant Kulpepper (Joseph V. Perry). Kulpepper misunderstands and thinks Gidget is a mother looking for her son. Officer Joe Hanley (Harvey Korman) finds Russell and Sally parked in his car. Hanley tells Russell that his mother is looking for him. Hanley follows Russell home and gives him a ticket for speeding. Russell is embarrassed and very upset with Gidget. Russell realizes how worried Gidget was and he says he should've called.
5	"Gidget Gadget"	E. W. Swackhamer	Stephen Kandel	October 13, 1965
Gidget wins a free dance lesson from a Radio Contest. She was hoping for something better. Anne comes by and tells Gidget and her father that she has left John. Anne was feeling very neglected. Gidget tells Anne she is welcome to stay with them. Russell tells Gidget she will have to share her room with Anne. Having Anne around is starting to cramp Gidget's style. Gidget comes up with a plan to get John and Anne back together. she will try to have them take the dance lesson. Russell can tell that Gidget is up to something and tells her not to get involved. Gidget calls John and tells him not to come over, but he says he will be there. Mark Hillman (Dick Gautier), the dance instructor, arrives and Gidget tries to get him to leave. Mark starts dancing with Anne and John shows up. Things get very awkward and Mark leaves. John thinks Gidget set him up and leaves. Anne tells Gidget that she cannot forgive her for what happened. Gidget then has Sylvia (Janis Hansen), from the Dance studio, come to give John a lesson. John then races over to Gidget's house. John and Anne make up because of their mutual anger at Gidget.
6	"A Hearse, a Hearse, My Kingdom for a Hearse"	William Asher	Story by : Louella MacFarlane; Teleplay by : John McGreevey	October 20, 1965
Gidget is upset with Jack Collins because she had to wait for over an hour to get a ride to the beach. Gidget tells Jack that she is going to get her own car. Jack reminds her that she does not have a license yet. Gidget then sees King Mannix's old hearse. Despite it having 99,000 miles on it, it is painted really wild. King will be leaving for Las Vegas in July. By then Gidget will be sixteen. King agrees to sell the car to her for $310 and she gives him a $6 down payment. Gidget should have the rest of the money by July. Back at home, Russell does not think Gidget buying the car is a good idea and wonders where she will get the money. Gidget tells Russell she will take auto shop in school so she can repair the car herself. Mr. Walters (Herb Ellis), the auto shop teacher, is surprised when Gidget enrolls in his class. Three weeks later, Gidget learns that King sold the hearse and left for Acapulco. She finds out from Jack that he and some other friends bought the hearse. Jack says that now she can quit auto shop, but she will not do it. Jack and Russell come up with a plan to let Gidget see how hard auto shop really is. It is not long before Gidget has had enough and she sells her share of the car to Jack. Joy Harmon as Blonde Girl Dancing.
7	"Gidget is a Proper Noun"	Oscar Rudolph	Austin Kalish & Irma Kalish	October 27, 1965
Gidget is convinced that her English teacher, Donald Hardy (Noam Pitlik), expects more of her than his other students because she is the daughter of his former English professor, Russell. Gidget tells Russell how she feels about Hardy. She cannot go out to eat with Russell, John and Anne because she has too much English homework. Gidget is even doing homework at the beach. Gidget is having trouble with the latest composition assignment. She comes up with a plan to prove Hardy is prejudiced against her. Gidget will turn in one of her father's old papers, that got an A, as her own. When Hardy gives her a lesser grade, that will prove what she believes. A problem arises when Hardy quotes a passage from Russell's paper to the class, that he remembered. He will know Gidget copied her paper. Gidget now has to try and switch the paper she turned in with one she originally wrote. Gidget is not able to make the switch, but does leave her original. She tells Russell what she did and why. At the next class, Hardy asks Gidget to read her paper to the students. She thinks he wants her to read her father's paper that she turned in as hers. Gidget is surprised to find that the paper is her original one. Hardy gave the paper an A. After class, Hardy and Gidget have a conversation about why she turned in Russell's paper and they come to an understanding. Sue Hamilton as Classmate. Ronne Troup as Classmate.
8	"Image Scrimmage"	William Asher	Barbara Avedon	November 3, 1965
Gidget is on a blind date with Larue's cousin Roger Haimes from New York. Gidget finds him very attractive. But when buying tickets for a movie, Roger makes a comment about Gidget being younger. Meanwhile, Russell's student, Mary Haliday, has a crush on him. Gidget tells Russell that Roger is used to sophisticated women. Russell bought Gidget a dress, but she thinks it is something that a child would wear. Gidget does not have to heart to tell Russell what she thinks of the dress. Mary comes by and she is wearing glasses to look older. Gidget gets the idea to try to look and act more mature. Gidget learns that Anne actually picked out the dress, so now she does not feel bad about exchanging it. Gidget gets a more sophisticated dress. Larue calls and tells Gidget that she cannot get Roger to come over. He is busy planning a party with the guys. Larue learns that it is a "kidnap" party. Gidget tries to find out if she is on the list to be "kidnapped". Things get awkward when Anne sees Gidget in the new dress. Gidget and Larue don't wind up getting "kidnapped". The next morning Roger and a bunch of friends come by to take Gidget and Larue on a picnic.
9	"Is It Love or Symbiosis?"	E. W. Swackhamer	Story by : A. J. Mady & Frederick Kohner; Teleplay by : A.J. Mady	November 10, 1965
Gidget complains that Anne does not think she acts very ladylike. One day, Russell is driven home by Jerry Rodgers (Roy Stuart) and Terry Walker (Donna Anderson). Terry is in the art department and gives Russell a kiss. Anne and John are there and they see this. They think Russell needs to see more women. They suggest Russell send Gidget to a private girls' school in Paris. It would be under a full scholarship. Anne says Gidget could learn the social graces there. Russell does not think it is necessary and Gidget is against it. John tells Russell that he has become too dependent on Gidget and that is why he does not want to send her. As long as Gidget does everything for Russell, he will never remarry. Something happens later that makes Russell think Anne and John are right. Gidget tells her friends that Russell changed his mind about sending her away. Jerry tells Russell that he will move in and the two will have a great time. Jerry has interior decorator Pat Taylor (Judy Carne) come by Russell's house. Gidget comes home and overhears Jerry telling Russell that his social life will greatly improve. Gidget now believes that Russell wants his freedom. she will pretend that she wants to go. As the day gets closer, both Russell and Gidget start to have second thoughts. They admit to each other that they like things the way they are.
10	"All the Best Diseases Are Taken"	E. W. Swackhamer	Tony Wilson	November 17, 1965
Gidget is inspired by protest singer Billy Roy Soames (Henry Jaglom). She would like to find a cause to get behind. Larue tells her that the local movie theater is raising its prices for Friday & Saturday nights. That is when the kids usually go. As chairman of her local civics club, Gidget would like a better cause. After talking to Russell, Gidget decides to protest the ticket prices. Gidget and a couple friends go to speak with Mr. Lefferts (Dick Wilson) at the theater. Mr. Lefferts is unsympathetic. Gidget holds a small rally in front of the theater, but people still go in. Billy Roy Soames is in town and Gidget hopes to recruit him for her cause. Billy is not interested. Later, Billy comes by Gidget's house and says he will help for one night, if she lets him stay at her house. Russell is not thrilled about Billy being there. Gidget and Billy start their campaign, but the kids are more interested in Billy than the cause. Mr. Evans (Noah Keen), from the university, tells Russell he is worried that things could get out of hand and spread to the campus. Russell tries to talk Gidget out of the protests. Gidget asks Russell if he stood up to Mr. Evans, which he did not. Russell tells Gidget that he is behind her. Billy overheard the conversation. Not wanting Russell to get in trouble, Billy makes up an excuse to Gidget that he has to leave.
11	"My Ever Faithful Friend"	Gene Reynolds	Ruth Brooks Flippen	November 24, 1965
Gidget and Larue are on the beach. Dolly comes by and starts putting down Larue. Gidget sticks up for Larue and Dolly leaves. Gidget does get a little upset when all Larue can talk about is a Snowball, a horse she likes. Larue does not think she can compete with the other kids. Gidget tries to teach Larue some social graces. Larue tells Russell that Gidget is spending a lot of time and money on her and it is probably a waste. Larue does not care what others think as long as the people she cares about like her. Russell pays Larue several compliments and she feels better. She also mentions Snowball, the old horse she loves riding and wishes her parents would buy for her. Russell tells Larue she can talk horses to him any time. Larue tells Russell how happy she is to know him. Gidget gives Larue a makeover and Russell says she looks great. Gidget starts to think that her father and Larue are becoming an item. Larue calls Russell to talk about Snowball. Russell does not tell Gidget what the call was about. The next morning Larue comes by to talk to Russell about the horse again. Gidget overhears part of the conversation, misunderstands and is even more sure something is going on. Russell goes with Larue to see the horse. John confronts Larue and misunderstands things as well. Gidget learns from Larue there is nothing going on between her and Russell. Misunderstandings continue and Larue thinks Russell really has fallen for her. Things finally get straightened out and Larue's father buys her the horse. Russ Bender as Tacky.
12	"Chivalry Isn't Dead"	E. W. Swackhamer	Story by : Martin A. Ragaway; Teleplay by : John McGreevey	December 1, 1965
Gidget is waiting for her boyfriend Mark (Bob Random) to pick her up. He will honk his car horn when he gets there. Russell wonders why Mark cannot come to the door and what happen to chivalry. Mark arrives and honks his horn, but Gidget does not go outside. Mark finally comes to the door. Gidget even gets Mark to pick up her things. At school, Gidget tells her girlfriends that they need to make the boys more considerate of them. The girls want to come up with a way for the boys to ask them for dates in advance, not at the last minute. The boys always wait to see how the surf will be before asking the girls out. Gidget asks Russell if she can have the girls over for a slumber party. That way when the boys ask the girls out at the last minute, the girls will actually have plans. The girls learn that the surf will be bad. At the slumber party, the girls are not having a lot of fun. They wonder what the boys are doing. Meanwhile, the boys are all together with nothing to do. One of the boys calls Larue's house and learns the girls are all at Gidget's house having a wild party. Mark calls the house and Gidget says the girls are having a great time. Mark wants to bring the boys over. Gidget says that if he had mentioned something earlier in the week, but the girls have plans now. The girls wish that Gidget had let the boys come over. The boys find a way to get all the girl's to meet up with them at Pete's house. But the girls then feel bad for leaving Gidget alone at her party. In the end, Mark and Gidget come to an understanding about courtesy. Beverly Washburn as Marcia. Bonnie Franklin as Janie. Barbara Hershey as Ellen.
13	"The War Between Men, Women and Gidget"	E. W. Swackhamer	Story by : Pauline and Leo Townsend; Teleplay by : Stephen Kandel	December 8, 1965
Gidget's boyfriend Bret found a secluded beach cove that is perfect for surfing. However, it is not long before other people show up. Bret tries to tell them that this is his group's spot. Bret and another boy named Larry get into a confrontation. A man from the Beach Patrol comes by and puts up a temporary no surfing sign. Gidget's group and Larry's group get into a fight at a shake shop. Gidget and the girls want to figure out a way for the boys to share the beach when the surfing is allowed. The girls decide to not go out with the boys until they come to a truce. Russell tells Gidget that this plan could backfire. The girl's plan seems to be working. They overhear the boys planning to meet at the cove to negotiate. When the girls get to the beach, they see the boys with different girls. Bret is with Patty Cromwell (Linda Gaye Scott). The girls now have to come up with a way to get the boys back. Gidget tricks Patty into thinking that Bret has a vitamin deficiency. Patty must be constantly watching Bret to make sure he does not overexert himself. After a while, Bret has had enough of Patty mothering him. Gidget thinks that she has Bret back now. Bret finds out about Gidget's scheme. Bret comes up with his own scheme and tells Gidget that he has a terminal disease. Now that Bret has gotten even with Gidget, they make up. Charla Doherty as Darcy. Mako as Casey.
14	"Gidget's Foreign Policy"	Jerrold Bernstein	Stephen Kandel	December 15, 1965
Russell introduces Gidget to Gunnar Malstrom (Walter Koenig) and Inge (Brooke Bundy). Inge is a Swedish college student who will stay with the Lawrence's until the dorms open in a week. Gunnar mentions that he and Inge are not yet engaged, but they are planning for the future. Inge is very meek and shy. She wants to help by doing a lot of the house work. Gidget wants Inge to go surfing, but Inge thinks she should be studying. Gidget talks Inge into going to the beach. There Gidget tries to show shy Inge how to get boys to do things for her. Inge is a quick learner. It is not long before boys are calling Inge to get together. Even Gidget's boyfriend Mark calls up Inge. Gidget is not happy when Mark spends a lot of time with Inge. Gidget voices her frustration to Russell and he says he will talk to Inge. Inge sweet talks Russell and he is not able to really talk to her. Russell is worried because Gunnar is supposed to come back the next day. He left a quiet shy girl and he will come back to a party girl. Gidget comes up with a plan. Gidget sets up a dinner for her, Inge, Mark and Gunnar. Gunnar does not like the new wild Inge. Gunnar finds a way for Inge to balance fun and being serious.
15	"Now There's a Face"	E. W. Swackhamer	Dorothy Cooper	December 22, 1965
Gidget is on the beach with her eyes closed and her tongue sticking out. A guy comes by and takes a picture of her. He introduces himself as Tom Brighton (Daniel J. Travanti) and he is a photography student. They meet up on the beach for the next several days and Tom takes more pictures of Gidget. John and Anne tell Russell that they are concerned with the time Gidget is spending with Tom as he is older. Gidget tells Russell that she is in love with Tom. She says to not worry as it is completely one sided. One day, Tom is setting up a picture of Gidget that he says will be on the cover of a teen magazine. Gidget goes to Tom's place to tell him she cannot pose for him anymore. He is developing those last pictures he took of her and tells her how perfect they are. Tom then kisses Gidget. He gets a phone call and tells the person that he is in love with a face. Gidget knows he is talking about her and leaves all excited. What Gidget does not know is that Tom was talking to Penelope Peterson (Sabrina Scharf), his fiancée. Gidget tells Russell what she heard. Gidget gets a call from Tom, who says he has a surprise for her. She thinks he is going to propose. John learns Tom is engaged and tells Russell. Gidget pretends to not be devastated when she meets Penelope. Something happens later that makes Gidget realize that Tom did care for her a little. Lillian Adams as Mrs. Daley.
16	"Too Many Cooks"	Oscar Rudolph	Albert Mannheimer	December 29, 1965
It is Saturday night and Gidget comes home early from a date with Tate Cook. She makes the excuse that she has to help her Father. After a couple minutes Corky Cook comes to the door to pick up Gidget for a date at a party at Jean's (Bonnie Franklin) house. At a party, Gidget explains to Larue how she accidentally made dates with Corky and Tate for the same night. Corky and Tate are cousins and they hate each other. Tate is captain of the football team and Corky is the captain of the basketball team. Tate shows up to the party and Gidget goes and hides. Gidget makes another mix-up and winds up asking both Tate and Corky to the Founder's Day dance. Gidget wishes Jeff (Moondoggie) were back from college so she would not have to date other boys. Russell gives Gidget a telegram from Jeff. He will be coming in for his grandparents anniversary and he wants to take her to the Founder's Day dance. Gidget figures she will just have to try to juggle the three dates. Something Larue says gives Gidget an idea. she will join the welcoming committee, so she will have to be busy greeting people. The three boys show up and Gidget does have some juggling to do. Gidget does get found out by the boys. Gidget goes home and tells Russell that she is worried Jeff will never talk to her again. Jeff comes by and tells Gidget that he understands and is not mad at her.
17	"I Love You, I Love You, I Love You, I Think"	William Asher	Ruth Brooks Flippen	January 5, 1966
Gidget calls Larue and tells her that she is in love. Russell overhears and reminds Gidget what happened last September. Flashback to: Jeff had gone back to Princeton. Gidget goes to the beach to be alone. Gidget sees a slightly older surfer bum and winds up spending time with him. She sees him again the next day, but he will not tell her his name. They spend more days together and Gidget thinks he is falling for her. The guy senses that Gidget really likes him and he tries to tell her it would not work. He asks her to forget him. It is the first day of school. Gidget's first class is math. Larue sees the handsome teacher and points him out to Gidget. It turns out to be the surfer she fell for over the summer. He introduces himself as Baxter Stevenson and then sees Gidget. She goes running out of the room. Gidget runs into Baxter again later and goes running out of the school, only to fall into a pond. The next day, Gidget pretends to be sick so she does not have to go to school. She tries to tell Russell she does not need a high school education. Gidget goes to school but hides in the Janitor's room. Everyone is looking for her. Things eventually get worked out and Gidget and Baxter come to an understanding.
18	"Like Voodoo"	E. W. Swackhamer	Albert Mannheimer	January 13, 1966
At the beach, Gidget tells Casey, a Motorcycle Cop, that her brand new custom built surfboard was stolen out of Larue's car. Gidget and Larue go looking around the beach. They see Gidget's board with a for sale sign on it by the camper of gypsy fortune teller Zangara. Zangara comes out and tries to stop the girls from taking the board. Gidget shows Zangara that her name is on it. When Gidget says she will get a policeman, Zangara puts a curse on her until she brings it back. Gidget starts to become accident-prone. Russell asks Gidget what is bothering her. She tells him about the gypsy and the curse. Russell tells her that is all superstition. Gidget does some research in Russell's book of voodoo and tries to remove the curse. Russell tells her again that it is all in her head. Gidget goes to consult with John and a series of accidents happen there. Russell tells Gidget that he spoke with a friend of his who is an expert in these matters. Russell now believes the curse is real and gives Gidget a talisman to protect her. Gidget goes surfing and everything is fine. Larue tells Gidget that Zangara was arrested for stealing other surfboards. Russell tells Gidget that the talisman was actually a tie clip. Gidget realizes that Russell out foxed her and there is no curse. Peggy Rea as Fat Lady.
19	"Gidget's Career"	E. W. Swackhamer	Joanna Lee	January 20, 1966
Two boys from Larue's guitar class ask her to meet them at the beach with her guitar. Gidget goes with Larue so she does not back down. Larue introduces Gidget to Paul (Jimmy Hawkins) and Doug. The boys are immediately taken with Gidget and ask her to play tambourine while they play. They play a little and the kids really like it. Peter Stone (Michael Nader) asks them to play a song at the noon dance the next day. The group plays several more times and Gidget winds up getting more attention than Larue. Gidget is watching the "Swinging Teens" show on TV. The host, Rick Farmer (Sandy Kenyon), says they are always looking for new talent. Gidget writes in to Rick. Rick tells the group he will give them an on-the-air audition in ten days. Rick mentions looking professional. Gidget wants to call the group "Gidget and the Gories" and they will all dress in black. They now use amplifiers for their guitars and have taken on Ringo Feinberg (Dennis Joel) as their drummer. Paul tells Gidget that Larue is not keeping up and he wants to get rid of her. Larue can tell the band does not want her and she tells Gidget that she is quiting. Gidget starts to worry about what life will be like if the band actually takes off. Russell goes to see Rick. Rick says the band has a chance to go far with their clean wholesome look. Rick does not know about the bands new look. Gidget goes to see Larue and they are still friends. Gidget tells the group either take Larue back or she will quit. The group gets someone to fill Gidget and Larue's place and Gidget is fine with that.
20	"Ego a-Go-Go"	Jerrold Bernstein	Barbara Avedon	January 27, 1966
Larue learns that Gidget is taking Norman Durfner (Richard Dreyfuss) to the Spinster Hop. He is known as Durf the Drag, the class nerd. Gidget tells Larue that she made a bet with John that she can build up Norman's ego and boost his confidence. Back at the house, Gidget and Larue find college football quarterback Chuck Batson there waiting to see Russell. Chuck needs help with his grammar. Gidget now wants to go to the Spinster Hop with Chuck. She figures if Chuck thinks that she can influence Russell's grade for Chuck, he will want to spend time with her. Larue does not think Gidget will be able to break the date with Durf. That night, Durf comes over and Gidget starts out by flattering him. Durf gets swell headed and breaks the date with Gidget. Durf, who now calls himself Durf the Surf, has completely changed his appearance and manner. He wants to run for class president against Deke, who is very popular. Shari Sue, a class snob, is Deke's girlfriend. Shari Sue asks Gidget if she would like to double date to the Hop. Gidget and Durf and Shari Sue and Deke. Gidget cannot let Shari Sue find out that Durf broke the date. Gidget finds a way to bring Durf's ego down to something manageable and he asks her to the Hop.
21	"In and Out with the In-Laws"	Bruce Bilson	Ruth Brooks Flippen	February 3, 1966
Gidget gets a letter from Jeff. He writes that his parents will be passing through her town and he would like her meet them. She is afraid that Jeff may be thinking marriage. The day she is to meet them, Gidget wants Russell's advice on what to wear. She wants to make a good impression. Della Mae (Janis Hansen), one of Russell's students, drives up. Russell gets Della Mae to drive Gidget to the lunch date with Jeff's parents. Meanwhile, Jeff's parents, Jim (Hal March) and Laura Mathews (Hazel Court) are at their hotel. Laura is worried that she will appear too old to Gidget. Gidget and Della Mae arrive at the hotel. There is a convention of shoe salesmen going on at the hotel. Della Mae agrees to go in with Gidget when she sees several handsome men. Gidget runs into Laura and, not knowing who she is, strikes up a conversation with her. Gidget mentions meeting Jeff's parents and possibly marrying him. Laura leaves and Della Mae shows up. Della Mae suggests that Gidget switch sweaters with her because Gidget spilled a soda on hers. Laura tells Jim that she met Gidget. Laura wants Jim to go and talk to Gidget the anonymous way she did. Jim just has to find a girl with a soda stain on her sweater. Jim sees the stain on Della Mae's sweater and starts talking to her thinking she is Gidget. Things get confusing when Della Mae accuses him of trying to pick her up. Everything finally gets worked out, but Russell and Jim wind up with black eyes.
22	"We Got Each Other"	Bruce Bilson	John McGreevey	February 10, 1966
Gidget is on a date with Toby Prentiss. All Gidget can talk about is things her dad said and Toby is getting annoyed. Toby thinks that Gidget and Russell's relationship is a little too close. Russell has been dating a woman named Barbara Leeds (Kathleen Crowley). Gidget has a hard time remembering Barbara's name and giving Russell phone messages from her. Gidget wants to cook a fancy meal for Russell and Barbara. During the dinner, Gidget is very accident prone and things get very awkward. Gidget now tries to avoid Russell at all costs. Russell asks Gidget to go away with him for the weekend. At first she is very excited, but then she says she has a date. Anne asks Gidget why she is avoiding Russell. Gidget says she wants him to have his own life and not to be so dependant on each other. Russell brings up the fact that Gidget is avoiding him to Anne and John. They just tell him that things will work out. Gidget calls Barbara and asks her to bring a surprise meal to Russell that evening. Russell invited Meg over for dinner. Barbara shows up. Pete then shows up with a bunch of people all bringing food. Anne and John had called Pete. Later that night, Gidget tries to explain to Russell how she felt. They decide there is nothing wrong with spending time together.
23	"Operation Shaggy Dog"	Hal Cooper	Dorothy Cooper	February 17, 1966
Gidget really likes the local hamburger joint, The Shaggy Dog. She even likes the grumpy owner, Socrates (Lew Parker). Gidget and her friends learn that the town is trying to raise funds to buy out Socrates and close the restaurant. Socrates claims he would not mind selling the place if they raise enough money. Gidget learns that Russell was appointed the chairman of the committee to buy out the place. Russell says they want to tear down the restaurant and put up an art museum. Gidget mounts a public-relations campaign to save The Shaggy Dog for Socrates. While some of the reasons for change that Russell comes up with makes sense, Gidget is determined. Both parties continue to try and raise money. One day Russell comes home to find Gidget having a rummage sale in the house. He tells Gidget he is holding a committee meeting in the house in a few minutes. Gidget suggests the den. Larue brings by her cousin Buzz, who is an illusionist. He winds up taking some items from Russell's guests that have to be returned. The next day, Russell is angry with Gidget for causing him that embarrassment. Gidget is upset because Russell always told her to stand up for something one believes in. Now he is going against that. Russell goes to meet Socrates. While there, a Gary Preeman (Burt Douglas) comes by. Russell learns that Socrates was the reason that Gary was inspired to get his medical degree. And Socrates helped other young people. Russell tells Gidget that plans for the art museum will incorporate a renovated Shaggy Dog Restauarant. Tim Rooney as Tommy.
24	"Ring-a-Ding Dingbat"	Hal Cooper	Barbara Avedon	February 24, 1966
The popular British rock group the Dingbats have arrived in Los Angeles. Gidget and Larue joined the screaming fans that greeted them at the airport. Gidget and Larue are in charge of the decorations for the school dance. All Gidget can think of is meeting the Dingbats. Gidget suggests using autographed pictures of the Dingbats as decorations. They just have to find out where the group is staying. They go to Mr. Goodpasture, a florist that caters to the stars. Larue is worried because Gidget is spending the decoration money. They follow the florist's truck to a gated mansion. Gidget comes up with a plan to raise more money by selling the location of the mansion to just a few friends. The girls are sworn to secrecy, but the information leaks out. On TV, a Newsman (C. Lindsay Workman) is interviewing Arthur and Herbie, the Dingbats. The Newsman asks why there is all the secrecy about where they are staying. It turns out Arthur is getting married the next day. He and Ellen (Lynne Marta) would like a quiet wedding. Gidget has a dream that Russell is the preacher that is marrying Arthur and Ellen and then there are screaming fans all over. The next day, Gidget wants to warn the Dingbats that they need to go to a different location. Gidget finds a way to get into the mansion. There she finds Shen Walters (Greg Mullavey), the Dingbats manager. The fans are already outside the mansion. Gidget comes up with a plan to dress as the Dingbats and lead the fans away from the mansion. Arthur and Ellen are able to get married in peace.
25	"Love and the Single Gidget"	Hal Cooper	Story by : Lee Karson; Teleplay by : John McGreevey and Stephen Kandel	March 3, 1966
Russell is out of town and he left Anne and John in charge of Gidget. Gidget wants to go for the weekend to a surfing tournament in Oceanside with Larue. Gidget is surprised, but thrilled, when Anne and John say she can go. Gidget does not know, but they hire Scott Baker (Carl Reindel), a college student, to look after her. On the beach in Oceanside, Scott introduces himself to Gidget. She then introduces her friends, Larue, Ellen and Betty (Barbara Hershey). He asks Gidget to be his date for the weekend as his girlfriend could not make it. He will be in the tournament, but there is dance that night. A Richie Ryan asks Gidget out, but she says she is taken. At the dance, other boys keep wanting to dance with Gidget. Scott does not mind as he is there and can keep an eye on her. Sally (Bridget Hanley), Scott's girlfriend, shows up. Mel (Ron Rifkin), Scott's friend, tells Sally that he thought she broke up with Scott. Scott explains to Sally that he was paid to look out for Gidget. Gidget overhears, confronts Scott and leaves crying. Larue talks Gidget out of going home. Back at the dance, Scott tries to apologize to Gidget. She leaves with Richie. She soon regrets it when Richie keeps making a play for her. Scott finds Gidget and rescues her. Back at home, Gidget gets even with Anne and John. Tim Rooney as Ken.
26	"Take a Lesson"	Jerrold Bernstein	Ruth Brooks Flippen	March 10, 1966
It is Friday night and Gidget does not have a date. Despite it only being 7:30, Gidget is in her pajamas. She then gets a call from Shirley (Beverly Washburn) telling her to come over right away. Gidget puts a coat over her pajamas and leaves. Shirley tells Gidget that her father is going to buy her a car. The surprise is that they are going to Pasadena right now to do it. Shirley's father Herman Marshall (Paul Lynde) calls for his wife Hannah (Jeff Donnell) and they start to leave. Shirley wants Gidget to go with, but Gidget does not want to go in her pajamas. Gidget calls Russell to tell him what is happening, but the phone is off the hook. Along the way, Gidget asks Herman if they could stop at a gas station to call Russell. It takes quite a while to find a station. When Gidget does not want to get out of the car in her pajamas, Herman agrees to make the call. Herman is upset when the line is busy. Herman gets lost trying to find the highway. The car runs out of gas, but not far from the gas station they were at earlier. Herman calls Russell again and the line is still busy. They leave. Gidget gets Willie, the station attendant, to call Russell. After talking to Willie, Russell decides to wait up for Gidget. Russell gets locked out of the house. Herman brings Gidget home. Things get awkward when Herman walks Gidget to the door and there is Russell in his pajamas.
27	"Independence — Gidget Style"	Bruce Bilson	Joanna Lee	March 17, 1966
Gidget wants to get Russell a camera for his birthday. She does not have enough money and only a week to get it. Gidget looks through the newspaper for a job. When she has no luck, she offers to wax and repair surfboards at the beach. She overhears two girls talk about a job at the Tomcat Club, a local gentlemen's club. At the club, Miss Conway (Viola Harris) can tell Gidget is too young. She suggests a local club for teenagers that just opened up. Gidget lies to the family and says she is going babysitting, but she is actually going to work at the club. Anne and John think something funny is going on. Russell learns that Gidget is not babysitting and she has been lying to him. Anne goes through Gidget's things and finds an application for the Tomcat Club. Anne, John and Russell go to the club, but only Russell goes in. He sees a girl from behind that he thinks is Gidget, but she is not. Russell tells Anne and John that Gidget is not in the club. Meanwhile, things are not going well for Gidget at the teen club and she gets fired. Later, the family sees Gidget at a bus stop outside the Tomcat Club. Back at home, the family confronts Gidget and she tells them about the teen club. She was not able to buy the camera, but she got another birthday gift for Russell. Richard Bull as Maitre d'. Celeste Yarnall as 2nd Girl. Rickie Sorensen as Boy Surfer.
28	"One More for the Road"	Bruce Bilson	Austin Kalish & Irma Kalish	March 24, 1966
Gidget goes to Buds 'n Blooms flower shop looking for a job. She speaks with Franklin Whiting (John McGiver), the owner. He was hoping for a boy, but he likes Gidget's initiative and gives her the job. Franklin mentions that she will have to drive a floral delivery truck. Gidget does not tell him she does not have a driver's license. At home Gidget asks if someone can teach her to drive and Russell reluctantly agrees to do it. Anne tells Gidget that Russell is not the person she wants teaching her how to drive. Gidget hopes he has mellowed since he taught Anne. Gidget talks Larue into doing the floral driving just until she learns how. Gidget's first driving leason does not go well and Russell gets a ticket. John then gives Gidget a lesson and it does not go well either. Franklin sees Larue in the truck and tells Gidget that she is not to take on passengers. Gidget and Larue take the truck to the beach. There she asks Eric to give her a driving lesson that night. He misunderstands and thinks she wants to park somewhere and get romantic. Russell tells Gidget that Franklin called. Russell wants Gidget to tell Franklin the truth that she cannot drive. Before she can say anything to Franklin, he has to leave as his wife is having a baby. He wants Gidget to make an important delivery. She cannot find anyone to drive for her. Russell comes by and drives for Gidget. Later, Gidget finally gets her license, but Franklin has hired someone else. Murray Alper as Cab Driver.
29	"Ask Helpful Hannah"	Lee Philips	Story by : Don Richman and Janet Carlson; Teleplay by : Austin Kalish & Irma Kalish	March 31, 1966
Gidget complains to Peggy Bell, the editor of the school paper, about the "Helpful Hannah" teen-advice column. Gidget thinks that the advice is not very good. Miss Harriett Beckley (Norma Connolly), the Faculty Advisor, overhears the conversation. Peggy tells Gidget that the girl who wrote the column quit. She had Norman Crowley fill in until she could find someone else. Norman does not like the criticism he gets from Gidget, so he quits. Gidget relectantly takes the job. Gidget tells the family and asks them not to tell anyone else. Larue finds out and offers to be Gidget's assistant. Gidget is very interested in one of the Helpful Hannah letters from a boy signed "Wretched". She tries to find out who the boy that wrote the letter is. Through a misunderstanding, Gidget may have caused Ted and Ellen (Barbara Hershey) to break up. While still trying find Wretched, Gidget causes a problem between Toby and Kathy. Russell goes to speak with Harriett about Gidget writing the column. He does not think Gidget is doing well, but Harriett thinks they should let her keep trying. Gidget finds out that a lot of the kids in school are tired of Helpful Hannah. Gidget learns that Wretched is really Norman and that Peggy likes him. But Peggy thinks that all Norman is interested in is rockets. It takes a bit of doing, but Gidget gets Norman and Peggy together.
30	"A Hard Night's Night"	Don Porter	Barbara Avedon	April 7, 1966
Russell is going to San Francisco for the weekend and Gidget plans to stay at Larue's house. Gidget and Larue get into a disagreement. Gidget read one of Larue's stories and thought it was over written. Gidget decides to go home. Meanwhile at the airport, Russell runs into an old friend named Stu (Frank De Vol). He is in town to take an insurance exame. Russell offers his house to Stu as Gidget is away at Larue's. Just as Gidget gets home, it starts to storm. Gidget is upstairs when Stu arrives. They do not run into each other just yet. Gidget gets spooked when a light she had on is now off. Gidget calls Larue and Larue agrees to come over. Neighbors Herb (Joseph Mell) and Fonya have just come home from a costume party. Fonya notices lights on at the Lawrence home. She gets worried as the house was supposed to be empty for the weekend. Just then the power goes out and the lights turn off at Gidget's house. Fonya wants Herb to go check the house even though he still has on a werewolf costume. Larue and Stu both see a werewolf looking in the window. Herb finds an open door and the power comes back on. More strange things happen. Stu sees Herb as a werewolf and faints. Gidget and Larue finally run into Herb and Fonya. Two policemen (Bill Zuckert and Vince Howard) arrive. They think Stu is a crook and take him away. When Russell comes home, Gidget learns who Stu was. Victor Jory as Man in Airport waiting area.
31	"I Have This Friend Who . . ."	Christopher Cary	Story by : Gary Flaum; Teleplay by : John McGreevey	April 14, 1966
Gidget and her boyfriend Toby Whitley have been spending a lot of time together. Lately, Toby's father Mel (Herb Voland) has been tagging along on the dates. Toby thinks it is because his mother has been away visiting her sister. Toby does not want to hurt his father's feelings. Gidget asks John for advice. John tells Anne that he thinks Gidget is talking about Russell. John wants to find a way to keep Russell busy so he is not always with Gidget. Russell tells John he was going to play poker, but he will help John with his research project. Toby calls Gidget and tells her they will finally be alone because Mel is going to play poker with Russell. That night, Toby shows up with his father because Russell backed out of the poker game. A police Officer (Joel Fluellen) thinks that Toby and Gidget are in a parked car to get romantic. Then the Officer sees Mel in the back seat. Mel tells the Officer that the car stalled. Russell is getting tired of spending so much time on John's project. After speaking to Gidget, John misunderstands and thinks that Russell is still finding a way to spend time with her. Russell figures out that it was Gidget and Toby's problem with Mel hanging around. Russell has a talk with Mel and they go out bowling, leaving the kids along.
32	"Don't Defrost the Alligator"	Jerrold Bernstein	Ruth Brooks Flippen	April 21, 1966
Gidget learns that her neighbor, little Davey, had a pet baby alligator named Charley and it died. Davey's mother wants him to bury Charley, but Davey would like to have him encased in plastic. His dad is out of town and his mother does not have the money. Gidget offers to keep Charley in her freezer until Davey's dad comes home. Gidget tells Russell about the pot in the freezer that has Charley. Harry McCann, from the California Bureau of Animal Protection, asks Davey about the alligator. Davey sends him to see Gidget. Gidget thinks Harry is a reporter from the magazine that is to interview Russell about the young people of today. Things get a little confusing until Gidget finds out who Harry really is. She tells him that Charley has died and he is in the freezer. Meanwhile, Davey thinks Harry is going to take Charley away and he takes the pot out of the freezer. Brian Mack (Robert Cornthwaite), from the magazine, calls. He tells Gidget that Jeff Tracy (Marvin Kaplan), the reporter that is to interview Russell, will be late. Anne needs something to make for dinner, so she grabs a pot out of Russell's freezer. Jeff arrives and somehow the topic of Charley comes up. Gidget discovers that Charley is gone. She calls Anne. Anne starts to panic thinking that Charley is in the oven. John puts the contents of the pot down the garbage disposal. Gidget worries how Davey will react. Gidget recruits Harry to try and find another dead alligator. Things get very confusing until Gidget finds out that Davey had Charley the whole time.

== Home media ==
On March 21, 2006, Sony Pictures Home Entertainment released Gidget: The Complete Series featuring all 32 episodes of the series, on DVD in Region 1. The release included the original pilot episode and a short interview with Field.

On August 27, 2013, Mill Creek Entertainment announced it had acquired the rights to various television series from the Sony Pictures library, including Gidget. They subsequently re-released the complete series on DVD on May 20, 2014.

DVD name	Ep #	Release date
The Complete Series	32	March 21, 2006; May 20, 2014 (re-release)

== Reception ==
Gidget faced stiff competition during its initial run. The show originally aired on Wednesdays at 8:30 pm, opposite The Beverly Hillbillies (CBS) and The Virginian (NBC), two established shows with strong ratings. The series was moved to Thursdays at 8:00 pm starting with episode 18 ("Like Voodoo"), where it performed poorly opposite CBS's Gilligan's Island, despite airing after the top-five rated Batman.

ABC cancelled Gidget in April 1966, just as the show began to find a large teen audience. Summer reruns launched the show into the top 10 as viewers looked for programs they had not seen during their original fall/winter broadcasts. ABC had a belated hit on its hands, but refused to renew the show because it would have to admit its cancellation was premature. In addition, industry practice at the time rarely allowed for cancelled shows to be resurrected.

Rather than squander the newly found audience for which ABC was hurting at the time, the network scrambled to find a new starring vehicle for Field. The result was The Flying Nun (1967–70), where Field reluctantly portrayed Sister Bertrille for three seasons. Field later commented that she has great affection for her young persona and was proud of her work on Gidget, but was embarrassed with The Flying Nun.

The May 28 – June 3, 1966, issue of TV Guide featured Sally Field

== Merchandise ==
Dell Comics published two issues of a comic book based on the series.

Two board games were made from the show. A self-titled game published by Standard Toykraft in 1965, and "Gidget Fortune Teller" game published by Milton Bradley Company in 1966.

A single example of a test issue Gidget trading card by Topps has surfaced.

== See also ==
- Surf culture
- Psycho Beach Party, a film by Charles Busch parodying the teen beach-party movies of the 1960s
