= Don Stroud =

American actor, musician, and surfer (born 1943)

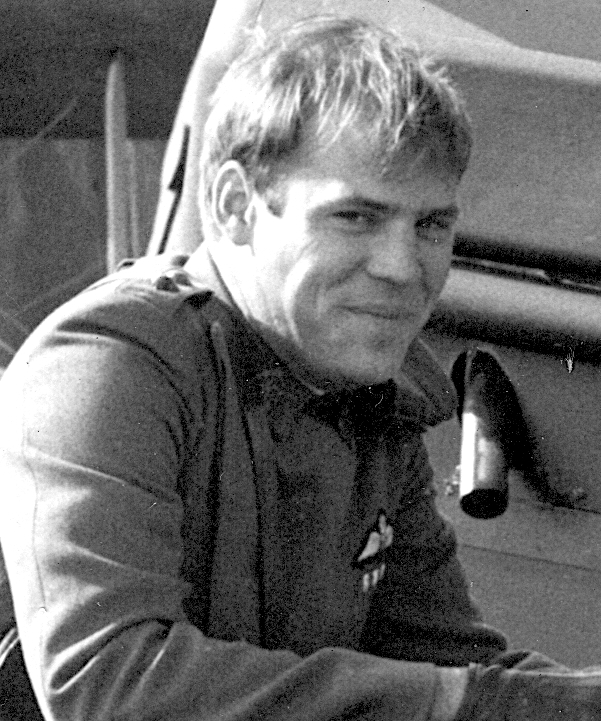
- Stroud in 1970
- Born: Donald Lee Stroud; September 1, 1943 (age 83); Honolulu, Territory of Hawaii
- Occupations: Actor; musician; surfer
- Years active: 1967–present
- Height: 6 ft 2 in (188 cm)
- Spouses: Sally Ann Stroud (m. 1973–1979) Linda Hayes (m. 1982–1992) Teri Sullivan (m. 1994)
- Parents: Clarence Stroud (father); Ann McCormack (mother)

Donald Lee Stroud (born September 1, 1943) is an American actor, musician, and surfer. Stroud has appeared in over 100 films and 200 television shows.

== Early years ==
Stroud is the son of vaudeville actor Clarence Stroud (of "The Stroud Twins" team) and singer Ann McCormack. He was born and raised in Honolulu, Hawaii, by his mother and stepfather, Paul Livermore.

At the age of 16, Stroud earned a black belt in the Hawaiian martial art of Kajukenbo.

Stroud began surfing at the age of 3 and taught the sport while he was still in high school. In 1960 at the age of 17, Stroud won the Mākaha Junior Championship and placed fourth overall in the Duke Kahanamoku International competition.

While Stroud was working at the Kahala Hilton beach as a lifeguard, producers hired him to double for Troy Donahue during that actor's surfing sequences at Waikiki Beach for an episode of Hawaiian Eye. Afterwards, Donahue asked Stroud to move to Los Angeles to become an actor while also serving as Donahue's fight double and bodyguard. After holding jobs parking cars and managing the club at the Whisky A Go-Go in Hollywood, he received advice on getting a start as an actor from Sidney Poitier, who frequented the club. Poitier set Stroud up with Dick Clayton, who was also an agent for such actors as James Dean, Michael Douglas, Al Pacino, and Burt Reynolds, among others.

== Career ==
At 6'2", and around 200 pounds, Stroud often portrayed villains and tough guys.

Stroud's Hollywood film debut was a role in Games (1967) as Norman. That same year, he appeared in The Ballad of Josie (1967) as Bratsch.

In 1968, he signed with Universal Pictures on a five-film contract, and he took a role in Madigan that same year. Stroud also appeared with Clint Eastwood in two films, Coogan's Bluff (1968) and Joe Kidd (1972).

Stroud co-starred in two Roger Corman films, Bloody Mama (1970) and Von Richthofen and Brown (1971). In the latter, he played Roy Brown opposite John Phillip Law's Baron von Richthofen. Corman used Lynn Garrison's Irish aviation facility. Garrison taught Stroud the rudiments of flying so that he could manage to take off and land the aircraft, making some of the footage more realistic.

Stroud and Robert Conrad performed in the speedboat chase through Fort Lauderdale in the film Murph the Surf (1975). In the film, he starred in the role of real-life jewel thief Jack Murphy. Conrad and Stroud also had a martial arts fight in Sudden Death (1977). Stroud would have another fight with Park Jong-soo in Search and Destroy (1979).

He starred in the horror/thriller Death Weekend (1976) (aka The House By the Lake), and had a supporting role in the cult horror film The Amityville Horror (1979) as Father Bolen. Other films in the genre include The Killer Inside Me (1976), and Sweet Sixteen (1983).

In The Buddy Holly Story (1978), Stroud co-starred as the late musician's drummer, while actually playing the drums live in front of two or three thousand kids brought in by buses, recording the soundtrack directly using 24-track recording trucks at the venue.

In the James Bond film series he played a villain in Licence to Kill (1989).

On television, Stroud's debut came in 1967 in the Barry Sullivan NBC western series The Road West as Nino. Under contract at Universal, Stroud appeared in Barnaby Jones, Cannon, Charlie's Angels, Ironside, Hawaii Five-O, Marcus Welby, M.D., Starsky & Hutch, and The Streets of San Francisco, among others. Stroud had many other guest appearances, including The Fall Guy, Gunsmoke, Hotel, and The Virginian. He had a reoccurring role as Mike Varrick in the miniseries Mrs. Columbo (1979-1980) which starred Kate Mulgrew.

Stroud played Captain Pat Chambers in Mickey Spillane's Mike Hammer and The New Mike Hammer with Stacy Keach. In the television pilot movie Gidget's Summer Reunion (1985) he played The Great Kahuna, and also revised the role in series The New Gidget (1986). He also has roles in Nash Bridges (1996–2001) and Pensacola: Wings of Gold (1996–2000).

In 2011, Stroud made a brief appearance in the new Hawaii Five-0. Stroud played a bartender in the second season's fourth episode, "Mea Makamae" (meaning "Treasure" in Hawaiian).

== Personal life ==
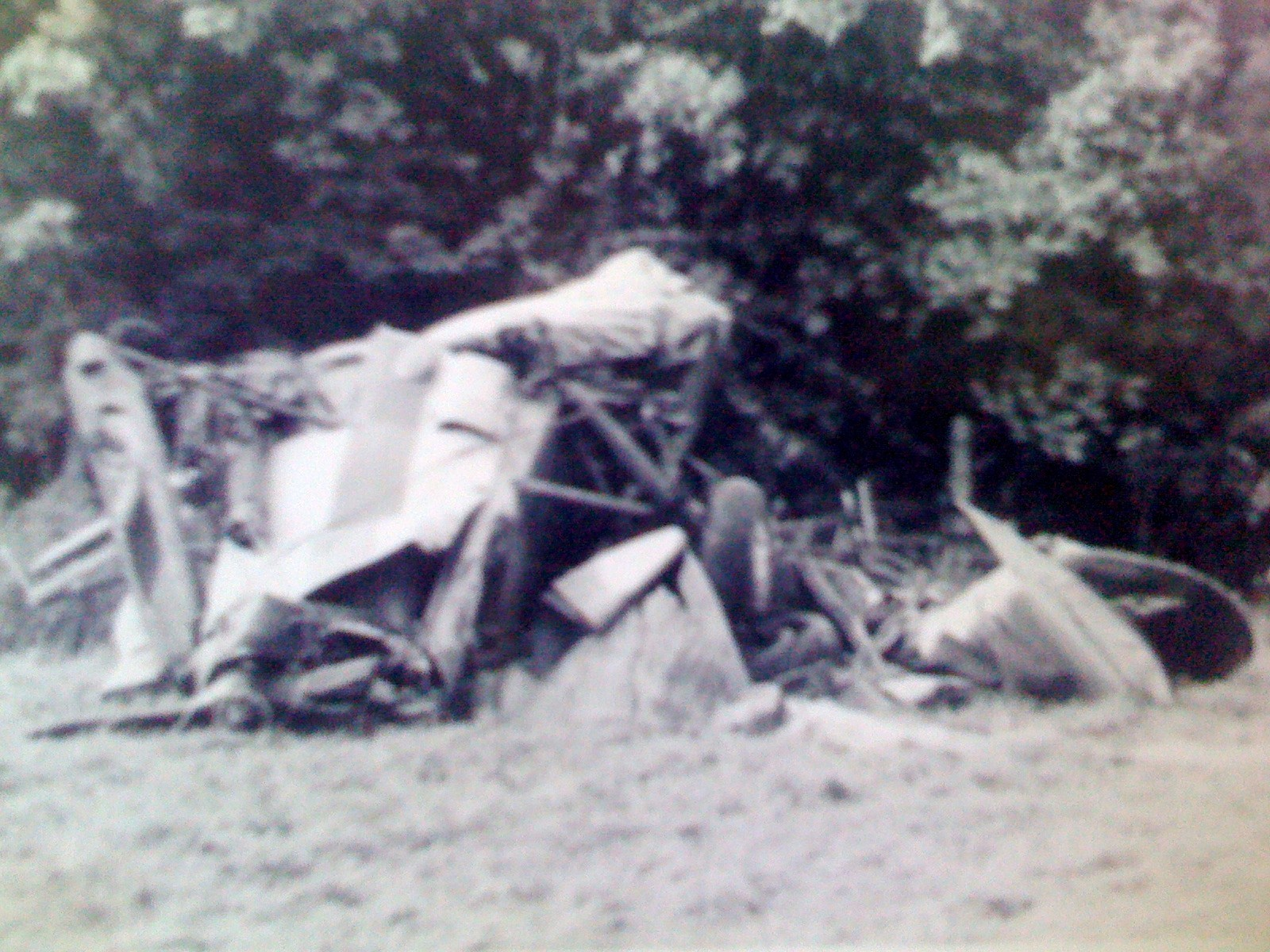
Lynn Garrison, Don Stroud crash September 16, 1970, SV4.C Stampe

On September 16, 1970, during a low-level sequence flying a two-seat SV.4C Stampe biplane across Lake Weston, a duck flew through the propeller's arc, striking the pilot Garrison in the face, knocking him unconscious. The aircraft flew into five power lines, snap rolled and plunged inverted into Ireland's large Liffey River. Stroud rescued the unconscious Garrison, treading water until rescue crews found them almost an hour later. Stroud was unhurt, but Garrison required 60 stitches to close a head wound.

In 1989 or 1990, on the street in Greenwich Village, New York City, Stroud tried to help a man who was being mugged. During the confrontation, Stroud was stabbed several times, suffering partial paralysis in the face and permanent blindness in one eye. The mugging victim fled.

== Filmography ==
A partial filmography follows.

=== Film ===
- The Ballad of Josie (1967) - Bratsch
- Banning (1967) - Man at Golf Course (uncredited)
- Games (1967) - Norman
- Madigan (1968) - Hughie
- Journey to Shiloh (1968) - 'Todo' McLean
- What's So Bad About Feeling Good? (1968) - Barney
- Coogan's Bluff (1968) - James Ringerman
- Explosion (1969) - Richie Kovacs
- ...tick...tick...tick... (1970) - 'Bengy' Springer
- Bloody Mama (1970) - Herman Barker
- Angel Unchained (aka Hell's Angels Unchained) (1970) - Angel
- Von Richthofen and Brown (1971) - Roy Brown
- Joe Kidd (1972) - Lamarr
- Slaughter's Big Rip-Off (1973) - Kirk
- Scalawag (1973) - Velvet
- Live A Little, Steal A Lot (1975) - Jack Murphy
- Taxi Driver (1976) - Policeman (uncredited)
- Death Weekend (1976) - Lep
- The Killer Inside Me (1976) - Elmer
- Hollywood Man (1976) - Barney
- Sudden Death (1977) - Dominic Aldo
- The Choirboys (1977) - Sam Lyles
- The Buddy Holly Story (1978) - Jesse Charles
- Search and Destroy (1979) - Buddy Grant
- The Amityville Horror (1979) - Father Bolen
- The Night the Lights Went Out in Georgia (1981) - Seth Ames
- Sweet Sixteen (1983) - Billy Franklin
- Armed and Dangerous (1986) - Sergeant Rizzo
- Two to Tango (1988) - James Conrad
- Licence to Kill (1989) - Colonel Heller
- Twisted Justice (1990) - Luther Pontelli
- Down the Drain (1990) - Dick Rogers
- Cartel (1990) - Tony King
- Mob Boss (1990) - Legrand
- The King of the Kickboxers (1990) - Anderson
- Prime Target (1991) - Manny
- The Roller Blade Seven (1991) - Desert Maurader
- Return of the Roller Blade Seven (1992) - Conga Man
- The Legend of the Roller Blade Seven (1992) - Kabuki Devil
- Return to Frogtown (1992) - Brandy Stone
- The Divine Enforcer (1992) - Otis
- The Flesh Merchant (1993) - Delambre
- It's Showtime (1993) - Banger
- Cyber Seeker (1993) - Isaac
- Carnosaur 2 (1995) - Ben Kahane
- Soldier Boyz (1995) - Gaton
- Precious Find (1996) - Loo Seki
- Little Bigfoot (1997) - McKenzie
- Wild America (1997) - Stango
- Perdita Durango (Dance with the Devil) (1997) - Santos
- The Haunted Sea (1997) - Chief Foster
- Detonator (1998) - 'Whip' O'Leary
- Land of the Free (1998) - Repairman (uncredited)
- Sutures (2009) - Voightman
- Django Unchained (2012) - Sheriff Bill Sharp / Willard Peck
- Glen Now and Then (2017) - Glen (Short) (Completed)

=== Television ===
Year	Title	Role	Notes
1966	The Virginian	Cate	"The Long Way Home"
1967	Bob Hope Presents the Chrysler Theatre	Greg Travis	"Wipeout"
1967	Ironside	Bains	"An Inside Job"
1967	The Road West	Nino	"Eleven Miles to Eden"
1967	Run for Your Life	Jim Hammack	"Fly by Night"
1967	The Virginian	Frank Hollis	"Paid in Full"
1968	Ironside	Albee	"Split Second to an Epitaph" (parts 1 & 2)
1968	The Virginian	Rafe Judson / Wally McCullough	"Image of an Outlaw"
1970	Hawaii Five-O	Nick Pierson	"The Late John Louisiana"
1971	Dan August	Nicky	Episode: "The Meal Ticket"
1971	McMillan & Wife	Billy Benton	Episode: “Death Is a Seven Point Favorite”
1971	The Deadly Dream	Kagan	ABC Movie of the Week
1972	The Daughters of Joshua Cabe	Blue Wetheral	ABC Movie of the Week
1972	Rolling Man	Harold Duncan	ABC Movie of the Week
1973	Cannon	Marty Brand	"Come Watch Me Die"
1973	Hawaii Five-O	Tally Green	"The Flip Side Is Death"
1974	Barnaby Jones	Chuck Summers	"Programmed for Killing"
1974	Gunsmoke	Pete Murphy	"Jesse"
1974	The Elevator	Pete Howarth	ABC Movie of the Week
1974	Gunsmoke	Foss	"Town in Chains"
1974	Police Woman	Frank Asher	"Warning: All Wives"
1975	Police Woman	Vern Lightfoot	"Blaze of Glory"
1976	Hawaii Five-O	Nathan Purdy	"Target - A Cop"
1978	Katie: Portrait of a Centerfold	Sullie Toulours	TV movie
1981	The Fall Guy	Randy Soames	"Colts Angels"
1983	Matt Houston	Dirk Bronson	"Get Houston"
1983	Matt Houston	Cord Cody	"Heritage"
1983	The A-Team	Deke Watkins	"A Nice Place to Visit"
1984	Mike Hammer	Captain Pat Chambers	
1985	The A-Team	Walter Tyler	"Knights of the Road"
1985	Gidget's Summer Reunion	The Great Kahuna	TV movie
1985	Hunter	Sheriff Johnson	"The Biggest Man in Town"
1985	Murder, She Wrote	Carey Drayson	"Murder Takes The Bus"
1986	The New Gidget	The Great Kahuna	4 episodes (1986-1987)
1987	The Law & Harry McGraw	Rudy Udovic	"Old Heroes Never Lie"
1989	The New Dragnet	Captain Lussen	52 episodes (1989-1990)
1991	Quantum Leap	Coach	"Play Ball"
1993	In the Heat of the Night	Ron Griff	"Even Nice People"
1993	Renegade	Kattrain	"Windy City Blues"
1994	Babylon 5	Caliban	"TKO"
1995	The Alien Within	Louis	TV movie
1995	The Adventures of Brisco County, Jr.	Randy Hatchett	"Riverboat"
1996	Babylon 5	Boggs	"Ceremonies of Light and Dark"
1998	National Lampoon's Men in White	Old Bob	TV movie
