= Janis Hansen (talent manager) =

American talent agent and actress (1940–2021)

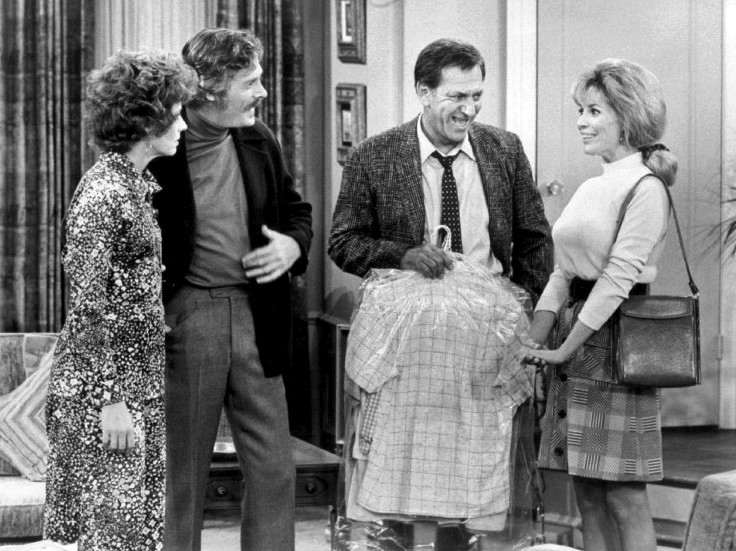
Scene from The Odd Couple with actors (right to left): Hansen, Jack Klugman, Fred Beir, and Joan Hotchkis.

Janis Annie Hansen (June 14, 1940 – November 30, 2021) was an American talent agent and actress.

== Early life ==
Raised in Jamestown, and later Lakewood, both in Chautauqua County, New York, Hansen is the daughter of Roger, an accountant, and Jeanette Hansen. She and her one sibling, elder sister Sheryn Rae, attended Southwestern High School in Jamestown, New York, graduating in 1955 (Sheryn) and 1958 (Janis).

== Acting career ==
A one-time Playboy bunny, Hansen appeared on Broadway in The Riot Act (March–April 1963), a short-lived comedy, starring Dorothy Stickney, Ruth Donnelly, Sylvia Miles, and another young ingenue, Linda Lavin.

Hansen may be best known for her recurring role as "Gloria", the ex-wife of Felix Unger on The Odd Couple (1970–1975). She had guest roles on such television programs as Bonanza, The Big Valley, Gidget, It Takes a Thief, The FBI (Season 5 episode 12, "The Inside Man" a.k.a. episode 126 as "Andrea Gray"), Death Valley Days (s17e11 “The World’s Greatest Swimming Horse”) and I Dream of Jeannie. She portrayed "Sister Katherine Grace" in the 1970 film Airport. She last acted in 1982.

== Talent management ==
Hansen founded Hansen Management, a talent management company in Los Angeles, serving as agent, coach and manager.

== Personal life and death ==
Hansen was married to Joseph Roland Mikolas (1927–1996), an actor known for his appearances on the Ernie Kovacs Show. They remained together until his death in 1996. The couple had two children. She remarried, on July 27, 2002, to Andrew Michael Roemer.

Hansen died in Los Angeles on November 30, 2021, at the age of 81.

== Filmography ==
- Oh Dad, Poor Dad, Mamma's Hung You in the Closet and I'm Feelin' So Sad (1967) - The Other Woman
- Airport (1970) - Sister Katherine Grace
- Cannon for Cordoba (1970) - Girl
