= Dean Butler (actor) =

Canadian-American actor (born 1956)

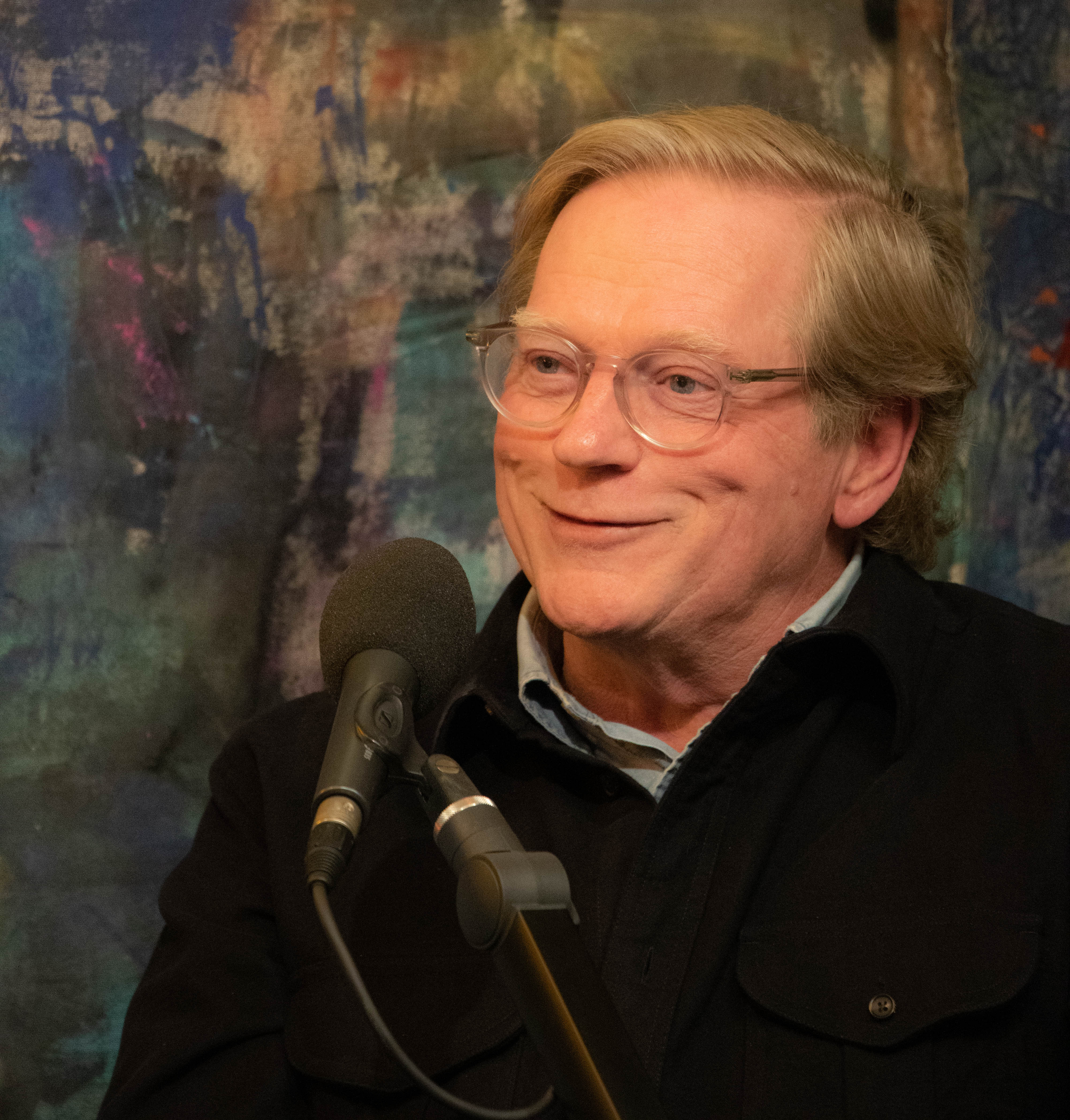
- Butler in 2024
- Born: May 20, 1956 (age 70); Prince George, British Columbia, Canada
- Occupations: Actor; producer; screenwriter
- Years active: 1976–2008 (actor); 2005–present (producer)
- Spouse: Katherine Cannon (m. 2001)

Dean Butler (born May 20, 1956) is a Canadian-American actor and producer of entertainment, sports and documentary programming. He is best known for being Almanzo Wilder in the NBC series Little House on the Prairie.

== Biography ==
=== Early life ===
Born in Prince George, British Columbia, and raised in Piedmont, California, Butler studied communication arts at the University of the Pacific in Stockton, California.

=== Career ===
Butler's career as an actor started with a small part on the TV series The Streets of San Francisco. His first major role was in the 1978 TV movie Forever, based on Judy Blume's novel of the same title.

Butler is best known for his portrayal of Almanzo Wilder on the NBC family drama Little House on the Prairie, which was based on the classic Little House books by Laura Ingalls Wilder. He appeared in the final four seasons of the show and the three post-series TV movies. After Little House ended, he played Jeff "Moondoggie" Griffin in the TV series The New Gidget and Buffy’s father, Hank Summers, on Buffy the Vampire Slayer.

During the 1980s and 1990s, Butler was a guest star on various television series, including Murder, She Wrote; Who's the Boss?; The Love Boat; and JAG. He co-starred with the late Gary Coleman in The Kid with the 200 I.Q.. He appeared in the movies Desert Hearts and The Final Goal.

Onstage, Butler has performed in the shows of Stephen Sondheim. He appeared on Broadway in the original company of Into the Woods as Rapunzel's Prince, internationally as Tony in West Side Story and regionally in Company.

=== Directing and producing ===
Butler now works largely behind the camera producing entertainment, sports, and documentary programming. Butler produces Feherty for Golf Channel, starring David Feherty. In addition, he is a West Coast correspondent for Broadway World, a provider of web content about the performing arts.

Butler has directed, produced, written, and narrated bonus features for Little House on the Prairie DVD collections. He narrated a six-part documentary, The Little House Phenomenon.

Butler has produced two documentaries, Little House on the Prairie: The Legacy of Laura Ingalls Wilder and Almanzo Wilder: Life Before Laura, which drew their inspiration from the Little House books of Laura Ingalls Wilder. Additionally, in 2012, Butler co-executive produced Pa's Fiddle: The Music of America for PBS.

== Personal life ==
Butler is married to actress Katherine Cannon, who played Felice Martin on the television series Beverly Hills 90210. They met when Cannon auditioned for the female lead in the Michael Landon series Father Murphy. They live in Los Angeles, California.

== Acting credits ==
Year	Title	Role	Notes
1978	Forever	Michael Wagner	TV movie
1979–1983	Little House on the Prairie	Almanzo Wilder	Main cast (65 episodes)
1980	CHiPs	Dean Butler	Episode: "The Great 5K Star Race and Boulder Wrap Party: Part 2"
1981	Here's Boomer	Gary	Episode: "Good Looking"
1982	The Love Boat	Stan Barber	Episode: "Familiar Faces"
1983	The Kid with the 200 I.Q.	Steve Bensfield	TV movie
1983	Fantasy Island	Carl Peters	Episode: "The Devil Stick/Touch and Go"
1983	The Love Boat	Scott Pryor	Episode: "Kisses and Makeup"
1983	Little House: Look Back to Yesterday	Almanzo Wilder	TV movie
1984	Little House: The Last Farewell	Almanzo Wilder	TV movie
1984	Little House: Bless All the Dear Children	Almanzo Wilder	TV movie
1984	Fantasy Island	Harley Batten	Episode: "Sing Melancholy Baby/The Last Dogfight"
1984	Who's the Boss?	Jason	Episode: "Mona Gets Pinned"
1985	Hotel	Michael Korsak	Episode: "Anniversary"
1985	Gidget's Summer Reunion	Jeff "Moondoggie" Griffin	TV movie
1985	Desert Hearts	Darrell	Feature film
1986	The Love Boat	Brent Harper	Episode: "Couples/Made for Each Other"
1986–1988	The New Gidget	Jeff "Moondoggie" Griffin	Main cast (44 episodes)
1987	Hotel	Gary Marsh	Episode: "All the King's Horses"
1989	ABC Afterschool Specials	Matthew Green	Episode: "Private Affairs"
1990	Murder, She Wrote	Howard Griffin	Episode: "The Fixer-Upper"
1991	Shades of LA	Dr. Ted Kolfax	Episode: "Till Death Do Us Part"
1991	Without a Pass	Officer #1 (1965)	Feature film
1992	Tequila and Bonetti	Frank Avalon	Episode: "Brooklyn and the Beast"
1994	Diagnosis: Murder	Sly	Episode: "Georgia on My Mind"
1994	Juana la Cubana	Mark Taylor	Feature film
1995	The Final Goal	Valentine	Feature film
1996	Renegade	Cop	Episode: "Baby Makes Three"
1997–2002	Buffy the Vampire Slayer	Hank Summers	Recurring role (5 episodes)
1997	Fame L.A.	Producer	Episode: "Seize the Day"
2000	Cover Me	FBI Agent	Episode: "The Line"
2000	Ricky 6	Vic Portelance	Feature film
2003	JAG	Navy Appellate Court Judge #2	Episode: "Lawyers, Guns and Money"
2008	Chemical Wedding	Ceremony Man	Feature film (aka Crowley)

=== Theatre ===
Year	Title	Role	Notes
1988	West Side Story	Tony	International tour
1988-1989	Into the Woods	Rapunzel's Prince u/s The Wolf / Cinderella's Prince	Broadway
1993	Company	Peter	Los Angeles

== Book ==
- Butler, Dean (2024). Prairie Man: My Little House Life & Beyond. Citadel Press. ISBN 978-0-8065-4329-1.
