= Sue Hamilton (actress) =

American model and actress (born 1945)

Sue Williams
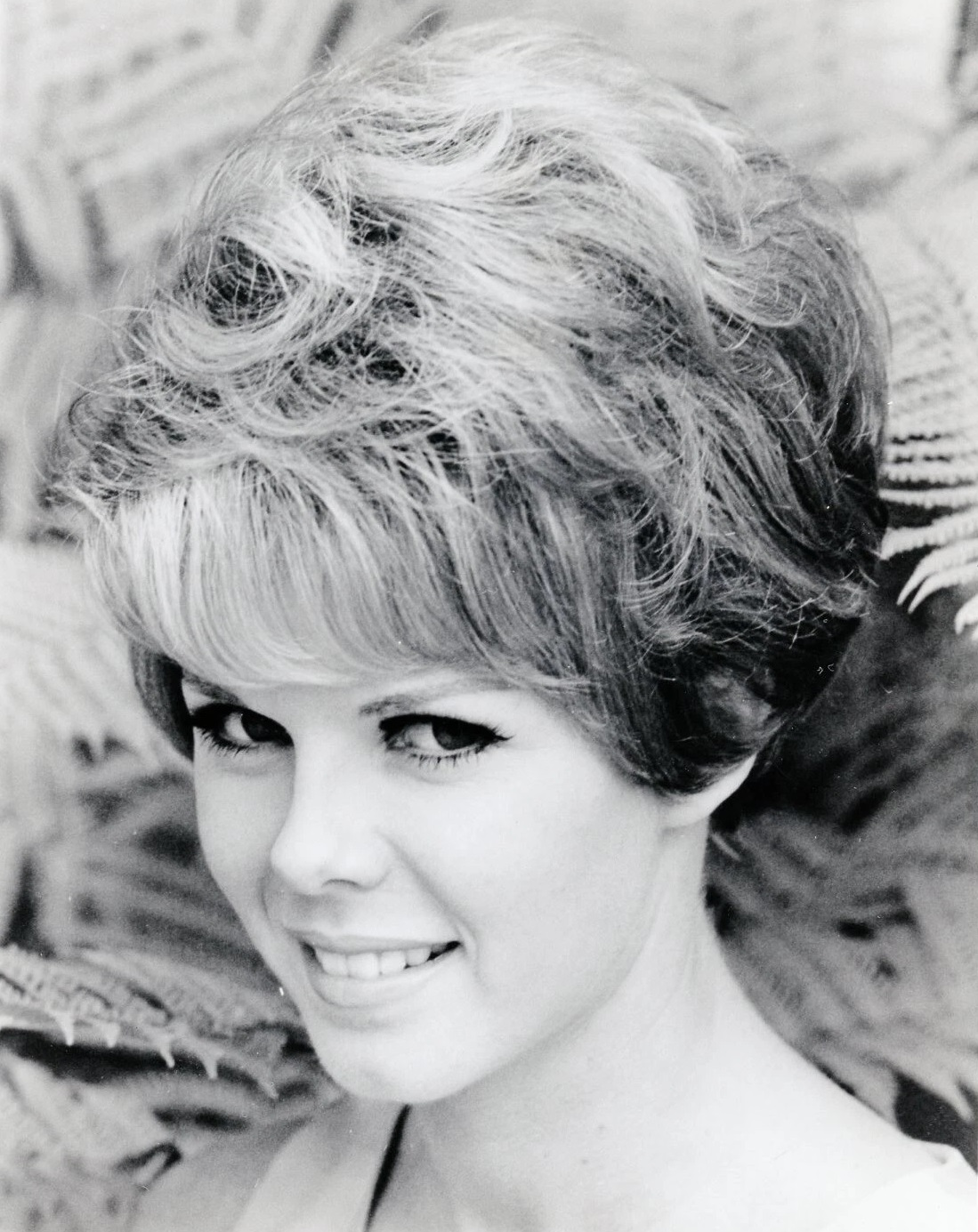
- Hamilton in 1965

Playboy centerfold appearance
- April 1965
- Preceded by: Jennifer Jackson
- Succeeded by: Maria McBane

Personal details
- Born: May 13, 1945 (age 81) Glendale, California, U.S.
- Height: 4 ft 11 in (150 cm)

Sue Hamilton (born May 13, 1945), also known as Sue Williams, is an American actress and model of Playboy magazine's Playmate of the Month for April 1965.

== Early life and Playboy ==
Hamilton was born in Glendale, California and attended Glendale High School between 1957 and 1959. In 1964 Hamilton modeled for photographers Bill and Melba Figge, whom she met through her sister who worked as an artist at Figge Studio, then located in Glendale. According to Melba Figge, quoted in an interview with Lindsay Sandham in 2005, "We sent the first [photo] in ... and Hugh Hefner said, 'She's really cute. We'd like to see your work.'" Hamilton, using the name Sue Williams, was the first of 48 Playboy centerfolds to be photographed by Figge Studio. According to Playboy, she was the first Playmate to have breast implants and the first who was less than five feet tall (152 cm), at just 4'11 (150cm).

== Acting career ==
After appearing in Playboy, as Sue Williams was signed immediately by American International Pictures and appeared in How to Stuff a Wild Bikini as "Peanuts", alongside other Playboy Playmates Marianne Gaba and Jo Collins. She appeared in four more AIP movies released in between 1965 and 1966, credited as Sue Hamilton. Sue Hamilton appeared in nationally syndicated magazine articles promoting American International Pictures releases, including "Starlets Seek Natural Look" and "Use Makeup The Professional Way." Sue Hamilton also appeared in the "Super-face" print advertising campaign for "Sheer Magic" make-up, as did fellow AIP starlet Patti Chandler, to promote The Ghost in the Invisible Bikini and Fireball 500.

== Filmography ==
Year	Title	Role	Notes
1965	How to Stuff a Wild Bikini	Peanuts	
1965	Sergeant Deadhead	Ivy	Alternative title: Sergeant Deadhead, the Astronut
1965	Dr. Goldfoot and the Bikini Machine	Robot	Alternative title: Dr. G. and the Bikini Machine
1965	The Wild Weird World of Dr. Goldfoot		Television movie
1965 to 1966	Gidget		3 episodes
1966	The Ghost in the Invisible Bikini	Sue	
1966	Fireball 500	Farmer's Daughter	

== See also ==
- List of people in Playboy 1960–1969

Sally Duberson	Jessica St. George	Jennifer Jackson	Sue Williams	Maria McBane	Hedy Scott
Gay Collier	Lannie Balcom	Patti Reynolds	Allison Parks	Pat Russo	Dinah Willis
