= Caryn Richman =

American actress

- Occupations: Actress; singer
- Years active: 1977–present
- Television: The New Gidget; The Bradys; Texas; A Very Brady Christmas; The Young and the Restless; American Crime Story

Caryn Richman is an American actress and singer who is best known for her role as Gidget in the TV series, The New Gidget, which evolved out of her lead role in the 1985 television movie Gidget's Summer Reunion. She played Elena Dekker on the soap opera Texas (1980-1982), and Nora Brady, Greg Brady's wife in A Very Brady Christmas and in the TV series, The Bradys.

In the 1970s, Richman was part of Tuxedo Junction, a three-part vocal group that sang 40s music in disco style. Richman starred in a Broadway production of Grease, and used her singing ability in Texas, where she played a successful country singer. Richman performed several songs in Texas.

Richman has made numerous guest appearances on such TV shows as The Eddie Capra Mysteries, Matlock, Jake and the Fatman, Hitman, Angel Fire, and The Adventures of Mr. Clown. She also played the part of Victoria in the film The Black Water Vampire. She is also a TV commercial spokesperson for the prescription medication Atelvia, and has appeared as a spokesperson for Papa Murphy's Pizza, and Walmart. In late 2016, she starred in a short comedy film with Eddie Deezen and Larry (The Soup Nazi) Thomas.

== Filmography ==
Year	Film	Role	Notes
1978	The Eddie Capra Mysteries	Millie Greer	Episode: "Breakout to Murder"
1980–1982	Texas	Elena Dekker	71 episodes
1983	The Rousters	Unknown	Episode: "A Picture Worth a Thousand Dollars"
1985	Gidget's Summer Reunion	Francine 'Gidget' Griffin	TV film
1986–1988	The New Gidget	Francine 'Gidget' Griffin	44 episodes
1987	Mickey Spillane's Mike Hammer	Stephanie Caldwell	Episode: "Green Blizzard"
1987	Matlock	Laurie Palmer	Episode: "The Reporter"
1988	A Very Brady Christmas	Nora Brady	TV film
1989	Hard Time on Planet Earth	Janet Gleason	Episode: "The All American"
1990	The Bradys	Nora Brady	6 episodes
1991	Jake and the Fatman	Janice	Episode: "I'm Gonna Live Till I Die"
1991	The Young and the Restless	Lauren Fenmore	Temporary replacement
1992	Hitman	Lorna	Short film
1992	Angel Fire	Unknown	Feature film
1995	Sleepstalker	Mrs. Davis, Griffin's Mother	Direct-to-video film
1998–2001	Hollywood Safari	Jayne Johnson	21 episodes
1998	Party of Five	Abby	Episode: "Love and War"
1999	Malibu, CA	Reporter	Episode: "Murray for Mayor"
2006	The Bitterness	Teacher	Short film
2010	Baby Blue	Tess	Short film
2011	Drowned	Sarah	Short film
2012	Bucket & Skinner's Epic Adventures	Blake's Mom	Episode: "Epic Cuffs"
2012	Surprising Merrily	Merrily Inclement	Feature film
2013	Darius	Mrs. Goldstein	Feature film
2013	The Adventures of Mr. Clown	Caryn	12 episodes
2014	Black Water Vampire	Victoria	Direct-to-video film
2014	Mic Whore	Woman Giving Party	Short film
2014	Maron	Mrs. Romano	Episode: "Marc's New Friend"
2015	Stalked by My Doctor	Nurse Taylor	Feature film
2016	Beyond the Gates	Marilyn	Feature film
2016	The Love Suckers	Sara Schwartz	Short film
2017	The Collection	Judy Stillman	Short film
2018	American Crime Story	Carol, David's Mother	Episode: "House by the Lake"
2018	Nanny Killer	Therapist	Feature film
