= Gidget Gets Married =

1972 film by E.W. Swackhamer

- Michael Burns and Monie Ellis
- Genre: Comedy
- Written by: John McGreevey
- Directed by: E.W. Swackhamer
- Starring: Michael Burns; Monie Ellis
- Theme music composer: Pete Carpenter; Mike Post
- Country of origin: United States
- Original language: English

Production
- Executive producer: Harry Ackerman
- Producer: E.W. Swackhamer
- Production location: Westlake Village, California
- Cinematography: Joseph F. Biroc
- Editor: Hugh Chaloupka
- Running time: 74 minutes
- Production company: Screen Gems

Original release
- Network: ABC
- Release: January 4, 1972

Related
- Gidget Grows Up; Gidget's Summer Reunion

Gidget Gets Married is a 1972 American made-for television comedy film produced by Screen Gems for ABC. It was written by John McGreevey, directed by E.W. Swackhamer and starred Monie Ellis as Gidget. Supporting actors and actresses were Michael Burns, Don Ameche, Paul Lynde, Joan Bennett, and Elinor Donahue.

== Plot ==
Now that Jeff has completed his military service and landed a lucrative job as an engineer, he and Gidget marry and move to Woodlake, Florida, where his new job is. Gidget finds that Jeff's company exerts far too much control over their lives, deciding where they will live and even choosing their friends for them. Gidget's rebellion against this lands Jeff in hot water, and their marriage is sorely tested.

== Cast ==
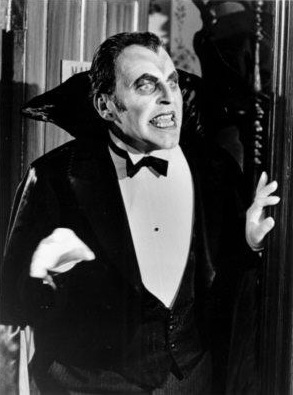
Paul Lynde dressed as Count Dracula

- Michael Burns as Jeff Stevens
- Monie Ellis as Gidget Stevens
- Don Ameche as Otis Ramsey
- Joan Bennett as Claire Ramsey
- Corinne Camacho as Nancy Lewis
- Macdonald Carey as Russ Lawrence
- Elinor Donahue as Medley Blaine
- Paul Lynde as Louis B. Latimer
- Roger Perry as Tom Blaine
- Gene Andrusco as Vince Blaine
- Radames Pera as Bob Ramsey
- Tiger Williams as Richie Coleman
- Dennis Fimple as Policeman
- Ivor Barry as Maitre 'D
- Burke Byrnesas Minister
- Larry Gelman as Anatole
- Helen Funai as Minnie Chan
- Joseph Bernard as Furniture Man
- Victoria Paige Meyerink as Janie (as Victoria Meyerink)
- Jimmy Bracken as Andy
- Michael Barbera as Chris
- Susan Spell as Little Girl
- Nicolas Beauvy as Gregg
- James Sikking as Jim Johnson
- Virginia Hawkins as Mrs. Johnson
- William Gray Espy as Chuck
- Judith McConnell as Ann (as Judy McConnell)
- Larry Delaney as John

== Production ==
Harry Ackerman was hired as the executive producer for Gidget Gets Married. E.W. Swackhamer was hired to direct and produce the film. John McGreevey was hired to the script. Gidget Gets Married was intended to be a pilot to launch a new Gidget series. Screen Gems was hired as the production company.

=== Casting ===
Other supporting cast members were Macdonald Carey, Tiger Williams, Dennis Fimple, Burke Byrnes, Larry Gelman, Radames Pera. Roger Perry, Gene Andrusco.

== See also ==
- List of television films produced for American Broadcasting Company
