= The New Gidget =

- Season 1 title screen
- Genre: Sitcom
- Written by: Carole Coates; Sheree Guitar; Chris Miller; Larry Mollin; Michael Sutton
- Directed by: Bob Chenault; Doug Rogers; Robert Duchowny; Ted Lange
- Starring: Caryn Richman; Dean Butler; Lili Haydn; Sydney Penny; William Schallert
- Theme music composer: Marek Norman; Craig Snyder; Jeffrey Vilinsky
- Opening theme: "One in a Million" performed by Marek Norman
- Country of origin: United States
- Original language: English
- No. of seasons: 2
- No. of episodes: 44

Production
- Executive producers: Harry Ackerman; Ralph Riskin
- Producers: Carole Coates; George Zateslo; Larry Mollin
- Running time: Approx. 21 minutes per episode
- Production companies: Ackerman/Riskin Productions; Columbia Pictures Television; Coca-Cola Telecommunications (season 2)

Original release
- Network: Syndication
- Release: September 13, 1986 – May 12, 1988

Related
- Gidget's Summer Reunion; Gidget

The New Gidget is an American sitcom sequel to the original 1965–66 sitcom Gidget. It aired in syndication from September 15, 1986, to May 12, 1988. The series was produced by original Gidget series producer Harry Ackerman and was launched after the made-for-television film Gidget's Summer Reunion, starring Caryn Richman as Gidget, aired in 1985.

== Plot ==
The series features Gidget, who is in her late 20s and married to her idol, Jeff Griffin aka "Moondoggie" (Dean Butler).

The couple live in Santa Monica, California, where Moondoggie works as an architect and Gidget runs the "Gidget Travel Agency" with her long-time best friend, Larue (Jill Jacobson).

Also living with her and Jeff is her niece, Danielle "Danni" Collins (Sydney Penny), her older sister, Anne's, daughter.

Anne and her husband were out of the country so Danni was living with her uncle and aunt so her schooling wouldn't be interrupted.

She and her best friend, Gayle, (Lili Haydn) are often getting into mischievous exploits that kind of remind Gidget of her own outlandish exploits when she was her niece's age.

Also living with the family was Gidget's father, retired English professor, Russ Lawrence (William Schallert) who offered advice and reminded Gidget that her own exploits were similar to what Danni's are presently.

== Cast ==
=== Main ===
- Caryn Richman as Francine "Gidget" Lawrence Griffin
- Dean Butler as Jeff "Moondoggie" Griffin
- Sydney Penny as Danielle "Dani" Collins
- Lili Haydn as Gayle Baker
- William Schallert as Russell "Russ" Lawrence
- Don Stroud as The Great Kahuna
- Jill Jacobson as Larue Wilson
- Richard Paul as Wilton Parmenter
- David Preston as Murph the Surf

=== Notable guest stars ===
- Judith Barsi
- Nina Blackwood
- Bob Denver
- Elinor Donahue
- Alice Ghostley
- Alan Hale
- Linda Kaye Henning
- Jan and Dean
- Patricia Morison
- The Safaris
- Timothy Stack
- Frank Stallone
- Jesse White
- Wolfman Jack

== Episodes ==
=== Season 1 (1986–87) ===
No. overall	No. in season	Title	Directed by	Written by	Original release date
1	1	"Windsurfing Lesson"	Robert Chenault	George Zateslo	September 13, 1986
2	2	"The Project"	Unknown	Unknown	September 20, 1986
3	3	"Crime and Punishment"	Unknown	Unknown	September 27, 1986
4	4	"On Account of Danni"	Robert Chenault	Joel Tappis & Linda Temkin	October 4, 1986
5	5	"Fighting City Hall"	Robert Chenault	Trish Vradenburg	October 11, 1986
6	6	"The List"	Doug Rogers	Jim Ritz	October 18, 1986
7	7	"Jeff's Anniversary Present"	Doug Rogers	George Zateslo	October 25, 1986
8	8	"The Concert"	Unknown	Unknown	November 1, 1986
9	9	"The Baby"	Doug Rogers	Sheree Guitar	November 8, 1986
10	10	"Super Gidget"	Doug Rogers	Ross Brown	November 15, 1986
11	11	"The '65 Mustang"	Unknown	Unknown	November 22, 1986
12	12	"Stand Up and Cheer"	Unknown	Unknown	November 29, 1986
13	13	"Kahuna for Sale"	Roger Duchowny	Jeri Barchilon & Michele Gendelman	December 6, 1986
14	14	"Passion for Fashion"	Roger Duchowny	Trish Vradenburg	December 13, 1986
15	15	"The Perfect Man"	Unknown	Unknown	December 20, 1986
16	16	"The Royal Bluff"	Roger Duchowny	Story by : Carole J. Coates & Larry Mollin; Teleplay by : Deanne Stillman	December 27, 1986
17	17	"Citizen Moondoggie"	Unknown	Unknown	January 3, 1987
18	18	"It's Only Rock 'n' Roll"	Roger Duchowny	Story by : Lenny Shulman; Teleplay by : Larry Mollin & Carole J. Coates	January 10, 1987
19	19	"Oddballs"	Unknown	Unknown	January 17, 1987
20	20	"Jake's Shakes"	Roger Duchowny	Joel Tappis & Linda Temkin	January 24, 1987
21	21	"Does Paul Know?"	Ted Lange	Story by : Jeri Barchilon & Michele Gendelman & Deanne Stillman; Teleplay by : Carole J. Coates & Larry Mollin	January 31, 1987
22	22	"Dead Man's Curl"	Ted Lange	Story by : Deanne Stillman; Teleplay by : Jeri Barchilon & Michele Gendelman	February 7, 1987

=== Season 2 (1987–88) ===
No. overall	No. in season	Title	Directed by	Written by	Original release date
23	1	"Gilligidge Island"	Doug Rogers	Story by : Larry Mollin; Teleplay by : Deanne Stillman	September 17, 1987
24	2	"Bred to Shred"	Ted Lange	Deanne Stillman	September 24, 1987
25	3	"Invasion of the Gidget People"	Unknown	Chris Miller & Michael Sutton	October 1, 1987
26	4	"Sealed with a Kiss"	Unknown	Jeff O'Hare	October 8, 1987
27	5	"Head Over Handlebars"	Unknown	Glenn Leopold & Kevin Hopps	October 26, 1987
28	6	"Drag City"	Unknown	Story by : Norm Chandler Fox; Teleplay by : George Zateslo	October 29, 1987
29	7	"Boy Talk"	Unknown	Unknown	November 5, 1987
30	8	"The Getaway"	Unknown	Story by : Larry Mollin; Teleplay by : Jeri Barchilon & Michele Gendelman	November 12, 1987
31	9	"Kahuna, Jr."	Jeri Barchilon & Michele Gendelman	Doug Rogers	November 19, 1987
32	10	"Malibu Man"	Ted Lange	Story by : Larry Mollin; Teleplay by : Deanne Stillman	November 26, 1987
33	11	"Potion Emotion"	Unknown	Jeri Barchilon & Michele Gendelman	December 3, 1987
34	12	"Calendar Boys"	Doug Rogers	Ron Burla	December 10, 1987
35	13	"A Christmas Curl"	Unknown	Unknown	December 17, 1987
36	14	"Radio Free Malibu"	Unknown	Unknown	January 7, 1988
37	15	"Gidget's Guide to Surfing"	Unknown	Unknown	January 21, 1988
38	16	"Blast From the Past"	Unknown	Unknown	February 4, 1988
39	17	"Rad Chad"	Unknown	Unknown	February 11, 1988
40	18	"Altered Surf"	Unknown	Unknown	February 18, 1988
41	19	"Perky Pirates of the Pipeline"	Unknown	Unknown	February 25, 1988
42	20	"Avocado Heads"	Unknown	Unknown	April 28, 1988
43	21	"The Bare Facts"	Unknown	George Zateslo	May 5, 1988
44	22	"Makes Waves, Not War"	Unknown	Jeri Barchilon & Michele Gendelman	May 12, 1988
