= Gidget =

- Gidget, first edition dustjacket
- First appearance: Gidget, The Little Girl With Big Ideas (1957)
- Last appearance: The New Gidget: "Make Waves, Not War" (1988)
- Created by: Frederick Kohner
- Portrayed by: Sandra Dee; Deborah Walley; Cindy Carol; Sally Field; Karen Valentine; Monie Ellis; Caryn Richman; Sabrina Kramnich
- Voiced by: Kathy Gori

In-universe information
- Full name: Franziska Hofer (novels); Frances Elizabeth Lawrence (TV and film)
- Nickname: Franzie; Gidget
- Gender: female
- Occupation: Student. Also waitress (Cher Papa), teacher (Gidget in Love and Gidget Gets Married), fashion model (Gidget Goes Parisienne), tour guide (Gidget Goes New York and Gidget Grows Up) and travel agent (Gidget's Summer Reunion and The New Gidget).
- Family: Professor Russell Lawrence (father); Anne Cooper (sister); John Cooper (brother-in-law)
- Spouse: Jeff "Moondoggie" Griffin (by the 1980s)
- Relatives: Danielle "Dani" Collins-Griffin (niece)

Gidget (/ˈɡɪdʒɪt/) is a fictional character created by author Frederick Kohner (based on his teenage daughter, Kathy) in his 1957 novel, Gidget, the Little Girl with Big Ideas. The novel follows the adventures of a teenage girl and her surfing friends on the beach in Malibu. The name Gidget is a portmanteau of "girl" and "midget". Following the novel's publication, the character appeared in several films, television series, and television movies.

== Novels ==
The original Gidget was created by Frederick Kohner in his 1957 novel Gidget, The Little Girl with Big Ideas (reprinted numerous times under the shortened title Gidget, by which it is more widely known), written in the first person and based on the accounts of his daughter Kathy (now Kathy Kohner-Zuckerman) of the surf culture of Malibu Point. The novel was published by Putnam. Kohner, a prolific screenwriter with one Academy Award nomination, published seven sequels to this novel, five of them original novels:

- Cher Papa (1959)
- The Affairs of Gidget (1963)
- Gidget in Love (1965)
- Gidget Goes Parisienne (1966)
- Gidget Goes New York (1968)

Kohner also wrote two novelizations adapted from films of the same titles, based on original stories by Ruth Brooks Flippen.

- Gidget Goes Hawaiian (1961)
- Gidget Goes to Rome (1963)

== Frederick Kohner ==
Kohner, a Czechoslovak Jew, worked in the German film industry as a screenwriter until 1933 when he emigrated to Hollywood after the Nazis started removing Jewish credits from films. Over the coming decades, Kohner and his wife Franzie raised their two daughters by the beach, while he toiled as a screenwriter for Columbia Pictures. As his children grew into American teenagers, he noticed that his daughter Kathy in particular was drawn into a very specific, regional, contemporary slice of American teenaged culture – the surf culture.

Surfing was a then-minor youth movement that built its foundation around a sport, love of the beach, and jargon that must have proved a challenge to an Eastern European immigrant. The details fascinated Kohner, who was empathetic with his daughter's feminist intention to participate in a "boys-only" sport. A book was conceived and Kathy became her father's muse as he delved into the surfing world with his daughter as his guide. Over a six-week period, Kohner wove the stories she told into a novel, which he titled upon completion with her nickname, Gidget.

In the original novel, Gidget gives her name as follows:

"It's Franzie," I said. "From Franziska. It's a German name. After my grandmother."

She does not give us her last name. In subsequent novels, her name is Franzie Hofer. In the films in which she appears, following World War II, her name is changed to a more English-sounding Frances Lawrence, and the names of some other characters are changed, as well. In the 1960s television series (episode 16, "Now There's a Face"), Gidget gives her full name as Frances Elizabeth Lawrence.

Kohner also wrote other novels about the experiences of different teenaged girls, including The Continental Kick, Mister Will You Marry Me?, and The Gremmie, as well as nonfiction books such as the biographies Kiki of Montparnasse and The Magician of Sunset Boulevard.

== Films ==
Sandra Dee as Gidget in the 1959 film (VHS cover)

Kohner sold the movie rights to Columbia Pictures (through the William Morris Agency) for $50,000, then giving five percent of this to his daughter Kathy.

In the late 1950s and early 1960s, the character Gidget (the prototypical beach bunny) was adapted for three films, all directed by Paul Wendkos and released by Columbia Pictures:

- Gidget (1959), starring Sandra Dee (screenplay by Gabrielle Upton)
- Gidget Goes Hawaiian (1961), starring Deborah Walley
- Gidget Goes to Rome (1963), starring Cindy Carol

The first film also featured a young Yvonne Craig and Tom Laughlin, long before Laughlin became known as Billy Jack and Craig as Batgirl and her alter-ego Barbara Gordon in the final season of Batman. The later two films were billed as sequels to the first, and an attempt was made at story continuity despite changes in most of the cast. Only James Darren, playing Gidget's boyfriend Moondoggie, has the same major role in all three films. For Gidget Goes Hawaiian, some scenes from the first film were reshot with the new cast, to be used as flashbacks.

== Television ==
In 1965, the character was adapted for television in the Screen Gems sitcom series Gidget, starring Sally Field. Don Porter, who had played Gidget's father in Gidget Goes to Rome, reprised the role for the show. The series reintroduced Larue, a timid, awkward girl who often accompanied Gidget on her zany escapades, and an older married sister Anne Cooper (Ann Cooper in the novels), both of whom had appeared in the original 1957 novel, but were absent from the motion pictures.

In 1969, Karen Valentine starred as Gidget in the telemovie Gidget Grows Up, freely adapted from the 1968 novel Gidget Goes New York, but also functioning as a sequel to the 1965 sitcom series.

In 1972, another telemovie was made, titled Gidget Gets Married, in which Gidget finally married longtime boyfriend Moondoggie. Monie Ellis played the title role. This incarnation of Gidget is unique in that it gives Moondoggie's real name as Jeff Stevens. In the novels, the other telemovies and The New Gidget, he is Geoffrey H. Griffin (the middle initial is mentioned only in the first novel); in the Hollywood films and the sitcom Gidget, he is Jeffrey Matthews. Later that year, Hanna-Barbera produced a 60-minute animated feature for television, Gidget Makes the Wrong Connection, with Kathy Gori as the voice of Gidget. It was broadcast as part of the Saturday-morning series The ABC Saturday Superstar Movie.

In 1985, a follow-up of the 1965 sitcom series was launched with the telemovie Gidget's Summer Reunion, starring Caryn Richman as a grown version of the character played by Sally Field. This was followed by a sitcom series The New Gidget, which ran for two seasons, 1986–1988.

== Stage ==
In 2000, Francis Ford Coppola staged a musical adaptation of Gidget with a cast of students from the Orange County High School for the Arts, calling it "sort of a Catcher in the Rye for girls". Coppola wrote the book and cowrote the score with John Farrar, and Krysta Rodriguez played Gidget.

In 2007, Terry McCabe and Marissa McKown adapted a stage play Gidget from Kohner's 1957 novel. It was performed at City Lit Theater in Chicago in May and June 2007, directed by Marissa McKown and starred Sabrina Kramnich as Gidget.

== Gidget timeline ==
- 1941 Kathy Kohner born.
- 1956 Kathy Kohner learns to surf and is nicknamed "Gidget".
- 1957 Gidget, the Little Girl with Big Ideas published.
- 1959 Motion picture Gidget released, Cher Papa published.
- 1961 Motion picture Gidget Goes Hawaiian released, novelization Gidget Goes Hawaiian published.
- 1963 The Affairs of Gidget published, motion picture Gidget Goes to Rome released, novelization Gidget Goes to Rome published.
- 1965 Gidget in Love published, sitcom series Gidget first airs.
- 1966 Gidget Goes Parisienne published, sitcom series Gidget canceled.
- 1968 Gidget Goes New York published.
- 1969 Telemovie Gidget Grows Up airs.
- 1972 Telemovie Gidget Gets Married airs, animated feature Gidget Makes the Wrong Connection airs.
- 1985 Telemovie Gidget's Summer Reunion airs.
- 1986 Frederick Kohner dies, sitcom series The New Gidget airs.
- 1988 Sitcom series The New Gidget canceled.

== See also ==
- 1957 in literature
- 1959 in film
- 1965 in television
- Surfing
- Surf culture

== Notes ==
- , "America's Mermaid" - essay by Deanne Stillman about Kathy Kohner Zuckerman
- "In Malibu, Gidget's Up" (interview with Zuckerman, The Washington Post, September 16, 2005
- "Successful Women" (interview with Zuckerman), Jewish Woman, Summer 2003
- Review of the DVD containing the three Gidget films.
- Synopsis of many telemovies including Gidget Grows Up.
- Gidget (character) at IMDb
