= Gabrielle Upton (screenwriter) =

Canadian-born American screenwriter and actress (1921–2022)

Gabrielle Upton (aka Gillian Houghton) (July 6, 1921 – September 13, 2022) was a Canadian-born American screenwriter and actress, best known for her writing work on the 1959 film Gidget, as well television shows such as The Loretta Young Show, Ben Casey, and The Virginian.

== Life and career ==
Upton was born in Vancouver, British Columbia on July 6, 1921. By 1953, Upton had turned from acting to screenwriting, a move that spawned more offers of work for her in television, film and radio. During the 1950s, Upton worked in the United Kingdom, writing scripts for the anthology series Douglas Fairbanks Presents. Her husband was actor turned sound man Julian Upton, who was also born in Vancouver. He predeceased her in 2016, aged 94. She died in Santa Rosa, California on September 13, 2022, at the age of 101.
