= Gidget Goes to Rome =

1963 film by Paul Wendkos

- 1963 theatrical poster
- Directed by: Paul Wendkos
- Written by: Ruth Brooks Flippen; Katherine Albert; Dale Eunson
- Produced by: Jerry Bresler
- Starring: Cindy Carol; James Darren
- Cinematography: Enzo Barboni; Robert Bronner
- Edited by: William A. Lyon
- Music by: John Williams
- Production company: Columbia Pictures
- Distributed by: Columbia Pictures
- Release date: July 31, 1963 (Pittsburgh)
- Running time: 104 minutes
- Country: United States
- Language: English
- Box office: $2,000,000 (US/ Canada rentals)

Gidget Goes to Rome is a 1963 American romantic comedy film produced by Columbia Pictures in Eastmancolor starring Cindy Carol as the archetypal high school teen surfer girl originally portrayed by Sandra Dee in the 1959 film Gidget. The film is the third of three Gidget films directed by Paul Wendkos and expands upon Gidget's romance with boyfriend Moondoggie. The screenplay was written by Ruth Brooks Flippen based on characters created by Frederick Kohner. Veterans of previous Gidget films making appearances include James Darren as "Moondoggie", Joby Baker, and Jean "Jeff" Donnell as Gidget's mom, Mrs. Lawrence.

== Plot ==
College-bound Gidget (Cindy Carol) is vacationing in Rome for the summer with faithful boyfriend Jeff, aka Moondoggie (James Darren) and their friends. Chaperoning the pair is Aunt Albertina (Jessie Royce Landis). However, Gidget's father Russell, worried about his daughter being abroad, asks an old friend of his, named Paolo Cellini, to keep an eye on Gidget to see that she stays out of trouble. Complications set in when Gidget begins to fall for the much older Paolo.

== Cast ==
- Cindy Carol as Gidget (Frances Lawrence)
- Don Porter as Russell Lawrence, her father
- Jean "Jeff" Donnell as Mrs. Lawrence, her mother
- James Darren as Moondoggie (Jeffrey Matthews)
- Jessie Royce Landis as Albertina Blythe
- Cesare Danova as Paolo Cellini
- Danielle De Metz as Daniela
- Joby Baker as Judge
- Trudi Ames as Libby Bennet
- Noreen Corcoran as Lucy McDougall
- Peter Brooks as Clay Anderson
- Lisa Gastoni as Signora Cellini
- Claudio Gora as Alberto

== Production notes ==
The film was shot on location in Rome, Italy, with some scenes filmed on Italian beaches. In a parody of La Dolce Vita, Gidget attends a high society party and goes into the Trevi Fountain.

With Deborah Walley pregnant at the time of filming, Cindy Carol, who had previously acted under the name Carol Sydes, took over the Gidget role and was signed to a Columbia Pictures contract.

== Reception ==
Bosley Crowther noted in the New York Times of 12 September 1963:

When Gidget, played with the proper pout and correct ingenuousness by Cindy Caroll [sic], arrives in Rome with her group of happy friends, she is bound to fall in love with a married and handsome Italian magazine writer, enjoy such exotic delicacies as fettucini and chicken cacciatore, and experience the thrill of attending a 'Dolce Vita' cocktail party. As one of Gidget's friends explains, it's part of her 'growing up.' Gidget falls out of love in time...and all ends happily. Jeff sums up the entire experience in two immortal sentences: 'I guess everybody falls in love in Rome in the summer time. It's that old devil Italian moon.'"

Filmink argued "James Darren seems bored and resentful and the film is depressing with Moondoggie and Gidget winding up together because they can’t get anyone else."

== See also ==
- List of American films of 1963
