= Gidget (film) =

1959 American comedy film by Paul Wendkos

- 1959 theatrical poster
- Directed by: Paul Wendkos
- Screenplay by: Gabrielle Upton
- Based on: Gidget; 1957 novel by Frederick Kohner
- Produced by: Lewis J. Rachmil
- Starring: Sandra Dee; Cliff Robertson; James Darren; Arthur O'Connell; The Four Preps
- Cinematography: Burnett Guffey
- Edited by: William A. Lyon
- Music by: Arthur Morton
- Color process: ColumbiaColor
- Production company: Columbia Pictures
- Distributed by: Columbia Pictures
- Release date: March 25, 1959
- Running time: 95 minutes
- Country: United States
- Language: English
- Box office: $1.5 million (est. US /Canada rentals)

Gidget is a 1959 American CinemaScope comedy film directed by Paul Wendkos and starring Sandra Dee, Cliff Robertson, James Darren, Arthur O'Connell, and the Four Preps.

The film is about a teenager's initiation into the California surf culture and her romance with a young surfer.

The film was the first of many screen appearances by the character Gidget, created by Hollywood writer Frederick Kohner (based on his daughter Kathy). The screenplay was written by Gillian Houghton, who was then head writer of the soap opera The Secret Storm, using the pen name Gabrielle Upton. This would be Upton's sole contribution to the Gidget canon. The story was based on Kohner's 1957 novel Gidget, the Little Girl with Big Ideas.

The film, which received one award nomination, not only inspired various sequel films, a television series, and television films, but is also considered the beginning of the entire "beach party film" genre. Gidget is credited by numerous sources (Stoked! A History of Surf Culture by Drew Kampion; The Encyclopedia of Surfing by Matt Warshaw; and Riding Giants, a documentary film by Stacy Peralta—to name just three) as the single biggest factor in the mainstreaming of surfing culture in the United States.

== Plot ==
Francine Lawrence, a teenager going on 17, enjoys the summer break before her senior year. She detests man-hunting with her girlfriends, but how else can she socialize? During one such visit to the beach with her "well-developed" girlfriends, flat-chested tomboy Francine meets surfer Moondoggie. She quickly becomes infatuated, but he shows no interest. Thus early on, Francine becomes more attracted to surfing than man-hunting. At home, Francine's parents advance her $21.50 for a used surfboard. She returns to the beach to surf, and the all-male surfing crowd adopt her as a mascot. They dub her "Gidget", a combination of "girl" and "midget".

The surfer gang is led by the worldly beach bum, The Big Kahuna. He is a thirty-something veteran Korean War jet pilot who has dropped out of society. He travels the globe surfing, with a pet bird, Flyboy, as his only companion. Moondoggie, son of a successful businessman, idolizes Kahuna; he wishes to emulate his hero's surf-bum lifestyle, instead of obeying the wishes of his father that he attend university. Kahuna and Gidget enjoy each other's company, but she questions how he can survive an aimless, lonely existence. Kahuna later reflects on Gidget's doubts after the tragic death of Flyboy.

One evening, hoping to make Moondoggie jealous, Gidget hires another surfer to be her date at a big luau. But her plan backfires, and she winds up with Moondoggie anyway. The date goes better than expected, and Moondoggie begins to see her as more than a mascot. Yet still hoping to make him jealous, Gidget tells him she's really after Kahuna. Moondoggie reacts badly, and Gidget flees the luau. On the road, she spots Kahuna and agrees to drive him to a nearby beach house. Alone, Gidget asks Kahuna to take her virginity. At first amused, Kahuna goes along, but finds himself falling for her straightforward innocence. Angry with himself for what almost happened, Kahuna throws her out just as Moondoggie arrives. Gidget is mortified but escapes the house undetected. Moondoggie and Kahuna then fight over Gidget. The cops are summoned and the fight is broken up.

Afterwards, Gidget is stranded with a flat tire and without her driver's license. A police car happens by, and she is escorted to the local police station, where her parents are reporting her missing. Consequently, Gidget's father orders her out of the surfing scene. Later, he sets her up on a blind date with Jeffrey Matthews, the son of a business associate. She grudgingly accepts. To her surprise, Matthews turns out to be Moondoggie. The two return to the beach to find Kahuna tearing down his shack. They further discover he has taken a job as an airline pilot. Moondoggie and Gidget realize their affection for each other and, as an act of romantic devotion, Moondoggie asks Gidget to wear his class pin. Before leaving, Kahuna cheerfully warns Moondoggie that Gidget might be small but she's quite a woman.

== Cast ==
- Sandra Dee as Francine "Gidget" Lawrence
- Cliff Robertson as Burt "The Big Kahuna" Vail
- James Darren as Jeffrey "Moondoggie" Matthews
- Arthur O'Connell as Russell Lawrence
- The Four Preps as Band at Beach
- Mary LaRoche as Dorothy Lawrence
- Joby Baker as Stinky
- Tom Laughlin as Lover Boy
- Sue George as Betty "B. L." Louise
- Robert Ellis as Hot Shot
- Jo Morrow as Mary Lou
- Yvonne Craig as Nan
- Patti Kane as Patti
- Doug McClure as Waikiki
- Burt Metcalfe as Lord Byron

Cast notes:

- The studio wanted Elvis Presley to play the role of Moondoggie, but he was in the United States Army at the time.
- Malibu surfers Miki Dora and Mickey Munoz appear in the surfing scenes.

== Production ==
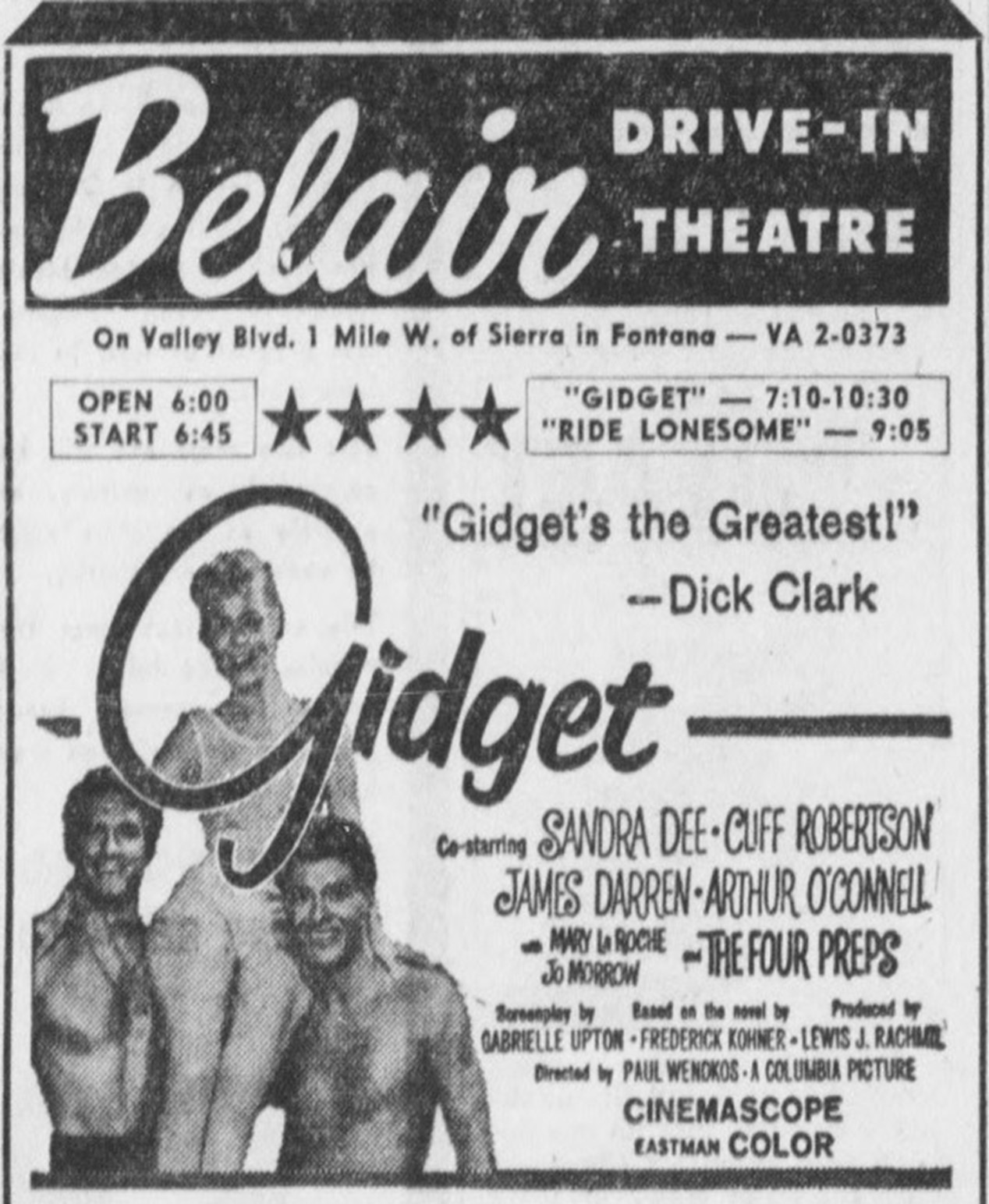
Drive-in advertisement from 1959

The film was shot in just 26 days during June–July 1958 at Leo Carrillo State Park and Columbia Pictures Studios. Sandra Dee originally was going to film the sequel Gidget Goes Hawaiian but didn't. Rose Marie Reid designed all of the women's swimsuits in the film.

== Reception ==
On the review aggregator website Rotten Tomatoes, 55% of 11 critics' reviews are positive, with an average rating of 5.8/10.

=== Contemporary domestic reviews ===
Variety called it "a class teenage comedy".

Howard Thompson wrote in the New York Times of April 23, 1959, "[The film] is enough to make anybody leave one of the neighborhood theatres, where it opened yesterday, and light out for Long Island Sound. Pictorially, this mild little Columbia frolic, about a teen-age girl with boy trouble, seems an ideal way to usher in the beach season." He praised performers Dee, Robertson, and La Roche. A self-proclaimed "Screen Scout" for the San Francisco Examiner wrote that "the studio should have released it for the birds. Even Sandra Dee, cute as she is, couldn't save this one." Margaret Harford of the Los Angeles Mirror wrote that "Gabrielle Upton's screenplay forestalls censorship troubles. In her well-written script, overheated romance boils down to a wholesome and virtuous little frolic on the beach. And a crew of attractive young performers keeps things lively with seldom a dull moment." Harold Whitehead of the Montreal Gazette said that "this is a pretty aimless little item about surf-board acrobats and their peculiar views on life, but it is saved from complete lack of point by a charming performance from Sandra Dee, a pert little blonde teen-ager who is making a name for herself in the movies these days." A critic using the G.H.A. in the Montreal Star called it "a pleasant little comedy-romance [...] in which the teenagers are depicted as healthy and attractive young people— none of them are suffering from frustration or neurosis, none of them are juvenile delinquents. and none of them an psychopathic cases." A critic for the New York Daily News remarked that "adolescense is so seldom lensed without distortion that "Gidget" is a welcome sight for eyes sorely tired of the delinquency angle. Treated with neither acid nor saccharine, the film achieves a reasonably good facsimile of the aging teens. Even better, perhaps, is the 'flair for comedy in both dialogue and situation." Marjory Adams of The Boston Globe remarked called the film "sparking and very youthful entertainment, designed to appeal to those under 25, but the intelligence of the adult theatregoer won't be insulted." Myles Standish opened his review in the St. Louis Post-Dispatch by writing:

HEY, GANG! Just saw the snappiest teen-age picture! Sandra Dee, who’s really a baby though she’s getting a makeup as hardboiled as an old silent vamp, goes to Malibu Beach—that’s in Hawaii—on her vacation and mixes up with some icky boys who have nothing to do but show their muscles, suntan, ride surfboards, and make lazy passes at Sandra, which is all she rates. It’s called “Gidget,” and is at the Fox.

Helen Bower of the Detroit Free Press called the film "summer sea-sand-and-sun fun" and noted that "older people can enjoy watching the bright, happy young ones idling away the hours on the Pacific ocean beach at Mali-bu, where much of the movie is set. They'll see some quite exciting surfboard riding, too, in the sport imported from our 50th state." Mildred Martin of The Philadelphia Inquirer wrote that "the film is spiked with a song or two, spends endless Eastman Colored CinemaScope footage on "riding the curl" and other aspects of surfboarding and fairly crawls with energetic, carefree youth in all types of bathing costumes." R.H. Gardner of The Baltimore Sun wrote that "it would be ironic if in the rubble of our present civilization, future generations unearthed a print of "Gidget," for, after seeing it, they'd never understand the kind of people we were. The film, now at the Stanley, is in my experience unique. Its characters—answering to the names of Moondoggie, Kahoona, Lover Boy, B. L., Hot Shot, Waikiki, Lord Byron, etc.—look like human beings instead of shaggy dogs, cartoon creations or science-fiction monsters, but their behavior brands them as products of a culture with which I am totally unfamiliar." Kaspar Monahan of The Pittsburgh Press wrote that "although Gidget was obviously designed to appeal to the younger set, there's no law against an oldster viewing it and even enjoying it. In fact, I found the new arrival at the Harris a most refreshing and original slant on the troubles and problems besetting a young maiden on the threshold of womanhood." Leonard Mendlowitz of the Pittsburgh Sun-Telegraph wrote that "there are no weighty problems or significant messages in this light and bright musical, might well have been called 'How Frannie Got her Fraternity Pin.'"

=== Contemporary international reviews ===
The film received generally negative reviews in other continents. Campbell Dixon stated, in The Daily Telegraph that Swedish director Ingmar Bergman's Journey Into Autumn, "which will corrupt nobody's morals, has an 'X' certificate. Gidget, a moronic story for teenagers about a girl suffering from sex in the head, is 'U', presumably because she is only 16 and, if she does succeed in getting herself seduced after long and patient effort, it will be all in girlish fun. Am I alone in finding these values a little odd?" John Waterman of the Evening Standard described Sandra Dee as "acting valiantly and with a background of brilliantly photographed surf-riding." Margaret Winxman of the Daily Herald said that "when it comes to chilling the spine, you can keep your electro-plated invaders from outer space, mangled marrows from the interior of the earth and finned things from the bottom of the sea. For me the most terrifying Monster of the lot is the all-American teenager—at least, as currently portrayed in Gidget. It isn't the noise they make—which is deafening. It isn't the lingo, they speak-which is untranslatable: It isn't even the capers they cut—which are maddening. It's their devilish disregard for anybody else's feelings, comfort or dignity which is so appalling. (Parents, of course, being strictly from 'squaresville,' are quite expendable.) And these, mark you. are supposed to be nice teenagers." Dick Richards of the Daily Mirror called the film "a frail little piece [that] will make anybody over the age of twenty-one feel very old and jaded." An unnamed critic for Australia's Sun-Herald newspaper called it an "unevenly coloured but passably pleasant and quite innocuous film." Colin Bennett of The Age called it "a picture that might be roughly described as a tusical, or teen-agers' musical." He added:

Columbia's wardrobe department supplies Sandra Dee, the squeaking blonde in the title role, with 19 cute changes of bathing suit. Columbia's orchestra supplies three hit songs, all of which sounded awful to me. And Gidget's Mom supplies the sentiment: Gidget will know when true love comes along because she'll hear "little bells ringing in her heart." By the end of summer, the bells have pealed and Gidget is wearing her fraternity pin which should keep her happy until next year, when, no doubt, we will be subjected to The Return of Gidget.

=== Retrospective reviews ===
Craig Butler in Allmovie notes, "Although the very title prompts snorts of derision from many, Gidget is actually not a bad little teenaged flick from the '50s. Great art it definitely isn't, but as frivolous, lighthearted entertainment, it more than fits the bill. Those who know it only by reputation will probably be surprised to find that it does attempt to deal with the problems of life as seen by a teenager—and that, while some of those attempts are silly, many of them come off quite well. It also paints a very convincing picture of the beach-bum lifestyle, much more so than the Frankie Avalon–Annette Funicello beach party movies."

Filmink argued Cliff "Robertson’s role in Gidget’s success was under-rated – he added an extra level of gravitas not present in the sequels or indeed in most beach movies."

== Awards and nominations ==
The film received a 1960 Golden Laurel Award nomination for Top Female Comedy Performance for actress Sandra Dee.

== See also ==
- List of American films of 1959
