= Harry Ackerman =

American television producer (1912–1991)

- Born: Harry Stephen Ackerman; November 17, 1912; Albany, New York, U.S.
- Died: February 3, 1991 (aged 78); Burbank, California, U.S.
- Resting place: Forest Lawn Memorial Park, Los Angeles, California, U.S.
- Occupations: Television producer; writer
- Spouses: Mary Leone Dennis (Shipp) (m. 1939, divorced) Elinor Donahue (m. 1962)

Harry Stephen Ackerman (November 17, 1912 – February 3, 1991) was an American television producer, credited with creating or co-creating twenty-one series, seven of which were at one time being broadcast simultaneously. Some of the sitcoms in which he was involved in production during the 1950s and 1960s are also among the most popular American shows in the early history of television, such as Father Knows Best, Dennis the Menace, Leave It to Beaver, The Farmer's Daughter, Hazel, Bewitched, The Flying Nun, and Gidget.

Ackerman was known in the entertainment industry as the “dean of television comedy”, although he was also instrumental in developing many dramatic classics and documentaries, such as The Caine Mutiny Court-Martial, The Day Lincoln Was Shot, and The 20th Century.

== Early life and education ==
Harry Ackerman was born in Albany, New York, on November 17, 1912. His father was French-Indian Mohawk, and his mother was Irish. He graduated from Dartmouth College in 1935 as a theater arts major.

== Career ==
Ackerman began his career as a writer, but soon became a radio performer, appearing as the comic poet Wilbur W. Willoughby Jr. For a year after his college graduation he worked as a freelancer in radio and films. In 1936 or 1938, he went to work as an advertising executive at Young & Rubicam. In 1946, he became vice president of program operations. He left that agency to begin working at CBS on January 1, 1948.

Ackerman began his career in television at CBS, where he started as an executive producer in New York for the network. Later he became vice president in charge of CBS programs in Hollywood, California. While at CBS he helped create, develop, oversee, and/or approve the casting of Gunsmoke, I Love Lucy, The Jack Benny Show, Burns and Allen, Amos 'n' Andy, Our Miss Brooks, and many other shows. Ackerman was CBS-TV west coast program vice president from 1948 to 1958.

He began his own production company, Harry Ackerman Productions, where he immediately signed an exclusive deal with Paramount TV to create TV series, specials and feature films on a co-production basis, in 1973. He also went to work on network development for Hanna-Barbera Productions. He then joined Screen Gems, which later became Columbia Pictures Television, where he worked for 15 years, from 1958 until 1973. He worked on many TV shows while there, including, Father Knows Best, Bachelor Father (for Universal), Leave It to Beaver (for Universal), Dennis the Menace, The Donna Reed Show, Hazel, Grindl, Gidget, Bewitched, I Dream of Jeannie, The Flying Nun, The Monkees, and The Partridge Family.

In the late 1940s, before coming to Hollywood, he was involved in the beginnings of the Suspense and Westinghouse Studio One dramatic radio anthologies.

== Honors ==
Ackerman won two Emmy Awards for his work and was the first producer ever honored by the Pacific Pioneer Broadcasters at that organization's 1974 luncheon. He was also the national president of the Academy of Television Arts & Sciences for two terms; and in recognition of his many contributions to the entertainment industry during his career, a star dedicated to him was installed in 1985 on the Hollywood Walk of Fame at 6661 Hollywood Boulevard.

== Personal life and legacy ==
Ackerman married actress Mary Shipp in Los Angeles on August 16, 1939. They had a daughter and a son. His second marriage, to actress Elinor Donahue, who was 25 years younger, was in 1962 at the Court of Liberty. He was the adoptive father of her son from her first marriage (to Richard Smith), and he and Donahue had three sons together.

In 1991, Ackerman died of pulmonary failure at age 78 at St. Joseph Medical Center in Burbank, California. He is buried in the Garden of Heritage at Forest Lawn Memorial Park in Hollywood Hills.

Ackerman was an alumnus of Dartmouth, class of 1935. As a memorial to her husband and a resource for American television history, Elinor Donahue donated Ackerman's personal papers to Rauner Library at Dartmouth College in 1994.
