= Frederick Kohner =

Austrian-American novelist and screenwriter

- Born: Friedrich Kohner; September 25, 1905; Teplice-Šanov, Bohemia, Austria-Hungary
- Died: July 7, 1986 (aged 80); Los Angeles, California, U.S.
- Occupations: Novelist, screenwriter
- Children: Kathy Kohner-Zuckerman
- Relatives: Paul Kohner (brother); Lupita Tovar (sister-in-law)

Friedrich Kohner (September 25, 1905 – July 7, 1986), credited professionally as Frederick Kohner, was an Austrian-born novelist and screenwriter, both in Germany and the U.S.

He is best known for having created the "Gidget" novels, which inspired a series of movies, two television series, three telemovies and a feature-length animated film. He based the title character on his daughter, Kathy Kohner-Zuckerman.

== Life ==
Kohner was born on September 25, 1905, in Teplice-Šanov, Bohemia, Austria-Hungary. After studying in Vienna and Paris, Kohner wrote his thesis, "Film ist Dichtung" ("Film is Poetry"). Subsequently, he worked as a journalist in Prague and Berlin. During 1929/1930 he was employed as a movie correspondent for German newspapers in Hollywood. While there, he took a minor role in Lewis Milestone's 1930 anti-war film All Quiet on the Western Front.

Returning to Berlin in 1930, Kohner began to work for the German film industry, starting with the comedy Seitensprünge - a young Billy Wilder was also a screenwriter on the project - where Kohner was assistant producer to István Székély. In 1932/33 Kohner wrote or co-wrote three screenplays for his brother, Universal Studios producer Paul Kohner. As a Jew, he was increasingly isolated within the industry by the worsening political climate in Germany. In 1934, director Robert Siodmak, who had fled to Paris after completing Brennendes Geheimnis, made it possible for Kohner to contribute to the screenplay for La crise est finie. During the Nazi era, Kohner was not credited for his contributions to the screenplay Viktoria, an adaption of a novel by Knut Hamsun. In July 1936, Kohner, his wife Fritzi and their four-year-old daughter Ruth, emigrated to the U.S..

From the time he established himself in Hollywood (mostly uncredited work for developing screenplays and treatments), he went by the Americanized name of Frederick Kohner. For his contribution to the 1938 Deanna Durbin comedy Mad About Music, Kohner received an Academy Award nomination.

From 1939 onward, he worked only sporadically writing screenplays; among them was The Men in Her Life with Loretta Young and Conrad Veidt. The bulk of his work in the U.S. concentrated on developing stories for other screenwriters.

Kohner died on July 7, 1986, in Los Angeles, California, aged 80.

== Selected filmography ==
- The Burning Secret (1933)
- The Crisis is Over (1934)
- Victoria (1935)
- Tahiti Honey (1943)
- Lake Placid Serenade (1944)
- Love, Dance and a Thousand Songs (1955)
