= Chris Weitz =

American filmmaker (born 1969)

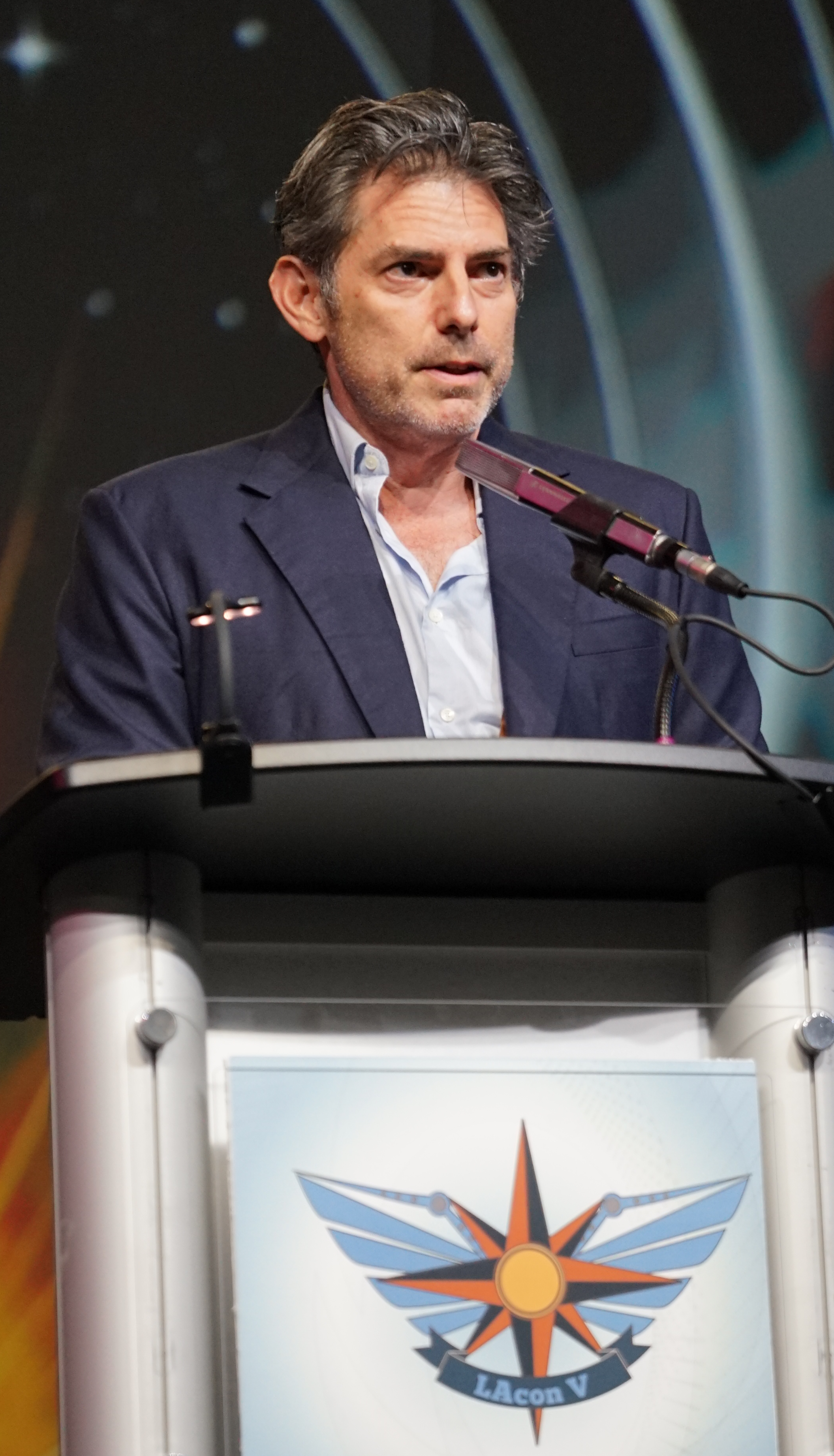
- Weitz receiving 2026 Hugo Award
- Born: Christopher John Weitz; November 30, 1969 (age 56); New York City, U.S.
- Education: Trinity College, Cambridge University
- Occupations: Filmmaker; actor
- Years active: 1998–present
- Notable work: Chuck & Buck; American Pie; About a Boy; The Golden Compass; The Twilight Saga: New Moon
- Spouse: Mercedes Martinez (m. 2006)
- Children: 3
- Parents: John Weitz (father); Susan Kohner (mother)
- Relatives: Paul Weitz (brother); Lupita Tovar (grandmother); Paul Kohner (grandfather)

Christopher John Weitz (/waɪts/; born November 30, 1969) is an American filmmaker and actor. He is best known for his work with his brother Paul on the comedy films American Pie and About a Boy; the latter earned the Weitz brothers a nomination for the Academy Award for Best Adapted Screenplay. Among his other main works, Weitz was one of the lead actors in the Miguel Arteta-directed film Chuck & Buck, directed the film adaptation of the novel The Golden Compass and the film adaptation of New Moon from the Twilight book series, wrote the screenplay for Disney's 2015 live-action adaptation of Cinderella, and co-wrote Rogue One with Tony Gilroy and Antz with Todd Alcott and Paul.

== Early life ==
Weitz was born in New York City, the son of actress Susan Kohner and Berlin-born novelist/menswear designer John Weitz. His brother is filmmaker Paul Weitz. Weitz is the grandson of Czech-born agent and producer Paul Kohner and actress Lupita Tovar on his maternal side. Tovar, who was from Oaxaca, Mexico, starred in Santa, Mexico's first talkie, in 1932, as well as a Spanish language version of Drácula. Weitz's paternal grandparents escaped Nazi Germany, before which his grandfather was a successful textile manufacturer, with the family being intimates of writer Christopher Isherwood and actress Marlene Dietrich.

Weitz's father and maternal grandfather were Jewish, whereas his maternal grandmother was Catholic; he was raised in a nonreligious household. He has also described himself as a "lapsed Catholic crypto-Buddhist."

As a young boy, Weitz attended Allen-Stevenson School with his brother and was a member of the Knickerbocker Greys, a long-standing New York City youth marching corps that has been in existence since 1881.

When he was 14 years old, Weitz went to the boarding school St Paul's School in London, which his father had attended. He graduated with a degree in English from Trinity College, Cambridge.

== Career ==
=== Early career (1998–2006) ===
Weitz's early career involved many collaborations with his brother. Some of the work they have done as screenwriters has been both credited and uncredited.

Weitz began his film career as a co-writer on the animated film Antz (1998). He followed this with work on various sitcoms such as Off Centre and the 1998 revival of the 1977 TV series Fantasy Island. In 1999, he and Paul directed and produced American Pie, which was written by Adam Herz, and became a major box office success. Weitz returned as executive producer on the film's two theatrical sequels. In 2001, along with his brother, he co-directed his second film, the Chris Rock comedy Down to Earth.

In 2002, the Weitz brothers co-wrote and co-directed About a Boy, the Hugh Grant film based on the book by Nick Hornby. The film was originally set up at New Line Cinema with Robert De Niro producing, and the main character as an American. The brothers felt that it was important that the character is British. Inspiration came from the 1960 film The Apartment. They were nominated for an Academy Award for Best Adapted Screenplay.

Weitz has produced a number of films including In Good Company and American Dreamz, both of which were directed by his brother, Paul.

=== The Golden Compass (2007) ===
In 2003, Weitz was hired to direct New Line Cinema's adaptation of the first book in Philip Pullman's His Dark Materials series, The Golden Compass, after approaching the studio with an unsolicited 40-page treatment. He was subsequently invited by director Peter Jackson to visit the set of King Kong, in order to gain insight into directing a big-budget film and advice on how to deal with New Line. In 2005, Weitz announced his departure from the film, citing the enormous technical challenges involved, and the fear of being denounced by both the book's fans and detractors; he was subsequently replaced by British director Anand Tucker. Tucker left the project in 2006 over creative differences with New Line, and Weitz returned to the director's chair after receiving a letter from Pullman asking him to reconsider.

During post-production, New Line had Weitz's editor replaced, and the studio made the final cut with severe differences from Weitz's vision, trimming the originally unhappy ending and watering down the religious theme. Weitz stated:

It was a terrible experience because I was able to shoot what I wanted to — and then the cut of the movie was taken away from me and any reference to religion or religious ideas was removed. And the darkness and threat at the end of the story — anything that made it not a happy, popcorn-type movie — was removed. The voice of the key character was redone, all of this against my will. And the fact of the matter is the people that the studio was afraid were going to raise up arms against the movie did it anyway.

The film was released in 2007 and was met with mixed reviews. Its U.S. grosses have been described as disappointing in relation to film's US$180 million budget, although it was a "stellar performer" outside the U.S. with a "stunning" box office likely to hit $250 million. When questioned about a possible sequel, New Line studio co-head Michael Lynne said that "The jury is still very much out on the movie..." The second and third screenplays have been written but because of the economic recession and the protest by the Catholic Church, the two sequels never got made and was later rebooted into a television series that was released in 2019. Its worldwide box office gross stands at $372,234,864.

=== The Twilight Saga: New Moon (2009) ===
In December 2008, Weitz was announced as the director of the sequel to Twilight, the film adaptation of the novel New Moon by Stephenie Meyer. Weitz said he felt a tremendous sense of responsibility to live up to the expectations of the passionate fan base.

The Twilight Saga: New Moon opened in November 2009, one year after the first movie was released. New Moon set records as the biggest midnight opening in domestic box office history, grossing an estimated $26.3 million in 3,514 theaters, previously held by Harry Potter and the Half-Blood Prince. The film grossed $72.7 million on its opening day domestically, becoming the biggest single-day opening in domestic history, beating the $67.2 million tally of The Dark Knight. This opening strongly contributed to another record: the first time that the top ten films at the domestic box office had a combined gross of over $100 million in a single day.

The opening weekend of New Moon was the third-highest opening weekend in US domestic history with $142,839,137, and the sixth-highest worldwide opening weekend with $274.9 million total. With an estimated budget of just under $50 million, New Moon is the least expensive movie to ever open to more than $200 million worldwide. Over Thanksgiving weekend, the film grossed $42.5 million, and including Wednesday and Thursday ticket sales it grossed $66 million. It earned $230.7 million in its first ten days, $38 million more than the previous installment grossed in its entire theatrical run. Internationally, the film grossed roughly $85 million over Thanksgiving weekend, adding up to a total worldwide gross of $473.7 million in ten days. Weitz decided not to continue to direct the next film in the franchise.

=== Other projects ===
In June 2011, Summit Entertainment released Weitz's film A Better Life, written by Eric Eason about a Hispanic gardener and his son in Los Angeles searching for their stolen truck. This film is unusual among Hollywood productions in that it is set in a Hispanic community and features an almost entirely Hispanic cast. Weitz said that working on the film allowed him to explore his Hispanic heritage—his grandmother is from Mexico—and learn Spanish. The film was nominated for an Oscar.

In 2012, he worked with journalist Jose Antonio Vargas on a series of four documentary shorts directed by Weitz called Is This Alabama?, about the effects of the state of Alabama's anti-immigration legislation, 2011's Alabama HB 56. The project was a collaboration between Weitz, Vargas, the Center for American Progress think-tank, America's Voice Education Fund, and Vargas' Define American campaign, with Vargas doing the interviews.

Weitz wrote the screenplay for Disney's 2015 live-action adaptation of Cinderella, which was released in theaters on March 13, 2015. Weitz said he went back to the many different versions of the story (Brothers Grimm, Charles Perrault, as well as the 1950 animated Disney original) as well as his own vision.

Weitz scripted the first Star Wars stand-alone film, director Gareth Edwards' Rogue One (2016). Replacing Gary Whitta, Weitz shared writing duties with Tony Gilroy. In 2017, Weitz and J. Mills Goodloe co-wrote the script for Fox 2000's The Mountain Between Us, a film adaptation of the novel of the same name, by Charles Martin.

Weitz has a production company with his brother Paul Weitz and producer Andrew Miano called Depth of Field. In March 2016, Weitz and his brother signed a two-year first look deal with Amazon Studios. Among the projects they were developing included a live-action adaptation of Michael Moorcock's Elric saga, producing remakes of the Japanese films Shield of Straw, Soul Reviver, Birthright, and Like Father, Like Son, and producing the TV series Sinatoro for Universal Television. Weitz was also set to write the screen adaptation of 21 Years to Midnight, a movie about same-sex marriage documented in the legal case Obergefell v. Hodges.

Weitz directed Operation Finale, a 2018 MGM historical drama thriller film, written by Matthew Orton, about the Mossad and Shin Bet teams that captured Adolf Eichmann. The film starred Oscar Isaac, Ben Kingsley, Lior Raz, Mélanie Laurent, Nick Kroll, and Joe Alwyn.

He directed the Blumhouse horror thriller film Afraid, released on August 30, 2024.

=== Acting ===
Weitz has also occasionally worked as an actor, playing the lead role in the 2000 comedy film Chuck & Buck and a bland suburbanite in Mr. & Mrs. Smith.

=== Author ===
Weitz wrote a young adult novel trilogy series that began with The Young World, in 2014, and was followed by The New Order, in 2015 and The Revival in 2016. The series follows a group of teenagers struggling to survive in a post-apocalyptic world where a disease killed off all adults over the age of 18.

Weitz said that he used the concept of natural intelligence theories called Society of Mind created by Marvin Minsky to create the stories that were loosely autobiographical about growing up in New York City.

== Personal life ==
Weitz is married to Mercedes Martinez, who is Cuban Mexican, and with whom he has one son, Sebastian Weitz and a daughter, Athena Weitz. Weitz said he met Martinez at the Burning Man festival.

In 2004, Weitz was a co-investor with Paul Devitt in the Japanese restaurant and club called Tokio on N. Cahuenga in Los Angeles.

On November 11, 2016, after Donald Trump won the presidential election, Weitz tweeted, "Please note that the Empire is a white supremacist (human) organization." Although he had apologized and deleted the tweet, several Trump supporters have used the hashtag #DumpStarWars and claimed that Rogue One contained an anti-Trump scene.

== Filmography ==
=== Film ===
Year	Title	Director	Writer	Producer	Notes
1998	Antz	No	Yes	No	Co-written with his brother Paul Weitz and Todd Alcott
1999	American Pie	Uncredited	No	Yes	Co-directed with Paul Weitz
2000	Nutty Professor II: The Klumps	No	Yes	No	Co-written with Paul Weitz, Barry W. Blaustein and David Sheffield
2001	Down to Earth	Yes	No	No	Co-directed with Paul Weitz
2002	About a Boy	Yes	Yes	No	Co-directed with Paul Weitz, and co-written with Paul Weitz and Peter Hedges; Nominated – Academy Award for Best Adapted Screenplay; Nominated – BAFTA Award for Best Adapted Screenplay
2007	The Golden Compass	Yes	Yes	No	
2009	The Twilight Saga: New Moon	Yes	No	No	
2011	A Better Life	Yes	No	Yes	
2015	Cinderella	No	Yes	No	
2016	Rogue One: A Star Wars Story	No	Yes	No	Co-written with Tony Gilroy
2017	The Mountain Between Us	No	Yes	No	Co-written with J. Mills Goodloe
2018	Operation Finale	Yes	No	No	
2022	Pinocchio	No	Yes	Yes	Co-written with Robert Zemeckis
2023	Haunted Mansion	No	Uncredited	No	Additional literary material
2023	The Creator	No	Yes	No	Co-written with Gareth Edwards
2024	Afraid	Yes	Yes	Yes	
2025	Snow White	No	Uncredited	No	Additional literary material

Producer only

- In Good Company (2004)
- Bickford Shmeckler's Cool Ideas (2006)
- Nick & Norah's Infinite Playlist (2008)
- A Single Man (2009)
- Good Kids (2016)
- Columbus (2017)
- A Happening of Monumental Proportions (2017)
- Prospect (2018)
- The Farewell (2019)
- Crush (2022)
- About My Father (2023)

Executive producer

- American Pie 2 (2001)
- Dylan's Run (2002) (Documentary)
- American Wedding (2003)
- See This Movie (2004)
- American Dreamz (2006)
- Living with Lew (2007) (Documentary)
- American Reunion (2012)
- Spark: A Burning Man Story (2013) (Documentary)
- Boogeyman Pop (2018)
- If You Were the Last (2023)

Acting roles

Year	Title	Role	Notes
1999	American Pie	Male Voice in Porn Film	Uncredited; Voice role
2000	The Broken Hearts Club: A Romantic Comedy	Director	
2000	Chuck & Buck	Charlie "Chuck" Sitter	
2004	See This Movie	Panel Discussion Moderator	
2005	Mr. & Mrs. Smith	Martin Coleman	
2006	Bickford Shmeckler's Cool Ideas	Sheldon Schmeckler	Voice role

=== Television ===
Year	Title	Director	Writer	Executive Producer	Notes
1998–1999	Fantasy Island	No	Yes	Yes	Story (2 episodes); Teleplay (1 episode)
2000–2001	Off Centre	No	Yes	Yes	Also creator
2004–2006	Cracking Up	Yes	Yes	Yes	Also consultant (11 episodes); Wrote and directed the pilot
2025–present	Murderbot	Yes	Yes	Yes	

Other credits

Year	Title	Role	Notes
2010	Lone Star	Consultant producer	2 episodes
2020	The George Lucas Talk Show	Himself	Episode "The George Lucas Talk Show May the 4th Marathon"

== Works and publications ==
- Weitz, Chris (May 8, 2008). "Lights! Camera! Fiction!". New Statesman. ISSN 1364-7431. OCLC 228044383.
- Weitz, Chris (2014). The Young World. New York: Little, Brown and Company. ISBN 978-0-316-36486-7. OCLC 883368959.
- Weitz, Chris (2015). The New Order. New York: Little, Brown and Company. ISBN 978-0-316-22630-1. OCLC 906817034.
- Weitz, Chris (2016). The Revival. New York: Little, Brown and Company. ISBN 978-0-316-22635-6. OCLC 953822735.
