= The Mountain Between Us =

The Mountain Between Us may refer to:

- The Mountain Between Us (novel), a 2011 romance-disaster novel written by Charles Martin
  - The Mountain Between Us (film), a 2017 film adaptation of the novel, starring Idris Elba and Kate Winslet
- The Mountains Between Us, a 1956 Swiss film
