= Paul Weitz (filmmaker) =

American film director and screenwriter (born 1965)

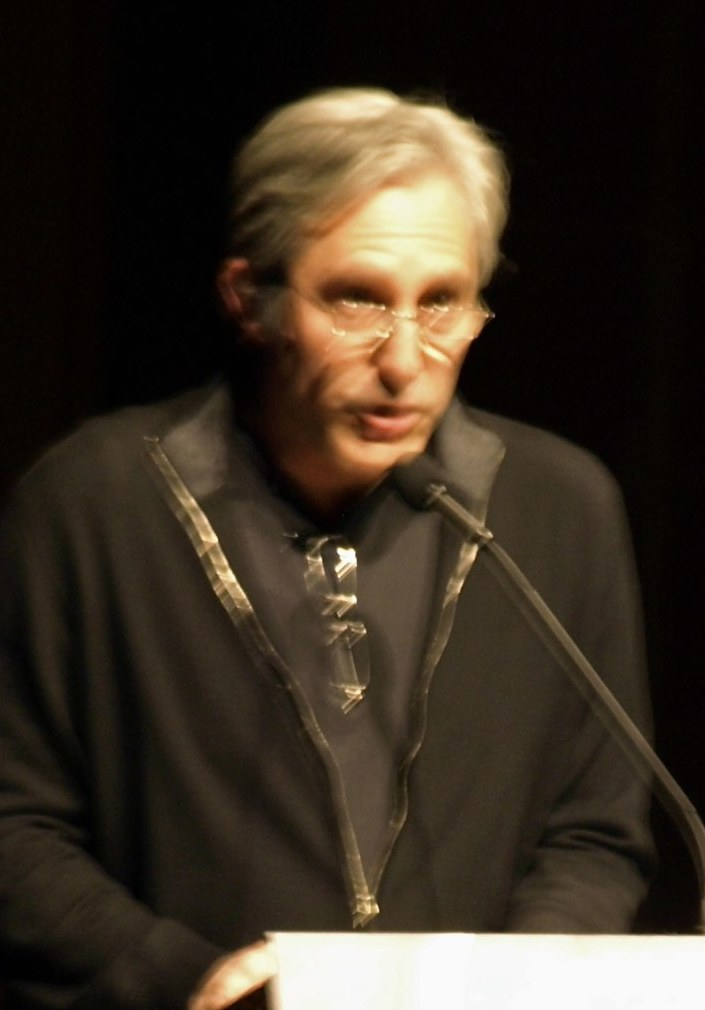
- Weitz in 2015
- Born: Paul John Weitz; November 19, 1965 (age 61); New York City, U.S.
- Education: Wesleyan University
- Occupations: Director; screenwriter; producer; actor; playwright
- Years active: 1998–present
- Notable work: American Pie; About a Boy; Mozart in the Jungle
- Spouse: Patricia Brown (m. 2001)
- Children: 3
- Parents: Susan Kohner; John Weitz
- Relatives: Chris Weitz (brother)

Paul John Weitz (/waɪts/; born November 19, 1965) is an American screenwriter, director and producer. He is the older brother of filmmaker Chris Weitz. Together they worked on the comedy films American Pie and About a Boy; for the latter, they were both nominated for the Academy Award for Best Adapted Screenplay. Weitz is also a writer, executive producer, and director of the Amazon Prime Video dramedy series Mozart in the Jungle.

== Early life ==
Weitz was born in New York City, the son of actress Susan Kohner and Berlin-born novelist/menswear designer John Weitz. His brother is filmmaker Chris Weitz. Weitz is the grandson of Bohemian-born (Austrian-Jewish) agent and producer Paul Kohner and actress Lupita Tovar on his maternal side. Tovar, who was from Oaxaca City, Mexico, starred in Santa, Mexico's first talkie, in 1932, as well as a Mexican version of Drácula. Weitz' paternal grandparents, who were Jewish, escaped Nazi Germany, where his grandfather had been a successful textile manufacturer, and family intimates of Christopher Isherwood and Marlene Dietrich.

Weitz's father and maternal grandfather were Jewish, whereas his maternal grandmother was Catholic. He was raised in a nonreligious household.

Weitz attended the Allen-Stevenson School with his brother and Collegiate. In 1988, he graduated from Wesleyan University. While at Wesleyan, Weitz studied under film instructor Jeanine Basinger.

== Career ==
=== Film ===
Weitz' early career involved many collaborations with his brother. Some of the work they have done as screenwriters has been both credited and uncredited.

Weitz began his film career as a co-writer on the 1998 animated film Antz. He followed this with work on various sitcoms such as Off Centre and the 1998 revival of the 1977 series Fantasy Island. In 1999, he and Chris directed and produced American Pie, which was written by Adam Herz, and became a major box office success. Weitz returned as executive producer on the film's two theatrical sequels.

In 2002, the Weitz brothers co-wrote and co-directed About a Boy, the Hugh Grant film based on the book by Nick Hornby. The film was originally set up at New Line Cinema with Robert De Niro producing, and the main character as an American. The brothers felt that it was important that the character is British. Inspiration came from the film The Apartment (1960). They were nominated for an Academy Award for Best Adapted Screenplay.

Weitz has written and directed the well-received romantic comedy In Good Company and the political satire American Dreamz, which faced mixed reviews. Additional writing credits include the television show Cracking Up.

He has also directed an adaptation of Darren Shan's young adult novel Cirque du Freak called The Vampire's Assistant. He directed the film Little Fockers (2010), the sequel to Meet the Parents and Meet the Fockers.

Subsequently, he wrote and directed Being Flynn, an adaptation of Nick Flynn's memoir Another Bullshit Night in Suck City, starring Robert De Niro. Weitz said he worked collaboratively with Flynn to translate the dense original source material into its film adaptation.

Weitz also directed the movie Admission, starring Tina Fey.

In 2015, Weitz directed the film Grandma, which starred Lily Tomlin. The film premiered at the 2015 Sundance Film Festival on January 30, as the closing night film. The film was Tomlin's first leading role in 27 years, after co-starring with Bette Midler in the comedy film Big Business (1988). It is the second collaboration between Tomlin and Weitz, who previously directed her in his film Admission (2013). The film was released on August 21, 2015, by Sony Pictures Classics. Weitz had the story idea for many years, but it never fully formed until he met and worked with Tomlin on Admission, saying that "After meeting Lily, the voice and the character really clicked, I had thought about it for years, so I had a lot of it worked out in my head, and then I just went to a coffee shop and wrote it longhand." Weitz said the film cost under $600,000 to make. It was well received.

Weitz has a production company with his brother Chris Weitz and producer Andrew Miano called Depth of Field. In March 2016, Weitz and his brother signed a two-year first look deal with Amazon Studios. Among the projects they were developing included a live-action adaptation of Michael Moorcock's Elric saga, producing remakes of the Japanese films Shield of Straw, Soul Reviver, Birthright, and Like Father, Like Son, and producing the TV series Sinatoro for Universal Television.

=== Theatre ===
While in college at Wesleyan, Weitz wrote the play Mango Tea, which was performed Off-Broadway.

Weitz has written a number of plays, including Roulette, Privilege, Show People and Trust, all of which have been produced Off-Broadway in New York City. Trust starred Zach Braff, Bobby Cannavale, Sutton Foster, and Ari Graynor, and was directed by Peter DuBois at Second Stage Theatre. It was to be produced in Brazil, Germany and Greece in 2013. In 2012, Second Stage, which had previously produced Privilege and Show People, produced Lonely, I'm Not, a new comedy by Weitz starring Topher Grace and Olivia Thirlby. Lonely, I'm Not was a New York Times critics pick.

As a writer, Weitz has discussed semi-jokingly the fact that he avoids the discomfort in his life by turning to the act of writing. He sees a good play structure as being very different from a good film structure, and thinks that it is rare for plays as source material to be easily adapted into film.

== Personal life ==
In 2001, Weitz married novelist Patricia Brown, with whom he has three children.

== Filmography ==
=== Films ===
| Year | Title | Director | Writer | Producer | Notes |
|---|---|---|---|---|---|
| 1992 | Ribs | No | Yes | No | Short film |
| 1998 | Antz | No | Yes | No | |
| 1999 | American Pie | Yes | No | Uncredited | Co-director with his brother, Chris Weitz |
| 2000 | Nutty Professor II: The Klumps | No | Yes | No | |
| 2001 | Down to Earth | Yes | No | No | Co-director with his brother, Chris Weitz |
| 2002 | About a Boy | Yes | Yes | No | Co-director with his brother, Chris Weitz; Nominated - Academy Award for Best Adapted Screenplay; Nominated - BAFTA Award for Best Adapted Screenplay |
| 2004 | In Good Company | Yes | Yes | Yes | |
| 2006 | American Dreamz | Yes | Yes | Yes | |
| 2009 | Cirque du Freak: The Vampire's Assistant | Yes | Yes | Yes | |
| 2010 | Little Fockers | Yes | No | No | |
| 2012 | Being Flynn | Yes | Yes | Yes | |
| 2013 | Admission | Yes | No | Yes | |
| 2015 | Grandma | Yes | Yes | Yes | |
| 2018 | Bel Canto | Yes | Yes | Yes | |
| 2021 | Fatherhood | Yes | Yes | Yes | |
| 2022 | Moving On | Yes | Yes | Yes | |
| TBA | In Love | Yes | Yes | Yes | |

Executive producer

- American Pie 2 (2001)
- Dylan's Run (2002) (Documentary)
- American Wedding (2003)
- See This Movie (2004)
- The Golden Compass (2007)
- American Reunion (2012)
- Pinocchio (2022)
- If You Were the Last (2023)

Producer only

- Bickford Shmeckler's Cool Ideas (2006)
- Nick and Norah's Infinite Playlist (2008)
- Good Kids (2016)
- A Happening of Monumental Proportions (2017)
- Crush (2022)
- About My Father (2023)

Acting roles

| Year | Title | Role |
|---|---|---|
| 2000 | Chuck & Buck | Sam |
| 2000 | The Broken Hearts Club: A Romantic Comedy | Assistant Director |
| 2004 | See This Movie | Filmmaker Who Isn't Wim Wenders |
| 2014 | Life After Beth | Mr. Levin |
| 2016 | Joshy | Private Investigator |
| 2017 | The Little Hours | Lucro |

=== Television ===
| Year | Title | Director | Writer | Executive producer | Notes |
|---|---|---|---|---|---|
| 1998–1999 | Fantasy Island | No | Yes | Yes | 3 episodes |
| 2000–2001 | Off Centre | No | Yes | Yes | Also creator |
| 2004–2006 | Cracking Up | Yes | No | Yes | Pilot episode; also consultant (2 episodes) |
| 2010 | Lone Star | No | No | Yes | 2 episodes |
| 2014–2018 | Mozart in the Jungle | Yes | Yes | Yes | Also developer |
| 2025–present | Murderbot | Yes | Yes | Yes | |

== Works and publications ==
- Weitz, Paul. All for One: A Play in Two Acts. New York: Samuel French, 1995. ISBN 978-0-573-69545-2 OCLC 32923519
  - Ensemble Studio Theatre in New York City, opened December 2, 1993. With John Speredakos, Calista Flockhart, Liev Schreiber, Michael Louis Wells, Noelle Parker
- Weitz, Paul. Roulette. New York: Dramatists Play Service, Inc, 2004. ISBN 978-0-822-22008-4 OCLC 60386757
  - Ensemble Studio Theatre at John Houseman Theatre in New York City, opened February 18, 2004. With Larry Bryggman, Ana Gasteyer, Shawn Hatosy, Leslie Lyles, Anna Paquin, Mark Setlock, Grant Shaud
- Weitz, Paul. Privilege. New York: Dramatists Play Service, Inc, 2006. ISBN 978-0-822-22092-3 OCLC 71742937
  - Second Stage Theatre in New York City, opened April 25, 2005. With Harry Zittel, Conor Donovan, Carolyn McCormick, Florencia Lozano, Bob Saget
  - 2006: Nominated for Lucille Lortel Award - Conor Donovan, Outstanding Lead Actor
  - 2005: Won the Theatre World Award - Conor Donovan
- Weitz, Paul. Show People. New York: Dramatists Play Service, 2007. ISBN 978-0-822-22182-1 OCLC 173092429
  - Second Stage Theatre in New York City, opened April 6, 2006. With Ty Burrell, Judy Greer, Debra Monk, Lawrence Pressman
- Weitz, Paul. Trust. New York: Dramatists Play Service, 2011. ISBN 978-0-822-22496-9 OCLC 757469382
  - Second Stage Theatre in New York City, opened August 12, 2010. With Zach Braff, Sutton Foster, Ari Graynor, Bobby Cannavale
  - 2011: Won, Artios Award - Best New York Theatre, Comedy/Musical (Mele Nagler)
- Weitz, Paul. Lonely, I'm Not. New York: Dramatists Play Service, 2013. ISBN 978-0-822-22734-2 OCLC 854889961
  - Second Stage Theatre in New York City, opened May 7, 2012. With Mark Blum, Lisa Emery, Topher Grace, Christopher Jackson, Maureen Sebastian, Olivia Thirlby
  - 2012: Nominated for Henry Hewes Design Award - Mark Wendland for Scenic Design, Emily Rebholz for Costume Design
