= Kathy Kohner-Zuckerman =

American surfer

- Born: Katherine Klara Kohner; January 19, 1941 (age 84); Los Angeles, California, U.S.
- Father: Frederick Kohner
- Relatives: Paul Kohner (uncle)

Kathy Kohner-Zuckerman (born January 19, 1941) is the real-life inspiration for the fictional character of Franzie (nicknamed Gidget) from the 1957 novel, Gidget: The Little Girl with Big Ideas, written by her father Frederick Kohner.

== Early life ==
Kathy Kohner was born Katherine Klara Kohner in 1941, the daughter of European Jewish immigrants Fritzi and Frederick Kohner, a Czechoslovak Jew who worked as a screenwriter for the German film industry until 1933.

She grew up in Brentwood, Los Angeles, and spent much of her childhood on the beaches at Malibu. From age 13 to 15, Kohner lived in Berlin with her parents where the family had moved so that Frederick could work with film producer Artur Brauner. She started surfing at the age of 15, sometimes trading her peanut butter and radish sandwiches for chances to ride. She associated with such influential surfers as Miki Dora, Mickey Munoz, Dewey Weber, and Tom Morey. At the age of 17, Kathy appeared on the television and radio quiz program You Bet Your Life with Groucho Marx. During her conversation with Marx, she revealed herself to be the inspiration for her father creating the character of Gidget. She won $500 and chose not to contest the major prize.

== Gidget phenomenon ==
Based on what Kohner told her father about her exploits in Malibu and the journal of her trips there, which her father discovered, he wrote Gidget: The Little Girl with Big Ideas. The book sold over 500,000 copies and was translated into Japanese, Spanish, and Hebrew, among other languages. Frederick Kohner sold the movie rights to Columbia Pictures (through the William Morris Agency) for $50,000, then giving five percent of this to his daughter Kathy. In 1959, Columbia Pictures, where Kohner had been a screenwriter, adapted the novel into a film starring Sandra Dee. Two other Gidget films and several television movies were made, as well as a 1965 television series starring Sally Field and a 1986 series starring Caryn Richman.

== Adult life ==
Kohner-Zuckerman attended Los Angeles Valley College, San Fernando Valley State College (now California State University, Northridge), and Oregon State University and then returned to Los Angeles to teach. She married Marvin Zuckerman, a professor of English and Yiddish. They have two children and live in Pacific Palisades.

Kohner-Zuckerman still surfs annually to benefit a cancer charity. She was named No. 7 in Surfer Magazine's 25 Most Influential People in Surfing. In 2008, she was inducted into the Southern California Jewish Sports Hall of Fame. In 2011, Kohner-Zuckerman was inducted into the Surfing Walk of Fame in Huntington Beach, California in the Woman of the Year category.

In January 2025, Kohner-Zuckerman and her husband were made homeless when the Palisades Fire destroyed their house.

== Quotes ==
"You know, it's overwhelming, and I'm really touched. All I did was surf a little and tell my story."

"I don't have the confidence I had when I was 15, I'm 64. I'm afraid of the other surfers. There weren't as many surfers in Malibu when I was a teenager."

"Some people have Alcoholic Anonymous, Starbucks, church, I was retreating, trying to get away from high school and boys and movies on Saturday night ... I had Malibu."

"Nobody knows I'm a real person -- they think 'Gidget' is Sandra Dee or Sally Field."

"I guess someone would have come along and done it eventually, had I not been there. I don't get it. All this talk of the 'Gidget' myth, and the legend of 'Gidget' ... all I know is now there are a million little 'Gidgets' in the water, and I think it's fantastic."
