= Susan Kohner =

American actress

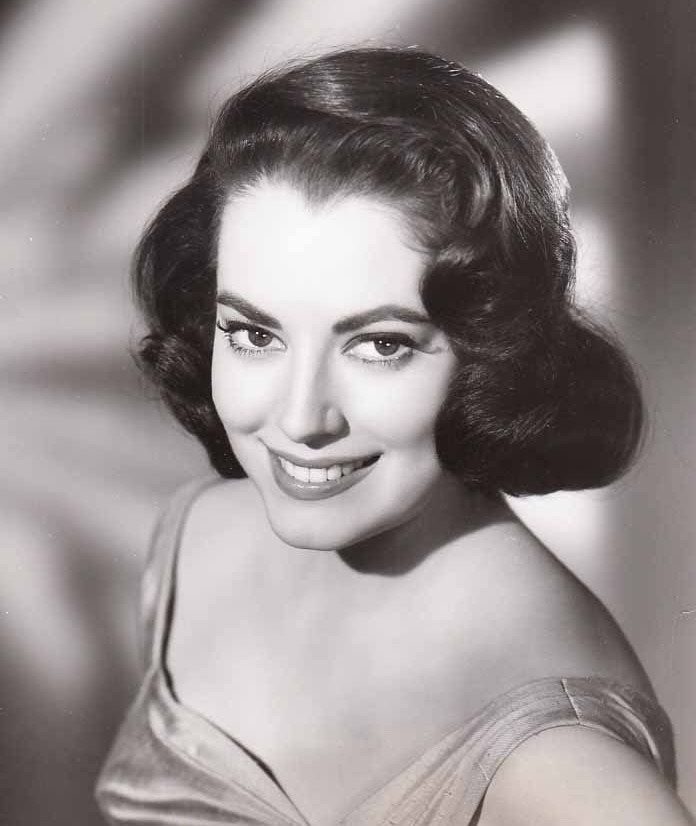
- Kohner in Imitation of Life (1959)
- Born: Susanna Kohner; November 11, 1936 (age 89); Los Angeles, California, U.S.
- Other name: Susan Weitz
- Occupation: Actress
- Years active: 1955–1964
- Known for: Imitation of Life; All the Fine Young Cannibals; Freud: The Secret Passion
- Spouse: John Weitz (m. 1964; died 2002)
- Children: Paul Weitz; Chris Weitz
- Parents: Paul Kohner (father); Lupita Tovar (mother)
- Awards: Golden Globe Award for Best Supporting Actress - Motion Picture

Susanna "Susan" Kohner (born November 11, 1936) is an American retired actress who worked in film and television. Her best-known role was as "Sarah Jane", a young African-American woman attempting to "pass" as white, in Imitation of Life (1959), for which Kohner was nominated for an Oscar as Best Supporting Actress. She won two Golden Globe awards for her performance.

Kohner married mens-wear designer and writer John Weitz in 1964. Their two sons, Paul and Chris, are both film directors, producers, screenwriters, and occasional actors.

== Early life ==
Kohner was born in Los Angeles, California, the daughter of Lupita Tovar, a Mexican-born actress who had a career in Hollywood, and Paul Kohner, a film producer who was born in Bohemia, Austria-Hungary. Her mother was Roman Catholic of Mexican and Irish descent; her father was of Bohemian Jewish descent.

== Career ==
Most of Kohner's film roles came during the late 1950s and early 1960s, including co-starring with Sal Mineo in both Dino (1957) and The Gene Krupa Story (1959).

In her best-known role, Kohner played Sarah Jane in Imitation of Life, portraying a light-skinned black woman who "passes" as white. The 1959 film was the second film adaptation of the 1933 book of the same name, with the first having been released in 1934. The plot had major changes to better reflect its own time.

The expensive, glossy Ross Hunter production, directed by Douglas Sirk and starring Lana Turner, was a box-office hit. In addition, Kohner was nominated for a Best Supporting Actress Academy Award for her role in the film. She won a Golden Globe as Best Supporting Actress and another as Best New Actress. Following her role in Imitation of Life, Kohner appeared in All the Fine Young Cannibals opposite Natalie Wood and Robert Wagner.

Her television debut was on February 4, 1956, in the "Long After Summer" episode of The Alcoa Hour. A review in the trade publication Billboard said that she "failed to impress." She later had guest roles on various television series, including Hong Kong, Going My Way, and Temple Houston. She made her last film appearance in 1962, costarring with Montgomery Clift in Freud: The Secret Passion. She retired from acting in 1964.

== Personal life ==
In 1964, Kohner married John Weitz, a German-born novelist and fashion designer. She retired from acting to devote time to her family. The couple had two sons together, Chris and Paul Weitz, who both became film directors and producers in Hollywood. Together they produced films such as American Pie (1999) and About a Boy (2002). Chris Weitz is also known for directing New Moon (2009), part of The Twilight Saga.

On April 23, 2010, a new print of Imitation of Life (1959) was screened at the TCM Film Festival in Los Angeles, California, to which Kohner and co-star Juanita Moore were invited. After the screening, the two women appeared on stage for a question-and-answer session hosted by TCM's Robert Osborne. Kohner and Moore received standing ovations.

== Acting credits ==
Film
| Year | Film | Role | Notes |
|---|---|---|---|
| 1955 | To Hell and Back | Maria | |
| 1956 | The Last Wagon | Jolie | |
| 1957 | Trooper Hook | Consuela | |
| 1957 | Dino | Shirley | Alternative title: Killer Dino |
| 1959 | Imitation of Life | Sarah Jane, age 18 | Also: Performer: "Empty Arms" |
| 1959 | The Big Fisherman | Princess Fara | |
| 1959 | The Gene Krupa Story | Ethel Maguire | Alternative title: Drum Crazy |
| 1960 | All the Fine Young Cannibals | Catherine McDowall | |
| 1961 | By Love Possessed | Helen Detweiler | |
| 1962 | Freud: The Secret Passion | Martha Freud | Alternative title: Freud |
Television
| Year | Title | Role | Notes |
| 1956 | The Alcoa Hour | Joanna | 1 episode |
| 1956 | Four Star Playhouse | Anita | 1 episode |
| 1956 | Cavalcade of American | | 1 episode: "A Bed of Roses" |
| 1956 | Climax! | | 2 episodes: "Child of the Wind/Throw Away the Cane," segment "Child of the Wind"; "Ten Minutes to Curfew" |
| 1956–1957 | Schlitz Playhouse of Stars | Angela O'Neill; Lynn Howell | 2 episodes: "Date for Tomorrow" as Angela O'Neill; "Dual Control" as Lynn Howell |
| 1957 | Matinee Theatre | Joanna Marshall | 2 episodes: " – "Letter to a Stranger"; "Laugh a Little Tear" |
| 1957 | Wagon Train | Mokai | 1 episode: "The Charles Avery Story" |
| 1957 | Suspicion | Gina | 1 episode: "The Flight" |
| 1958 | Alfred Hitchcock Presents | Therese Doniere | Season 3 Episode 22: "The Return of the Hero" |
| 1960 | Playhouse 90 | Rachel Heller | 1 episode: "In the Presence of Mine Enemies" |
| 1961 | The DuPont Show with June Allyson | Clare Anderson | 1 episode: "The Guilty Heart" |
| 1961 | Hong Kong | Elena | 1 episode: "The Innocent Exile" |
| 1961–1963 | Route 66 | Katy Webster; Midge Pierrepont | 2 episodes: "The Quick and the Dead" as Katy Webster; "But What Do You Do in March" as Midge Pierrepont |
| 1962 | Checkmate | Vicki Angelo | 1 episode: "Down the Gardenia Path" |
| 1962 | The Dick Powell Show | Miriam Marks | 1 episode: "Tomorrow, the Man" |
| 1963 | The Doctors and the Nurses | Terry Collins | 1 episode: "Root of Violence" |
| 1963 | Going My Way | Elaine Brady | 1 episode: "One Small Unhappy Family" |
| 1963 | Temple Houston | Ellena Romolo | 1 episode: "Toll the Bell Slowly" |
| 1964 | Rawhide | Abbie Bartlett | 1 episode: "Incident at Ten Trees" |
| 1964 | Channing | Rena | 1 episode: "A Bang and a Whimper" |

=== Theater ===
- 1958: Love Me Little by John G. Fuller at Helen Hayes Theatre. Role: Emily Whittaker. Broadway debut.
- 1962: Pullman Car Hiawatha by Thornton Wilder at Circle in the Square Theatre. Role: Harriet Milbury.
- 1963: Saint Joan by George Bernard Shaw at Vancouver Theater Festival. With Mike Nichols.

== Awards and nominations ==
| Year | Award | Result | Category | Film |
|---|---|---|---|---|
| 1959 | Academy Award | Nominated | Best Supporting Actress | Imitation of Life |
| 1959 | Golden Globe Award | Won | Most Promising Newcomer – Female | - |
| 1959 | Golden Globe Award | Won | Best Supporting Actress | Imitation of Life |
| 1962 | Golden Globe Award | Nominated | Best Supporting Actress | Freud: The Secret Passion |
| 1958 | Laurel Awards | Nominated | Top New Female Personality | - |
| 1959 | Laurel Awards | 2nd Place | Top New Female Personality | - |

== See also ==
- List of Czech Academy Award winners and nominees — Best Supporting Actress
- List of actors with Academy Award nominations
- John Weitz
- Chris Weitz
- Paul Weitz
- Lupita Tovar
- Paul Kohner
