= John Weitz =

American menswear designer (1923–2002)

- Weitz during a 1992 interview with Charlie Rose
- Born: Hans Werner Weitz; May 25, 1923; Berlin, Germany
- Died: October 3, 2002 (aged 79); Bridgehampton, New York, U.S.
- Occupations: Menswear designer Novelist and Historian
- Spouses: Sally Blauner Gould (m. 1944; div. 1953) Eve Orton (m. 1953; div. 1964) Susan Kohner (m. 1964)
- Children: 4, including Paul Weitz & Chris Weitz
- Relatives: Lupita Tovar (mother-in-law); Paul Kohner (father-in-law)
- Military Service
- Allegiance: United States of America
- Unit: Office of Strategic Services
- Conflicts: World War II

Hans Werner "John" Weitz (May 25, 1923 – October 3, 2002) was an American menswear designer who initiated licensing products and selling affordable but stylish clothing that featured his image in the advertising. He had a second career as a writer and historian. Weitz was also well known for being the husband of actress Susan Kohner and father of directors Paul Weitz and Chris Weitz.

== Early life ==
Weitz was born in Berlin, Germany, to father, Robert Salomon "Bobby" Weitz, a successful textile manufacturer, and mother, Hedwig "Hedy" Weitz (née Jacob). His parents were part of an active social scene during the Weimar Republic that was glamorous and filled with young artists, writers and actors such as Christopher Isherwood and Marlene Dietrich. The household was Jewish in ancestry and culture, but not religious.

When he was 10 years old, Weitz was sent to boarding school in England. He attended The Hall School from 1933 to 1936 and St. Paul's School from 1936 to 1939. After graduation, he was named vice-president of the Old Pauline Club of London. Weitz eventually attended Oxford University for one year. With the recommendation of St. Paul's classmate John Cavanagh, in 1939, Weitz worked in Paris as an apprentice to fashion designer Edward Molyneux. Weitz went to Shanghai, China, in order to wait for a visa to America; while there he played on the Shanghai Rugby Football Union team for a short time.

In 1938, Weitz' parents left Nazi Germany to live in Paris, then London, eventually relocating to New York City. The Weitz family immigrated to the United States via Yokohama, Japan, and Shanghai, China, where many refugee Jews stayed while trying to get to the United States, from their last permanent residence in London. They arrived in Seattle, Washington, in April 1941. They were joining Hedy's brother-in-law, Hermann Gross, in New York City. Weitz became a naturalized American in 1943.

In the United States, Weitz worked for a short time at Voice of America before enlisting in the US Army in 1943. During World War II, from 1943 to 1946, Weitz became an Office of Strategic Services ("OSS") intelligence officer, where his language skills (German, French) were important assets. His training at Camp Ritchie, Maryland classifies him as one of the Ritchie Boys. A group of approximately 20,000 G-2 soldiers who used their linguistics to interrogate POW's in Europe. During this time he was part of a 1944 mission in support of the plan to assassinate Adolf Hitler formulated by German Wehrmacht officers, under the instigation of Claus von Stauffenberg. After the war, Weitz helped to liberate the Dachau concentration camp.

== Career ==
=== Fashion ===
In 1945, after three years in the Army, Weitz went to work for his father at The Weitz Corporation. He worked in the women's lingerie department.

In 1947, with the help of his wife's parents, who owned Blauner's department stores, Weitz started the company John Weitz Juniors, Inc., in New York City, where he manufactured dresses and women's sportswear. The company was in business until 1953. In 1954, Weitz founded John Weitz Designs Inc. During this period Weitz found an early mentor in Dorothy Shaver of Lord & Taylor.

In 1964, Weitz shifted from womenswear to menswear, where he focused on classic styles and the practical use and durability of clothing.

As a popular menswear designer, Weitz was an early adopter in the late 1960s of licensing his name brand; he also used his own image in advertising his brand. His company was called John Weitz Designs, Inc. He carried a wide, diverse line of goods and was often featured in advertising that portrayed a glamorous lifestyle. One of Weitz' successful and well-known menswear items that were popular was socks. John Fairchild, editor of Women's Wear Daily, said that Weitz became a household name by successfully licensing and advertising his name on products, .

=== Writer ===
From 1970 to the 1990s, Weitz wrote both fiction and historical non-fiction, much centered on Nazi-era Germany. He also wrote frequent magazine articles on a variety of subjects, including his hobby as a race car driver. Weitz raced at Sebring International Raceway from 1955 to 1957, as well as the Bahamas Grand Prix Circuit.

While spending time on Long Island, Weitz was encouraged by the writer John Steinbeck to write. His early novels were bestsellers. While his early novels were semi-autobiographical, including focuses on style, the fashion business, and his experiences in Germany, his latter non-fiction books were serious biographies of Joachim von Ribbentrop, Foreign Minister of Third Reich, and Hjalmar Schacht, President of the Reichsbank and Minister of Economics.

== Personal life ==
Weitz was married three times. His first marriage, from 1944 to 1953, was to Sally Blauner Gould. He had married Blauner when he was 20 years old. Blauner was from Philadelphia, Pennsylvania, and her family owned the Blauner's department store chain. He had a daughter and son with Gould, Karen Weitz Curtis and Robert Weitz. In 1964, Weitz separated from his second wife, Eve Orton, who was a fashion editor.

In 1964, Weitz met actress Susan Kohner in Palm Beach, Florida. Kohner's father was a well known talent agent named Paul Kohner; her mother was actress Lupita Tovar. Weitz married Kohner in 1964. They had two sons, directors Paul Weitz and Chris Weitz.

In addition to his race car driving hobby, Weitz enjoyed boating, and was a member of yacht clubs in Palm Beach, East Hampton, Sag Harbor, as well as part of the US Naval Academy Sailing Squadron.

== Awards ==
- 1959: Sports Illustrated award
- 1960: NBC Today Show award
- 1964-1967: Caswell-Massey Awards
- 1966: Harper's Bazaar Medallion
- 1967: Moscow Diploma
- 1974: Coty American Fashion Critics' Award
- 1975: Brilliant Pen Award (MFI)
- 1981: Cartier Award for Design Excellence
- 1986: Cutty Sark Menswear Award
- 1986: Mayor's Liberty Award
- 1988: Order of Merit of the Federal Republic of Germany
- 1990: Ellis Island Medal of Honor
- 1990: Dallas Menswear Mart award
- 1990: Fashion Institute of Technology President's award
- 1992: Ellis Island Medal of Honor

== Works and publications ==
- Weitz, John. Sports Clothes for Your Sports Car. New York: Sports Car Press; distributed by Crown Publishers, 1958. OCLC 1498186
- Weitz, John. The Value of Nothing: A Novel. New York: Stein and Day, 1970. ISBN 978-0-812-81275-6 OCLC 15585961
- Weitz, John. Man in Charge; The Executive's Guide to Grooming, Manners, and Travel. New York: Macmillan, 1974. ISBN 978-0-026-25770-1 OCLC 948103
- Weitz, John. Friends in High Places. New York: Macmillan, 1982. ISBN 978-0-026-25920-0 OCLC 8494471
- Weitz, John. "Auto Motives." The New York Times. March 27, 1988.
- Weitz, John. Hitler's Diplomat The Life and Times of Joachim Von Ribbentrop. New York: Ticknor & Fields, 1992. ISBN 978-0-395-62152-3 OCLC 644173200
- Weitz, John. "Nazis Still Lead Reichstag Fire Suspects." The New York Times, Opinion. February 1, 1994.
- Weitz, John. Hitler's Banker: Hjalmar Horace Greeley Schacht. London: Warner, 1999. ISBN 978-0-751-52666-0 OCLC 422429570
