= European Film Fund =

The European Film Fund (EFF), also known as the European Relief Fund, was a non-profit organization established by the talent agent and producer Paul Kohner.

== History ==
The European Film Fund was founded on November 5, 1938 on the initiative of Paul Kohner, Ernst Lubitsch, and Universal Pictures studio head, Carl Laemmle. Founder members were William Dieterle, Bruno Frank, Felix Jackson, Salka Viertel and Ernst Lubitsch. The Domicile of the EFF was Paul Kohner Talent Agency and president was Ernst Lubitsch, because he was considered the best known European filmmaker in Hollywood. The organisation was founded to help European emigrants who needed Affidavits, money or jobs. That is why, Liesl Frank, Bruno Frank's wife, worked together with the Emergency Rescue Committee.

The fund collected and distributed money, some filmmakers donated one percent of their fees. For example, Michael Curtiz and William Wyler, both Jewish and, respectively, of Hungarian and Swiss-German origin, were especially generous. Furthermore, there were earnings from benefit performances.

In the early 1940s the fund earned about $40,000. Some persons were supported by credits, others by donations. Several beneficiaries of the EFF got jobs in the film industry (esp. at Metro-Goldwyn-Mayer and Warner Bros.) as screenwriters. These jobs weren't paid very well but they often were the precondition for getting visas. Many European filmmakers couldn't repay the money, because they didn't find well paid jobs.

The more clear-headed émigrés understood very soon that these salaries paid them by Hollywood were fictitious, at least when the realized that, while they earned $100 or $200 a week for completely useless work, a real screen writer earned $3,500. It was quite symbolic that once their contracts expired[…].

EFF was closed in 1948.

== List of benefit recipients ==
- Heinrich Mann
- Leonhard Frank
- Alfred Döblin
- Wilhelm Speyer
- Hans G. Lustig
- Walter Mehring
- Bertolt Brecht
- Ludwig Marcuse
- Ernst Lothar
