= Dino (film) =

1957 film by Thomas Carr

- Directed by: Thomas Carr
- Written by: Reginald Rose
- Produced by: Bernice Block
- Starring: Sal Mineo; Brian Keith; Susan Kohner
- Cinematography: Wilfred M. Cline
- Edited by: William Austin
- Music by: Gerald Fried
- Release date: 1957
- Running time: 94 minutes
- Country: United States

Dino is a 1957 American drama film directed by Thomas Carr, written by Reginald Rose, and starring Sal Mineo, Brian Keith and Susan Kohner. It was an adaptation of a teleplay of the same name originally broadcast in 1956 on Westinghouse Studio One. The picture was released as part of a double feature in April 1957.

== Plot ==
The film opens as Dino is released from a juvenile detention center where he has spent several years for taking part in a murder of a night watchmen when he was 13 years old. He is brought by his case worker Mr. Mandel to Larry Sheridan, a case worker at the local settlement house, for therapy. While initially hesitant to take on a new patient due to his heavy workload, he agrees to see Dino and continues seeing him after he meets the troubled young man. It is revealed that Dino's family life is problematic and that Dino has as much trouble liking himself as others do liking him. While he has been away, his brother has been involved with a gang and Dino is persuaded to become involved in their next “job”, the robbery of a gas station.

== Cast ==
- Sal Mineo Dino Minetta
- Brian Keith as Larry Sheridan
- Susan Kohner as Shirley
- Frank Faylen as Frank Mandel
- Joe De Santis as Mr. Minetta
- Pat DeSimone as Tony Minetta
- Penny Santon as Mrs. Minetta
- Richard Bakalyan as Chuck
- Molly McCart as Frances
- Cynthia Chenault as Sylvia (billed as Cindy Robbins)
- Rafael Campos as boy #2

== Original TV play ==
"Dino (film)"
- Studio One episode
- Episode no.: Season 8 Episode 16
- Directed by: Paul Nickell
- Written by: Reginald Rose
- Original air date: January 2, 1956

Guest appearances
- Ralph Meeker as Larry Sheridan; Sal Mineo as Dino Manetta; Dort Clark as Larry Mandel; Rudy Bond as Mr. Manetta; Pat DeSimone as Tony Manetta; Carolyn Brenner as Mrs. Manetta; Edgar Stehli as Mr. Fields

The story originally debuted on TV in 1956.

The Cleveland Plain Dealer felt Mineo "breathed real life into the role." The San Francisco Examiner praised Mineo's "remarkable and sensitively tough performance."

Mineo's performance earned him an Emmy nomination.

== Production ==
Producer Bernice Block made this film (her first) because she saw Reginald Rose's original television drama, then bought it because she "loved it.".

The film was set up at Allied Artists, which had made another movie based on a Rose television script, Crime in the Streets.

Sal Mineo and Pat DeSimmone are the only actors to reprise their roles from the original teleplay. Mineo's brother, Michael Mineo, was also cast in the film as Rico. This is the only film the two appear in together.

Filming started 14 January 1957.

== Reception ==
Variety called it "a forceful and tense juvenile deliquency yarn."
