= Paul Kohner =

Austrian-American talent agent and producer

- Born: May 29, 1902; Teplitz-Schönau, Austria-Hungary
- Died: March 16, 1988 (aged 85); Los Angeles, California, U.S.
- Citizenship: Austria, United States
- Occupations: Producer; Talent agent
- Years active: 1927–1988
- Spouse: Lupita Tovar (m. 1932)
- Partner: Mary Philbin (1923–1927)
- Children: 2, including Susan Kohner
- Relatives: Frederick Kohner (brother); Kathy Kohner-Zuckerman (niece); John Weitz (son-in-law); Paul Weitz (grandson); Chris Weitz (grandson)

Paul Kohner (May 29, 1902 – March 16, 1988) was an Austrian-American talent agent and producer who managed the careers of Ingrid Bergman, Maurice Chevalier, Marlene Dietrich, Greta Garbo, John Huston, Liv Ullmann and Billy Wilder, as well as actors who came from Europe before World War II.

== Early life ==
Kohner was born to a Jewish family in Teplitz-Schönau, Austria-Hungary (now Teplice, Czech Republic). His father was Julius "Kino" Kohner, who managed the local movie theater and published a film industry newspaper, and his mother was Helene Kohner (née Beamt). He had two brothers, Friedrich "Frederick" Kohner, a film and TV writer who created the character Gidget (based on his daughter, Kathy), and Walter Kohner, a Hollywood agent whose wife, Hanna Kohner, in May 1953, was the first non-celebrity featured on This Is Your Life, the television show, where she was the first Holocaust survivor to talk about her experiences in concentration and death camps on television.

== Career ==
=== Producer ===
As a young man, Kohner worked as a news reporter at his father's magazine Internationale Filmschau, which focused on the film industry. He met Carl Laemmle during an interview in Karlovy Vary in 1920. Laemmle was impressed by 18-year old Kohner and offered him a job. Kohner decided to move to the United States. Kohner started out as an office errand boy at Laemmle's company, Universal Pictures, in New York. There, he became friends with another young émigré working for Universal, William Wyler. He moved to Hollywood and worked his way up the studio system, working in positions at Universal like unit production supervisor as well as casting director. Because of his knowledge of film production and background in Germany, Kohner went on to head Universal Pictures' European production offices located in Berlin, Germany in the late 1920s. Kohner moved back to the United States in the early 1930s. He worked as a producer, responsible for shepherding many Universal Pictures films like the Lon Chaney version of The Hunchback of Notre Dame, William Wyler's A House Divided that starred Walter Huston, among others.

Kohner produced many alternate language versions of films that were often shot simultaneously with their English-language counterparts, sometimes shooting at night on the same sets, but with Spanish casts of actors and different costumes. Kohner's wife, Lupita Tovar, starred in some of these Spanish language film versions, including Drácula (1931).

=== Talent agent ===
In 1938, Kohner founded the Paul Kohner Talent Agency and managed the careers of Marlene Dietrich, Greta Garbo, Dolores del Río, Maurice Chevalier, Billy Wilder, Henry Fonda, David Niven, Erich von Stroheim, Ingmar Bergman, Lana Turner, Liv Ullmann, and others. Many of his clients had left war-torn Europe, fleeing Nazi Germany. John Huston was Kohner's client for over forty years. The company was in business from 1935 to 1988.

Paul Kohner's office was on the Sunset Strip in a building owned by a partner of his, Stanley Bergerman, who was Carl Laemmle's son-in-law. The facade of the building, located across the street from the now-defunct restaurant, the Cock and Bull, can be glimpsed in the film The Strip (1951) starring Mickey Rooney.

In 1976, Kohner partnered with agent Michael Levy to form the Paul Kohner-Michael Levy Agency.

=== European Film Fund ===
In 1938, Kohner co-founded the European Film Fund with Ernst Lubitsch, and Universal Pictures studio head, Carl Laemmle. From 1938 to 1948, during World War II, the Fund worked in an effort to provide assistance to émigrés trying to relocate to America.

== Personal life ==
From 1923 to 1927, Kohner was in a relationship with Mary Philbin. They became engaged in 1926, but never married due to the disapproval of Philbin's parents. It was rumored they were going to marry in June 1929, but it did not happen. When Kohner died, he still had love letters Philbin had written to him in his possession. She had also kept his. Kohner and actress Lupita Tovar were married in Czechoslovakia on October 30, 1932, at Kohner's parents' home by a rabbi.

In 1936, the couple had a daughter, Susan Kohner, a film and television actress, and, in 1939, a son, Paul Julius "Pancho" Kohner Jr., later a director and producer. The family lived for many years in the Bel Air neighborhood of Los Angeles, California, near filmmaker Alexander Korda. Their grandsons, Chris and Paul Weitz, are successful film directors. Kohner spoke six languages.

In 1988, Kohner died of a heart attack in Los Angeles, California.

His wife, the Mexican-born film actress Lupita Tovar, died at age 106 on November 12, 2016.

== Honors ==
- April 1997: "Hollywood's Gentleman Agent: Paul Kohner." Exhibit curated by Goethe-Institut Los Angeles and Stifting Deutsche Kinemathek.

== Filmography ==
- 1927: Surrender (Universal) – Supervisor
- 1927: The Cat and the Canary (Universal) – Supervising producer (uncredited)
- 1927: Love Me and the World Is Mine (Universal) (based on the book The Affairs of Hannerl) – Supervising producer; Writer, scenario
- 1927: A Man's Past (Universal) – Supervising producer (uncredited); Writer, adaptation
- 1928: The Man Who Laughs (Universal) – Production supervisor
- 1929: The Brandenburg Arch (Deutsche Universal-Film) – Producer
- 1929: Rustle of Spring German: Frühlingsrauschen (Deutsche Universal-Film) – Producer
- 1929: White Hell of Pitz Palu (Universal) (1930 sound film version in English, released by Universal internationally) – Associate producer
- 1929: Die seltsame Vergangenheit der Thea Carter (English title: The Unusual Past of Thea Carter) (Deutsche Universal-Film) – producer
- 1930: Ludwig der Zweite, König von Bayern (Deutsche Universal-Film) (English title: Ludwig II, King of Bavaria) – Producer
- 1930: La Voluntad del muerto (Universal) (Spanish language version of The Cat Creeps) – Producer
- 1930: Oriente es Occidente (Universal) (Spanish language version of East Is West) – Producer
- 1931: Don Juan Diplomático (Universal) (Spanish language version of the English and French films, The Boudoir Diplomat and Boudoir Diplomatique) – Production supervisor
- 1931: Liebe auf Befehl (Universal) (German language version of the English and French films, The Boudoir Diplomat and Boudoir Diplomatique) – Production manager
- 1931: Resurrección (Mexican) (Spanish language version of A Woman's Resurrection) – Production supervisor
- 1931: El Tenorio del Harem (Universal) (Spanish language version of Arabian Knights) – Production supervisor
- 1931: Drácula (Universal) (Spanish language version of Dracula) – Associate producer
- 1931: East of Borneo (Universal) – Associate producer
- 1931: A House Divided (Universal) – Associate producer
- 1932: Doomed Battalion (Universal) – Associate producer
- 1932: Der Rebell (Deutsche Universal-Film) (German language version of The Rebel) – Producer
- 1933: The Rebel (Deutsche Universal-Film) – Producer
- 1933: S.O.S. Eisberg (Deutsche Universal-Film) (German language version of S.O.S. Iceberg) – Associate producer
- 1933: S.O.S. Iceberg (Universal Pictures) – Associate producer
- 1934: Der Verlorene Sohn (Deutsche Universal-Film) (English title: The Prodigal Son) – Producer
- 1935: Alas sobre El Chaco (Universal) (Spanish language version of Storm Over the Andes) – Producer
- 1935: East of Java (Universal) – Producer
- 1936: Next Time We Love (Universal) – Producer
- 1978: Erich von Stroheim – Der Mann mit dem bösen Blick (TV movie) – Participation
- 1986: Fast ein Jahrhundert – Luis Trenker – Participation
- 1989: Wer war Arnold Fanck? – Participation

== See also ==
- European Film Fund
- Lupita Tovar
- Frederick Kohner
- Susan Kohner
- John Weitz
- Paul Weitz
- Chris Weitz
