= Nick Flynn =

American writer, playwright, and poet

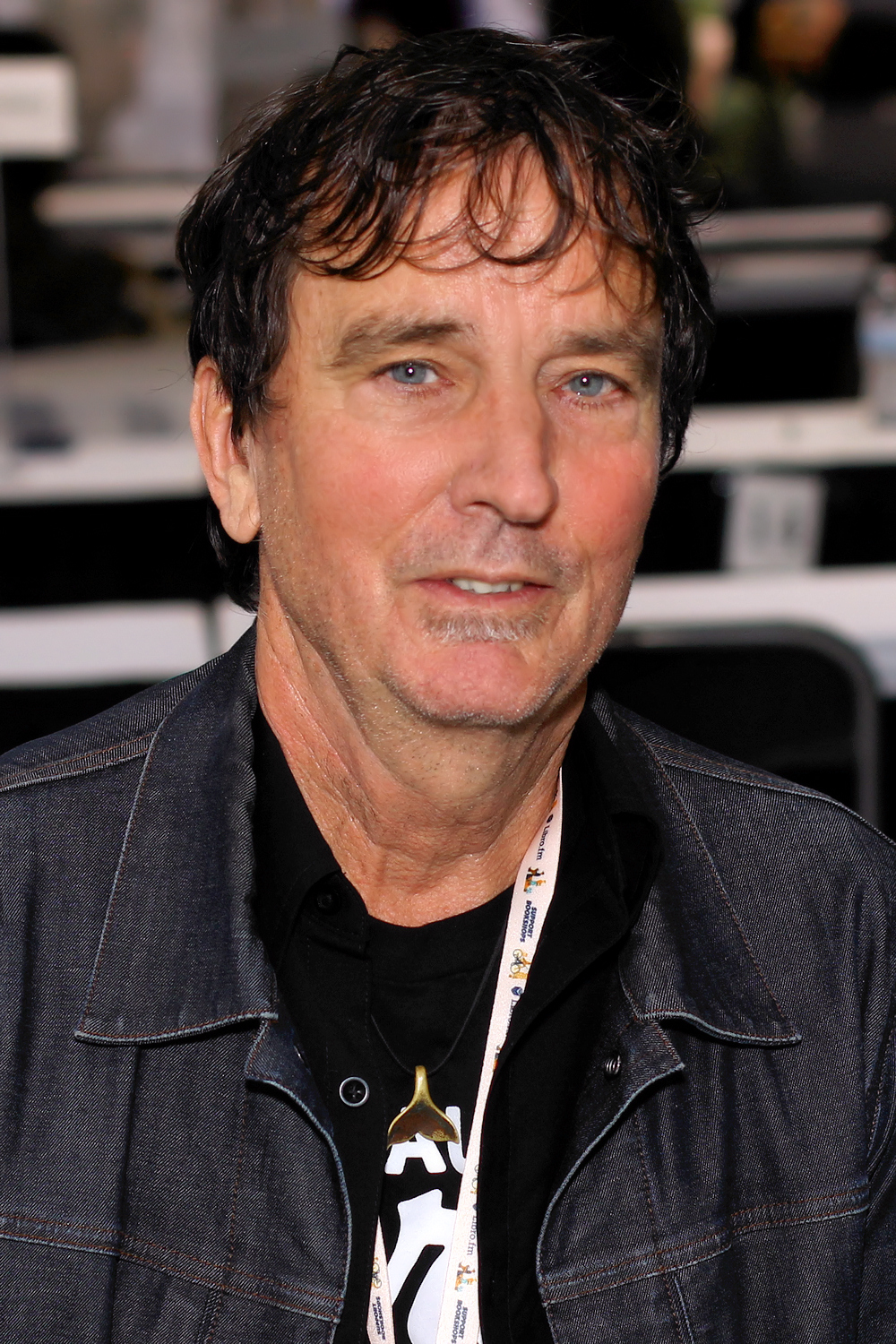
- Flynn at 2023 Texas Book Festival
- Born: January 26, 1960 (age 66); Scituate, Massachusetts, US
- Occupations: Author; poet; playwright; professor
- Spouse: Lili Taylor (m. 2009)
- Children: 1
- Writing career
- Notable works: The Reenactments (2013); Another Bullshit Night in Suck City (2004); Some Ether (2000)
- Notable awards: Guggenheim Fellowship; Witter Bynner Fellowship; PEN/Joyce Osterweil Award for Poetry
- Website: www.nickflynn.org

Nick Flynn (born January 26, 1960) is an American writer, playwright, and poet.

== Life and career ==
Nick Flynn was raised by his mother in Scituate, Massachusetts.

Flynn had no contact with his father throughout most of his childhood and adolescence as his parents separated when he was six months old. As a child, he was discouraged from pursuing a writing career because his father had identified himself as a writer to his mother when they first met. Flynn claims that, along with his father's alcoholism, a reason for his parents' separation was his father's "delusion of greatness" directly connected to his being an artist. Flynn first became an electrician instead of a writer after graduating high school, because of the stigma associated with the latter.

At 20, he was offered a scholarship to study English at University of Massachusetts Amherst. He studied with Fred Robinson, who was then married to Marilyn Robinson—she would sometimes teach his classes. It was at UMass that Flynn was first exposed to contemporary poetry, in a workshop taught by James Tate. In fall of 1982 Flynn's mother committed suicide. Subsequently, unable to continue with his studies, Flynn dropped out of school and ended up working at the Pine Street Inn, a homeless shelter in Boston. He took classes at various colleges and universities over the next several years to finish his undergraduate degree, while living in the Fort Point Channel on a boat he and a friend had renovated.

When he was 27, Flynn was unexpectedly reunited with his father at the Pine Street Inn, when his then-homeless father showed up as a "guest". At 29, Flynn began therapy, got sober, and began taking poetry workshops, first with Carolyn Forche, then with Marie Howe. The following year he was awarded a fellowship at the Fine Arts Work Center in Provincetown, Massachusetts, where he became friends with Jacqueline Woodson, Tim Seibles, Paul Lisicky, Mark Doty, Stanley Kunitz, Alan Dugan, Carl Phillips, and others. In 1992, he moved to Brooklyn to pursue his Master of Arts in poetry at New York University. At NYU, he studied with Sharon Olds, Phil Levine, Galway Kinnell, William Matthews, and Allen Ginsberg.

From 1992 to 1999, he was a member of the Teachers College Reading and Writing Project at Columbia University, in which he served as an educator and consultant in New York public schools. He left Brooklyn in 1999 for a second fellowship at the Fine Arts Work Center, where he finished his first book of poems, Some Ether (2000), begun ten years earlier. That same year he was awarded a Guggenheim Fellowship, as well as an Amy Lowell Traveling Poetry Fellowship, which allowed him to live in Rome from 2001 to 2003. While in Rome he finished work on Another Bullshit Night in Suck City, as well as traveling extensively, mainly to Dublin, Paris, and Tanzania. It was in Rome where he met and became friends with Austrian filmmaker Hubert Sauper. Flynn collaborated on Sauper's Academy Awards nominated documentary Darwin's Nightmare—traveling to Tanzania for the filming and to Paris for the editing.

Flynn's poems, essays, and nonfiction have been featured in The New Yorker, Paris Review, National Public Radio's This American Life, and The New York Times Book Review.

Since 2004, Flynn has been a professor on the Creative Writing faculty at the University of Houston, where he is in residence each Spring, teaching workshops in poetry and interdisciplinary / collaborative art.

In 2009, he married his long-time partner, actress Lili Taylor. Flynn and Taylor live in Brooklyn with their daughter, Maeve.

== Books ==
This Is the Night Our House Will Catch Fire (2020) circles around the lingering effects of his mother having set their house on fire when he was six years old. It is a hybrid of several genres, including memoir, fairy tale, theater, police reports, poetry, essay, speculative fiction, and magic realism. It is the sibling to I Will Destroy You (2019), which Flynn revised by performing each poem with his band Killdeer over the five years of its writing.

Stay: threads, conversations, collaborations (2020) gathers together 30 years of Flynn's writing, alongside his collaborations with artists, including Jack Pierson, Catherine Opie, Kevin Jerome Everson, Sarah Lipstate, Paul Weitz, Rachel Eliza Griffiths, Sarah Sentilles, Amy Arbus, Ryan McGinley, Zoe Leonard, Mark Adams, Bill Schuck, Guy Barash, Mel Chin, M. P. Landis, Jared Handelsman, Alix Lambert, Gabriel Martinez, Douglas Padgett, Kahn & Selesnick, Josh Neufeld, David Brody, Daniel Heyman, Mischa Richter, Jim Peters / Kathleen Carr, and Marilyn Minter.

The Reenactments (2013) chronicles Flynn's experience during the making of Being Flynn, a 2012 film based on his acclaimed 2004 memoir, Another Bullshit Night in Suck City. His readings on neuroscience and memory, including books by V. S. Ramachandran, David Eagleman, and Antonio Damasio, helped him to comprehend his experience of being on set for the reenactment of his mother's death by Julianne Moore. My Feelings (2015) is the sibling to The Reenactments.

In The Ticking Is the Bomb (2009), his second memoir, Flynn explored U.S. state-sanctioned torture, as well as his decision to have a child. The title was inspired by the Buddhist teacher Thich Nhat Hanh, who Flynn has studied with since 1990. It is the sibling to The Captain Asks for a Show of Hands (2011), which continued on similar themes.

Another Bullshit Night in Suck City (2004), a New York Times Bestseller, won the PEN/Martha Albrand Award for the Art of the Memoir, was a finalist for France's Prix Femina, and has been translated into fifteen languages. It documents Flynn's years working at The Pine Street Inn, a homeless shelter in Boston. It uses a form of lyric reportage to examine the creation of homelessness in the U.S., as well as his relationship with his father. It includes lyric fragments, short plays, lists, and documents. Another Bullshit Night in Suck City is the sibling to his first book of poetry, Some Ether (2000), which won the inaugural PEN/Joyce Osterweil Award for Poetry in 1999, and was a finalist for the Los Angeles Times Book Prize.

His book Low was published by Graywolf Press in 2023.

== Awards ==
- 2020 Writers' League of Texas Book Award (Finalist), I Will Destroy You
- 2018 Djerassi Resident Artists Program (Residency)
- 2018 Lannan Residency Fellowship (Residency)
- 2015 10 July 2015 proclaimed Nick Flynn Day by Boston Mayor Marty Walsh
- 2014 Erikson Institute Prize for Excellence in Mental Health Media
- 2011 Atlantic Center for the Arts (Residency)
- 2006 Prix Femina (Finalist), Another Bullshit Night in Suck City
- 2005 PEN/Martha Albrand Award for the Art of the Memoir, Another Bullshit Night in Suck City
- 2003 Massachusetts Center for the Book Poetry Award (Finalist), Blind Huber
- 2003 Yaddo (Residency)
- 2001 Guggenheim Fellowship
- 2001 Witter Bynner Fellowship
- 2001 MacDowell Colony (Residency)
- 2001 Amy Lowell Poetry Travelling Scholarship
- 1999 PEN/Joyce Osterweil Award for Poetry, Some Ether
- 2000 Los Angeles Times Book Prize (Finalist), Some Ether
- 1999 Larry Levis Prize (Virginia Commonwealth University), Some Ether
- 1999 Discovery/The Nation Award
- 1999 Fine Arts Work Center (Residency)
- 1997 Millay Colony for the Arts (Residency)
- 1995 MacDowell Colony (Residency)
- 1995 Djerassi Resident Artists Program (Residency)
- 1991 Fine Arts Work Center (Residency)

== Bibliography ==
=== Poetry ===
Collections

- Some Ether (Graywolf Press, 2000) ISBN 978-1555973032
- Blind Huber (Graywolf Press, 2002) ISBN 978-1555973735
- The Captain Asks for a Show of Hands (Graywolf Press, 2011) ISBN 978-1555976330
- My Feelings (Graywolf Press, 2015) ISBN 978-1555977108
- I Will Destroy You (Graywolf Press, 2019) ISBN 978-1-64445-002-4
- Low (Graywolf Press, 2023) ISBN 978-1-64445-259-2

List of poems

Title	Year	First published	Reprinted/collected
"Cartoon Physics, part 1"			Josh Neufeld published drawings inspired by the poem in Crossroads magazine, 2001.
"The Day Lou Reed Died"	2013		

=== Plays ===
- Alice Invents a Little Game and Alice Always Wins (Faber & Faber, 2008) ISBN 978-0865479852

=== Memoirs ===
- Another Bullshit Night in Suck City (W. W. Norton & Company, 2004) ISBN 0-393-05139-0
- The Ticking Is the Bomb (W. W. Norton & Company, 2010) ISBN 978-0393338867
- The Reenactments (W. W. Norton & Company, 2013) ISBN 978-0393344356
- This Is the Night Our House Will Catch Fire (W. W. Norton & Company, 2020) ISBN 978-1-324-00554-4

=== Nonfiction ===
- A Note Slipped Under the Door: Teaching from Poems We Love (Stenhouse Publishers, 2000, co-authored with Shirley McPhillips) ISBN 978-1571103208

=== Hybrid ===
- Stay: Threads, Conversations, Collaborations (The Unnamed Press, 2020) ISBN 978-1733540117

=== Forewords ===
- The Thing That Brought the Shadow Here, Alison Stegner (BOATT Press, 2019) ISBN 9780999492260
- Rail, Kai Carlson-Wee (Boa Editions, 2018) ISBN 978-1-942683-58-2
- Likenesses, Heather Tone (American Poetry Review, 2016) ISBN 978-0983300830
- The Wound, Laurent Mauvignier (University of Nebraska Press), 2015) ISBN 978-0803239876
- The Funk & Wag from A to Z, Mel Chin (The Menil Collection, 2014) ISBN 978-0300204506
- Err to Narrow, Alicia Salvadeo (New American Poets Chapbook Series, 2014)
- Guernica Annual #1 (Foreword, 2014) ISBN 9781608465088
- Tipping Point, Fred Marchant (The Word Works, 2013) ISBN 978-0915380862
- Render / An Apocalypse, Rebecca Gayle Howell (Cleveland State University Poetry Center, 2013) ISBN 978-0986025730
- The Hide-and-Seek Muse, Lisa Russ Spaar (Drunken Boat Media, 2013) ISBN 978-0988241602
- Ploughshares (Introduction, 2012)

=== Collaborations and limited editions ===
- Cartoon Physics, Sara Press, artist. (Deeply Game Publishing, 2019)
- City of Notions, Danielle Legros Georges, ed. (City of Boston, 2017 ["Marathon," "Aquarium"]
- Girls in Trees, Rebecca Godfrey, ed. (Instar Lodge, 2016) ["When I Was a Girl"]
- The Ezra Pound Collection, Beowulf Sheehan, photographer. (Horowitz, 2016) [portrait]
- The Funk & Wag from A to Z, Mel Chin, concept artist (The Menil Collection, 2014) [editor / collaborator] ISBN 978-0300204506
- Lexique Nomade, (Assises du Roman, 2012) ["Mot"]
- Re d acted, Daniel Heyman, artist (2011). ["7 testimonies"]
- Saudade, Mischa Richter, photographer. (Land's End Press, 2010) ["saudade"] ISBN 978-0982884904
- River of Words: Portraits of Hudson Valley Writers, Nina Shengold, ed. / Jennifer May, photographer (Excelsior Editions, 2010) [profile / portrait] ISBN 978-1438434254
- Damaged Romanticism: A Mirror of Modern Emotion, Terrie Sultan, ed. (Giles, 2008) ISBN 978-1904832515 ["A Crystal Formed Entirely of Holes"]

=== Work in anthologies ===
- The Book of Poetry for Hard Times, Robert Pinsky, ed. (W. W. Norton & Company, 2021) ISBN 978-1324001782 ["Sudden"]
- Buzz Words: Poems About Insects, Kimiko Hahn and Harold Schechter, eds. (Everyman's Library, 2021) ISBN 978-1101908266 ["Workers (Attendants)"]
- Tables of Contents Community Cookbook, Evan Hanczor, ed. (2021)
- Diario de la Pandemia, Guadalupe Nettel, ed. (Revista de la Universidad de Mexico, 2020) ["Corona"]
- Staying Human: New Poems for Staying Alive, Neil Astley, ed. (Bloodaxe Books, 2020) ISBN 978-1780373904 ["The Day Lou Reed Died"]
- More Truly and More Strange: 100 Contemporary Self-Portrait Poems, Lisa Russ Spaar, ed. (Persea Books, 2020) ISBN 978-0892555062 ["self-exam (my body is a cage)"]
- The Mind Has Cliffs of Fall: Poems at the Extremes of Feeling, Robert Pinsky, ed. (W. W. Norton & Company, 2019) ISBN 978-1324001782 ["Sudden"]
- Eat, Joy: Stories & Comfort Food from 31 Celebrated Writers, Natalie Eve, Garrett, ed. (Black Balloon Publishing, 2019) ISBN 978-1936787791
- The Kiss: Intimacies from Writers, Brian Turner, ed. (W. W. Norton & Company, 2018) ISBN 978-0393635263 ["The Last Kiss"]
- Knitting Pearls: Writers Writing About Knitting. Ann Hood, ed. (W. W. Norton & Company, 2018) ISBN 978-0393353259 ["Wool"]
- Brooklyn Poets Anthology, Jason Koo & Joe Pan, eds. (Brooklyn Arts Press, 2017) ISBN 978-1936767526 ["false prophet", etc.]
- Bullets Into Bells: Poets & Citizens Respond to Gun Violence, Brian Clements, Alexandra Teague & Dean Rader, eds. (Beacon Press, 2017) ISBN 978-0807025581 ["My Mother Contemplating Her Gun"]
- Inheriting the War; Poetry & Prose by Descendants of Vietnam Veterans and Refugees, Laren McClung, ed. (W.W. Norton, 2017) ISBN 978-0393354287 ["The Fruit of My Deeds"]
- Los Hijos de Whitman, Francisco Larios, ed. (Valparaiso, 2017) ISBN 978-6078437238 ["Fisica de los Dibujos Animados, 1st parte"]
- The Golden Shovel Anthology: Poems Honoring Gwendolyn Brooks, Peter Kahn, Ravi Shakar, & Patricia Smith, eds. (University of Arkansas Press, 2017) ISBN 9781682260241 ["Sky Burial"]
- Renga for Obama, Major Jackson, ed. (Harvard, 2017) ISBN 9780965237215 [a collaboration with Vievee Francis]
- Girls in Trees, Rebecca Godfrey, ed. (limited edition, 2016) ["When I Was a Girl"]
- Awake at the Bedside: Contemplative Teachings on Pallative & End-of-Life Care, Koshin Paley Ellison & Matt Weingast, eds. (Wisdom Press, 2016) ISBN 978-1614291190 ["The Washing of the Body"]
- Why We Write About Ourselves, Meredith Maren, ed. (Plume, 2016) ISBN 978-0142181973 [excerpts from The Reenactments / interview]
- Nowhere, Porter Fox, ed. (Nowhere Publishing, 2016) ISBN 978-0692822678 ["Chole"]
- If Bees Are Few: A Hive of Bee Poems, James P. Lenfestley, ed. (University of Minnesota Press, 2016) ISBN 978-0816698066 ["Hive", etc.]
- Monticello in Mind: Fifty Contemporary Poems on Jefferson, Lisa Russ Spaar, ed. (University of Virginia Press, 2016) ISBN 978-0813938509 ["When I Was a Girl"]
- A Manner of Being: Writers on their Mentors, Annie Liontas & Jeff Parker, eds. (University of Massachusetts Press, 2016) ISBN 978-1625341815 ["On Phil Levine"]
- Family Resemblances: An Anthology & Exploration of 8 Hybrid Literary Genres, Marcela Sulak & Jacqueline Kolosov, eds. (Rose Metal Press, 2015) ISBN 978-1941628027 ["On "Santa Lear""]
- Because You Asked: A Book of Answers on the Art & Craft of the Writing Life, Katrina Roberts, ed. (Lost Horse Press, 2015) ISBN 978-0990819356 ["Aftermath"]
- 365 Poems for Every Occasion, Academy of American Poets / Poem-A-Day, eds. (Abrams Image, 2015) ISBN 978-1419717994 ["forgetting something", etc.]
- Words Without Walls: Writers on Addiction, Violence, & Incarceration, Sheryl St. Germain & Sarah Shotland, eds. (Trinity University Press, 2015) ISBN 978-1595342553 ["same again"]
- The Penguin Anthology of Twentieth Century American Poetry, Rita Dove, ed. (Penguin Books, 2013) ISBN 978-0143121480 ["Bag of Mice", etc.]
- The Art of Losing: Poems of Grief & Healing, Kevin Young, ed. (Bloomsbury USA, 2013) ISBN 978-1608194667 ["Sudden," etc.]
- The Strangest of Theaters: Poets Writing Across Borders, Jared Hawkley, Susan Rich & Brian Turner, eds. (McSweeneys, 2013) ISBN 978-1938073274 ["Field Poet"]
- Death Poems, Russ Kick, ed. (Disinformation Books, 2013) ISBN 978-1938875045 ["My Mother Contemplating Her Gun"]
- Braving the Fire: A Guide to Writing About Grief & Loss, Jessica Handler (ed.) (Griffin, 2013) ISBN 978-1250014634 [excerpts / interviews]
- Coming Close: Forty Essays on Philip Levine, Mari L'Esperance & Tomas Q. Morin, eds. (Prairie Lights Books, 2013) ISBN 978-0985932527 ["A Light Inside']
- American Tensions: Literature of Identity & the Search for Social Justice, William Reichard, ed. (New Village Press, 2011) ISBN 978-0981559384 ["Other Meaning"]
- The Autumn House Anthology of Contemporary American Poetry,Sue Ellen Thompson, ed. (Autumn House Press, 2011) ISBN 978-1932870060
- Bound to Last: 30 Writers on Their Most Cherished Book, Sean Manning, ed. (Da Capo Press, 2010) ISBN 978-0306819216 [The Shadow of the Sun, Ryszard Kapuscinski]
- The Book of Dads, Ben George, ed. (Harper Perennial, 2009) ISBN 978-0061711558 ["Here Comes the Sun"]
- The Best American Non-Required Reading, Dave Eggers, ed. (Mariner Books, 2009) ISBN 978-0547241609 [excerpts from The Ticking is the Bomb]
- The Show I'll Never Forget, Sean Manning, ed. (Da Capo Press, 2009) ISBN 978-0306815089 ["Mink DeVille at the Paradise, Boston, 1978"]
- Crime, Alix Lambert, ed. (Fuel Publishing, 2008) ISBN 978-0955006180 [interview]
- Satellite Convulsions: Poems from Tin House, CJ Evans, ed. (Tin House Books, 2008) ISBN 978-0979419898 ["fire", etc.]
- The Autobiographer's Handbook, Jennifer Trang, ed. (Holt Paperback, 2008) ISBN 978-0805087130 [interview]
- Sex for America: Politically Inspired Erotica, Stephen Elliott, ed. (Harper Perennial, 2008) ISBN 978-0061351211 ["A Crystal Formed Entirely of Holes"]
- Not Quite What I Was Planning: Six-Word Memoirs by Writers Famous & Obscure, Rachel Fershleiser & Larry Smith, eds. (Harper Perennial, 2008) ISBN 978-0061374050
- State of the Union: 50 Political Poems, Joshua Beckman & Matthew Zapruder, eds. (Wave Books, 2008) ISBN 978-1933517339 ["imagination"]
- The Book of Irish American Poetry: From the 18th Century to the Present, Daniel Tobin, ed. (University of Notre Dame Press, 2007) ISBN 978-0268042301
- Joyful Noise: An Anthology of American Spiritual Poetry, Robert Strong, ed. (Autumn House Press, 2006) ISBN 978-1932870121
- Legitimate Dangers: American Poets of the New Century, Cate Marvin & Michael Dumanis, eds. (Sarabande Books, 2006) ISBN 978-1932511291 ["swarm", etc.]
- Isn't It Romantic: 100 Love Poems by Younger American Poets, Brett Fletcher Lauer & Aimee Kelley, eds. (Wave Books, 2004) ISBN 978-0974635316
- The Future Dictionary of America, Dave Eggers, ed. (McSweeney's Books, 2004), ISBN 978-1932416206 ["jubilee","homeless","pokey","maximum wage"]
- Poetry 180: A Turning Back to Poetry, Billy Collins, ed. (Random House, 2003) ISBN 978-0812968873 ["Cartoon Physics, part 1"]
- Sweet Jesus: Poems about the Ultimate Icon, Nick Carbo & Denise Duhamel, eds. (Anthology Press, 2002) ISBN 978-0972055901 ["Emptying Town"]
- The New American Poets, Michael Collier, ed. (Breadloaf, 2000) ISBN 978-0874519648
- American Poetry: The Next Generation, Gerard Constanzo & Jim Daniels, eds. (Carnegie Mellon, 2000) ISBN 978-0887483431

== Filmography ==
- I Am a Town (2020), writer (title poem, "I Am a Town")
- Ash: The Art of Wayne Gilbert (2017), actor (self)
- After Adderall (2016), actor (self)
- Being Flynn (2011), executive producer and artistic collaborator
- A Short History of Decay (2013), actor (self)
- Bad Writing (2010), actor (self)
- Darwin's Nightmare (2004), artistic collaborator and field poet
- Breathe In, Breathe Out (2001), actor (self)
