= Lupita Tovar =

Mexican-American actress (1910–2016)

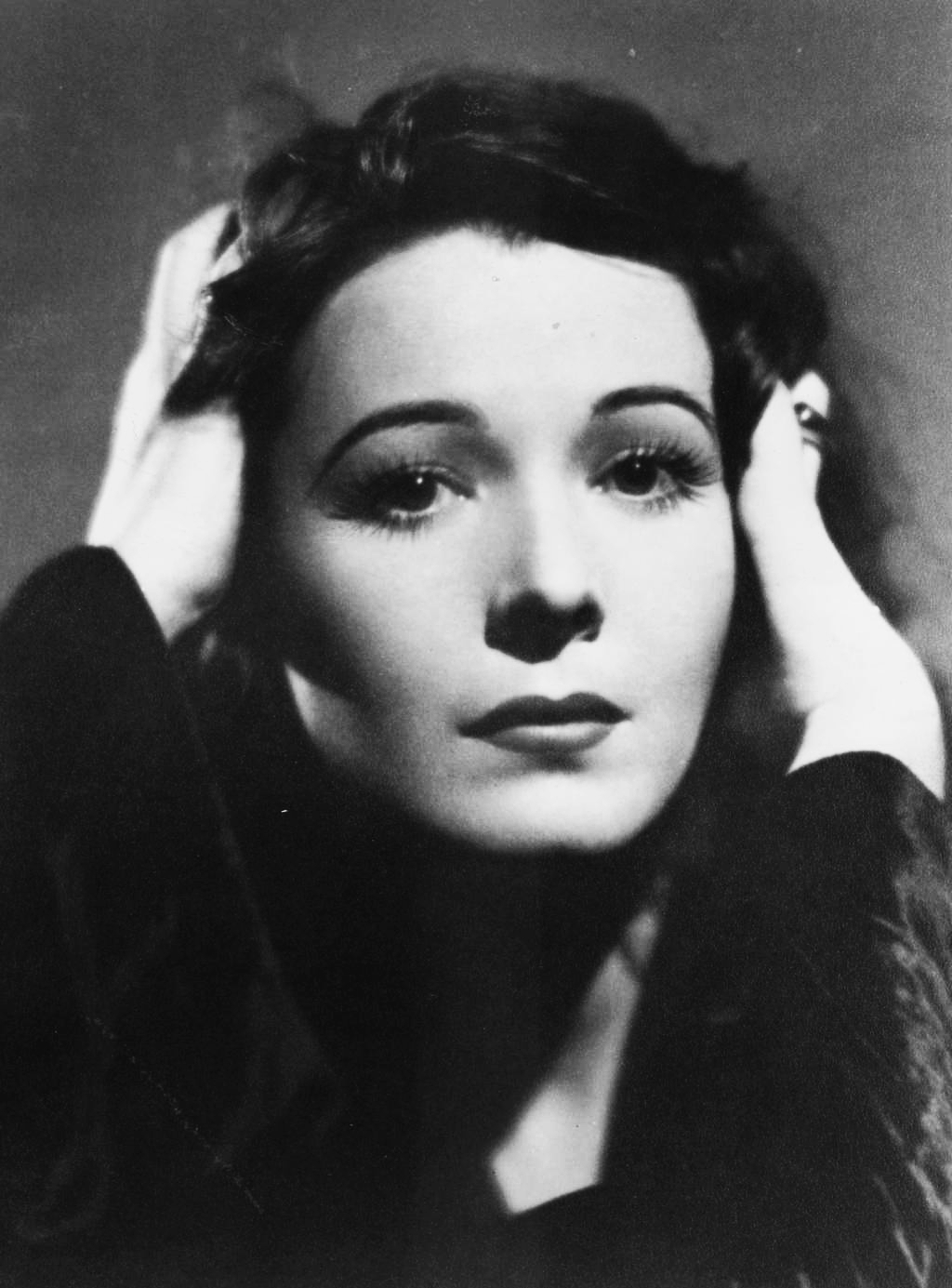
- Lupita Tovar, c. 1940s
- Born: Guadalupe Natalia Tovar Sullivan; 27 July 1910; Matías Romero, Oaxaca, Mexico
- Died: 12 November 2016 (aged 106); Los Angeles, California, U.S.
- Resting place: Hillside Memorial Park Cemetery
- Other name: Lupita Kohner
- Occupation: Actress
- Years active: 1929–1945
- Notable work: Drácula; Santa
- Spouse: Paul Kohner (m. 1932; died 1988)
- Children: 2; including Susan Kohner
- Relatives: Frederick Kohner (brother‑in‑law); John Weitz (son-in-law); Paul Weitz (grandson); Chris Weitz (grandson)

Guadalupe Natalia Tovar Sullivan (27 July 1910 – 12 November 2016), known professionally as Lupita Tovar, was a Mexican-American actress. She is best known for her starring role in the 1931 Spanish-language version of Drácula, filmed in Los Angeles by Universal Pictures at night using the same sets as the Bela Lugosi version, but with a different cast and director; and her leading-lady role in the British-made Buster Keaton feature The Invader (1935, released in the United States as An Old Spanish Custom).

Tovar also starred in the film Santa (1932), one of the first Mexican sound films, and one of the first commercial Spanish-language sound films. After dying at the age of 106 in 2016, she was recorded as the oldest Mexican actress, before being surpassed in 2026 by Dolores Muñoz Ledo, who died at 107.

== Early life ==
Tovar was born in Matías Romero, Oaxaca, Mexico, the daughter of Egidio Tovar, who was from Tehuacán, Puebla, Mexico, and Mary Tovar (née Sullivan), who was Irish-Mexican, from Matías Romero, Oaxaca, Mexico. Tovar was the oldest of nine children, and many of her siblings did not survive early childhood. Tovar grew up during the time of the Mexican Revolution and her family was very poor. She was raised in a very religious Catholic environment, and went to a Catholic school where she was taught by nuns.

In 1918, Tovar's family moved north to Mexico City, where her father worked for the National Railroad of Mexico in an administrative position.

== Career ==
=== Early career ===
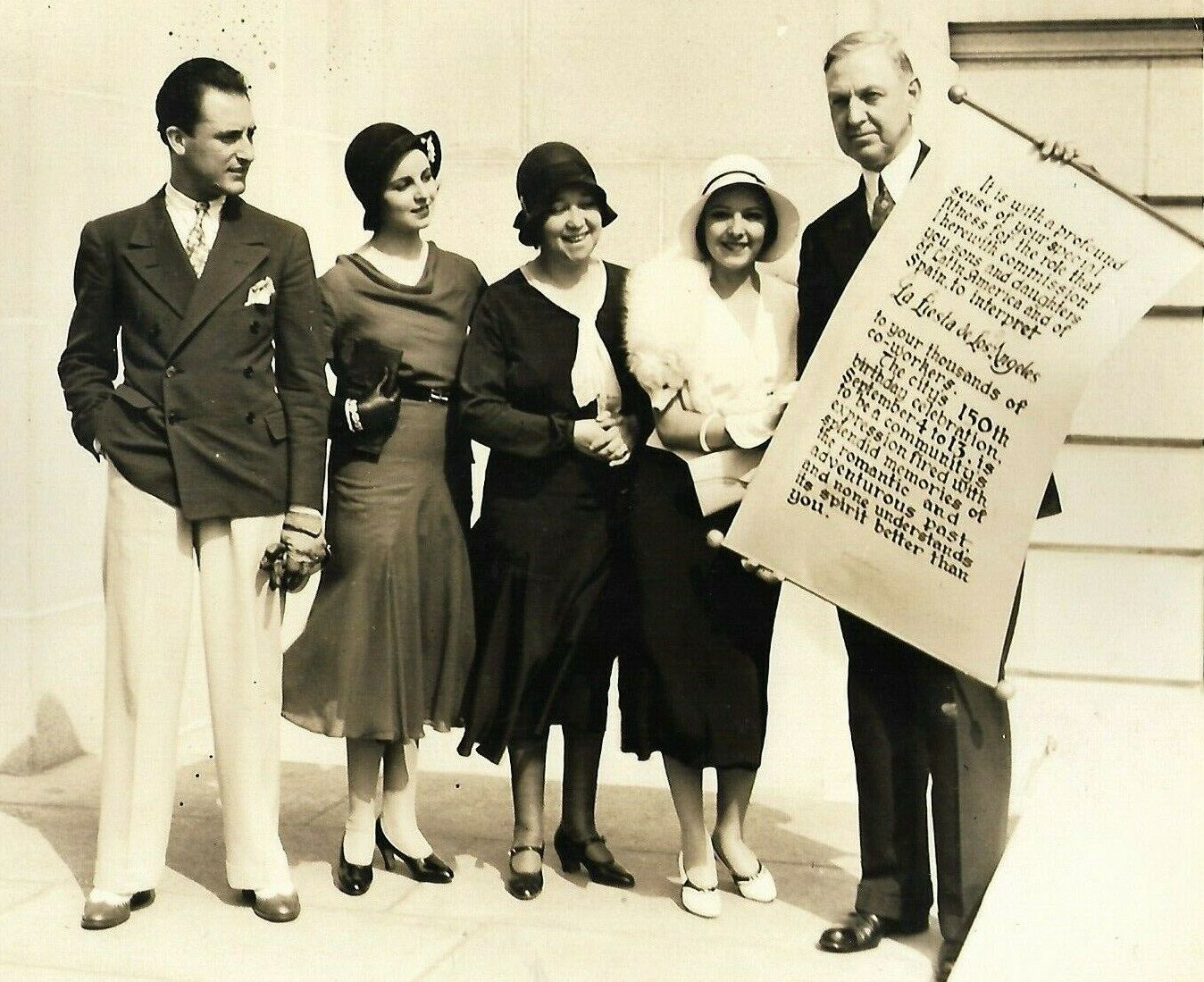
Tovar and Spanish actor and actresses José Crespo, Virginia Ruiz, and María Calvo receiving a commemorative scroll of the 150th anniversary of the founding of Los Angeles, dedicated to them by Mayor Porter, c. 1920s

Tovar was discovered in Mexico City by documentary filmmaker Robert Flaherty. She had performed in a dance class and was invited, along with other girls, to do a screen test as part of a competition. Tovar won first place.

The prize was a 6-month probation period, followed by a 7-year contract at $150/week, to Fox Studios. The studio had realized they could make money by simultaneously shooting Spanish-language movies of English-language studio productions, so had been casting for Spanish-speaking stars. At the age of 18, Tovar moved to Hollywood in November 1928 with her maternal grandmother, Lucy Sullivan.

Under contract, Tovar was required to study intensively to enhance her skills for films. Her weekly schedule included guitar, two hours four days; Spanish dances, one hour three days; dramatics, one-half hour two days; and English, one hour every day. Her accent was considered an asset in talking motion pictures. Her English improved significantly in seven months from the time she arrived in Hollywood in January 1929. At that time, she could not say "good morning" in English. She also attended talkies to improve her English; she also read voraciously to learn new words. In 1929, Tovar appeared in the films The Veiled Woman with Bela Lugosi (now thought to be a lost film) and The Cock-Eyed World.

In 1930, she was mentioned for leads in two talkies starring Douglas Fairbanks Sr. and Richard Barthelmess. Fairbanks put off the filming of what became The Exile. After his death, the film was made in 1947 by his son, Douglas, Jr., directed by Max Ophüls.

=== Spanish-language remakes ===
Lupita's future husband, producer Paul Kohner, convinced Carl Laemmle to make Spanish-language movies that could be shot simultaneously at night with production of English originals during the day. When sound films began to dominate the industry, casting director Jimmy Ryan warned Tovar that her English was not good enough and her option would not be picked up.

But he recommended that she pursue work in the foreign film department. She went to the office but did not get to speak to anyone about work. She left early because a man staring at her made her feel uncomfortable. When she returned to the office another day, she met the head of the department, Kohner. He was the one transfixed by her before. He offered her a job making $15 a day to dub films in Spanish, her first being The King of Jazz.

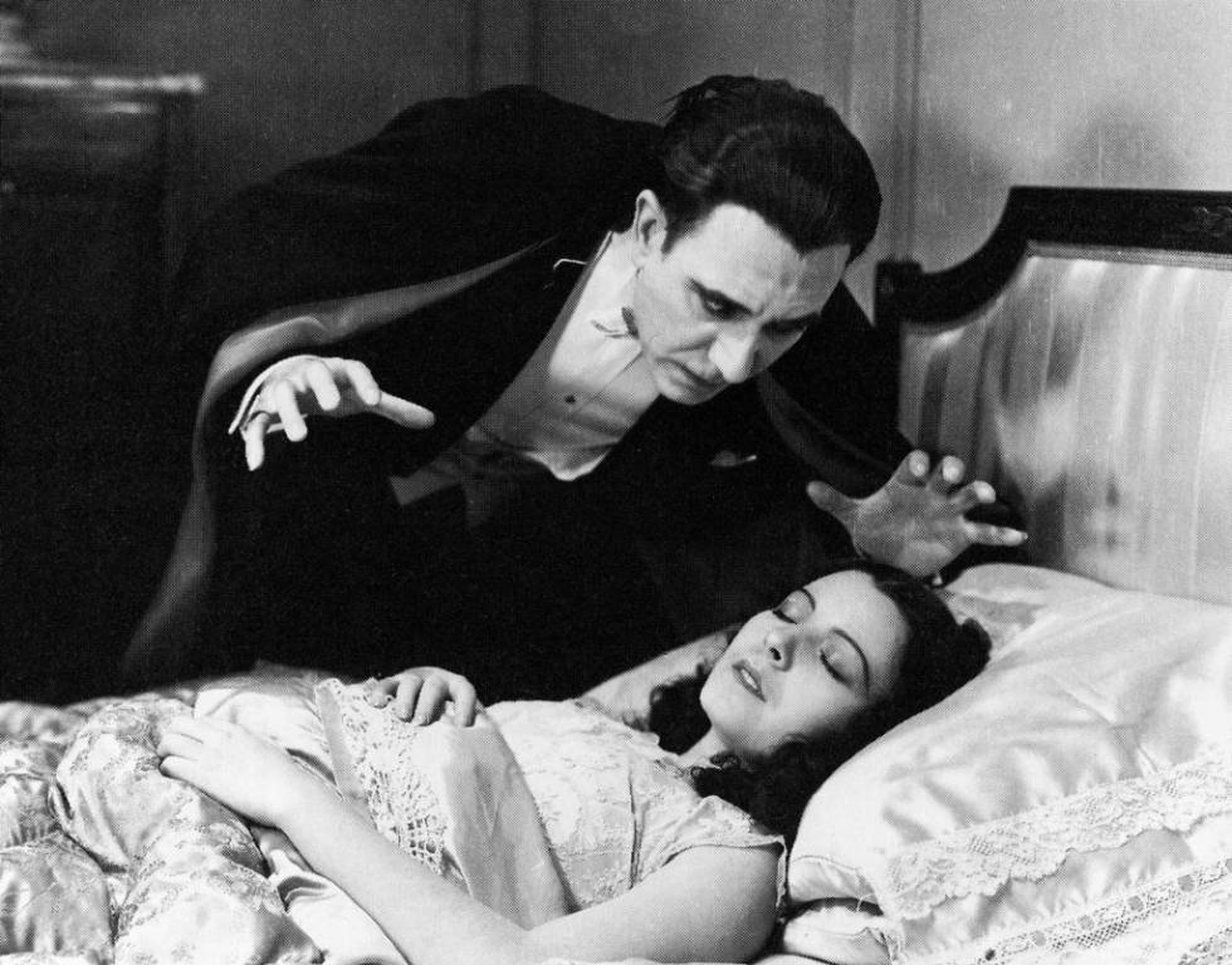
Tovar and Carlos Villarías in Dracula (1931)

In 1930, Tovar starred opposite Antonio Moreno in La Voluntad del Muerto, the Spanish-language version of The Cat Creeps. It was based on the John Willard mystery play, The Cat and the Canary. Both The Cat Creeps and La Voluntad del muerto were remakes of The Cat and the Canary (1927). Casting was done in July 1930 with the film being released later the same year. The Spanish version was directed by George Melford and, like the Spanish-language version of Dracula (1931), was filmed at night using the same sets as those used for filming the English-language version during the day.

Tovar shot Drácula, in 1930, when she was 20 years old. The film was produced by Paul Kohner. The couple soon married.

=== Santa ===
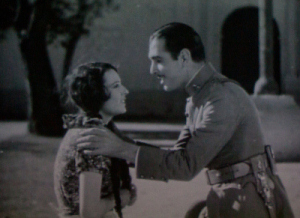
Tovar and Donald Reed in Santa (1932)

In 1932, Tovar starred in the film Santa, the first to have synchronized sound and image on the same celluloid strip.

The film was based on a famous book featuring an innocent girl from the country who has an affair with a soldier and later is abandoned, becoming a prostitute to survive. Santa was such a hit that the Mexican government issued a postage stamp featuring Tovar as Santa. "I tell you I could not walk on the streets when Santa came out," Tovar said. "People tore my dress for souvenirs. It was something."

In 2006, Santa was shown in a celebratory screening by the Academy of Motion Picture Arts and Sciences called "A Salute to Lupita Tovar". The event also featured a conversation between Tovar and film historian Bob Dickson.

=== Other films ===
In 1931, Melford directed Tovar in another Universal picture, East of Borneo, which starred Rose Hobart. Tovar also worked on films at Columbia Pictures.

In 1935 she co-starred opposite Buster Keaton in The Invader, filmed in England. It is better known by its American title, An Old Spanish Custom.

== Personal life ==
Tovar went by the nickname Lupita from the time she was a child.

During the filming of Santa in Mexico, producer Paul Kohner had to return to Europe because his father was sick. It was this separation, and another the next year when Kohner was producing a film for Universal in Europe, that made Tovar realize she loved Kohner. Kohner proposed by telephone, and Tovar went to Czechoslovakia to meet him. They were married in Czechoslovakia on October 30, 1932, by a rabbi in a ceremony at Kohner's parents' home.

In 1936 the couple had a daughter, Susan Kohner, who became a film and television actress. In 1939, they had a son, Paul Julius "Pancho" Kohner Jr., who became a director and producer. Their grandsons, Chris and Paul Weitz, are successful film directors.

Tovar owned a bassinette that she loaned to friends in New York who had children after her: including Julie Baumgold, a writer and her husband Edward Kosner, publisher of New York; Elizabeth Sobieski, a novelist; Judy Licht, a TV newswoman, and her husband Jerry Della Femina, an advertising executive.

In the early 1990s, the release of the Spanish-language Drácula on home video sparked a revival of interest in Tovar's films. She said,

"It's like a dream being invited to all of these festivals and showings of my films. Was that really me up there on the screen? I had almost forgotten I was an actress. It has been absolutely wonderful how people have been so nice. Usually people die and then they get the award, but to be alive and receive this honor is fantastic!"

== Death ==
Tovar died at the age of 106 on 12 November 2016 in Los Angeles of heart disease, just one day after her daughter Susan Kohner's 80th birthday.

== Awards ==
- 2001: Academia Mexicana de Artes y Ciencias Cinematográficas (Mexican Academy of Arts and Sciences), Lifetime Achievement Award at the XLIII Ceremonia de Entrega del Arielrecibió el Ariel de Oro

== Filmography ==
=== Features ===
| Year | Title | Role | Notes |
|---|---|---|---|
| 1929 | The Veiled Woman | Young girl | United States |
| 1929 | Joy Street | | United States |
| 1929 | The Cock-Eyed World | Minor Role | Uncredited |
| 1929 | The Black Watch | Minor Role | Uncredited |
| 1930 | King of Jazz | Emcee's Assistant | Spanish version |
| 1930 | La Voluntad del Muerto | Anita | Spanish-language version of The Cat Creeps |
| 1931 | Estamos en París | | Short |
| 1931 | Drácula | Eva | Spanish-language version of Dracula |
| 1931 | Carne de Cabaret | Dorothy O'Neil | Spanish version of Ten Cents a Dance |
| 1931 | Yankee Don | Juanita | United States |
| 1931 | El Tenorio del Harem | Fátima | |
| 1931 | East of Borneo | Neila | United States |
| 1931 | Border Law | Tonita | |
| 1932 | Santa | Santa | Mexican |
| 1934 | Vidas Rotas | Inca | Spanish |
| 1935 | Broken Lives | Marcela | Spanish |
| 1935 | Alas Sobre del Chaco | Teresa | Spanish-language version of Storm Over the Andes |
| 1935 | The Invader (also known as An Old Spanish Custom) | Lupita Melez | British |
| 1936 | Mariguana | Irene Heredia | Mexican |
| 1936 | El Capitán Tormenta | Magda | Spanish-language version of Captain Calamity |
| 1938 | Blockade | Cabaret Girl | United States |
| 1938 | El Rosario de Amozoc | Rosario | Mexican |
| 1938 | María | María | Mexican |
| 1939 | The Fighting Gringo | Anita "Nita" del Campo | United States |
| 1939 | Tropic Fury | Maria Scipio | United States |
| 1939 | South of the Border | Dolores Mendoza | United States |
| 1940 | Green Hell | Native Girl | United States |
| 1940 | The Westerner | Teresita | United States (uncredited) |
| 1941 | Two Gun Sheriff | Nita | United States |
| 1943 | Resurrección | María | Mexican |
| 1944 | Gun to Gun | Dolores Diego | United States, short subject |
| 1944 | Miguel Strogoff (El Correo del Zar) | Nadia Fedorova | Mexican |
| 1945 | The Crime Doctor's Courage | Dolores Bragga | United States (final film role) |

=== Television ===
| Year | Title | Role | Notes |
|---|---|---|---|
| 1952 | Invitation Playhouse: Mind Over Murder | | Episode: "Winner Take Nothing"; final appearance |
| 1998 | Universal Horror | Interviewee | TV Movie documentary |
