= Dolores Muñoz Ledo =

Mexican voice actress (1918–2026)

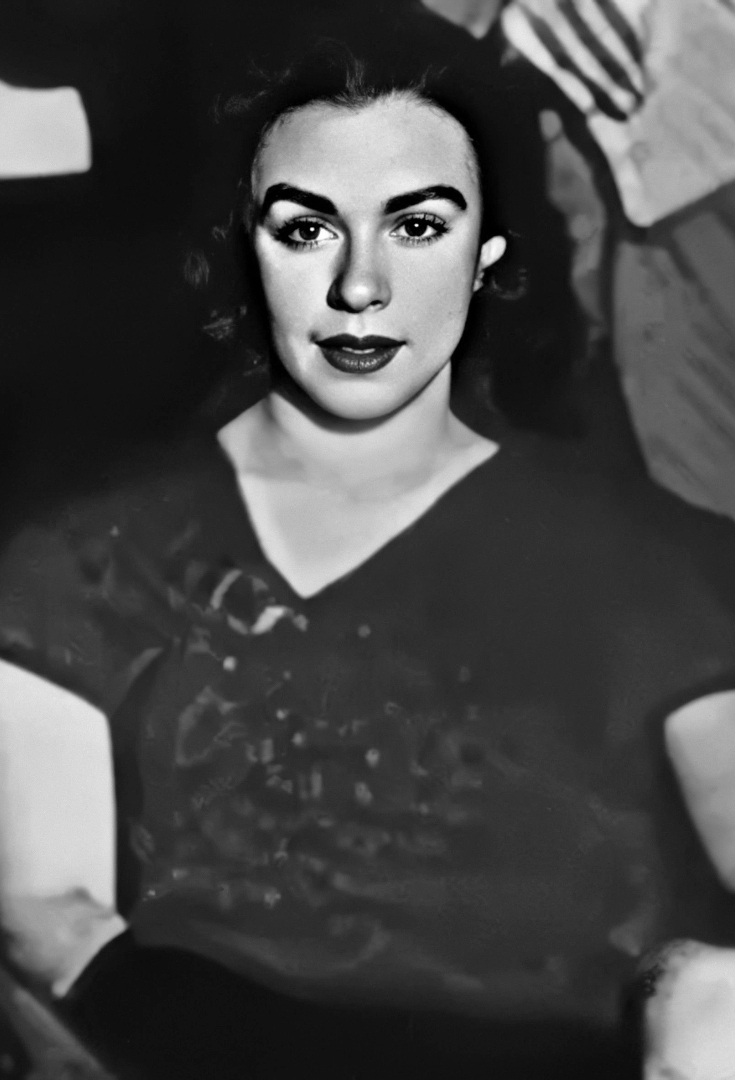
- Muñoz Ledo in 1944
- Born: María Dolores Muñoz Ledo Ortega; 14 April 1918; Mexico City, Mexico
- Died: 13 February 2026 (aged 107); Mexico City, Mexico
- Occupation: Voice actress
- Years active: 1944–1992
- Spouse: Luis Rodríguez del Río
- Children: 2

María Dolores Muñoz Ledo Ortega (14 April 1918 – 13 February 2026) was a Mexican voice actress and semi-supercentenarian. Upon her death at age 107, she holds the record for having been the oldest Mexican actress, and the oldest in the dubbing industry worldwide.

== Life and career ==
Muñoz Ledo was born in Mexico City on 14 April 1918. In 1944, alongside her sister Rosario Muñoz Ledo, she was hired by Metro-Goldwyn-Mayer in New York City.

Her notable roles include being the Latin American voice of Chip in Chip 'n' Dale: Rescue Rangers, Sorceress in He-Man and the Masters of the Universe, Anita Louise in Marie Antoinette (1938), Donna Reed in They Were Expendable (1945), Bea Arthur in The Golden Girls (1989–1992; seasons 5 to 7), among others.

Muñoz Ledo died on 13 February 2026, at the age of 107, establishing herself as a semi-supercentenarian from Mexico, becoming the oldest living Mexican actress, surpassing fellow Mexican actress Lupita Tovar, who died in 2016 at the age of 106. She also became the oldest dubbing artist, male or female, worldwide.
