= Being Flynn =

- Theatrical release poster
- Directed by: Paul Weitz
- Written by: Paul Weitz
- Based on: Another Bullshit Night in Suck City by Nick Flynn
- Produced by: Paul Weitz; Andrew Miano; Michael Costigan
- Starring: Robert De Niro; Paul Dano; Olivia Thirlby; Lili Taylor; Wes Studi; Julianne Moore
- Cinematography: Declan Quinn
- Edited by: Joan Sobel
- Music by: Badly Drawn Boy
- Production companies: Depth of Field; Corduroy Films; Tribeca Productions
- Distributed by: Focus Features
- Release date: March 2, 2012
- Running time: 102 minutes
- Country: United States
- Language: English
- Box office: $540,152

Being Flynn is a 2012 American drama film written and directed by Paul Weitz and starring Robert De Niro, Julianne Moore and Paul Dano, released in select theaters in the United States on March 2, 2012. It is based on Another Bullshit Night in Suck City, a 2004 memoir by Nick Flynn.

== Plot ==
Nick Flynn is an aspiring writer who works at a homeless shelter where his estranged father Jonathan stays. Jonathan, an alcoholic ex-con and self-proclaimed "master storyteller", left Nick's mother Jody years earlier to raise Nick on her own. She eventually died by suicide, for which Nick feels responsible.

Jonathan gets into fights with the others, and Nick is tempted to throw him out. Nick and Jonathan get into an intense argument, during which Jonathan tells Nick that they are the same. The stress of seeing his father again drives Nick to drink heavily and abuse drugs, costing him his relationship with his girlfriend and coworker, Denise.

Jonathan eventually gets kicked out of the shelter, with Nick voting with the staff for his removal. Nick tries to numb the guilt by smoking crack, but it only intensifies his pain, and he realizes that he has a problem. He enters a rehabilitation program, and makes amends with Denise.

One night, he finds Jonathan sleeping on the street and invites him to stay with him. When they part ways the next day, Jonathan tells Nick that he is not responsible for his mother's suicide, and that they are not the same after all.

Nick becomes a teacher, starts a family, and publishes a book of his poetry, while Jonathan qualifies for Section 8 housing thanks to Nick's recommendation. Jonathan shows his appreciation by letting Nick read his "masterpiece", Memoirs of a Moron, which Nick finds to be initially promising but ultimately falling short—much like Jonathan himself. He invites Jonathan to his poetry reading, where he introduces his father to his wife and infant daughter. After some hesitation, he allows Jonathan to hold his daughter.

== Cast ==
- Robert De Niro as Jonathan Flynn
- Julianne Moore as Jody Flynn
- Paul Dano as Nick Flynn
- Liam Broggy as Young Nick
- Olivia Thirlby as Denise
- Lili Taylor as Joy
- Dale Dickey as Marie
- Victor Rasuk as Gabriel
- Wes Studi as The Captain
- Katherine Waterston as Sarah
- Billy Wirth as Travis
- Thomas Middleditch as Richard
- Chris Chalk as Ivan

== Reception ==
Being Flynn received mixed reviews. On Rotten Tomatoes, the film has a 49%, based on 81 reviews, with an average rating of 5.83/10. The site's critical consensus reads: "Robert De Niro gives a sincere, gripping performance, but Being Flynn is an uneasy mix of drama and comedy that fails to emotionally resonate as a whole." On Metacritic, the film received a 53% rating, based on 27 reviews, indicating "mixed or average" reviews.

Many critics praised De Niro's performance. Roger Ebert of the Chicago Sun-Times stated that "to summon up his most iconic role must represent De Niro's faith in this film".

Richard Roeper said, "De Niro returns to genius form in Being Flynn."
