= Another Bullshit Night in Suck City =

2004 memoir by Nick Flynn

- Author: Nick Flynn
- Language: English
- Genre: Memoir
- Published: September 2004
- Publisher: Norton
- Publication place: United States
- Awards: 2004 award from PEN International and shortlisted for the Prix Femina

Another Bullshit Night in Suck City is a memoir by playwright and poet Nick Flynn, describing Flynn's reunion with his estranged father, Jonathan, an alcoholic resident of the homeless shelter where Nick was a social worker in the late 1980s. The title refers to Jonathan's description of homeless life in Boston. It was published by W. W. Norton in September 2004.

== Reception ==
Publishers Weekly described it as "biting", and noted that "(a)lthough (the book is) depressing", it is not "hopeless", because Flynn — unlike his father — was able to "write well". At the Guardian, Christopher Priest commended Flynn for the book's "impressionistic, fragmentary" style that "actually seems to capture the banal, confusing mind of a homeless drunkard", but said that despite Flynn's skill, its subject "remains banal, depressing and sordid".

The memoir earned Flynn a 2004 award from PEN International, was shortlisted for the Prix Femina, and has been translated into fifteen languages.

== Film adaptation ==
In 2007, Twentieth Century Fox acquired the rights to produce a movie adaptation of the memoir, Filming began in the summer of 2010 with Paul Weitz as director, and starring Robert De Niro as Jonathan and Paul Dano as Nick. The film, titled Being Flynn, was released on March 2, 2012.

In 2013, W.W. Norton published "The Reenactments", Flynn's memoir about his experiences during the making of the film adaptation.
