= Gun to Gun =

1944 short film

- Directed by: D. Ross Lederman
- Screenplay by: Ed Earl Repp
- Based on: Adiós! 1930 novel by Lanier Bartlett; Virginia Stivers Bartlett
- Produced by: Gordon Hollingshead
- Starring: Robert Shayne; Lupita Tovar; Pedro de Cordoba
- Cinematography: James Van Trees
- Edited by: Doug Gould
- Music by: Howard Jackson
- Distributed by: Warner Bros.
- Release date: January 8, 1944
- Running time: 18 minutes
- Country: United States
- Language: English

Gun to Gun is a 1944 American Warner Bros. Santa Fe Trail short subject romantic western directed by D. Ross Lederman. The film, set on a ranch, stars Robert Shayne, Lupita Tovar and Pedro de Cordoba.

== Plot summary ==
In 1850s Los Angeles, rancher Don Diego is unjustly fined by a corrupt tax commissioner. He dispatches his ward, Steve Randall, to deliver 1,000 cattle as payment. However, Steve uncovers the official's corruption, sparking a violent confrontation where he must bring the outlaws to justice.

== Cast ==
- Robert Shayne as Steve Randall
- Lupita Tovar as Dolores Diego
- Pedro de Cordoba as Don Diego
- Harry Woods as Land Commissioner Harkness
- Anita Camargo as Lupe
