= Yankee Don =

1931 film

- Directed by: Noel M. Smith
- Written by: Madeline Allen; Frances Jackson
- Produced by: Richard Talmadge
- Starring: Richard Talmadge; Lupita Tovar; Julian Rivero
- Production company: Richard Talmadge Productions
- Distributed by: Capitol Film Exchange
- Release date: May 17, 1931
- Running time: 61 minutes
- Country: United States
- Language: English

Yankee Don is a 1931 American Western film directed by Noel M. Smith and starring Richard Talmadge, Lupita Tovar and Julian Rivero.

== Plot ==
Mexican landowner Don Juan hires New Yorker Dick Carsey to oversee construction of a pipeline through Juan's land. Meanwhile, the construction foreman secretly tried to undermine both of them and gain access to the land for himself.

== Cast ==
- Richard Talmadge
- Lupita Tovar
- Julian Rivero
- Sam Appel
- Gayne Whitman
- Alma Real
- Victor Metzetti
