= Beowulf Sheehan =

American photographer (born 1968)

- Sheehan at the 2026 Texas Book Festival
- Born: Theodore Beowulf Sheehan; November 8, 1968 (age 58); Clay County, Missouri, U.S.
- Occupation: Photographer
- Parents: Margitta Gertrude Dorothea; Christopher Michael Sheehan
- Website: www.beowulfsheehan.com

Theodore Beowulf Sheehan (born November 8, 1968) is an American photographer known for portraits of authors, artists, and celebrities.

== Portraits by Beowulf Sheehan ==
=== Author Portraits ===
AUTHOR: The Portraits of Beowulf Sheehan is a collection of portraits of 200 writers from 35 countries; it was published by Black Dog & Leventhal on October 9, 2018. Poets, novelists, and screenwriters photographed by Sheehan include:

- Margaret Atwood
- Giannina Braschi
- Stephen Colbert
- Neil Gaiman
- Toni Morrison
- J.K. Rowling
- Patti Smith
- Zadie Smith
- Salman Rushdie
- Donna Tartt
- Jesmyn Ward
- Oprah Winfrey
- Maria Dahvana Headley
- Cormac McCarthy

=== Visual and Performing Artists ===
- Ai Weiwei
- Bono
- Bill T. Jones
- Steve Martin
- Yoko Ono
- RZA

=== Politicians ===
- Joe Biden

== Early life ==
Born in 1968 in Kansas City, Missouri to a German mother and an American father, Beowulf Sheehan (born Theodore Beowulf Sheehan) was raised in South Florida and spent part of his childhood abroad. Limited in physical activities because of asthma, his early years were spent reading books and learning about art. In high school he photographed Miami Dolphins games and realized his love of the craft.

== Career ==
After studying at New York University and International Center of Photography, Beowulf assisted other photographers while working predominantly in fashion for six years. Later opportunities to photograph the Fashion Biography feature in Vogue Nippon and to photograph the first PEN World Voices of International Literature introduced him to a number of writers, among them Salman Rushdie. Those experiences began a career of photographing figures from arts and culture for publishers, publications, academic and cultural institutions.

Sheehan's photographs have been exhibited at the Dostoevsky Museum, International Center of Photography, Museum of the City of New York, and New-York Historical Society, and have been included in the permanent collections of the American Academy of Arts and Letters, the Brooklyn Academy of Music, the German Consulate General New York, the Museum of Chinese in America, and the Smithsonian National Museum of African American History and Culture. The Author Photo: Portrait Photographer Beowulf Sheehan on a Life Capturing Writers, a short film by Claire Ince and Ancil McKain, was named an official selection of the 2020 Venice Institute of Contemporary Art Fine Arts Film Festival.
