= Charles Martin (author) =

American writer

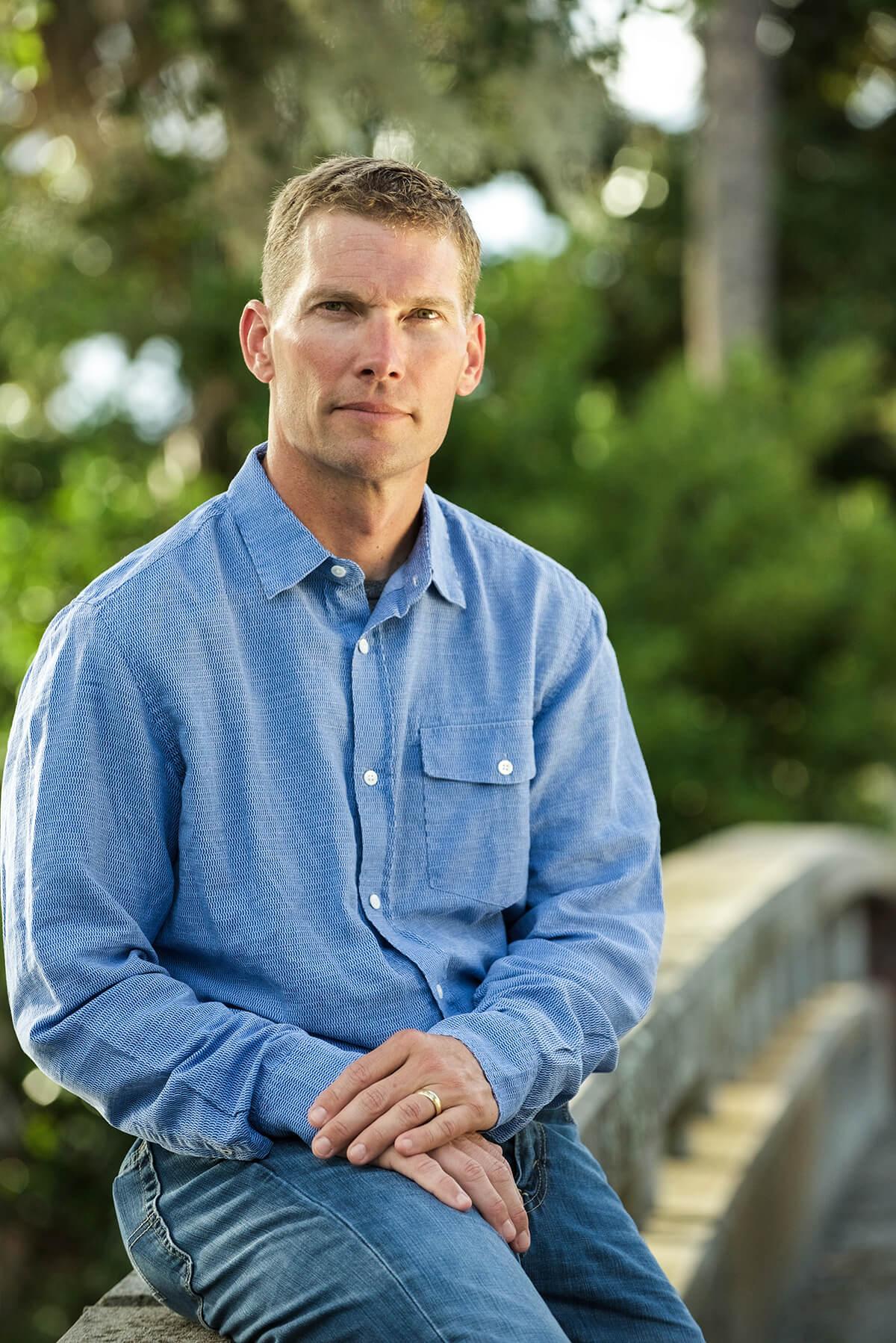
- Image of Charles Martin
- Born: November 3, 1969 (age 56); United States
- Occupation: Novelist
- Writing career
- Genre: Fiction

Charles Martin (born November 3, 1969) is an author from the Southern United States. Martin earned his B.A. in English from Florida State University and went on to receive an M.A. in Journalism and a Ph.D. in Communication from Regent University. He currently lives in Minneapolis, Minnesota with his wife and three sons.

== Works ==
=== Novels ===
Awakening series:

1. The Dead Don't Dance (2004)
2. Maggie (2006)

Murphy Shepard series:

1. The Water Keeper (2020)
2. The Letter Keeper (2021)
3. The Record Keeper (2022)
4. The Keeper (2025)

Stand-alones:

- Wrapped in Rain (2005)
- When Crickets Cry (2006)
- Chasing Fireflies: A Novel of Discovery (2007)
- Where the River Ends (2008)
- The Mountain Between Us (2010)
- Thunder and Rain (2012)
- Unwritten (2013)
- A Life Intercepted (2014)
- Water from My Heart (2015)
- Long Way Gone (2016)
- Send Down the Rain (2018)

=== Non-fiction ===
- River Road (2015), memoirs
- What If It's True?: A Storyteller’s Journey with Jesus (2019), religion
- They Turned the World Upside Down: A Storyteller's Journey with Those Who Dared to Follow Jesus (2021), religion
- If the Tomb Is Empty: Why the Resurrection Means Anything Is Possible (Expected publication 2022), with Joby Martin, religion
- If the Tomb Is Empty Study Guide: Why the Resurrection Means Anything Is Possible (Expected publication 2022), with Joby Martin, religion
- The Reason for Jesus: Why did God the Father ransom you? (2026)

== Adaptations ==
- The Mountain Between Us (2017), film directed by Hany Abu-Assad, based on novel The Mountain Between Us

== Bibliography ==
- Martin, Charles (July 24, 2008). Where the River Ends. Ebury Press. ISBN 978-0-09-192700-4.
