= The Mountain Between Us (film) =

2017 film by Hany Abu-Assad

- Theatrical release poster
- Directed by: Hany Abu-Assad
- Screenplay by: Chris Weitz; J. Mills Goodloe
- Based on: The Mountain Between Us by Charles Martin
- Produced by: Peter Chernin; Dylan Clark; David Ready; Jenno Topping
- Starring: Idris Elba; Kate Winslet; Dermot Mulroney; Beau Bridges
- Cinematography: Mandy Walker
- Edited by: Lee Percy
- Music by: Ramin Djawadi
- Production companies: Chernin Entertainment; Fox 2000 Pictures
- Distributed by: 20th Century Fox
- Release dates: September 9, 2017 (TIFF); October 6, 2017 (United States)
- Running time: 112 minutes
- Country: United States
- Language: English
- Budget: $35 million
- Box office: $62.8 million

The Mountain Between Us is a 2017 American survival drama film directed by Hany Abu-Assad and written by Chris Weitz and J. Mills Goodloe, based on the 2011 novel of the same name by Charles Martin. It stars Idris Elba and Kate Winslet as a surgeon and a journalist, respectively, who survive a plane crash, with a dog, and are stranded in the High Uintas Wilderness with injuries and harsh weather conditions.

The film premiered on September 9, 2017, at the 2017 Toronto International Film Festival, and was theatrically released in the United States on October 6, 2017, by 20th Century Fox. It received negative to mixed reviews from critics and grossed $62 million against its $35 million budget.

== Plot ==
After their flight is canceled due to stormy weather, neurosurgeon Dr. Ben Bass and photojournalist Alex Martin hire private pilot Walter to get them from Idaho to Denver for connecting flights to Alex's wedding in New York and Ben's emergency surgery appointment in Baltimore. Walter, who has not filed a flight plan, suffers a fatal stroke mid-flight, and the plane crashes on a mountaintop in the High Uintas Wilderness. Ben, Alex, and Walter's Labrador Retriever survive the crash, but Alex's leg is badly injured. Ben attends to her cuts and injured knee, and buries the pilot while she is unconscious.

Once conscious, Alex thinks Ben has a better chance of finding help if he leaves her behind, but Ben refuses. Stranded for days with dwindling supplies, Alex grows skeptical that they will be rescued, although Ben wants to wait for help with the plane's wreckage. He agrees to climb a ridge to see if there is any sign of a road, but sees nothing but mountains and narrowly avoids falling down the side.

Alex goes through Ben's things and listens to a message from his wife saying, 'I'm glad to have had this time with you'. Alex is found by a cougar, which viciously fights and wounds the dog. She shoots a flare at the big cat, killing it. Ben comes back and tends to the dog's wounds.

The two argue whether to wait for rescue or descend the mountain to find help or a phone signal. Alex starts a lone descent down the mountain. Ben catches up; having located the tail end of the plane, he finds a beacon, but it is smashed. The two hike down to the treeline and spend the night in a cave.

Using her telephoto lens, Alex thinks she sees a cabin. At the same time that Alex falls into freezing water, Ben comes across the empty cabin. He pulls her out, but she remains unconscious and severely dehydrated. Ben again saves her life by improvising an IV. They stay there for several days while Alex recovers; Ben reveals that his wife died two years prior from a brain tumor. Eventually, they have sex. As he sleeps, Alex takes his picture. Later, she again tells Ben to leave her behind to find help. Ben initially agrees but soon returns; they press forward again.

The dog alerts them to a nearby timber yard. On their way toward it, Ben's leg gets caught in a bear trap. Alex cannot free him, but she reaches the yard and collapses in front of an approaching truck. Ben awakens in a hospital and goes to Alex's room, where he finds her with Mark, her fiancé. After a brief conversation, Ben leaves, heartbroken.

Ben and Alex go their separate ways after the hospital, with Ben keeping the dog. Alex tries calling Ben, but he ignores her calls until she sends him photos she took on the mountain, writing that only he can understand them. This encourages Ben to call Alex. They meet at a restaurant in New York, where it is revealed that Alex is now a part-time teacher, and Ben is a consultant at trauma clinics in London because his frostbitten hands will not recover sufficiently for him to perform surgery again. Ben says he did not call Alex because he thought she had married; Alex says she could not go through with it because she had fallen in love with Ben. Outside the restaurant, Ben admits to Alex that they survived because they fell in love. Alex dismisses her feelings and reminds Ben of something he said on the mountain: "the heart is just a muscle." She tells him she does not know how they could be together in the real world. They hug goodbye, and begin to depart in opposite directions. While walking away both become distraught, and finally turn and begin running back to each other. A split second before the two embrace, the screen cuts to black and the credits roll.

== Cast ==
- Idris Elba as Dr. Ben Bass, a neurosurgeon
- Kate Winslet as Alex Martin, a photojournalist
- Dermot Mulroney as Mark Robertson, Alex's fiancé
- Beau Bridges as Walter, the pilot of the charter plane
- Raleigh and Austin as Walter's dog

== Production ==
=== Development ===
The project was first in development in January 2012, with Mexican director Gerardo Naranjo set to direct from a script by J. Mills Goodloe. In August 2012, Scott Frank was hired to re-write the script. In November 2014, Hany Abu-Assad replaced Naranjo, and Chris Weitz was later hired to re-write the script.

Abu-Assad has said of the film, "I really didn’t see an epic love story against the background of survival, I think optimism and hope is crucial to survive. And to go on with your life even if you’ve had a lot of bad luck. So if you give (in) to the bad luck, you will die. (But) if you fight the bad luck, you have a better chance to survive and make your life better. This is very simple wisdom, yes? But still very crucial especially in these kind of days, when everybody feels entitled to their good luck."

=== Casting ===
The film went through several lead casting changes. In March 2012, it was announced that Michael Fassbender would star as Bass, but by September 2014, Fassbender dropped out due to a scheduling conflict, and Charlie Hunnam replaced him. Margot Robbie also came on board to star as Alex. In November 2014, Robbie dropped out of the project, and Rosamund Pike entered negotiations for the lead role. In December 2015, both Hunnam and Pike dropped out.

In February 2016, Idris Elba came on board, followed by Kate Winslet in June 2016. Dermot Mulroney joined the cast as Winslet's character's fiancé in early February 2017.

=== Filming ===
Principal photography started on December 5, 2016, in Vancouver, and continued until February 24, 2017. Elba and Winslet filmed scenes at the Vancouver International Airport and Abbotsford International Airport on December 7, 2016. Filming stopped for Christmas holidays, from December 20, 2016, to January 3, 2017.

Filming resumed around Invermere and Panorama Mountain Village on January 4, 2017.

Most of the filming took place in Canada, on the border of Alberta and British Columbia. Abu-Assad has described the locations as having very cold temperatures, and tough and harsh filming conditions. Many scenes were shot on a mountaintop, and he and the crew had to drive 40 minutes before reaching the film's base camp. When the weather was okay, they could board the helicopter to reach their destination along with their supplies.

=== Music ===
German-Iranian composer Ramin Djawadi composed & conducted the music for the film. The official trailer for the movie was released with "Dusk Till Dawn" by Zayn Malik and Sia as the soundtrack. The score from the film is now released at Lakeshore Records. Soundtrackdreams reviewed, 'The main theme from “The mountain between us” is the best advertisement for this score; a sweeping piano and violin theme, both grandiose and intimate at the same time, a proper dramatic opening that gets emotional from the first minutes without an adjustment period. The first cue is the kind of piece that could have very well sat at the end as the dramatic climax of the movie. The horn buildup towards the end joins the rolling piano in making sure this theme will end up as one of the most memorable he has ever written.'

== Release ==
The film premiered at the 2017 Toronto International Film Festival, on September 9, 2017. The film was initially set for release in the United States on October 20, 2017 but was later moved up to October 6, 2017.

== Reception ==
=== Box office ===
As of December 21, 2017, The Mountain Between Us had grossed $30.3 million in the United States and Canada, and $30.7 million in other territories, for a worldwide total of $62.3 million, against a production budget of $35 million.

In the United States and Canada, the film was released alongside Blade Runner 2049 and My Little Pony: The Movie, and was expected to gross $11–12 million from 3,088 theaters in its opening weekend. It ended up debuting to $10.1 million, finishing second at the box office, behind Blade Runner 2049 ($32.5 million). The film dropped 47% in its second weekend, making $5.7 million and falling to 5th.

=== Critical response ===
On the review aggregator website Rotten Tomatoes, 39% of 174 critics' reviews are positive, with an average rating of 5.1/10. The website's consensus reads: "The Mountain Between Us may be too far-fetched for some viewers to appreciate, but it's elevated by reliably engaging performances from Idris Elba and Kate Winslet." Metacritic, which uses a weighted average, assigned the film a score of 48 out of 100, based on 37 critics, indicating "mixed or average" reviews. Audiences polled by CinemaScore gave the film an average grade of "A−" on an A+ to F scale.

Jordan Mintzer of The Hollywood Reporter described the film as "an easily digestible love story-cum-survival tale that tosses two excellent actors in the snow and lets them do their thing," before concluding that "what really helps Mountain overcome its far-fetched scenario is the pairing of Winslet and Elba, who know how to turn up the charm tenfold yet make Alex and Ben seem (mostly) like real people." Tim Grierson of ScreenDaily noted that the film "struggles to balance its life-or-death stakes with its far more florid love story," but added that "the considerable chemistry between Kate Winslet and Idris Elba certainly helps sell this tearjerker."

In his review for Variety, Peter Debruge described it as "a movie in which neither the subzero temperature nor the romantic heat penetrates more than skin deep." Also criticizing the film, Steve Pond of TheWrap found it unnecessarily lengthy and said that "a love story cheapens the grand survival story." Ignatiy Vishnevetsky of The A.V. Club criticized the central characters as "a couple of one-note personality-test types" with "zero romantic chemistry," and wrote that the script "actually tones down the howling outrageousness of Martin’s novel, which seems to miss the point. But, structurally, it’s the same junk. Problems pop out of nowhere and resolve themselves, while torturous motivations attempt to explain why characters would withhold basic information from one another for weeks..."
