= Santa (1932 film) =

1932 Mexican film by Antonio Moreno

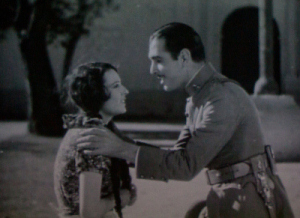
- Lupita Tovar and Donald Reed in Santa
- Directed by: Antonio Moreno
- Written by: Carlos Noriega Hope
- Produced by: Compañía Nacional Productora de Películas, Gustavo Sáenz de Sicilia
- Starring: Lupita Tovar; Carlos Orellana; Juan José Martínez Casado; Donald Reed; Antonio R. Frausto; Mimí Derba
- Cinematography: Alex Phillips
- Music by: Agustín Lara
- Distributed by: Compañía Nacional Productora de Películas
- Release date: 30 March 1932
- Running time: 81 minutes
- Country: Mexico
- Language: Spanish

Santa (1932) is the first Mexican narrative sound film. It was directed by Antonio Moreno and starred Lupita Tovar, based on the novel of the same name by Federico Gamboa. It had its world premiere in San Antonio. In 1994, the Mexican magazine Somos published their list of "The 100 best movies of the cinema of Mexico" in its 100th edition and named Santa its 67th choice.

== Plot ==
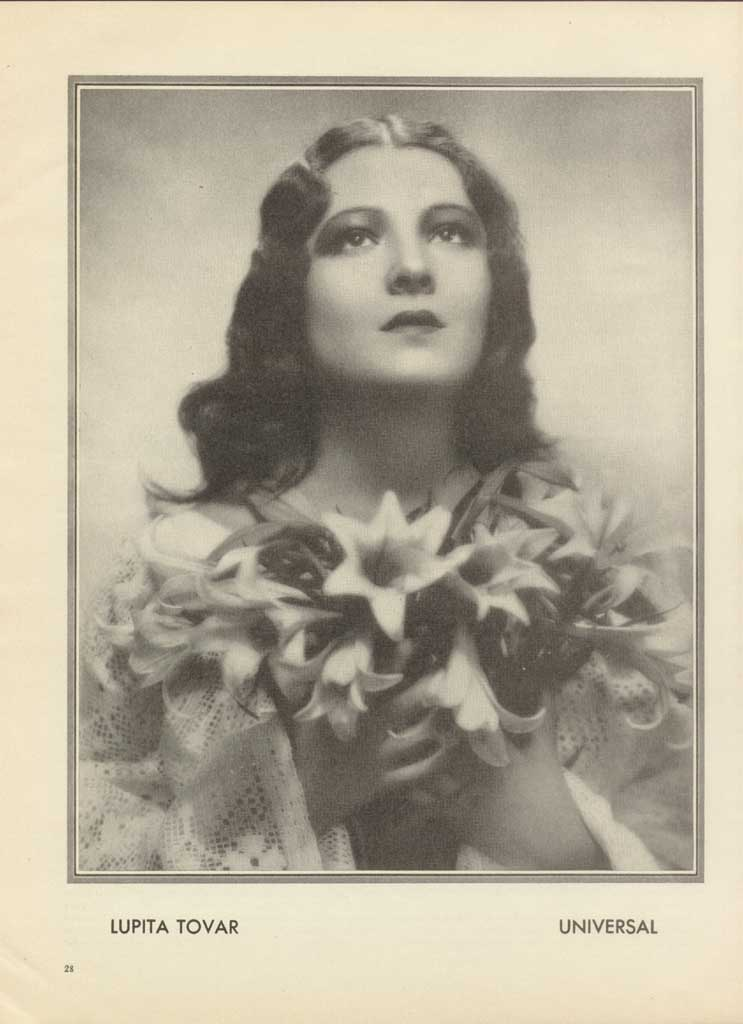
Film star Lupita Tovar

A Mexican girl named Santa (Tovar) is seduced and abandoned by a soldier, Marcelino. Rejected by her family and friends, she finds shelter in a brothel in Mexico City. After meeting Santa, the blind piano player Hipólito (Orellana) falls in love with her but is ridiculed by those around him. After she is rejected by her romantic partner Jarameno (due to the meddling of a suddenly returned Marcelino), Hipólito invites Santa to live with him and they attend church together. Later Santa becomes ill and Hipólito goes to the hospital to be with her but she passes away.

== Cast ==
- Lupita Tovar as Santa
- Carlos Orellana as Hipólito
- Juan José Martínez Casado as Jarameño
- Donald Reed as Marcelino
- Antonio R. Frausto as Fabián
- Mimí Derba as Doña Elvira
- Rosita Arriaga as Santa's Mother
- Joaquín Busquets as Esteban
- Feliciano Rueda as Drunk at brothel
- Jorge Peón as Genarillo
- Alberto Martí as Jarameño's friend
- Ricardo Carti as Doctor
- Sofía Álvarez as Prostitute 1
- Rosa Castro as Prostitute 2
- Nena Betancourt as Singer
