= The Mountain Between Us (novel) =

Romance-disaster novel by Charles Martin

- Cover of first edition
- Author: Charles Martin
- Genre: Romance, Disaster
- Publisher: Broadway Books
- Publication date: June 1, 2010
- Publication place: United States
- Media type: Print (hardcover)
- Pages: 336 pp (first edition)
- ISBN: 978-0767927024

The Mountain Between Us is a romance-disaster novel, written by American author Charles Martin. The story focuses on Dr. Ben Payne and writer Ashley Knox as they get stranded in the High Uintas Wilderness after a plane crash.

The novel was published by Broadway Books on June 1, 2010. A film adaptation starring Idris Elba and Kate Winslet was released on October 6, 2017.

== Plot ==
On a stormy winter night, Dr. Ben Payne and writer Ashley Knox are stuck in Salt Lake City International Airport when their flights are canceled. Both are eager to reach their destinations—Ben has patients waiting, and Ashley is to be married the following day. Ben charters a Scout, a single-engine bush plane, to fly him over the mountains to Denver and offers Ashley a seat. Soon they are airborne over the mountains, but their pilot suffers a fatal stroke in flight and the plane crashes, leaving them stranded in the High Uintas Wilderness.

Though they survive the impact with injuries (Ben has broken ribs and Ashley suffers a terrible leg fracture), they are faced with harsh weather conditions and the fact that no one knows they are missing. The ordeal leads them to depend on one other for survival as they try to find an inhabited area, and ultimately brings them closer.

== Reception ==
Terry Miller Shannon, writing in The Book Report, called it "not only a page-turner of an adventure story; there is a moving emotional counterpart to the physical journey these characters undertake."

== Adaptation ==
20th Century Fox adapted the novel into a feature film, with Hany Abu-Assad directing. Kate Winslet and Idris Elba played the lead roles. The film premiered on September 9, 2017, at the 2017 Toronto International Film Festival, and was theatrically released in the United States on October 6, 2017, by 20th Century Fox.

In the film, Winslet's character's name was changed from Ashley Knox to Alex Martin, and Elba's character's surname from Payne to Bass. Also in the film, Winslet's character's occupation was changed to a traveling photographer/journalist and Elba's character's occupation was changed to a brain surgeon at first, then after the rescue, switched to being a general doctor. For the plot in the film, Winslet's character hires the charter plane instead of Dr. Ben in the original book.
