= List of films in the public domain in the United States =

Most films are subject to copyright, but those listed here are believed to be in the public domain in the United States. This means that no government, organization, or individual owns any copyright over the work, and as such it is common property. Films in this list may incorporate elements from other works that are still under copyright, even though the film itself is out of copyright.

== Copyrightable elements of a film ==
There is no official list of films (or other works) in the public domain. It is difficult to determine the public domain status of a film because it can incorporate any or all of the following copyrightable elements:

- Cinematography
- Drama
- Literature
- Music
- Art
- Graphical characters (e.g., Bugs Bunny)
- Fictional characters (e.g., James Bond)

Film copyright involves the copyright status of multiple elements that make up the film. A film can lose its copyright in some of those elements while retaining copyright in other elements. Experts in the field of public domain sometimes differ in their opinions as to whether a particular film is in the public domain.

The use of music in a film can cause uncertainty with regard to copyright. As of 2010, it is not known whether the use of music in a film constitutes publication of the music for the purpose of copyright. Unpublished works are treated differently from published works under US copyright law.

== Judicial interpretation of public domain ==
Judges, too, differ in their interpretation of the laws governing copyright protection. The United States is a "patchwork quilt" of inconsistent copyright rules in different federal judicial districts. The courts of one jurisdiction are not obliged to follow the decisions of another. The Supreme Court of the United States (which could resolve those inconsistencies) very seldom decides copyright cases, and then only when an important principle is involved.

== Documenting public domain status ==
If a film appears on the list below, there is a high probability it has lost some or all of its United States copyright protection or, in the case of U.S. government films, was never protected by copyright.

There is no single method for determining if a film, or parts of it, is in the public domain. There are several methods that can be used to document a film's public domain status. These include the following:

=== Determining copyright registration ===
Motion picture copyright registrations prior to 1978 were published in semi-annual Copyright Catalogs. The Library of Congress also published cumulative Copyright Catalogs of motion picture registrations for the periods, which all are out of print.

- 1894–1911
- 1912–1939
- 1940–1949
- 1950–1959
- 1960–1969
- 1970–1979
- 1980–1989

However, the Film Superlist series is a complete reprint of all registrations in the Copyright Catalogs for 1894 through 1959. There is no cumulative Copyright Catalog for 1970–1977; the Copyright Office published 16 semi-annual Copyright Catalog booklets covering that eight-year period, but all are out of print and extremely rare. All copyright registrations from 1978 onward are online at the Library of Congress website.

Some decades of The American Film Institute Catalog of Motion Pictures include copyright registration information for feature films (not shorts) of United States origin. This can include a statement that research failed to disclose copyright registration for a particular film. Copyright registration information is given in the following:

- The American Film Institute Catalog of Motion Pictures, 1931–1940; ISBN 0-913616-00-1
- The American Film Institute Catalog of Motion Pictures, 1941–1950; ISBN 0-913616-39-7

The United States copyright website catalogs all the pre-1978 works that have been renewed in 1978 or later. Several pieces of work have been renewed in the form of collections, thus giving the collection as a whole copyright protection.

=== Missing or flawed copyright notice ===
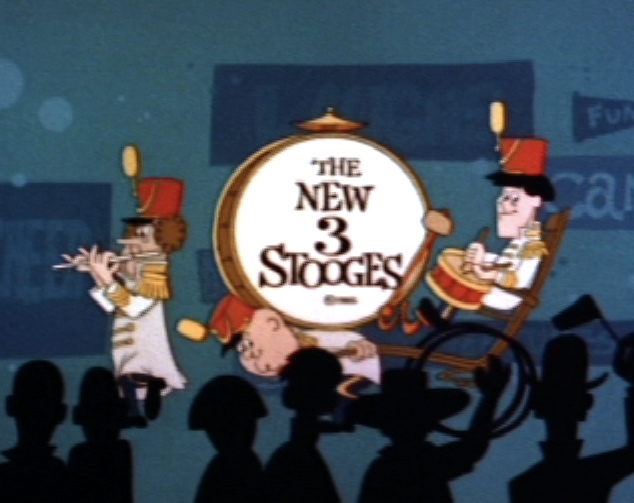
Screenshot of copyright notice that does not contain a claimant, the notice merely stating "© 1965" (view enhanced image)

Films published before March 1, 1989, had to contain a valid copyright notice in order to claim copyright. At the bare minimum, the copyright notice had to include the word "copyright" or an acceptable abbreviation (like a circled C), the year of publication (which could not be more than one year ahead of the actual publication), and the name of any entity claiming the copyright.

For example, episodes of the animated TV series The New 3 Stooges were published with an incomplete copyright notice with a year and copyright symbol but no claimant. The series was published prior to 1989, and the lack of an explicit claimant ensured that the series immediately lapsed into the public domain. If the series had been published after this date, the owner of any copyright would have been unclear due to uncertainty over ownership of the series.

As a result of the passage of the Berne Convention Implementation Act of 1988, a copyright notice is not required for films published on March 1, 1989, or later. An invalid notice or a lack of one would not invalidate the copyright to works published between 1978 and March 1, 1989, as long as a proper notice was added to subsequent copies.

=== Date of publication and renewal status ===
All motion pictures made and exhibited before 1931 are indisputably in the public domain in the United States. This date will move forward one year, every year, meaning that films released in 1931 will enter the public domain in 2027, films from 1932 in 2028, and so on, concluding with films from 1977 entering the public domain in 2073.

Films registered between 1931 and 1963 had to have their copyrights renewed in order for them not to enter the public domain. The semi-annual Copyright Catalog booklets have virtually complete lists of renewals for the films registered 28 years earlier. Those semi-annual booklets all are out of print. However, for 1931 through 1959, the Film Superlist books match copyright renewals with earlier registrations. Copyright registrations and renewals can be found in:

- Volume 1: Motion Pictures in the U.S. Public Domain 1894–1939
- Volume 2: Motion Pictures in the U.S. Public Domain 1940–1949
- Volume 3: Motion Pictures in the U.S. Public Domain 1950–1959

As a result of the Copyright Renewal Act of 1992, copyrights registered in 1964 and later were automatically renewed.

Before the passage of the Copyright Term Extension Act (CTEA) in 1998, the term of copyright in the U.S. was a maximum of 75 years, with the work entering the public domain on January 1 of the 76th year from creation (so, for example, a film made in 1930 whose copyright was properly registered and renewed would enter the public domain on January 1, 2006). As such, all films released before 1923 would have entered the public domain by January 1, 1998. Although the CTEA added 20 years to the terms of all existing copyrights until 2019, it explicitly refused to revive any copyrights that had expired prior to its passage. On January 1, 2019, the 20-year extension expired and new works began entering the public domain each year thereafter.

=== Underlying rights ===
Many of the films listed below are based on novels, plays, magazine stories or a combination of these sources. In some cases, a film's copyright has lapsed because of non-renewal while the underlying literary or dramatic source is still protected by copyright; for example, the film His Girl Friday (1940) became a public domain film in 1969 because it was not renewed, but it is based on the 1928 play The Front Page; as a practical matter, the film could not be used without permission until copyright on the play expired in 2024.

=== Work of the United States government ===
All works made by United States government employees as part of their official duties are in the public domain from their creation. The status of works made by contractors is dependent on the terms of their contract. Note that this applies only to the federal government, and not to state or local governments, which may or may not claim copyright depending on state laws.

== Films ==
This list includes films that have entered the public domain in the United States. It does not include films with a copyright before 1931 and works of the United States government. Films released under a free license, such as Creative Commons, are also excluded.

Film title	Release year	Director	Studio / Distributor	Entered the public domain	Reason for entering the public domain
Africa Screams	1949	Charles Barton	United Artists	1977	Copyright not renewed
Algiers	1938	John Cromwell	United Artists	1966	Copyright not renewed
Aladdin and His Wonderful Lamp	1939	Dave Fleischer	Paramount Pictures	[data missing]	[data missing]
The Amazing Mr. X (Note: Also known as The Spiritualist)	1948	Bernard Vorhaus	Eagle-Lion Films	[data missing]	[data missing]
Angel and the Badman	1947	James Edward Grant	Republic Pictures	1975	Copyright not renewed
The Animal Kingdom	1932	Edward H. Griffith	RKO Radio Pictures	1960	Copyright not renewed
At War with the Army	1950	Hal Walker	Paramount Pictures	[data missing]	[data missing]
Attack of the Giant Leeches	1959	Bernard L. Kowalski	American International Pictures	[data missing]	[data missing]
The Bat	1959	Crane Wilbur	Allied Artists	[data missing]	[data missing]
Beat the Devil	1953	John Huston	United Artists	1980	Copyright not renewed
Becky Sharp	1935	Rouben Mamoulian	RKO Radio Pictures	[data missing]	[data missing]
Behind Office Doors	1931	Melville W. Brown	RKO Radio Pictures	1959	Copyright not renewed
The Big Wheel	1949	Edward Ludwig	United Artists	[data missing]	[data missing]
Bird of Paradise	1932	King Vidor	RKO Radio Pictures	1960	Copyright not renewed
Blood on the Sun	1945	Frank Lloyd	United Artists	1973	Copyright not renewed
Blue Steel	1934	Robert N. Bradbury	Lone Star Pictures	[data missing]	[data missing]
Bowery at Midnight	1942	Wallace Fox	Monogram Pictures	[data missing]	[data missing]
The Brain That Wouldn't Die (Note: Originally completed in 1959 under the title The Black Door (it was then changed to The Head That Wouldn't Die), it was not released until May 3, 1962, where failure to add the copyright notice resulted in the film entering the public domain.)	1962 (completed: 1959)	Joseph Green	American International Pictures	1962	Missing copyright notice
Brideless Groom	1947	Edward Bernds	Columbia Pictures	1960s	Copyright not renewed
A Bucket of Blood	1959	Roger Corman	American International Pictures	[data missing]	[data missing]
Captain Kidd	1945	Rowland V. Lee	United Artists	[data missing]	[data missing]
Carnival of Souls (Note: There was a dispute about the rights to the film from 1990 to 1995. The entirety of the film rights might have been granted to John Clifford in 1996. The DVD release of the film by The Criterion Collection lists copyright by Harold Harvey and John Clifford.)	1962	Herk Harvey	Herts-Lion International Corp.	1962	Missing copyright notice
Charade (Note: Original music still in copyright. Original story by Peter Stone still in copyright.)	1963	Stanley Donen	Universal Pictures	1963	Defective copyright notice
The Chase (Note: Independent film left without an owner.)	1946	Arthur Ripley	Nero Films/United Artists	[data missing]	[data missing]
Cyrano de Bergerac	1950	Michael Gordon	United Artists	1980s	[data missing]
The Deadly Companions	1961	Sam Peckinpah	Pathé-America	1961	Missing copyright notice
Debbie Does Dallas (Note: The Dallas Cowboys hold veto power on commercial publication because of unauthorized use of their trademarks.)	1978	Jim Clark	VCX	1981	Missing copyright notice
Dementia 13 (Note: Also known as The Haunted and the Hunted)	1963	Francis Ford Coppola	American International Pictures	[data missing]	[data missing]
Detour	1945	Edgar G. Ulmer	Producers Releasing Corporation	[data missing]	Copyright not renewed
The Devil Bat	1940	Jean Yarbrough	Producers Releasing Corporation	[data missing]	[data missing]
Disorder in the Court	1936	Preston Black	Columbia Pictures	1960s	Copyright not renewed
D.O.A.	1950	Rudolph Maté	United Artists	1977	Copyright not renewed
The Driller Killer	1979	Abel Ferrara	Navaron Films	1979	[data missing]
The Emperor Jones	1933	Dudley Murphy	United Artists	[data missing]	[data missing]
Father's Little Dividend	1951 (copyright notice: 1950)	Vincente Minnelli	MGM	1978	Copyright not renewed
A Farewell to Arms (Note: Based on A Farewell to Arms by Ernest Hemingway.)	1932	Frank Borzage	Paramount Pictures	1960	Copyright not renewed
Fear and Desire	1953	Stanley Kubrick	Joseph Burstyn	[data missing]	Copyright not renewed
The Flying Deuces	1939	A. Edward Sutherland	RKO Radio Pictures	[data missing]	[data missing]
The Front Page	1931	Lewis Milestone	United Artists	[data missing]	[data missing]
Glen or Glenda	1953	Ed Wood	Screen Classics	[data missing]	[data missing]
Go for Broke!	1951 (copyright notice: 1950)	Robert Pirosh	MGM	1978	Copyright not renewed
The Gorilla	1939	Allan Dwan	20th Century Fox	[data missing]	[data missing]
The Great Flamarion	1945	Anthony Mann	Republic Pictures	[data missing]	Copyright not renewed
Gulliver's Travels	1939	Dave Fleischer	Paramount Pictures	1967	Copyright not renewed
His Girl Friday	1940 (copyright date: 1939)	Howard Hawks	Columbia Pictures	1967	Copyright not renewed
The Hitch-Hiker	1953	Ida Lupino	RKO Radio Pictures	[data missing]	[data missing]
The Hunchback of Notre Dame	1939	William Dieterle	RKO Radio Pictures	[data missing]	[data missing]
Indestructible Man	1956	Jack Pollexfen	Allied Artists	[data missing]	[data missing]
The Inspector General	1949	Henry Koster	Warner Bros.	[data missing]	[data missing]
It's a Wonderful Life (Note: While the film images are public domain, under rulings of Stewart v. Abend, the film text (script) is based on the copyrighted short story "The Greatest Gift" by Philip Van Doren Stern. This may only extend to the 12-minute portion of the film directly based on that story, as a 2025 re-edit removes that section to circumvent the indirect copyright. Republic also purchased the exclusive rights to the film's copyrighted music to further shore up its rights.)	1946 (copyright notice: 1947)	Frank Capra	Liberty Films; RKO Pictures	1975	Copyright not renewed
Jack and the Beanstalk (Note: Contains still copyrighted songs.)	1952	Jean Yarbrough	Warner Bros.	1980	Copyright not renewed
The Jackie Robinson Story	1950	Alfred E. Green	Eagle-Lion Films	[data missing]	[data missing]
The Joe Louis Story	1953	Robert Gordon	United Artists	[data missing]	[data missing]
Kansas City Confidential	1952	Phil Karlson	United Artists	[data missing]	Copyright not renewed
Kept Husbands	1931	Lloyd Bacon	RKO Radio Productions	1959	Copyright not renewed
The Lady Refuses	1931	George Archainbaud	RKO Radio Productions	1959	Copyright not renewed
The Last Man on Earth (Note: Source novel I Am Legend (1954) is still under copyright.)	1964	Ubaldo Ragona, Sidney Salkow	American International Pictures, 20th Century Fox	1992	Copyright not renewed
The Last Time I Saw Paris (Note: Music score still protected by copyright.)	1954 (copyright notice: 1944)	Richard Brooks	MGM	1972	Copyright not renewed, defective notice led to an earlier expiration.
Letter of Introduction	1938	John M. Stahl	Universal Pictures	1966	Copyright not renewed
Life with Father	1947	Michael Curtiz	Warner Bros.	1975	Copyright not renewed
The Little Princess	1939	Walter Lang	20th Century Fox	1967	Copyright not renewed
The Little Shop of Horrors	1960	Roger Corman	Filmgroup	1988	Copyright not renewed
Lonely Wives	1931	Russell Mack	RKO Radio Pictures	1959	Copyright not renewed
Love Affair	1939	Leo McCarey	RKO Radio Pictures	1967	Copyright not renewed
Love Laughs at Andy Hardy	1945	Willis Goldbeck	MGM	[data missing]	Copyright not renewed
The Lucky Texan	1934	Robert N. Bradbury	Lone Star Pictures	[data missing]	[data missing]
Made for Each Other	1939	John Cromwell	United Artists	[data missing]	[data missing]
Malice in the Palace	1949	Jules White	Columbia Pictures	1960s	Copyright not renewed
The Man from Utah	1934	Robert N. Bradbury	Lone Star Pictures	[data missing]	[data missing]
The Man with the Golden Arm (Note: Loosely based on the copyrighted novel by Nelson Algren, though Algren at least once disowned the film due to substantial changes from the source material and never followed through on his legal effort to claim a copyright due to lack of funds.)	1955	Otto Preminger	United Artists	[data missing]	[data missing]
Maniac (Note: Also known as Sex Maniac)	1934	Dwain Esper	Roadshow Attractions	[data missing]	[data missing]
Manos: The Hands of Fate (Note: Original script may have been copyrighted.)	1966	Harold P. Warren	Emerson Film Enterprises	1968	Failure to display copyright notice
March of the Wooden Soldiers (Note: This is a later abridgement of Babes in Toyland (1934), which is still in copyright. Its public domain status remains unclear.)	1950	Gus Meins	Lippert Pictures	1950	Failure to display copyright notice
McLintock! (Note: Music score still under copyright.)	1963	Andrew V. McLaglen	United Artists	1991	Copyright not renewed
Meet John Doe	1941	Frank Capra	Warner Bros.	1969	Copyright not renewed
Millie	1931	John Francis Dillon	RKO Radio Pictures	1959	Copyright not renewed
Mr. Imperium	1951 (copyright notice: 1950)	Don Hartman	MGM	1978	Copyright not renewed
My Dear Secretary	1948	Charles Martin	United Artists	[data missing]	[data missing]
My Favorite Brunette	1947	Elliott Nugent	Paramount Pictures	1975	Copyright not renewed
My Man Godfrey (Note: While the film images are public domain, under rulings of Stewart v. Abend, the film text (script) is based on the copyrighted 1935 book My Man Godfrey by Eric S. Hatch.)	1936	Gregory La Cava	Universal Pictures	[data missing]	[data missing]
Night of the Living Dead (Note: Night of the Living Dead entered the public domain because the original theatrical distributor, the Walter Reade Organization, neglected to place a copyright indication on the prints. In 1968, United States copyright law required a proper notice for a work to maintain a copyright: U.S. Copyright Office, Circular 92, Copyright Law of the United States of America, Chapter 4: Copyright Notice, Deposit, and Registration, Omission of notice on certain copies and phonorecords. Image Ten displayed such a notice on the title frames of the film beneath its original title, Night of the Flesh Eaters, but the distributor removed the statement when it changed the title. The restored version released on home media by The Criterion Collection is under copyright by Image Ten, Inc.)	1968	George A. Romero	Walter Reade	1968	Missing copyright notice due to an error from the distributor
Nothing Sacred	1937	William A. Wellman	Selznick, United Artists	1965	Copyright not renewed
Of Human Bondage	1934	John Cromwell	RKO Radio Pictures	1962	Copyright not renewed
Our Town	1940	Sam Wood	United Artists	[data missing]	[data missing]
The Outlaw	1943	Howard Hughes	Howard Hughes Prod., United Artists	1971	Copyright not renewed
The Painted Hills	1951	Harold F. Kress	MGM	1979	Copyright not renewed
Penny Serenade	1941	George Stevens	Columbia Pictures	1968	Copyright not renewed
Plan 9 from Outer Space	1959	Ed Wood	Distributors Corporation of America	1987	[data missing]
Popeye the Sailor Meets Ali Baba's Forty Thieves	1937	Dave Fleischer	Paramount Pictures	[data missing]	[data missing]
Popeye the Sailor Meets Sindbad the Sailor	1936	Dave Fleischer	Paramount Pictures	[data missing]	[data missing]
Pot o' Gold	1941	George Marshall	United Artists	[data missing]	[data missing]
Quicksand	1950	Irving Pichel	United Artists	[data missing]	[data missing]
Rage at Dawn	1955	Tim Whelan	RKO Pictures	[data missing]	[data missing]
Rain	1932	Lewis Milestone	United Artists	1960	Copyright not renewed
Randy Rides Alone	1934	Harry L. Fraser	Lone Star Pictures	1934	Copyright notice lacks claimant.
The Red House	1947	Delmer Daves	United Artists	[data missing]	[data missing]
Reefer Madness (Note: Also known as The Burning Question, Dope Addict and Tell Your Children)	1936	Louis J. Gasnier	Motion Picture Ventures	1936	Improper copyright notice
Riders of Destiny	1933	Robert N. Bradbury	Lone Star Pictures	[data missing]	[data missing]
Road to Bali	1952	Hal Walker	Paramount Pictures	1980	Copyright not renewed
Rock, Rock, Rock! (Note: The Chuck Berry soundtrack of the film may not be in the public domain.)	1956	Will Price	Distributors Corporation of America	1984	Copyright not renewed
Royal Wedding	1951 (copyright notice: 1950)	Stanley Donen	MGM	1978	Copyright not renewed
Sagebrush Trail (Note: Remake of Partners of the Trail (Wallace Fox, 1931))	1933	Armand Schaefer	Lone Star Pictures	1933	Copyright notice lacks claimant
Salt of the Earth (Note: Selected for preservation in the National Film Registry in 1992)	1954	Herbert Biberman	Independent Productions	1982	Copyright not renewed
Santa Claus Conquers the Martians (Note: Musical score owned by Famous Music)	1964	Nicholas Webster	Embassy Pictures Corporation	1964	Missing copyright notice
Santa Fe Trail	1940	Michael Curtiz	Warner Bros.	1968	Copyright not renewed
Scarlet Street	1945	Fritz Lang	Universal Pictures	[data missing]	[data missing]
The Screaming Skull	1958	Alex Nicol	American International Pictures	1958	Never registered for copyright.
Second Chorus	1940	H.C. Potter	Paramount Pictures	[data missing]	Copyright not renewed
Sing a Song of Six Pants	1947	Jules White	Columbia Pictures	1960s	Copyright not renewed
Sinners in Paradise	1938	James Whale	Universal Pictures	1966	Copyright not renewed
The Snows of Kilimanjaro (Note: Based on the copyrighted novel by Ernest Hemingway)	1952	Henry King	20th Century Fox	[data missing]	[data missing]
The Southerner	1945	Jean Renoir	United Artists	[data missing]	[data missing]
A Star Is Born	1937	William A. Wellman	Selznick, United Artists	1965	Copyright not renewed
The Star Packer	1934	Robert N. Bradbury	Lone Star Pictures	[data missing]	[data missing]
The Strange Love of Martha Ivers	1946	Lewis Milestone	Paramount Pictures	1974	Copyright not renewed
The Stranger	1946	Orson Welles	International Pictures, RKO Radio Productions	1973	Copyright not renewed
Suddenly	1954	Lewis Allen	United Artists	1983	Copyright not renewed
Superman (1940s cartoon series)	1941-1943	Dave Fleischer, various	Paramount Pictures	[data missing]	[data missing]
Swing High, Swing Low	1937	Mitchell Leisen	Paramount Pictures	1965	Copyright not renewed
Teenagers from Outer Space	1959	Tom Graeff	Warner Bros.	1987	Copyright not renewed
The Terror (Note: In the early 1990s, Corman asked Mark Griffiths to shoot 12 minutes of additional footage starring Dick Miller, thus making a new film titled The Return of the Terror (1991), so Corman could claim his copyright.)	1963	Roger Corman	American International Pictures, Filmgroup	1963	Missing copyright registration
The Terror of Tiny Town	1938	Sam Newfield	Columbia Pictures	1966	Copyright not renewed
Three Guys Named Mike	1951 (copyright notice: 1950)	Charles Walters	MGM	1978	Copyright not renewed
Till the Clouds Roll By	1946	Richard Whorf	MGM	1974	Copyright not renewed
Too Late for Tears	1949	Byron Haskin	United Artists	[data missing]	[data missing]
Topper Returns	1941	Roy Del Ruth	United Artists	1969	Copyright not renewed
Utopia (a.k.a. Atoll K)	1951	Léo Joannon and John Berry (uncredited)	Franco London Films	1951	No U.S. copyright filed
Vengeance Valley	1951 (copyright notice: 1950)	Richard Thorpe	MGM	1978	Copyright not renewed
The Wasp Woman	1959	Roger Corman	Filmgroup	[data missing]	[data missing]
West of the Divide	1934	Robert N. Bradbury	Lone Star Pictures	[data missing]	[data missing]
White Zombie (Note: Based on The Magic Island by William Seabrook)	1932	Victor Halperin	United Artists	[data missing]	[data missing]
Wives Under Suspicion	1938	James Whale	Universal Pictures	1966	Copyright not renewed
Woman on the Run	1950	Norman Foster	Universal Pictures	[data missing]	[data missing]

== See also ==
- History of film
- List of open-source films
- Lists of films
- List of animated films in the public domain in the United States
- List of years in film
- Open-source film
- Outline of film
- List of public domain works with multimedia adaptations
- Public domain in the United States
- The Story of Film: An Odyssey

== Bibliography ==
- Fishman, Stephen (2010). The Public Domain: How to Find & Use Copyright-Free Writings, Music, Art & More (5th ed.). Nolo (retrieved via Internet Archive). ISBN 978-1-4133-1205-8.
- Pierce, David (June 2007). "Forgotten Faces: Why Some of Our Cinema Heritage Is Part of the Public Domain" (available at davidpiercefilm.com). Film History: An International Journal. 19 (2): 125–43. doi:10.2979/FIL.2007.19.2.125. ISSN 0892-2160. JSTOR 25165419. OCLC 15122313. S2CID 191633078.
