= Ben Lucien Burman =

American writer (1895–1984)

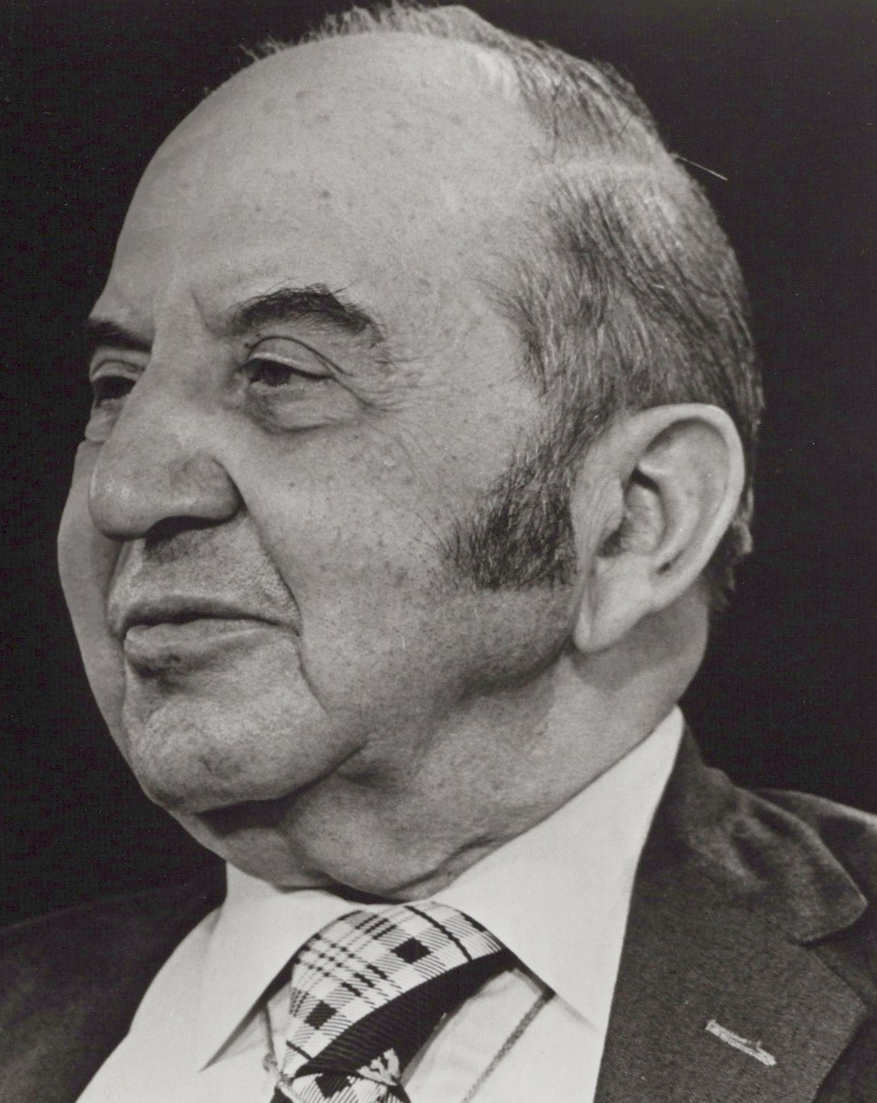
Burman in 1973

Ben Lucien Burman (December 12, 1895 – November 12, 1984) was an American author and journalist born in Covington, Kentucky. He also fought in both World War I and World War II, and graduated from Harvard University. He was married to Alice Caddy who illustrated many of his children's books, including his most popular books, the Catfish Bend series, which became popular with both children and adults. The series, set in Catfish Bend, Mississippi, tells a tale of the many animal residents of Catfish Bend. It was published in eleven languages.

Burman died from a stroke at the age of 88.

== Bibliography ==
- Mississippi, illustrated by wife, Alice Caddy, 1929
  - adapted to film as Heaven on Earth in 1931, directed by Russell Mack
- Then There's Cripple Creek, 1930
- Steamboat 'round the Bend, illustrated by Caddy, 1933
  - adapted to film as Steamboat Round the Bend in 1935, directed by John Ford
- Blow for a Landing, 1938
- Big River to Cross: Mississippi Life Today, illustrated by Caddy, 1940
- Miracle on the Congo: Report from the Free French Front, 1942
- Rooster Crows for Day, illustrated by Caddy, 1945
- Everywhere I Roam, illustrated by Caddy, 1949
- Children of Noah: Glimpses of Unknown America, illustrated by Caddy, 1951
- The Four Lives of Mundy Tolliver, 1953
- It's a Big Country: America off the Highways, illustrated by Caddy, 1956
- The Street of the Laughing Camel, illustrated by Caddy, 1959
- It's a Big Continent, illustrated by Caddy, 1961
- The Generals Wear Cork Hats: An Amazing Adventure That Made World History, illustrated by Caddy, 1963
- The Sign of the Praying Tiger, illustrated by Caddy, 1966
- Look Down That Winding River: An Informal Profile of the Mississippi, illustrated by Caddy, 1973
- High Water at Catfish Bend, 1952, reprinted, 1981
- Seven Stars for Catfish Bend, 1956, reprinted, 1981
- The Owl Hoots Twice at Catfish Bend, 1961, reprinted, 1981
- Blow a Wild Bugle for Catfish Bend, 1967
- High Treason at Catfish Bend, 1977
- The Strange Invasion of Catfish Bend, 1980
- Thunderbolt at Catfish Bend, 1984

== Cancelled Disney Film ==
In the late 1970s, Disney greenlit an animated film adaptation of Burman's Catfish Bend stories with Ken Anderson heading the project. Despite making a large amount of progress and scheduling a 1981 release date, the film was eventually shelved.

== Discography ==
- Steamboat 'Round the Bend: Songs & Stories of the Mississippi, 1956, Folkways Records

== Sources ==
- The New York Times
