= Battle Cry of Peace =

Song
- Published: 1916
- Genre: War song
- Composer(s): William Donaldson
- Lyricist(s): Henry T. Bunce

"Battle Cry of Peace" is a World War I-era song composed by William Donaldson with lyrics by Henry T. Bruce. It was published by F.B. Haviland Publishing Company in 1916.

== Copyrights ==
"Battle Cry of Peace" was entered into the Library of Congress' Catalog of Copyright Entries on March 6, 1916 under the F.B. Haviland Publishing Company.
