= Second Wife (1930 film) =

1930 film

- Conrad Nagel and Lila Lee
- Directed by: Russell Mack
- Written by: Bert Glennon; Hugh Herbert
- Based on: All the King's Men by Fulton Oursler
- Produced by: William LeBaron
- Starring: Conrad Nagel; Lila Lee; Mary Carr
- Cinematography: William Marshall
- Edited by: George Marsh; Ann McKnight
- Production company: RKO Pictures
- Distributed by: RKO Pictures
- Release dates: February 6, 1930 (Premiere-New York City); February 9, 1930 (US)
- Running time: 64 minutes
- Country: United States
- Language: English

Second Wife is a 1930 American drama film produced and released by RKO Pictures. It was directed by Russell Mack, written by Hugh Herbert and Bert Glennon, based on the play All the King's Men by Fulton Oursler. The film stars Conrad Nagel and Lila Lee, two silent film veterans moving into talkies.

A print of this film is held by the Library of Congress.

== Plot ==
Not long after the death of his first wife, Walter Fairchild becomes engaged to Florence Wendell. Florence ignores the warnings of Gilbert Gaylord, who is also interested in marrying her, that she doesn't know what she is getting herself into; that no woman will ever be able to fill the void in Fairchild's life left by the death of his wife. After they are married, Fairchild and Florence have some contention as she buys into the warnings given her by Gaylord. To appease her, they move out of the house he shared with his first wife, and allows her to furnish the new home. Sensing that he and his new wife need some time alone together to start their new lives, he sends his seven-year-old son, Walter Jr., to a boarding school in Switzerland. After Florence becomes pregnant, Fairchild is notified that is son is very ill, and will most likely not recover. Despite Florence's pleas for him not to leave her, he travels to his son's side. As he leaves, Florence tells him not to return.

As Fairchild waits with his son, Florence is once again wooed by her former suitor, Gaylord. Thinking that she is permanently estranged from her husband, Florence agrees to run away with him. Walter Jr. recovers from his illness, and returns home with his father. As Florence is about to leave with Gaylord, he tells her that he only wants her, that she'll have to give up the baby. She refuses, and returns to Fairchild, who takes her back.

== Cast ==
- Conrad Nagel as Walter Fairchild
- Lila Lee as Florence Wendell Fairchild
- Mary Carr as Mrs. "Rhodie" Rhodes, a housekeeper
- Hugh Huntley as Gilbert Gaylord
- Freddie Burke Frederick as Walter Fairchild Jr.

== Reception ==
Mordaunt Hall, The New York Times critic, gave the film a mixed review, praising the performances, while giving a lukewarm reception of the writing and direction.

== Notes ==
The story was refilmed again in 1936 as Second Wife, and this is also held at the Library of Congress.
