= Lonely Wives =

1931 film

- Theatrical poster
- Directed by: Russell Mack
- Written by: Walter DeLeon
- Based on: Tanzanwalt; 1912 vaudeville act by Pordes Milo; Walter Schütt; Eric Urban
- Produced by: E.B. Derr
- Starring: Edward Everett Horton; Esther Ralston; Laura La Plante; Patsy Ruth Miller
- Cinematography: Edward Snyder
- Edited by: Joseph Kane
- Music by: Francis Gromon
- Production company: Pathé Exchange
- Distributed by: RKO Radio Pictures
- Release date: February 22, 1931
- Running time: 85 minutes
- Country: United States
- Language: English

Lonely Wives (complete film)

Lonely Wives is a 1931 American comedy film directed by Russell Mack and produced by E.B. Derr for Pathé Exchange. Distributed by RKO Pictures after the merger of the two studios, it stars Edward Everett Horton, Esther Ralston, Laura La Plante, and Patsy Ruth Miller. The screenplay by Walter DeLeon is based upon a successful German vaudeville act called Tanzanwalt, penned by Pordes Milo, Walter Schütt, and Dr. Eric Urban. The German production was translated for the American stage by DeLeon and Mark Swan, under the same title as the film.

== Plot ==
Edward Everett Horton, in dual roles as Richard and Felix, the Great Zero.

Richard "Dickie" Smith is a seemingly respectable defense attorney by day who turns into a philandering Don Juan when the clock strikes 8 o’clock. His wife, Madeline, has been away for several months, and is not expected back anytime soon. However, Madeline's mother, Mrs. Mantel is staying with the Smiths, in an effort to curtail the possibility of any straying by Richard. Unbeknownst to her, he has made plans to go out on the town that night with his new, sultry secretary Kitty Minter, and his new sexy client, Diane O'Dare, who, a lonely wife herself, wishes to divorce her husband for neglect.

The issue is: How can he go out on the town without alerting his mother-in-law? The issue seems to be resolved by the arrival at his home of Felix, the Great Zero, a vaudeville impersonator. Felix is seeking permission to impersonate the famous lawyer on-stage. At first reluctant, Richard, noticing the striking resemblance between himself and the actor, realizes he might have a way to deceive Mrs. Mantel. In order to obtain his approval, Felix must agree to impersonate him at his house that evening, while he goes out.

While Richard goes out on the town, Madeline arrives home early and unannounced. Thinking that he is about to be exposed, Felix phones the nightclub where Richard has taken the two women for dinner and drinks. As he waits for the return phone call, much to his surprise, rather than exposing him as an imposter, Madeline begins to come on to him. He attempts to resist, trying to hold out until he can speak to Richard, but he succumbs to her charms just as the phone begins ringing.

When Richard returns home the next morning, Felix is still there. He is followed closely by a very inebriated Diane; it seems he has spent his time away from home with her. When Felix recognizes Diane, and Richard understands that Felix spent the night at his house with Madeline, each men believes that his look-a-like has slept with the others' wife. After a series of farcical events, Smith ends up chasing Zero with a loaded gun. Meanwhile, Andrews, the butler, thinks he must have the DT’s, seeing double of his employer.

Patsy Ruth Miller, Laura La Plante, and Esther Ralston, The Lonely Wives (1931).

The truth comes out when Madeline admits that she knew it wasn't Richard all along, and, other than the kissing, nothing happened between the two of them. Diane admits that she spent the night in the cab, riding around, and not with Richard. Reconciled, Richard is cured of his wandering ways and Felix and Diane are reunited.

== Cast ==
- Edward Everett Horton as Richard "Dickie" Smith, and Felix, the Great Zero
- Esther Ralston as Madeline Smith
- Laura La Plante as Diane O'Dare
- Patsy Ruth Miller as Kitty "Minty" Minter
- Spencer Charters as Andrews, the Butler
- Maude Eburne as Mrs. Mantel
- Maurice Black as Taxi Driver
- Georgette Rhodes as Muzette

(Cast as per AFI database)

== Production ==
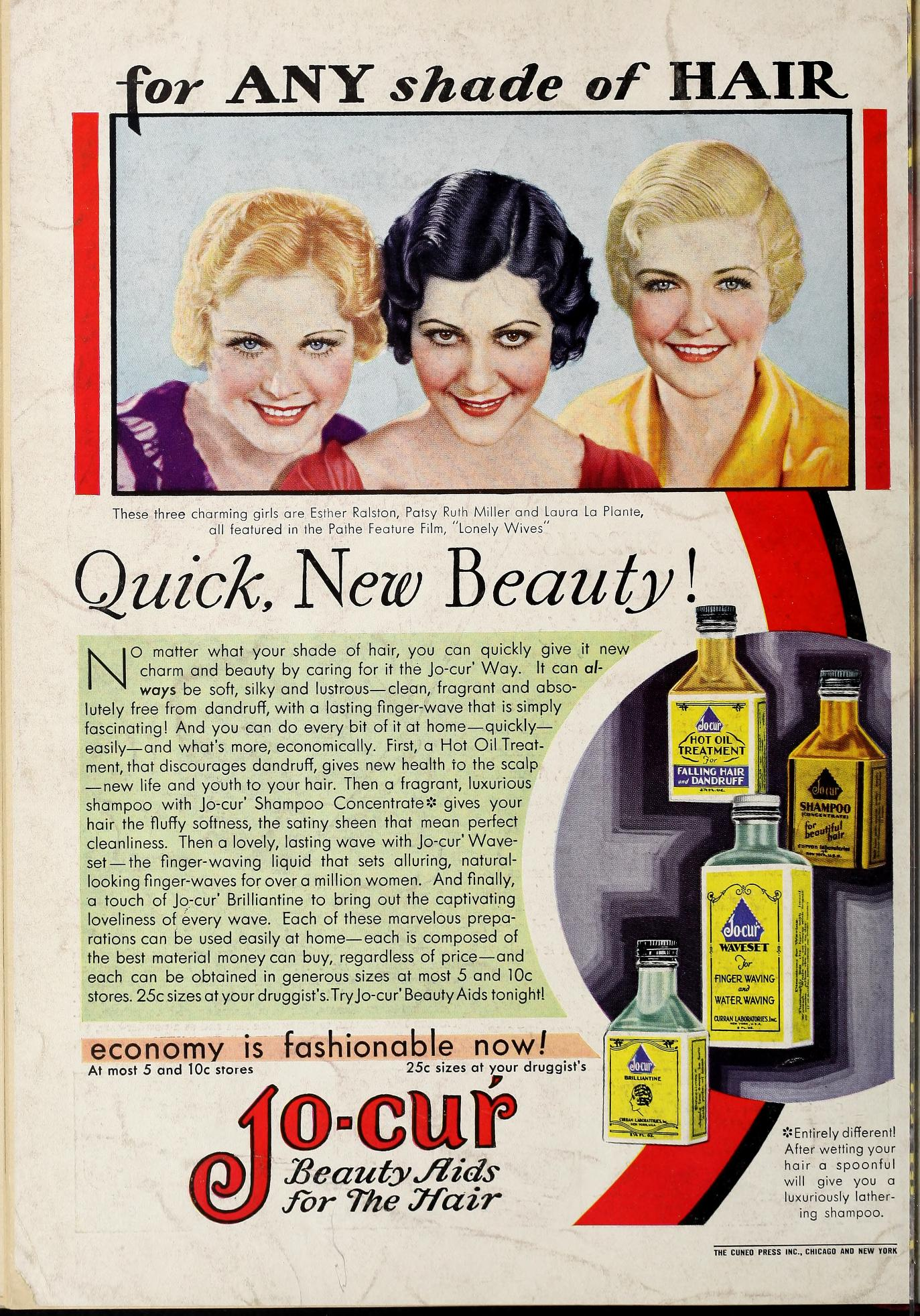
Tie-in advertisement for Jo-Cur Beauty Products and Lonely Wives.

Pathé announced that the film was going into production in mid-November 1930, with Russell Mack at the helm. Shortly after, it was reported that La Plante had been attached to the cast; La Plante was returning to films after a brief seven-month hiatus, during which time speculation arose that her career might be over. Her appearance in this film, and its success, would re-ignite her career. On December 7, it was learned that DeLeon would be adapting the story into a screenplay, and on the 10th the announcement came that Esther Ralston and Patsy Ruth Miller would be added to the list of cast members, along with Edward Everett Horton. Horton and Miller had co-starred in four films together for Warner Brothers during the previous season. The following day, December 11, The Film Daily announced that the film had begun production. Included in the cast was Spencer Charters, who had acted with Mack in several Broadway plays.

Pathé announced that the film would be part of its 1931 schedule. It began to appear in the trades on Pathe's list of upcoming releases, but without a specific release date. The release was held up in late January due to the sale of Pathé to RKO Pictures. By the end of the month, the go-ahead was given to release the film. Finally, on February 16, RKO announced they would release the film the following week. Several days prior to its release, Pathé announced that the marketing campaign for the film would include "tie-ins" with a coterie of manufacturers and retail stores. The campaign would include drug stores and department stores, and have advertising material supplied by such manufacturers as Underwood (typewriters), John H. Woodbury (toiletries), and Jo-Cur Laboratories (beauty products). Lonely Wives was released by RKO on February 22, 1931.

== Soundtrack ==
- "Madeline", unknown composer
- "Baby Feet", unknown composer, sung by Maude Eburne

== Reception ==
Mordaunt Hall, the film critic for The New York Times, gave the film a positive review, calling the direction "skillful" and singling out the performances of several actors, including Esther Ralston, Maude Eburne, Patsy Ruth Miller and Spencer Charters. He was especially impressed with Horton, writing that he "delivers a wonderfully clever dual impersonation ...", and is "wonderfully amusing". The Film Daily also gave the film a nod of approval, calling it "... one of the cleverest and most entertaining comedies of the season". They particularly highlighted the Mack's direction, Horton's performance in his dual role, while complimenting the rest of the cast. The trade paper also gave the highest marks to the cinematography of Edward Snyder.

Photoplay listed it as one of the best films of the month in February 1931, singling out the acting talents of Horton, Ralston, La Plante, and Miller. Picture Play Magazine was a bit more reserved in their review of the film. While they called it "... the most consistently broad comedy of any film since "The Cock-eyed World"," they also called it "supposedly hilarious". Other positive reviews came from: Billboard, "... destined to be one of the laugh highlights of the screen year"; Motion Picture Herald, "Highly sophisticated comedy, goes over with a great laugh"; Los Angeles Express, "Fast, furious, frothy farce. Lonely Wives is a laugh riot"; and Motion Picture Daily, "Laughs keep rolling out in a steady deluge of ultra-sophisticated wise cracks."

== Notes ==
In 1959, the film entered the public domain in the United States because the claimants did not renew its copyright registration in the 28th year after publication.

It was released on DVD by Roan/Troma Entertainment in 2001.

The English translation of the 1912 German vaudeville act, Tanzanwalt, titled Lonely Wives, written by DeLeon and Mark Swan, was produced by A.H. Woods in Stamford, Connecticut on August 11, 1922. The play was scheduled to open in New York in August 1922, starring a well-known female impersonator of that time, Julian Eltinge as its star, but was never produced, apparently because while humorous, it had no value or integrity.

The film was acquired by RKO when they purchased Pathé Exchange in January 1931.
