= Frances Upton =

American actress

- circa 1930
- Born: April 15, 1904; Pennsylvania, U.S.
- Died: November 27, 1975 (aged 71); Philadelphia, Pennsylvania, U.S.
- Occupations: Actress, comedian
- Spouse: Bert Bell
- Children: 3, including Upton Bell

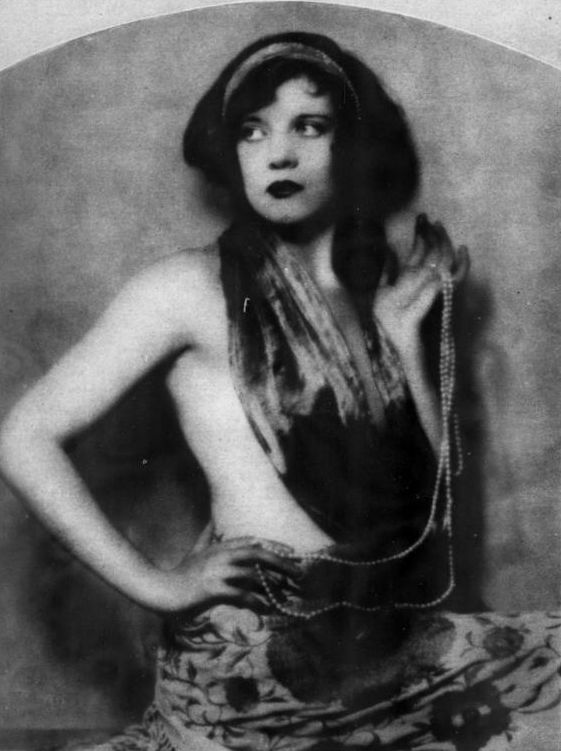
The Smart Set, 1927

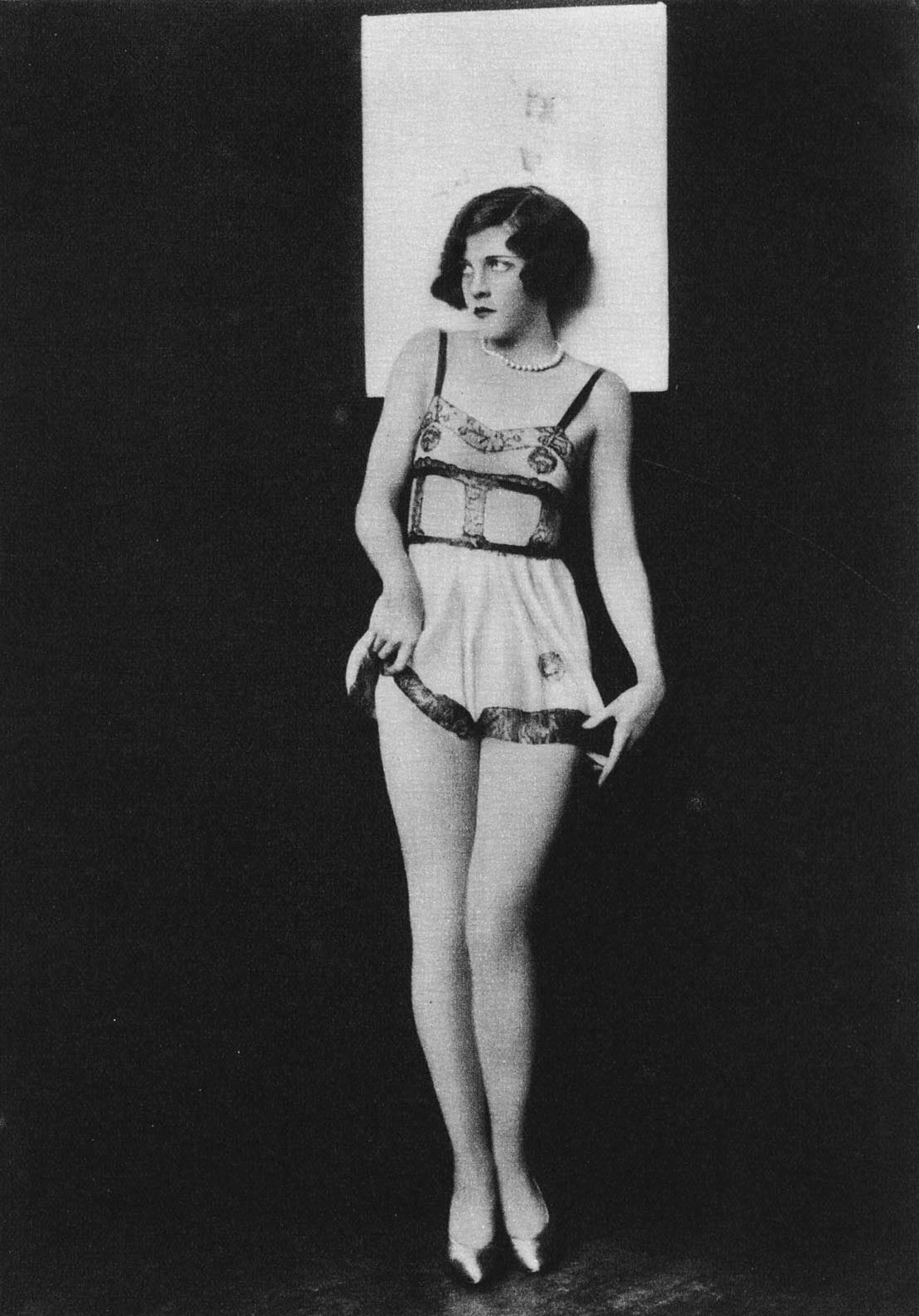
Ziegfeld girl, 1928

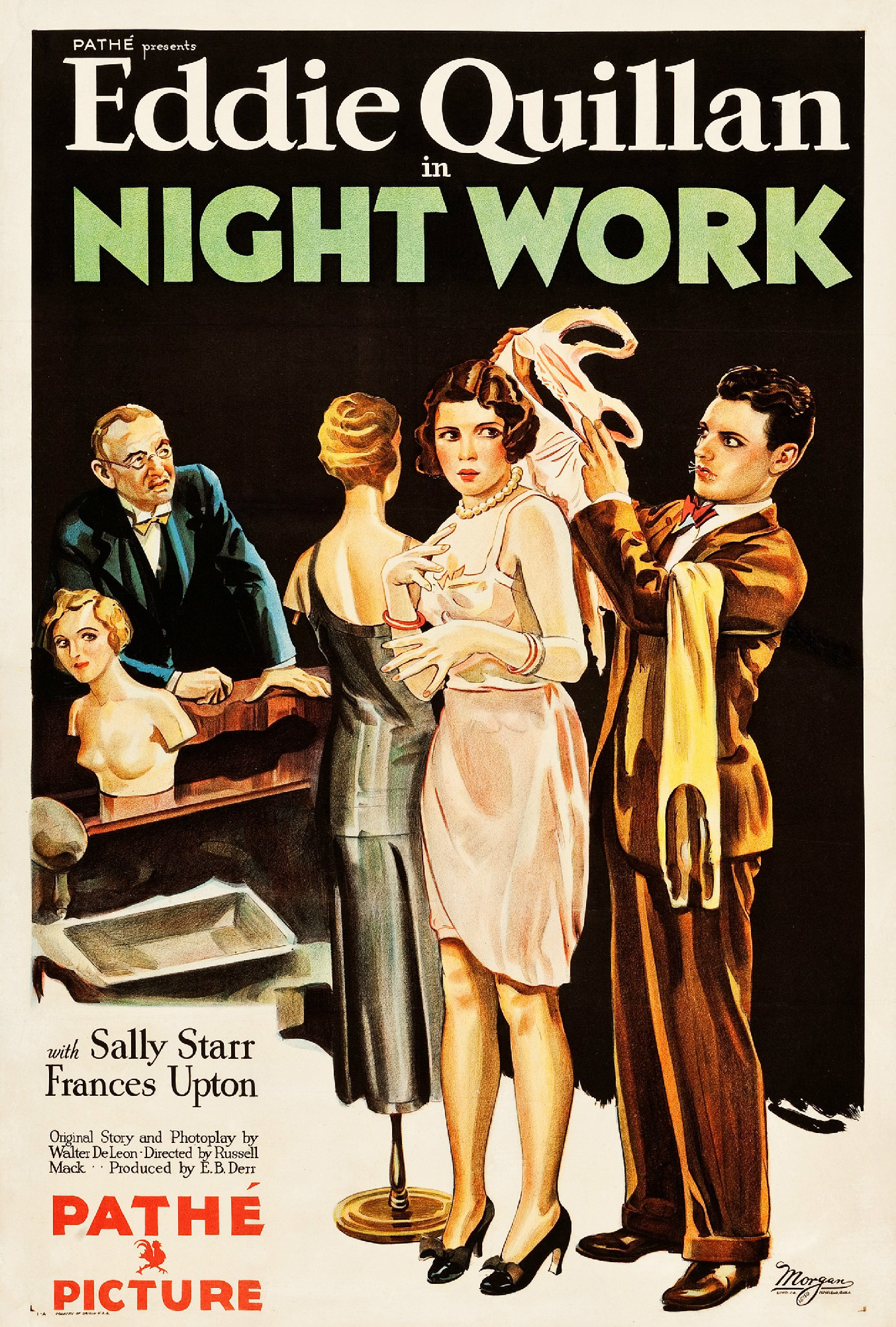
Poster for Night Work (1930)

Frances Upton (April 15, 1904 – November 27, 1975) was an American Broadway theatre actress and comedian.

== Early life ==
Upton attended a business college after she finished high school.

Her father, Francis, was a decorated New York City detective sergeant and World War I veteran., formerly of the Italian Squad, and recalled from retirement, to help investigate, apprehended "Dago" Frank Cirofici, among the accomplices of NYPD Lieutenant Charles Becker in the 1912 murder of bookmaker Herman Rosenthal. Her paternal grandfather, William C. Upton, was a member of Ireland's Fenian movement of the late 19th century, and wrote a novel, about life under English rule, Uncle Pat's Cabin (1882).

== Career ==
She worked in at Macy's perfume counter, also a store's music department. She also took dancing lessons, which helped her get a part in a benefit production. Director Julian Mitchell saw her perform and offered her an opportunity to go on Broadway. On Broadway, Upton appeared in Pins and Needles (Feb 01, 1922 - Mar 11, 1922) Shubert Theatre (Broadway), and Little Jessie James (Aug 15, 1923 - Jan 27, 1924) Longacre Theatre.

In 1923 and 1927, she is known to have signed contracts with the Ziegfeld Follies.

On Broadway, Upton starred with Eddie Cantor in Whoopee! (1928) and the Ziegfeld Follies of 1927 (1927). Her other Broadway credits included Hold Your Horses (1933), Girl Crazy (1931), Talk About Girls (1927), Lady Do (1927), Twinkle, Twinkle (1926), and My Girl (1924). She also performed in vaudeville.

In 1929, Upton performed on a network shortwave radio program specially broadcast to Richard Byrd's expedition to the South Pole. She had a featured role in the early sound film Night Work (1930). In 1931, she starred in one of the first experimental television broadcasts in New York City, appearing with Gertrude Lawrence, Lionel Atwill, and boxer Primo Carnera.

On July 9, 1933, Upton provided the money, $2,500, prior to marriage, to her later-husband to buy the NFL rights for the Philadelphia area that had formerly belonged to the Frankford Athletic Association which became the Philadelphia Eagles.

== Personal life ==
In 1932, Bert Bell met Upton, who later said, "It's alcohol or me". He finished his drink and turned it upside down and never drank again.

With his colorful personal life and hell-raising early years over, Bell's marriage to Upton was, at first, secret. On 4 January 1934, Upton married Philadelphia Eagles owner Bert Bell. (Note: Newspapers reported the marriage in May 1934, following an April column by Walter Winchell where he mentioned that Bell and Upton had been married "months ago".) Bell later served as commissioner of the National Football League (NFL). They had three children, sons John "Bert Jr." and Upton, and daughter Jane.

Upton died on November 27, 1975, in Lankenau Hospital at age 71.
