= Private Jones =

1933 film by Russell Mack

- Theatrical release poster
- Directed by: Russell Mack
- Screenplay by: Prescott Chaplin; Bill Cohen; George Jessel; William N. Robson; Sam Spewack
- Story by: Richard Schayer
- Produced by: Carl Laemmle, Jr.
- Starring: Lee Tracy; Gloria Stuart; Donald Cook; Emma Dunn; Shirley Grey; Frank McHugh
- Cinematography: Charles J. Stumar
- Edited by: Robert Carlisle
- Production company: Universal Pictures
- Distributed by: Universal Pictures
- Release date: March 25, 1933
- Running time: 70 minutes
- Country: United States
- Language: English

Private Jones is a 1933 American pre-Code comedy film directed by Russell Mack and written by Prescott Chaplin, Bill Cohen, George Jessel, William N. Robson and Sam Spewack. The film, which stars Lee Tracy, Gloria Stuart, Donald Cook, Emma Dunn, Shirley Grey and Frank McHugh, was released by Universal Pictures on March 25, 1933.

== Plot ==
Mr. Jones is drafted to fight in World War I, after America declares war on Germany in 1917. He is, however, wholly unwilling. He attempts to evade the draft by arguing to be the sole provider for his family, but to no avail. He "snarl[s] at patriotism," and does not think there is any reason for him to fight the Germans. After actively fighting for his country, his opinions may have changed.

== Cast ==
- Lee Tracy as Pvt. William 'Bill' Jones
- Gloria Stuart as Mary Gregg
- Donald Cook as Lt. John Gregg
- Emma Dunn as Mrs. Jones
- Shirley Grey as Helen Jones
- Frank McHugh as 'Greasy'
- Russell Gleason as Williams
- Walter Catlett as Spivey
- Berton Churchill as Roger Winthrop
