= Carl Laemmle Jr. =

American film producer (1908–1979)

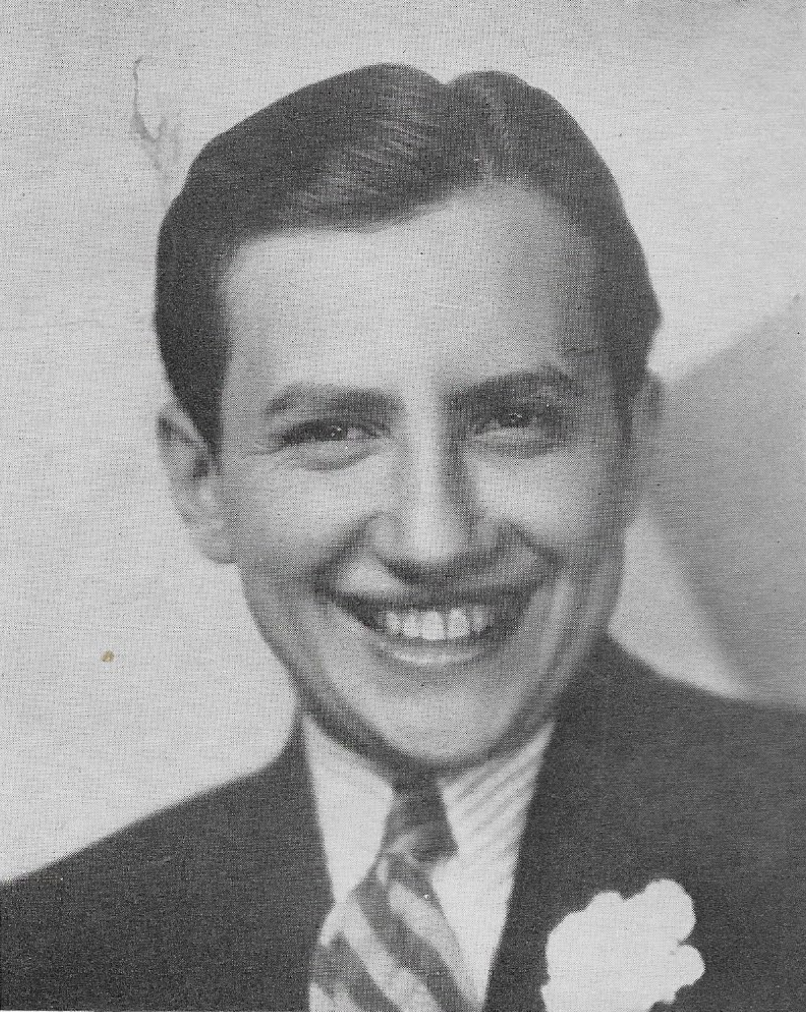
- Laemmle Jr. in 1929
- Born: Julius Laemmle; April 28, 1908; Chicago, Illinois, U.S.
- Died: September 24, 1979 (aged 71); Los Angeles, California, U.S.
- Occupations: Film producer; studio executive
- Years active: 1926–1936

Carl Laemmle Jr. (born Julius Laemmle; April 28, 1908 – September 24, 1979) was an American film producer, studio executive and heir of Carl Laemmle, who had founded Universal Studios. He was head of production at the studio from 1928 to 1936.

== Early life ==
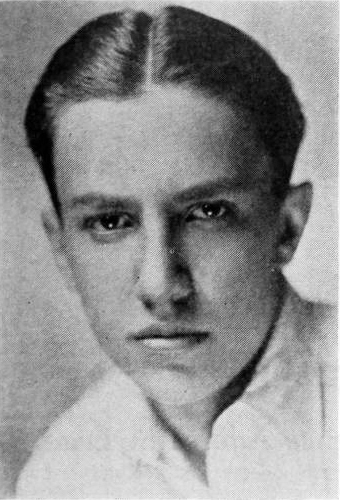
Laemmle Jr., c. 1926

Laemmle was born on April 28, 1908, in Chicago, the son of Carl Laemmle, the founder of Universal Pictures, and Recha Stern Laemmle, who died in 1919 when he was eleven years old. Carl Jr. had a sister named Rosabelle. He also had a cousin Carla, an actress and dancer. His mother was buried in Salem Fields Cemetery, Glendale, New York. His family was Jewish, and during the 1930s Carl Laemmle Sr. assisted Jewish people in leaving Germany.

The Laemmle family shared a large New York City apartment located at 465 West End Avenue before moving to Los Angeles, California.

== Career ==
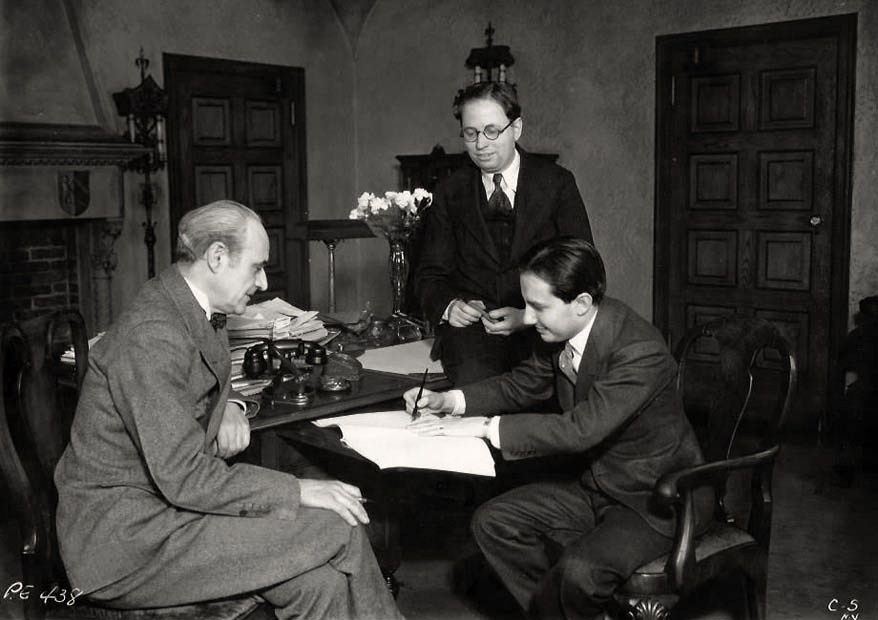
L. to. R. : Joseph P. Bickerton Jr. (theatre producer), Elmer Rice (playwright) and Carl Laemmle Jr. sign a contract for the film version of Counsellor at Law

During his tenure as head of production, beginning in 1928 in the early years of talkie movies, the studio had great success with films such as All Quiet on the Western Front (1930), Dracula (1931), Waterloo Bridge (1931), Frankenstein (1931), East of Borneo (1931), A House Divided (1931), The Mummy (1932), The Old Dark House (1932), The Invisible Man (1933), Imitation of Life (1934), and Bride of Frankenstein (1935).

Laemmle (often referred to as "Junior") developed a reputation during this period for spending too much money on films that did not earn back their cost. By the end of 1935, Universal Studio had spent so much money, and had so many flops, that J. Cheever Cowdin offered to buy the Laemmles out. The notable success, both financially and critically, of the 1936 film Show Boat, was not enough to stem the downslide, and father and son were both forced out of the company. Neither worked on another film again, although Laemmle Jr. lived for 43 more years. Charles R. Rogers became the new head of production at the studio.

== Personal life ==
Laemmle resided at 1641 Tower Grove Drive in Beverly Hills, California. He died from a stroke at the age of 71 on September 24, 1979, exactly 40 years after the day of his father's death. He was buried in the Chapel Mausoleum at Home of Peace Cemetery.

== Filmography ==
Year	Title	Notes
1929	Speeding Youth	
1929	Smilin' Guns	
1929	The Charlatan	
1929	The Rivals	
1929	College Love	
1929	The Varsity Drag	
1929	Flying High	
1929	Show Boat	
1929	On the Sidelines	
1929	Broadway	
1929	Barnum Was Right	
1929	One Hysterical Night	
1929	Shanghai Lady	
1930	Hell's Heroes	
1930	The Night Ride	
1930	King of Jazz	
1930	What Men Want	
1930	Little Accident	
1930	The Storm	
1930	All Quiet on the Western Front	
1930	Outside the Law	
1930	A Lady Surrenders	
1930	East Is West	
1930	The Cat Creeps	
1930	La Voluntad del Muerto	Spanish-language version of The Cat Creeps
1930	Oriente es Occidente	Spanish-language version of East Is West
1930	The Boudoir Diplomat	
1930	The Cohens and Kellys in Africa	
1930	Free Love	
1931	Resurrection	
1931	Dracula	
1931	Don Juan diplomático	Spanish-language version of The Boudoir Diplomat
1931	Many a Slip	
1931	Resurreccíon	Spanish-language version of Resurrection
1931	Drácula	Spanish-language version of Dracula
1931	Bad Sister	
1931	Virtuous Husband	
1931	Seed	
1931	Iron Man	
1931	Up for Murder	
1931	Boudoir Diplomatique	French-language version of The Boudoir Diplomat
1931	Ex-Bad Boy	
1931	Homicide Squad	
1931	East of Borneo	
1931	Waterloo Bridge	
1931	The Spirit of Notre Dame	
1931	Lasca of the Rio Grande	
1931	Frankenstein	
1931	Heaven on Earth	
1931	Strictly Dishonorable	
1931	A House Divided	
1932	The Unexpected Father	
1932	Law and Order	
1932	Racing Youth	
1932	Murders in the Rue Morgue	
1932	The Impatient Maiden	
1932	Steady Company	
1932	The Cohens and Kellys in Hollywood	
1932	Scandal for Sale	
1932	Destry Rides Again	
1932	The Rider of Death Valley	
1932	The Doomed Battalion	
1932	Night World	
1932	Radio Patrol	
1932	Fast Companions	
1932	The Texas Bad Man	
1932	Tom Brown of Culver	
1932	My Pal, the King	
1932	Back Street	
1932	Okay America!	
1932	Once in a Lifetime	
1932	The Old Dark House	
1932	Hidden Gold	
1932	Air Mail	
1932	Afraid to Talk	
1932	They Just Had to Get Married	
1932	The Mummy	
1932	Flaming Guns	
1933	Laughter in Hell	
1933	Nagana	
1933	Terror Trail	
1933	The Rustler's Roundup	
1933	Private Jones	
1933	Destination Unknown	
1933	Out All Night	
1933	The Cohens and Kellys in Trouble	
1933	Lucky Dog	
1933	The Big Cage	
1933	Secret of the Blue Room	
1933	The Kiss Before the Mirror	
1933	Horse Play	
1933	Don't Bet on Love	
1933	Her First Mate	
1933	S.O.S. Iceberg	
1933	Ladies Must Love	
1933	Love, Honor, and Oh Baby!	
1933	The Invisible Man	
1933	Only Yesterday	
1933	Counsellor at Law	
1933	King for a Night	
1933	By Candlelight	
1934	Bombay Mail	
1934	Cross Country Cruise	
1934	Beloved	
1934	The Poor Rich	
1934	Madame Spy	
1934	The Crosby Case	
1934	Uncertain Lady	
1934	Love Birds	
1934	I'll Tell the World	
1934	Let's Be Ritzy	
1934	Affairs of a Gentleman	
1934	The Black Cat	
1934	Little Man, What Now?	
1934	Half a Sinner	
1934	The Love Captive	
1934	One More River	
1934	Gift of Gab	
1934	Embarrassing Moments	
1934	Great Expectations	
1934	Imitation of Life	
1934	There's Always Tomorrow	
1934	The Man Who Reclaimed His Head	
1935	The Good Fairy	
1935	The Mystery of Edwin Drood	
1935	Transient Lady	
1935	Bride of Frankenstein	
1935	Remember Last Night?	
1936	Show Boat	Final film
