= Once in a Lifetime (1932 film) =

1932 American film

- Directed by: Russell Mack
- Written by: Seton I. Miller (adaptation)
- Based on: play Once in a Lifetime by Moss Hart and George S. Kaufman
- Produced by: Carl Laemmle Jr.
- Starring: Jack Oakie; Sidney Fox; Aline MacMahon
- Cinematography: George Robinson
- Edited by: Robert Carlisle
- Distributed by: Universal Pictures
- Release date: October 2, 1932
- Running time: 91 minutes
- Country: United States
- Language: English

Once in a Lifetime is a 1932 American pre-Code comedy film based on the 1930 play Once in a Lifetime by Moss Hart and George S. Kaufman. The film was produced and distributed by Universal Pictures, directed by Russell Mack and stars Jack Oakie, Sidney Fox and Aline MacMahon.

It is preserved at the Library of Congress.

== Plot ==
The immense success of The Jazz Singer, the first all-talking picture, results in the cancellation of a booking for three song-and-dance vaudeville performers: Jerry Hyland, May Daniels and George Lewis. Jerry, convinced that talkies are the future, decides they will head to Hollywood to break into the fledgling movie industry before others get the same notion. May comes up with the idea to open a school of elocution to teach actors how to speak on film. On the train there, May encounters an old friend, Helen Hobart, an influential, nationally syndicated columnist. She offers to put them in touch with Herman Glogauer, the head of a major movie studio. George is smitten with another passenger, aspiring young actress Susan Walker.

They discover the movie world to be an eccentric place. George is unexpectedly appointed by Glogauer as supervisor of production, allowing him to promote Susan's career. Despite his incompetence (or rather because of it), his first picture turns out to be a critical and commercial smash hit, and Susan becomes a star.

Later, a very persuasive salesman gets George to buy 2000 airplanes, which causes Glogauer to fire him. However, air movies become very popular, and George has inadvertently cornered the market. The other studios are desperate to get airplanes from Glogauer at any price, and George is once again considered a genius.

== Cast ==
- Jack Oakie as George Lewis
- Sidney Fox as Susan Walker
- Aline MacMahon as May Daniels
- Russell Hopton as Jerry Hyland
- Louise Fazenda as Helen Hobart
- ZaSu Pitts as Miss Leighton
- Gregory Ratoff as Herman Glogauer
- Jobyna Howland as Mrs. Walker
- Onslow Stevens as Lawrence Vail
- Gregory Gaye as Rudolph Kammerling
- Eddie Kane as Meterstein
- Johnnie Morris as Weiskopf
- Frank LaRue as The Bishop
- Margaret Lindsay as Dr. Lewis' Secretary
- Alan Ladd as Projectionist (uncredited)
- Mona Maris as Phyllis Fontaine (uncredited)

== Reception ==
Mordaunt Hall, film critic of The New York Times, gave the film a favorable review, calling it a "merry diversion". He praised all the main performers, as well as ZaSu Pitts as the studio's obtuse receptionist.
