= Night Work (1930 film) =

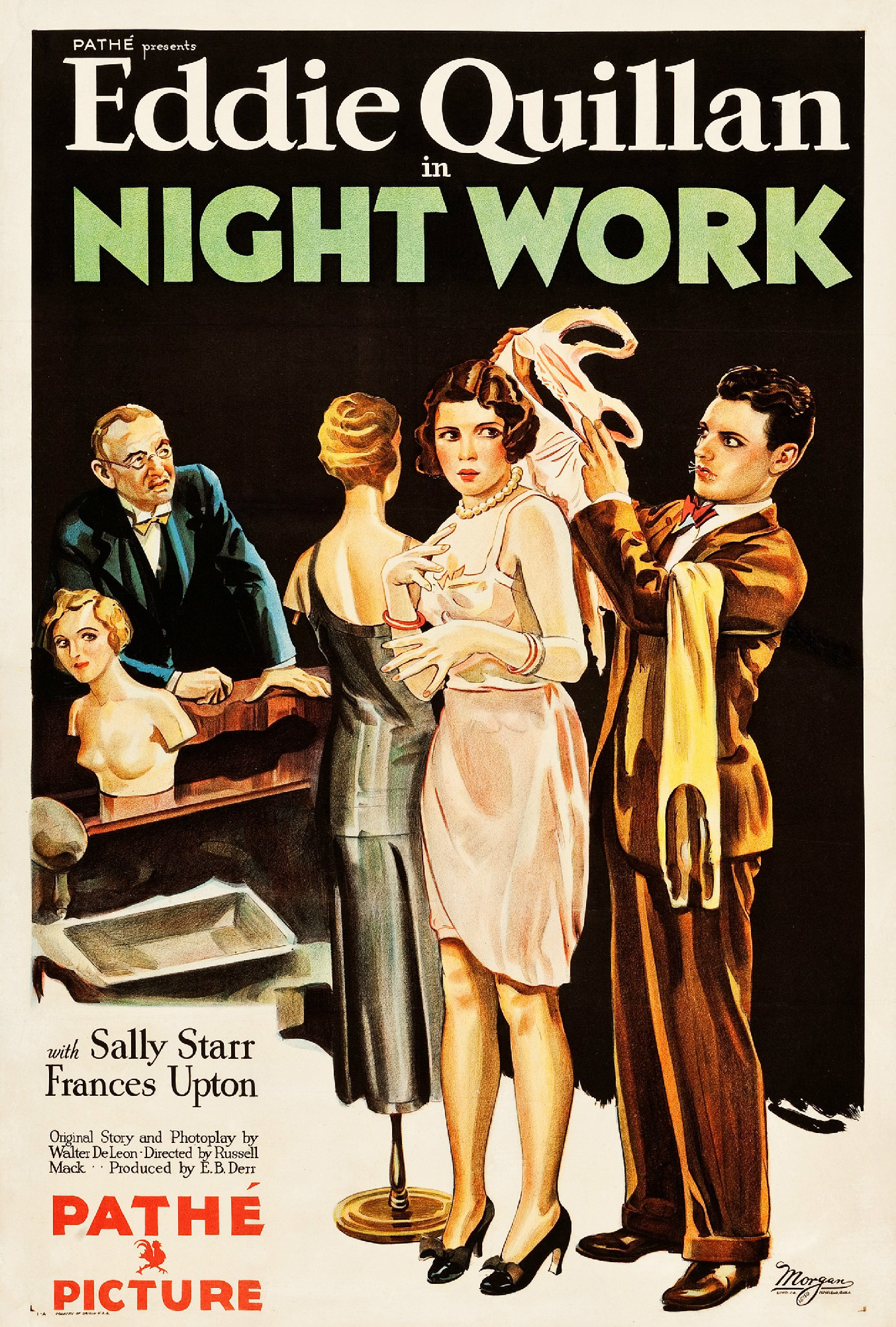
- Directed by: Russell Mack
- Screenplay by: Walter DeLeon
- Produced by: E.B. Derr
- Cinematography: John J. Mescall
- Edited by: Joseph Kane
- Music by: Josiah Zuro
- Production company: Pathé
- Release date: August 3, 1930 (USA)
- Running time: 93 Minutes
- Country: United States
- Language: English

Night Work is a 1930 American pre-Code comedy film starring Eddie Quillan, Sally Star, and Frances Upton. The film was directed by Russell Mack.

== Plot ==
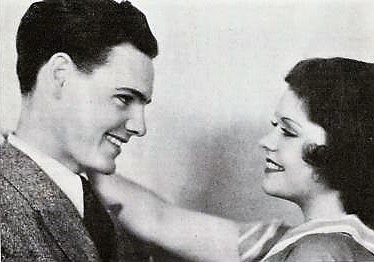
Quillan and Starr in Night Work

Willie Musher is an assistant window dresser for a department store who is the unlucky chump who is fired each time a disgruntled customer complains to the manager, Mr. Reisman. Willie is given ten dollars by the husband of one of the complainers as a tip for lying so well, and he leaves the store to deposit the money in his bank account.

Outside in the street there is a drive to raise funds for a local orphanage, and Willie meets a pretty nurse named Mary Robbins, and a cute orphan boy named Oscar. Willie accidentally agrees to pledge weekly support of ten dollars, which is more than he can afford.

Store clerk, Aggie, goes to the window dressing department to invite Willie to a picnic on Sunday the following day, but he explains to her that he needs to go to the orphanage to withdraw his support as Sunday is visiting day at the orphanage. Aggie stays too long and Mr. Reisman joins them to do some paperwork. Reisman insists that Willie continue undressing "the dummy" (Aggie) and Willie is compelled to take her dress off.

Willie borrows a cutaway suit and top hat from one of the store's dummies and visits the orphanage with the intention to withdraw his sponsorship. While there he sees Mary, who is impressed that he is supporting an orphan, and visits with Oscar the orphan. Willie reveals to Mary that he was also an orphan and ran away at 15 to support himself and leads her to believe he is rich. Also visiting is a couple with the intention to adopt, and is shown several children, however they are not interested in Oscar since little is known about the boy except that he was brought to the facility on April 1.

Outside the orphanage there is a car with a flat tire, and as the cabdriver changes the tire he explains to the couple inside the car, Pinky and Trixie, that he drove a woman to this place several years ago on April 1 to leave a child there. After the woman goes inside the orphanage the cabdriver finds a ring on the floor of the car with the inscription "H.V. to V.H.". Pinky makes a note of the inscription in his notebook. Still inside the orphanage, Willie agrees to continue sponsoring the child somehow.

Willie gets a second job at a nightclub and struggles to stay awake, and while Willie is waiting on Harvey Vanderman's table, Trixie tells Pinky about Harvey's first wife, Violet Harris and that Harvey and Violet had eloped but Harvey's father had the marriage annulled. Pinky realizes that the ring may have been given to Violet by Harvey and decides to write a letter.

Harvey receives a letter informing him he has a child at the orphanage, his father Mr. Vanderman, decides to look into the matter. Mrs. Ten Eyck informs Willie and Mary that a millionaire is interested in adopting Oscar and Mary encourages him not to let the man walk all over him. Willie agrees to adopt Oscar if Mary will be his wife. The following Sunday Harvey and his father pay a visit to Oscar with the intention of adopting him. Willie is not able to raise the money to adopt Oscar, he reluctantly gives up any claim to him and accepts that the Vanderman's will be adopting him. Harvey recalls that Willie is a waiter at a nightclub and Mary is heartbroken over being misled and she and Willie break up.

Back at the department store Mr. Reisman asks Calloway, the head window dresser, who dressed the baby and toy windows, Calloway sarcastically informs him that Willie did. After Calloway leaves, Reisman tells his secretary and Willie is now the head window dresser. Calloway tells Willie Reisman wants to see him, but Willie thinks he's in trouble and goes into the office prepared to give him a piece of his mind and does so. Reisman promotes him instead of firing him much to Willie's surprise. Willie bargains for the same pay as Calloway and a two hundred dollar advance on his pay for the adoption as well as the afternoon off.

Willie goes to the orphanage with the two hundred dollars and stands his ground against Mr. Vanderman, and suggests Oscar may not have been the only baby dropped off on April 1. Soon it is discovered that there was another baby dropped off with a wedding ring tied to his wrist with the inscription "H.V. to V.H.", but had already been adopted by a couple from London. Before Vanderman leaves he suggest Willie and Mary get married, and they and Oscar think that's a great idea.

== Cast ==
- Eddie Quillan as Willie
- Sally Star as Mary
- Frances Upton as Aggie
- Tom Keene as Harvey Vanderman (as George Duryea)
- Robert McWade as Phil Reisman
- Robert Edeson
- John T. Murray as Calloway
- Addie McPhail as Trixie
- Georgia Caine as Mrs. Ten Eyck
- Douglas Scott as Oscar, the Orphan
- Tom Dugan
