= The Band Plays On (film) =

1934 film by Russell Mack

- Film poster
- Directed by: Russell Mack
- Screenplay by: Bernard Schubert; Ralph Spence; Harvey Gates
- Story by: Byron Morgan; J. Robert Bren
- Based on: The Gravy Game; 1933 story in The Saturday Evening Post by Harry Stuhldreher; W. Thorton Martin
- Produced by: Ned Marin
- Starring: Robert Young; Stuart Erwin; Leo Carrillo; Betty Furness; Ted Healy; Preston Foster
- Cinematography: Leonard Smith
- Edited by: William LeVanway
- Music by: Score: Oscar Radin; Songs: Burton Lane (music); Harold Adamson (lyrics)
- Production company: Metro-Goldwyn-Mayer
- Distributed by: Metro-Goldwyn-Mayer
- Release date: December 21, 1934
- Running time: 85 minutes
- Country: United States
- Language: English

The Band Plays On is a 1934 American drama film directed by Russell Mack and written by Bernard Schubert, Ralph Spence and Harvey Gates. The film stars Robert Young, Stuart Erwin, Leo Carrillo, Betty Furness, Ted Healy and Preston Foster. The film was released on December 21, 1934, by Metro-Goldwyn-Mayer.

== Cast ==
- Robert Young as Tony Ferrera
- Stuart Erwin as Stuffy Wilson
- Leo Carrillo as Angelo
- Betty Furness as Kitty O'Brien
- Ted Healy as Joe O'Brien
- Preston Foster as Howdy Hardy
- Russell Hardie as Mike O'Brien
- William Tannen as Rosy Rosenberg
- Robert Livingston as Bob Stone
- Norman Phillips Jr. as Stuffy as a Boy
- David Durand as Tony as a Boy
- Sidney Miller as Rosy as a Boy
- Beaudine Anderson as Mike as a Boy
- Betty Jane Graham as Kitty as a Girl
- Joe Sawyer as Mr. Thomas
- Henry Kolker as Professor Hackett
