= Steamboat Round the Bend =

1935 film directed by John Ford

- Film poster by Joseph A. Maturo
- Directed by: John Ford
- Written by: Ben Lucien Burman; Dudley Nichols; Lamar Trotti
- Produced by: Sol M. Wurtzel
- Starring: Will Rogers; Anne Shirley
- Cinematography: George Schneiderman
- Edited by: Alfred DeGaetano
- Production company: Fox Film Corporation
- Distributed by: 20th Century Fox
- Release date: September 6, 1935
- Running time: 82 minutes
- Country: United States
- Language: English
- Box office: $1,528,000 (rentals)

Steamboat Round the Bend is a 1935 American comedy film directed by John Ford, released by 20th Century Fox and produced by Fox Film Corporation, based on the 1933 novel of the same name by author Ben Lucien Burman. It was the final film made by star Will Rogers and was released posthumously, a month after he was killed in an airplane crash on August 15, 1935.

== Plot ==
A con man enters his steamboat in a winner-take-all steamboat race in the 1890s with a rival while attempting to find an eyewitness that will save his nephew, who has been wrongly convicted of murder, from the gallows.

Doctor John Pearly, who sells Pocahontas patent medicine that is mostly pure alcohol, buys a broken down paddleboat steamer and intends to spend his sunset years leisurely cruising the Mississippi River with his nephew Duke as crewman. Duke shows up with a young uneducated girl, Fleety Belle, in tow, saying he has killed a man who forced his attentions on her. It seems to be a clear case of self-defense and having faith in the Justice System, Rogers convinces Duke to give himself up to the local sheriff, Rufe Jeffers.

Jeffers is a good natured butterball who does his best to make Duke comfortable under the circumstances, including putting on musical saw concerts for his fellow inmates. Pearly isn't pleased with Fleety Belle's presence. But when her cruel, whip-wielding father arrives to drag her home, Pearly chases him off with a carving knife. They are friends from then on, and he teaches her to be an apt co-pilot of the Steamboat. His only other help is eternally pickled Efe and eternally inept Jonah.

The Sheriff has generously turned over the contents of a bankrupt wax museum to Pearly, and he moves the statues to his ship. The floating museum raises the needed $500.00 to pay for Duke's appeal. When an ugly mob threatens the ship, the crew assembles Western outlaw mannequins along the deck and the mob is cowed into retreat. Duke's appeal is turned down and he is to be taken to Baton Rouge for execution. Before they leave, Duke and Fleety are married in a jailhouse ceremony where the phrase "Till Death Do You Part" has a definite double meaning.

There was a witness who can clear Duke, an anti-Demon Rum itinerant preacher named New Moses. But he is intinerant in the worst sense of the word. Pearly decides his last hope is to sail to Baton Rouge and petition the State's Governor. But he runs into a logjam—a huge steamboat race is being prepared. When Pearly hears the Governor will be awarding the first prize trophy, he enters the race.If he wins, he'll have the Governor's undivided attention.

The ramshackle entry draws the raucous scorn of veteran Captain Eli---and they end up betting each other's boats on the outcome. Halfway through the race, Pearly spots New Moses holding a revival meeting on the riverbank. Pearly literally lassos him and pulls him into the water and aboard ship. Moses joins the crew when he hears the purpose of this.

When Pearly's boat runs low on fuel, they first cannibalize the wooden ship. Then when Moses discovers Pearly's liquor tonic on the ship, he throws it into the fire. The ship leaps to the finish line, powered by alcohol. Since the hanging had been delayed so everyone could watch the race, Pearly and The Governor make it to the prison in the nick of time.

== Cast ==
- Will Rogers as Doctor John Pearly
- Anne Shirley as Fleety Belle
- Irvin S. Cobb as Captain Eli
- Eugene Pallette as Sheriff Rufe Jeffers
- John McGuire as Duke
- Berton Churchill as New Moses
- Francis Ford as Efe
- Roger Imhof as Breck's Pappy
- Raymond Hatton as Matt Abel
- Hobart Bosworth as Chaplain
- Stepin Fetchit as Jonah
- John Lester Johnson as Jonah's Uncle Jeff (uncredited)
- Charles Middleton as Fleety Belle's Father(uncredited)
- Ferdinand Munier as The Governor (uncredited)
- Del Henderson as Salesman (uncredited)
- Fred Kohler Jr. as Fleety Belle's Jilted Fiancé' (uncredited)
- Lois Verner as Addie May, Little Girl Playing Piano (uncredited)

== Home video ==
Steamboat Round the Bend was released as a region 1 DVD in 2006.
