= The Boudoir Diplomat =

1930 film

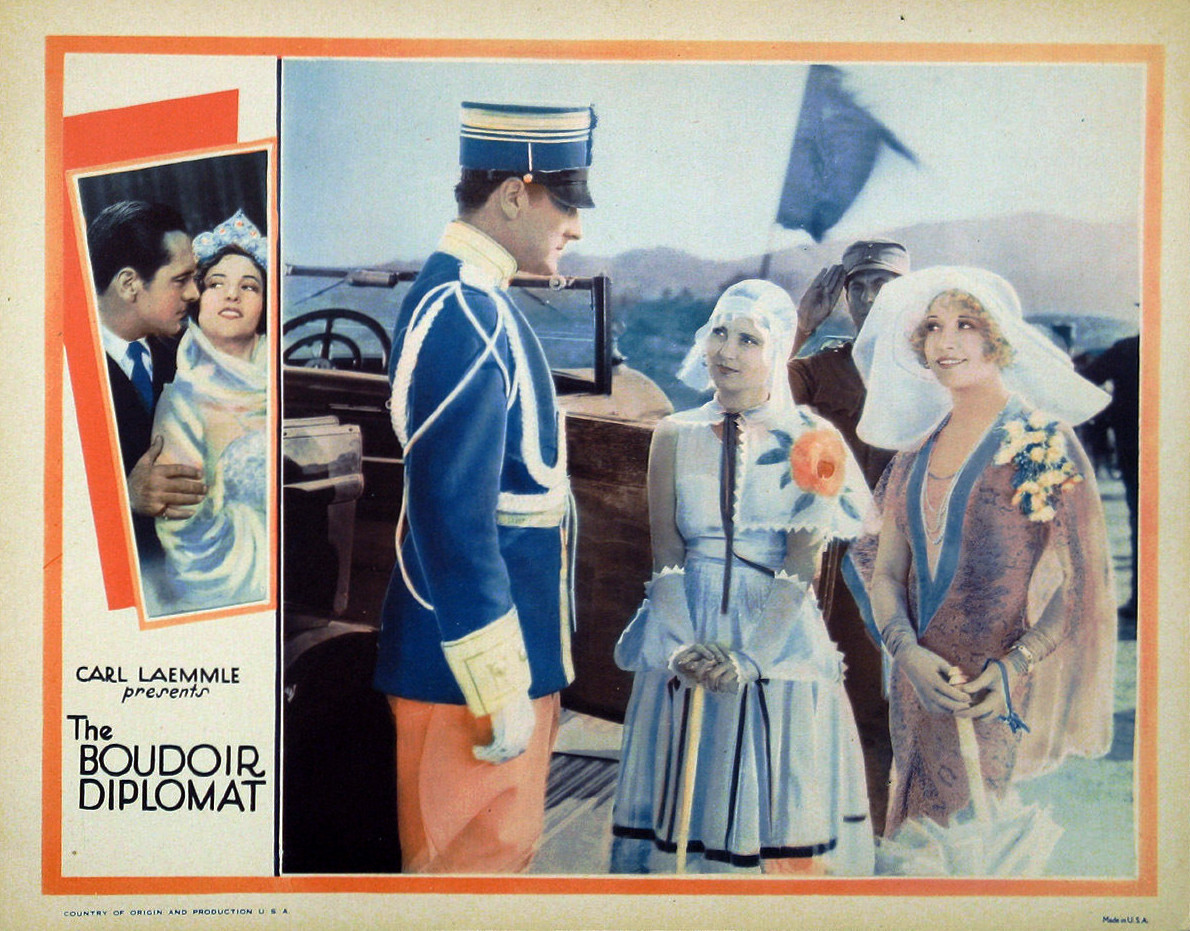
- Lobby card
- Directed by: Malcolm St. Clair
- Written by: Fritz Gottwald (play); Rudolph Lothar (play); Benjamin Glazer; Tom Reed
- Produced by: Carl Laemmle Jr.
- Starring: Betty Compson; Mary Duncan; Ian Keith
- Cinematography: Karl Freund
- Edited by: Maurice Pivar
- Music by: Heinz Roemheld (uncredited)
- Production company: Universal Pictures
- Distributed by: Universal Pictures
- Release date: December 5, 1930
- Running time: 68 minutes
- Country: United States
- Language: English

The Boudoir Diplomat is a 1930 American pre-Code romantic comedy film directed by Malcolm St. Clair, produced and distributed by Universal Pictures, from the play The Command To Love by Fritz Gottwald and Rudolph Lothar.

The film is preserved at the Library of Congress.

== Plot ==
Baron Belmar, a French military attaché in Madrid who romantically pursues the wives of various government officials. Helene and Mona are the objects of his attention.

== Cast ==
- Betty Compson as Helene
- Ian Keith as Baron Belmar
- Mary Duncan as Mona
- Jeanette Loff as Greta
- Lionel Belmore as War Minister
- Lawrence Grant as Ambassador
- George Beranger as Potz

== Reception ==
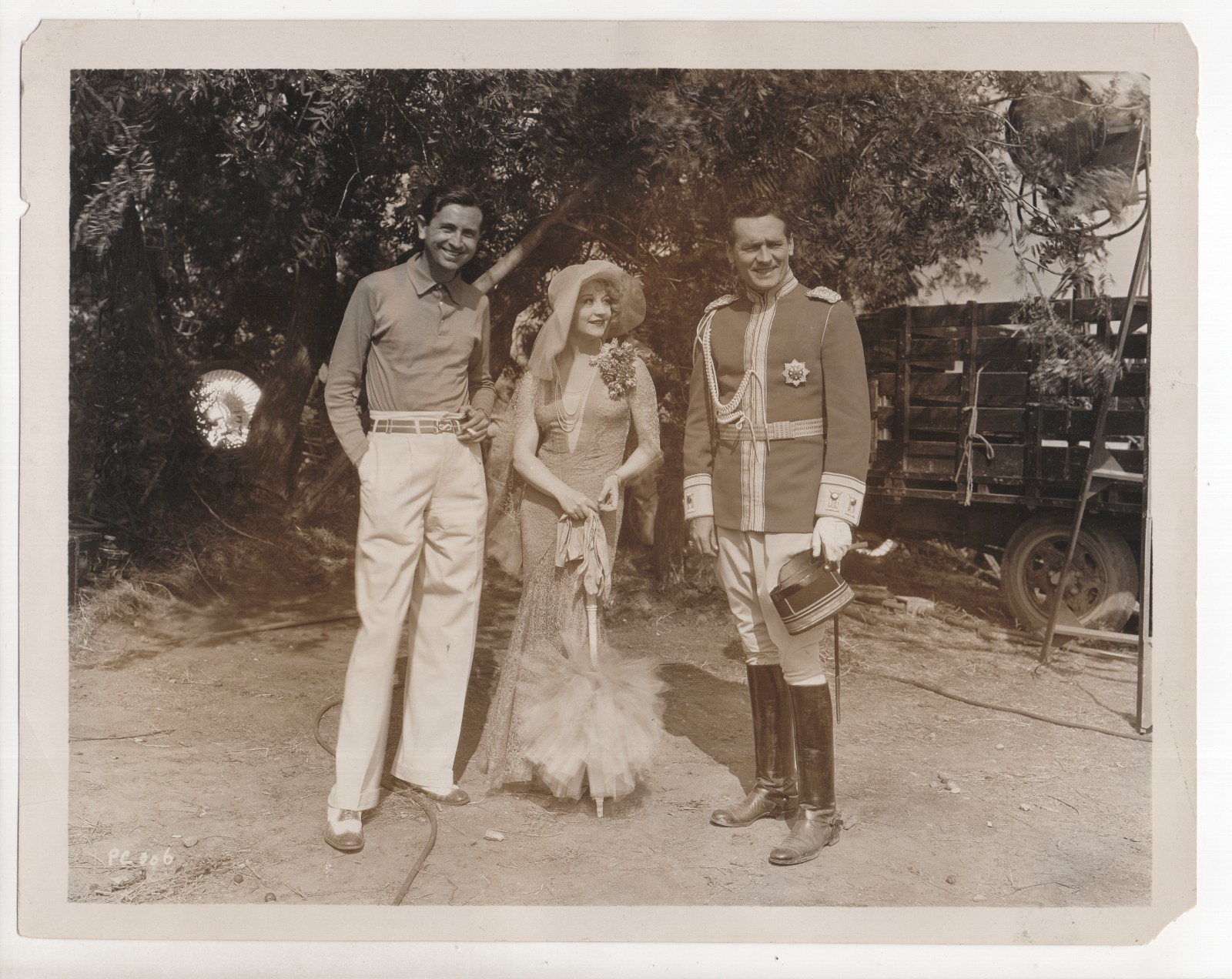
St. Clair Compson Keith on location

The film opened to much fanfare on December 5, 1930. According to Mordaunt Hall of the New York Times, The Boudoir Diplomat is a “diverting comedy [that] more than meets one's expectations, particularly when one considers the censorable incidents—so far as films are concerned—of the stage offering.” Acknowledging that the stage version is superior to the screen adaption, Hall notes that director St. Clair salvaged the “essentials” of the play including its humour.

Reviewer “Wagy" at Variety was less impressed with the adaption, and found that censor restrictions inhibited St. Clair in presenting the details of marital infidelities on screen that had been frankly presented on stage. “Wagy" noted that sexual play was reduced to “flashes of undies and other silken things” reminiscent of a “fashion reel” rather than sexual play.

== Alternate Version ==
The film was remade during production into three alternate-language versions. Boudoir diplomatique was the French-language version, starring Iván Petrovich and Arlette Marchal. It was directed by Marcel De Sano and released in 1931, and is not likely to have been screened publicly in the United States. A Spanish-language version of Boudoir Diplomat was released on February 13, 1931 as Don Juan diplomático. It was co-directed by George Melford (he would direct the 1931 Spanish-language version of Drácula) with Enrique Tovar Ávalos, and starred Miguel Faust Rocha, Lia Torá and Celia Montalván. Liebe auf Befehl, co-directed by Johannes Riemann and Ernst L. Frank, was the German-language version, starring Riemann along with Tala Birell and Olga Chekhova.
