= The Meanest Gal in Town =

1934 film by Russell Mack

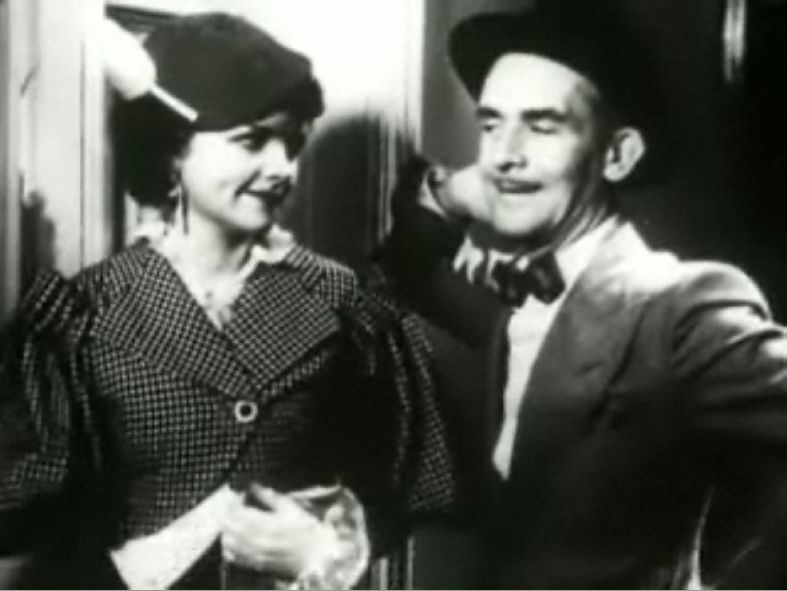
- Pert Kelton and James Gleason in the film trailer
- Directed by: Russell Mack; Ray Lissner (assistant)
- Screenplay by: Richard Schayer; Russell Mack; H. W. Hanemann
- Story by: Arthur T. Horman
- Produced by: Russell Mack; Merian C. Cooper (associate)
- Starring: Zasu Pitts; El Brendel; Pert Kelton; James Gleason
- Cinematography: J. Roy Hunt
- Edited by: James B. Morley
- Music by: Max Steiner
- Production company: RKO Radio Pictures
- Release date: January 12, 1934 (US)
- Running time: 62 minutes
- Country: United States
- Language: English

The Meanest Gal in Town is a 1934 American Pre-Code romantic comedy, directed by Russell Mack from a screenplay written by Richard Schayer, Russell Mack, and H. W. Hanemann, and starring Zasu Pitts, El Brendel, Pert Kelton, and James Gleason.

== Cast ==
- Zasu Pitts as Tillie Prescott
- Pert Kelton as Lulu White
- El Brendel as Chris Peterson
- James Gleason as Duke Slater
- Richard "Skeets" Gallagher as Jack Hayden (credited as "Skeets" Gallagher)
- Edward McWade as Clark - Tillie's Clerk
- John Carradine as Stranded Actor (uncredited)
- Wallis Clark as Mr. Bowen - Barbershop Customer (uncredited)
- Bud Geary as Loafer (uncredited)
- Frank Hagney as Angry Truck Driver (uncredited)
- Harry Holman as Brookville's Mayor (uncredited)
- DeWitt Jennings as Police Chief (uncredited)
- Lew Kelly as Man with Poster in Barbershop (uncredited)
- Vera Lewis as Woman at Mayor's Outing (uncredited)
- Bob McKenzie as Kingston Hotel Owner (uncredited)
- Florence Roberts as Mom - Old Stranded Actress (uncredited)
- Harry Semels as Handcar Driver with Lulu (uncredited)
- Morgan Wallace as Sydney Sterling (uncredited)
