= The Spirit of Notre Dame =

1931 film

- Theatrical release poster
- Directed by: Russell Mack
- Screenplay by: Walter DeLeon; Robert Keith; Richard Schayer; Dale Van Every
- Produced by: Carl Laemmle, Jr.
- Starring: Lew Ayres; Sally Blane; William Bakewell; Andy Devine; Harry Barris; J. Farrell MacDonald
- Cinematography: George Robinson
- Edited by: Robert Carlisle
- Production company: Universal Pictures
- Distributed by: Universal Pictures
- Release date: October 13, 1931
- Running time: 80 minutes
- Country: United States
- Language: English

The Spirit of Notre Dame is a 1931 American drama film directed by Russell Mack, written by Walter DeLeon, Robert Keith, Richard Schayer and Dale Van Every, and starring Lew Ayres, Sally Blane, William Bakewell, Andy Devine, Harry Barris and J. Farrell MacDonald. It was released on October 13, 1931, by Universal Pictures.

== Plot ==
Incoming student Edward “Bucky” O'Brien, a star football player from Hockerville High in North Dakota, arrives on the Notre Dame campus and is introduced to his new roommate, Jim Stewart, a member of the Fighting Irish track team.

Bucky's first practice with the football team is awkward, as he is not used to blocking for other backs, and his runs are, for the most part, effectively countered by the defense. However, his grit and determination inspire Jim, who observes the practice from the sidelines, inducing him to try out for the football team.

Despite the inauspicious start, Bucky works hard and becomes a valuable contributor to the team. In their junior year, both Bucky and Jim are left halfbacks. Although Bucky is the better player, the Notre Dame head coach switches him to right halfback, a less glamorous position, because he is a better blocker than Jim. Bucky readily accepts this turn of events, but Jim resists because he believes the change will affect Bucky's chances to be selected an All-American. Bucky convinces him that the good of the team counts more than that of the individual, and Jim eventually acquiesces.

The change proves to be highly effective, as Jim becomes a bona fide star running back for the team with the aid of Bucky's blocking. However, the publicity and adulation eventually go to Jim's head, and relations between Bucky and him become so strained that Bucky moves out of their room.

Another friend, tackle Ernest “Truck” McCall, finally has a chance to play in a game against Northwestern, and even though his rib is broken, he continues playing until he collapses and it is discovered that his lung is punctured. In the same game, Bucky, overcome with bitterness against Jim, decides to demonstrate how much his success depends on Bucky's blocking techniques. On two successive plays, he neglects to block, leaving Jim unable to make the goal. When the coach discovers what Bucky has done, he orders him off the team.

During the next game against Army, Notre Dame is losing as Bucky watches the game from the stands. He soon realizes that if he were in the game, his team might have a chance to win. After heading down to the team's locker room, he overhears the coach talking to Truck, who is in the hospital with pneumonia. Bucky and the team learn that while Truck is fighting for his life, he is also listening to the game on the radio, imploring the team to dig down deep to overcome adversity. This fills the team with a new resolve to achieve victory for their beloved friend and teammate. Bucky dresses for the game and joins the team on the sideline.

Though the coach is surprised by his appearance, he allows Bucky to return to his old position on the team. With a renewed sense of purpose, Bucky enters the game and blocks for Jim, enabling him to score the winning touchdown. In the locker room afterward, the team learns that Truck has recovered from his illness, and Jim and Bucky patch up their friendship.

== Cast ==
- Lew Ayres as Bucky O'Brien
- Sally Blane as Peggy
- William Bakewell as Jim Stewart
- Andy Devine as Truck McCall
- Harry Barris as Wasp
- J. Farrell MacDonald as Coach
- Frank Carideo as himself
- Don Miller, Elmer Layden, Jim Crowley, and Harry Stuhldreher as the Four Horsemen
- Nat Pendleton as assistant coach
- Adam Walsh as himself
- Bucky O'Connor as himself
- John Law as himself
- Moon Mullins as himself
- Art McManmon as himself
- Al Howard as himself
- John B. O'Brien as himself
