= Film Superlist =

Film Superlist: Motion Pictures in the U.S. Public Domain is a series of reference books created by attorney Walter Hurst about the copyright status of films.

Each Film Superlist volume contains the main text of the Cumulative Copyright Catalog of Motion Pictures for the period covered. Each entry has the title, copyright registration number, and copyright registration date. For films that were renewed, the renewal registration number and date have been added. Under United States copyright law, films registered prior to 1964 required renewal during the 28th year following registration in order to continue copyright protection in the U.S. The United States Copyright Office published renewals in its semi-annual copyright catalogs for all renewals through the end of 1977.

Following Hurst's death, publication of the Film Superlist books was continued by the Hollywood Film Archive. The current Film Superlist editor is D. Richard Baer.

In reviewing the 1992 updated edition of Film Superlist 1940–1949, Library Journal stated, "This volume, part of a three-volume set, updates and emends the excellent earlier (1979) edition by Walter Hurst. With the main text derived from the U.S. Copyright Office's Catalogue of Copyright Entries: Motion Pictures 1940–1949, editor Baer assists the user in ascertaining the copyrighted status of 18,767 films copyrighted in the United States from 1940 to 1949."

Despite the book's existence, its notations do not supersede actual copyright information as provided by the United States Copyright Office.

== See also ==
- Public domain film
- List of films in the public domain in the United States
- List of animated films in the public domain in the United States
- United States Copyright Office
