= Heaven on Earth (1931 film) =

1931 film

- Directed by: Russell Mack
- Written by: Ben Lucien Burman; Ray Doyle; Robert Keith
- Produced by: Carl Laemmle Jr. Maurice Pivar
- Starring: Lew Ayres; Anita Louise; Harry Beresford
- Cinematography: Charles J. Stumar
- Edited by: Milton Carruth
- Music by: Bernhard Kaun
- Distributed by: Universal Pictures
- Release date: December 1, 1931
- Running time: 77 minutes
- Country: United States
- Language: English

Heaven on Earth is a 1931 American dramatic film directed by Russell Mack, based on the 1929 novel, Mississippi, by author Ben Lucien Burman. The film stars Lew Ayres as the estranged son of a Mississippi steamboat captain.

== Plot ==
In 1927, Captain Lilly is a steamboat captain who pilots a boat on the Mississippi River, with the help of his son, States. Along their route is a shantytown made up of houseboats, the residents of which often fight with the steamboat crowd.

After a shooting match between States and shanty-boater Chicken Sam, Sam reveals to States his true heritage: Captain Lilly killed States' real father - a shanty-boater - and adopted States as his own son. States confirms this fact with court records, and after leaving Captain Lilly, becomes a boarder on Aunt Vergie's houseboat. Vergie's daughter Towhead, falls in love with States and, understanding that he's homesick, sneaks onto Captain Lilly's steamboat and takes his dog, Shoo-Fly. States tries to get the dog to return to Captain Lilly, but Shoo-Fly insists on staying by his side. Later when Captain Lilly approaches States to ask him to come back, he sees Shoo-Fly and - believing that States kidnapped the dog - denounces him.

States then builds his own shanty-boat with a breakwater protecting it, only to have Captain Lilly drive his own steamboat into it, thinking it is creating a bar in the river. Unknown to Captain Lilly, Towhead, was in States' boat at the time, and she is injured during the crash.

States also plans to marry Towhead, but Captain Lilly has him institutionalized in a reform school when he hears of his plans. States is later freed from the institution by some of his friends and then borrows a gun with the intention of going after Captain Lilly and killing him.

In the meantime, the Mississippi River has begun to flood dangerously, and people from the nearby town have been trying to burn down the shantytown, prompting the shanty-boaters to release their boats from their moorings. States dives into the river, swimming for Aunt Vergie's boat. Captain Lilly follows with his steamboat, scanning the river with a searchlight. States finds Vergie and Towhead on their shantyboat and stays with them, boarding up the windows.

Captain Lilly catches sight of Aunt Vergie's shantyboat headed for a break in a levee and, realizing that it will likely be destroyed, saves the boat just before it reaches the break. Lilly continues to help other shanty-boaters, his former rivals, and by morning, States is back in Captain Lilly's pilot house with Towhead by his side.

== Cast ==
- Lew Ayres as States
- Anita Louise as Towhead
- Harry Beresford as Capt. Lilly
- Elizabeth Patterson as Aunt Vergie
- "Slim" Summerville as Merchant
- Alfred P. James as Butter Eye
- Harlan Knight as Preacher Daniel
- Charley Grapewin as Doc Boax
- John Carradine as Chicken Sam (billed onscreen as "Peter Richmond")
- Lew Kelly as Andy
- Jules Cowles as Buffalo
- Louise Emmons as Maggie
- Madame Sul-Te-Wan as Voo Doo Sue
- Bob Burns as Marty
- "Beans" as "Shoo-Fly"

== Critical reception ==
Upon its 1931 release, Mordaunt Hall of The New York Times noted that it was "a worthy and earnest pictorial version of Ben Lucien Burman's novel, Mississippi," stating that the film "is imbued with an impressive atmosphere, which is heightened by the sincerity of the portrayals of all concerned, especially Lew Ayres, Anita Louise, Harry Beresford and Elizabeth Patterson. It is a lethargic tale, for the most part, but one that reflects the mood of the people. There are the shootings, the desire for vengeance, the sudden hatreds and the weird superstitions."
