= Counsellor at Law =

1933 American pre-Code drama film

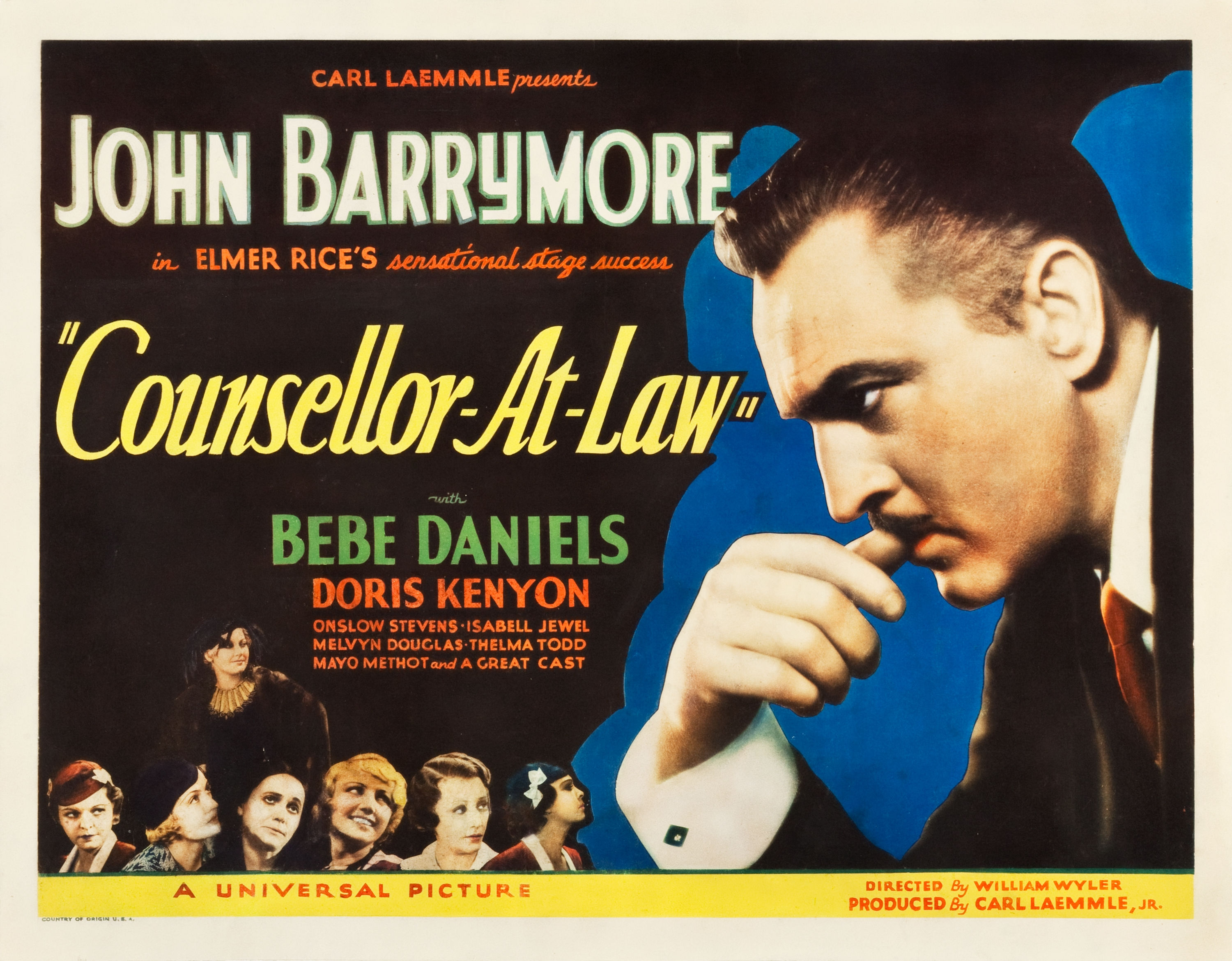
- original poster
- Directed by: William Wyler
- Screenplay by: Elmer Rice
- Based on: Counsellor-at-Law; 1931 play by Elmer Rice
- Produced by: Carl Laemmle, Jr.
- Starring: John Barrymore
- Cinematography: Norbert Brodine
- Edited by: Daniel Mandell
- Distributed by: Universal Pictures
- Release date: December 11, 1933 (US)
- Running time: 82 minutes
- Country: United States
- Language: English

Counsellor at Law is a 1933 American pre-Code drama film directed by William Wyler. The screenplay by Elmer Rice is based on his 1931 Broadway play of the same title.

== Plot ==
The story focuses on several days in a critical juncture in the life of George Simon, who rose from his humble roots in a poor Jewish ghetto on the Lower East Side of Manhattan to become a shrewd, highly successful attorney. Earlier in his career, he allowed a guilty client to perjure himself on the witness stand because he believed the man could be rehabilitated if freed. Rival lawyer Francis Clark Baird has learned about the incident and is threatening to expose George, which will lead to his disbarment. The possibility of a public scandal horrifies his socialite wife Cora, who plans to flee to Europe with Roy Darwin. Devastated by his wife's infidelity, George is about to leap from the window of his office in the Empire State Building when his secretary Regina, who is in love with him, comes to his rescue.

== Cast ==
- John Barrymore as George Simon
- Bebe Daniels as Regina Gordon
- Doris Kenyon as Cora Simon
- Isabel Jewell as Bessie Green
- Melvyn Douglas as Roy Darwin
- Onslow Stevens as John Tedesco
- Thelma Todd as Lillian La Rue
- Mayo Methot as Zedorah Chapman
- Vincent Sherman as Harry Becker
- Richard Quine as Richard Dwight, Jr.
- John Qualen as Johan Breitstein
- Angela Jacobs as Goldie

Cast notes

- Clara Langsner, J. Hammond Dailey, Malka Kornstein, Marvin Kline, T. H. Manning, John Qualen, Angela Jacobs, Elmer H. Brown and Conway Washburn reprised their roles from the Broadway production.
- Vincent Sherman made his film debut in Counsellor at Law. He had previously appeared in a Chicago production of the play.

== Production ==
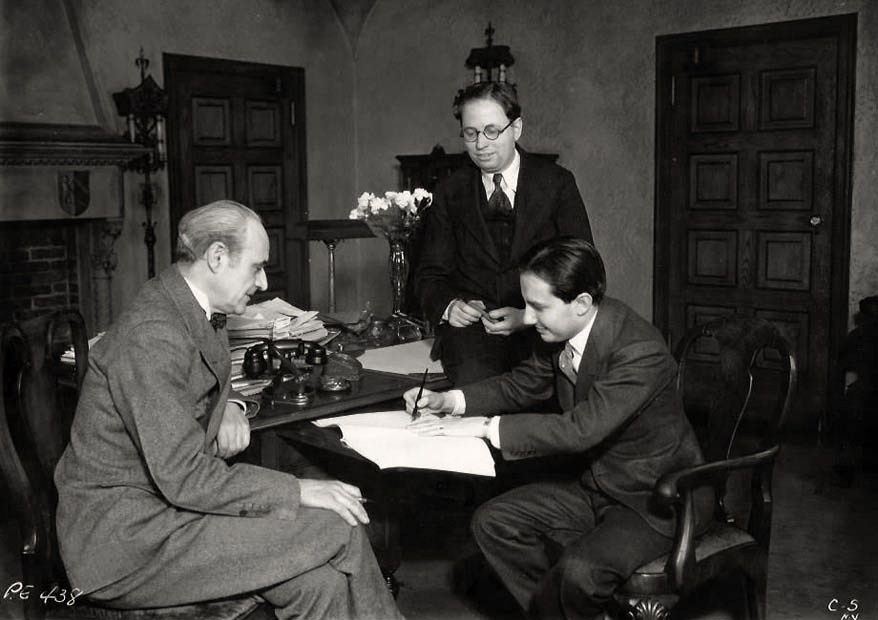
L. to. R. : Joseph P. Bickerton, Jr. (theatre producer), Elmer Rice (playwright) and Carl Laemmle Jr. (Universal producer) sign a contract for the film version of Counsellor at Law

After directing a series of films he considered inconsequential, William Wyler was happy to be assigned to a prestigious project based on a play that had enjoyed successful runs on Broadway and in Chicago, Los Angeles, and San Francisco. Producer Carl Laemmle Jr. paid $150,000 for the screen rights, an unusually high price tag during the Great Depression, and to ensure the film's success he hired Elmer Rice to adapt his own play.

In early August 1933, Wyler met Rice in Mexico City, where he was vacationing with his family, for preliminary discussions about the script. Rice was loath to mix business with pleasure and assured the director he would begin working as soon as his holiday ended. On August 22, he shipped a first draft from his New York office to Universal Pictures. Wyler approved of the screenplay, and principal photography was slated to begin on September 8.

Laemmle wanted to cast Paul Muni as George Simon, the role he had created on stage, but the actor declined because he feared being typecast as Jewish. Edward G. Robinson, Joseph Schildkraut, and William Powell were considered before Laemmle decided to cast against type and offer the role to John Barrymore in order to capitalize on his box office appeal. Both Wyler and Rice wanted to cast performers from the various stage productions, and although several screen tests were made, most of the roles were filled by studio contract players. Vincent Sherman, who had been in the Chicago production, was signed to reprise his small role of Harry Becker, a young radical with Communist leanings; he later became a prolific film and television director. Another cast member, Richard Quine, then 13, similarly went on to a career as a director, writer and producer.

Soon after filming began, Wyler realized much of the material Rice had excised from his play was necessary to build scenes, and he began incorporating it back into the screenplay. Eventually he worked with both the screenplay and play script at hand, a procedure he would follow when making The Little Foxes in later years.

Barrymore had signed for $25,000 per week, and Wyler was ordered to film all his scenes as quickly as possible. What should have taken two weeks ultimately took three-and-a-half because the actor could not remember his lines. After taking twenty-seven takes to complete one brief scene, Wyler decided to resort to cue cards strategically placed around the set. Also adding to delays was Barrymore's heavy drinking, which frequently gave his face a puffy appearance that required the makeup crew to tape his jowls. Between dealing with Barrymore and trying to comply with Laemmle's demands to complete the film on schedule and within the allotted budget, Wyler was tense and irritable and tended to take out his frustrations on the supporting cast.

Three months after filming began, the film opened to critical and commercial success at Radio City Music Hall on December 11, 1933.

== Reception ==
=== Box office ===
The film was a box office success, described by film historian Elizabeth Kendall as a "highbrow hit", although a November 1934 article in The New York Times termed it a commercial disappointment for Universal. The movie premiered at the Radio City Music Hall.

=== Critical reception ===
Mordaunt Hall of The New York Times said the film "moves along with lusty energy, the scenes being so complete that none of them seems a fraction of a minute too long. Parts of the stage work have perforce been omitted, but where this occurs Mr. Rice and the director, William Wyler, leave nothing in doubt." He praised Barrymore for giving his role "the vigor, imagination and authority one might expect" and added, "The characterization is believable and thoroughly sympathetic."

The Hollywood Reporter said the film proved "the value of having a playwright adapt his own brainchild to the screen." It also praised Wyler for giving it "a far better tempo than the play possessed" and added, "He milks each situation and lets it go without stressing . . . many scenes which could easily have ensnared a less capable director."

Years later, in a critique of Barrymore's career, Pauline Kael described his portrayal of George Simon as "one of the few screen roles that reveal his measure as an actor."
