= Joseph P. Bickerton Jr. =

American lawyer and theatrical producer

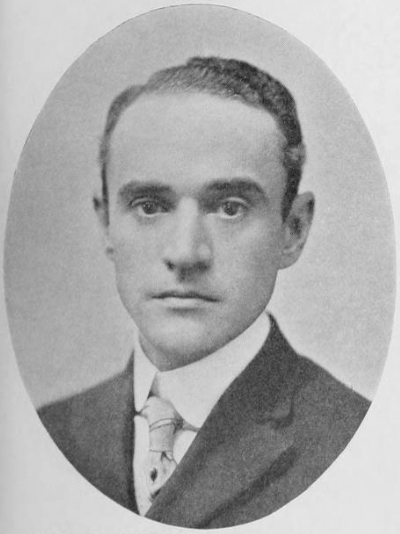
- Born: July 15, 1878; Newark, New Jersey, US
- Died: August 20, 1936 (aged 58); Mount Kisco, New York, US
- Education: Read law
- Occupation(s): Theatrical producer, lawyer
- Spouse: Lois E. Tabor (m. 1910)

Joseph Ponsford Bickerton Jr. (July 15, 1878 – August 20, 1936) was an attorney and theatrical producer.

== Early years and education ==
Joseph P. Bickerton Jr. was the son of Joseph Ponsford Bickerton, a salesman, and Emma P. Jaques. Joseph Junior studied at Princeton University, but had to leave for financial reasons during his freshman year. He became a lawyer after working in law offices without having attended law school.

Bickerton managed the career of actor Charley Grapewin, on tour with a play called Above the Limit. The play closed, leaving Bickerton with a full set of scenery on his hands. He thereupon sat down and wrote a play to fit the scenery, entitled The House on the Bluff, which was profitable. With the proceeds, he organized the Jungle Film Corporation in 1910 and bought the African hunt motion pictures which Paul J. Rainey, a wealthy explorer, had made during a pleasure expedition. These films were the first motion pictures to be produced at regular theater prices and were successful in the U.S. and abroad.

== Attorney and producer ==
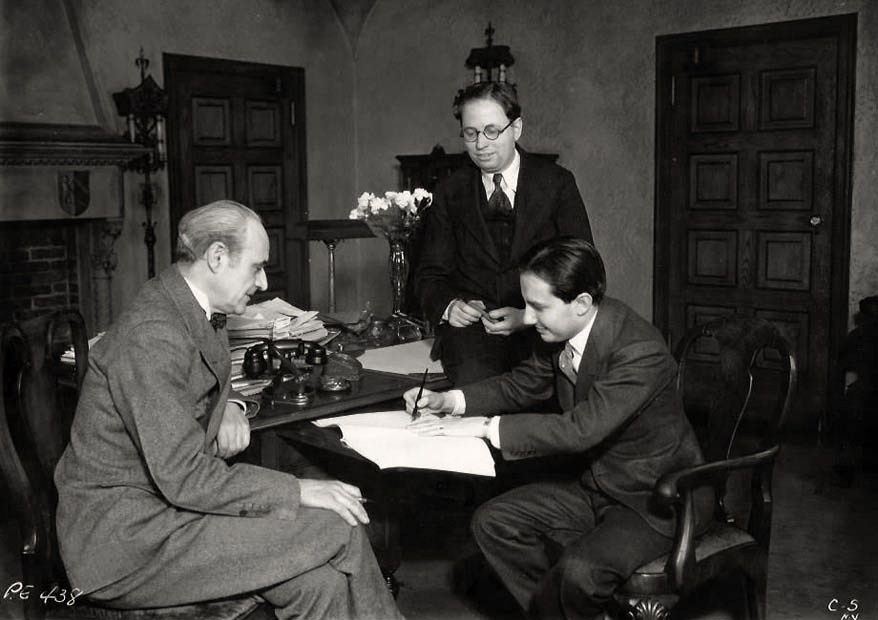
L. to. R.: Joseph P. Bickerton Jr. (theatre producer), Elmer Rice (playwright) and Carl Laemmle Jr. sign a contract for the film version of Counsellor at Law

Among Bickerton's clients were Florenz Ziegfeld, David Belasco, Elmer Rice, George Abbott, Philip Dunning, Sidney Kingsley and Ed Wynn. Bickerton was the producer of the musical Adele and Rice's play Counsellor at Law. Bickerton also produced The Vortex, Noël Coward's debut on Broadway. As a producer, Bickerton seldom allowed his name to appear.

== Arbitrator ==
Bickerton enjoyed the confidence of producers, actors and playwrights to such a degree that they brought him their disputes to arbitrate. Bickerton devised the minimum basic agreement in 1926, which ended the struggle over the screen sale of stage plays at a time when the playwrights were talking of a strike against the producers. Thereafter Bickerton was elected and re-elected during the last ten years of his life to be the arbiter of any further disputes between members of the Dramatists Guild of America and the producing managers. The sales of all their stage shows to Hollywood from 1926 until Bickerton's death passed through his hands.

== Death ==
Bickerton died in Mount Kisco, New York on August 20, 1936.

== Family ==
Bickerton's wife, Lois Tabor, had been an actress for David Belasco and a model for artist Howard Chandler Christy.
