= Russell Mack =

American stage actor, then film director and producer

- Born: Edward Russell Mahoney; November 11, 1892; Oneonta, New York, United States
- Died: June 1, 1972 (aged 79); New York City, New York, United States
- Occupations: Performer, director, actor, producer
- Years active: 1911-1944

Russell Mack (November 11, 1892 – June 1, 1972) was an American vaudeville performer in the 1910s and a stage actor, film director, and producer in the 1920s and 1930s.

== Vaudeville and stage career ==
Born Edward Russell Mahoney in Oneonta, New York, Mack was raised in Providence, Rhode Island, where he worked first as a reporter and then as a theatre manager. In 1911, he formed a vaudeville duo with pianist Blanche Vincent, and they toured as “Mack and Vincent” with some success on the Orpheum circuit, in addition to managing cabarets in New York City. Vincent was often identified as Mack's wife, but there is no confirmation that they actually married. The duo disbanded in 1919, and Mack embarked on a stage career, with brief returns to vaudeville in 1921–22. After a minor role in a show by Oscar Hammerstein II, Joan of Arkansaw, which changed its name to Always You, in the week before it opened on Broadway on January 5, 1920, he was featured in The Gingham Girl (1923–24). Thereafter he starred in almost a dozen productions on Broadway. His credits included the successful musical My Girl (1924–25); The Four Flusher (1924–25), which he also produced; Square Crooks, a 1926 comedy; and another successful comedy, The Little Spitfire (1926–27). His final performance was as the lead in a 1927 farce, Storm Center.

== Film career ==
With the onset of talking pictures, Mack moved to Hollywood, where his first credit was for writing the script for the 1929 film Rio Rita, which would become the most successful film of the year for the newly formed studio RKO Radio Pictures. Staying at RKO, he moved into directing for his next project, the 1930 domestic drama, Second Wife. After Second Wife, he moved over to Pathé Exchange, where he directed Night Work, before writing and directing Big Money later that year. When Pathé and RKO merged in 1931, he would direct one film for them, Lonely Wives, before signing with Universal Pictures. Over the next three years, Mack would direct six films for Universal, including the film version of the Moss Hart and George S. Kaufman play Once in a Lifetime in 1932. In 1934, he returned to RKO, where he wrote, directed, and produced The Meanest Gal in Town. Although he was slated to direct several films between 1933 and 1935, his final screen credit was for The Band Plays On in 1934 for MGM.

== Later life ==
In 1942, Mack returned to the East Coast, where he and his second wife, Bobette, managed the Mosque Theater in Newark, New Jersey. The couple had one daughter; Mack also had a daughter by a previous marriage. Mack remained in the East in retirement and died on June 1, 1972, in New York City at the age of 79.

== Filmography ==
(as per AFI's database)

| Year | Title | Role | Notes |
|---|---|---|---|
| 1929 | Rio Rita | Screenwriter | |
| 1930 | Big Money | Director, screenwriter | |
| 1930 | Night Work | Director | |
| 1930 | Second Wife | Director | |
| 1931 | Lonely Wives | Director | |
| 1931 | Heaven on Earth | Director | |
| 1931 | The Spirit of Notre Dame | Director | |
| 1932 | The All American | Director | |
| 1932 | Once in a Lifetime | Director | |
| 1932 | Scandal for Sale | Director | |
| 1932 | Private Jones | Director | |
| 1934 | The Band Plays On | Director | |
| 1934 | The Meanest Gal in Town | Director, writer, producer | |
