= Once in a Lifetime (play) =

1930 play by Moss Hart and George S. Kaufman

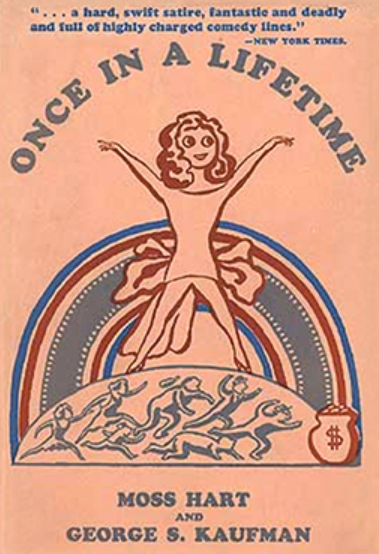
- First edition book cover (Farrar & Rinehart 1930)
- Original language: English
- Written by: Moss Hart; George S. Kaufman
- Subject: Hollywood Golden Age
- Genre: Satirical comedy
- Setting: A hotel room in New York City; A Pullman car en route to California; Herman Glogauer Studio, Hollywood

Premiere
- Date: September 24, 1930
- Place: Music Box Theatre; New York City

Once in a Lifetime is a 1930 play by Moss Hart and George S. Kaufman, the first of eight on which they collaborated in the 1930s.

Hart wrote the original three-act play in 1929. When he shopped it around, producer Sam Harris arranged for Kaufman to work with Hart on several revisions and rewrites.

Hart was a 25-year-old unknown at the time. Kaufman was quite renowned, and it was his name on the marquee which drew in the audiences. At the end of the Broadway opening night, a resounding success which received numerous curtain calls, Kaufman stepped forward and gave a one-line curtain speech, "I would like this audience to know that eighty percent of this play is Moss Hart."

== Plot ==
A satirical comedy, Once in a Lifetime focuses on the effect talking pictures have on the entertainment industry. When the New York City vaudevillean team of Jerry Hyland, May Daniels, and George Lewis find themselves in a faltering vaudeville act, they decide to head west and present themselves as elocution experts in the hope someone will hire them to train actors unaccustomed to speaking on screen. On the train they meet gossip columnist Helen Hobart, who introduces them to megalomaniac film mogul Herman Glogauer when they arrive in Hollywood.

The trio's misadventures include encounters with Lawrence Vail, a New York City playwright driven to distraction and eventually a sanatorium by studio bureaucracy and a lack of work to keep him busy; silent screen beauties Phyllis Fontaine and Florabel Leigh, whose voices sound like nails on a blackboard; two pages in 18th-century dress who periodically arrive carrying placards with announcements about Glogauer's latest doings; a ditzy receptionist who wears an evening gown to work; and aspiring actress (and proverbial dumb blonde) Susan Walker and her chaperoning stage mother.

Dimwitted George becomes a director who shoots the wrong script, forgets to turn on the soundstage lights, and audibly cracks nuts during filming, yet his movie is called a masterpiece and he is declared a genius by trend-conscious journalists who believe he is ahead of his time.

== Productions ==
Following problematic tryouts in Atlantic City and Brighton Beach, and a series of major rewrites including an entirely new third act written at the last minute by Moss Hart, the original Broadway production, directed by George S. Kaufman, opened at the Music Box Theatre on September 24, 1930. It was an immediate success, and ran for 406 performances, lasting two weeks shy of a year.

The cast included Grant Mills as Jerry Hyland, Jean Dixon as May Daniels, Hugh O'Connell as George Lewis, Spring Byington as Helen Hobart, Charles Halton as Herman Glogauer, Janet Currie as Phyllis Fontaine, Eugenie Frontai as Florabel Leigh, Sally Phipps as Susan Walker, and Kaufman as Lawrence Vail, a role Moss Hart essayed later in the run.

Hart's agent at this time was Frieda Fishbein, who subsequently brought a lawsuit against Hart contending she was entitled to a percentage of royalties from plays produced by Harris. The matter was settled out of court in 1940 for an undisclosed amount.

=== Revivals ===
A Broadway revival directed by Tom Moore opened at the Circle in the Square Theatre on June 15, 1978 following 21 previews and ran for 85 performances. The cast included John Lithgow as George Lewis, Deborah May as May Daniels, Treat Williams as Jerry Hyland, Jayne Meadows as Helen Hobart, George S. Irving as Herman Glogauer, Lee Meredith as Florabel Leigh, Julia Duffy as Susan Walker, Michael Jeter as one of the pages, and Max Wright, who won the Theatre World Award for his portrayal of Lawrence Vail.

In 1979, Trevor Nunn directed a Royal Shakespeare Company production at the Aldwych Theatre in London, with a cast that included David Suchet, Richard Griffiths, Zoë Wanamaker, Peter McEnery, Ian Charleson, Juliet Stevenson, and David Bradley. Gillian Lynne notably staged the elaborate John Napier scene changes and an unforgettable fifteen-minute tap-dancing finale. Nunn was nominated for an Olivier Award for his direction.

A London production directed by Edward Hall opened at the Royal National Theatre on December 5, 2005, and ran until March 11, 2006. It featured David Suchet as Herman Glogauer, Adrian Scarborough as George Lewis, and Victoria Hamilton as May Daniels.

A 2016 production at the Young Vic theatre in London marked the stage debut of television comedy performer Harry Enfield in a version directed by Richard Jones.

== Adaptations ==
The play was sold to Hollywood. The film version was released by Universal Studios in 1932, starring Jack Oakie, Sidney Fox, Louise Fazenda, Aline MacMahon, and Zasu Pitts.
