= The Cat and the Canary =

The Cat and the Canary may refer to:

- The Cat and the Canary (play), a 1922 play by John Willard
- The Cat and the Canary (1927 film), a 1927 silent film by Paul Leni, based on the play
- The Cat and the Canary (1939 film), a 1939 remake of the 1927 film starring Bob Hope
- The Cat and the Canary (1961 film), a 1961 Swedish television film based on the 1927 film
- The Cat and the Canary (1978 film), a 1979 British remake of the 1927 film by Radley Metzger
- "The Cat and the Canary" (Justice League Unlimited episode), 2005
