= Elizabeth Patterson (actress) =

American actress (1874–1966)

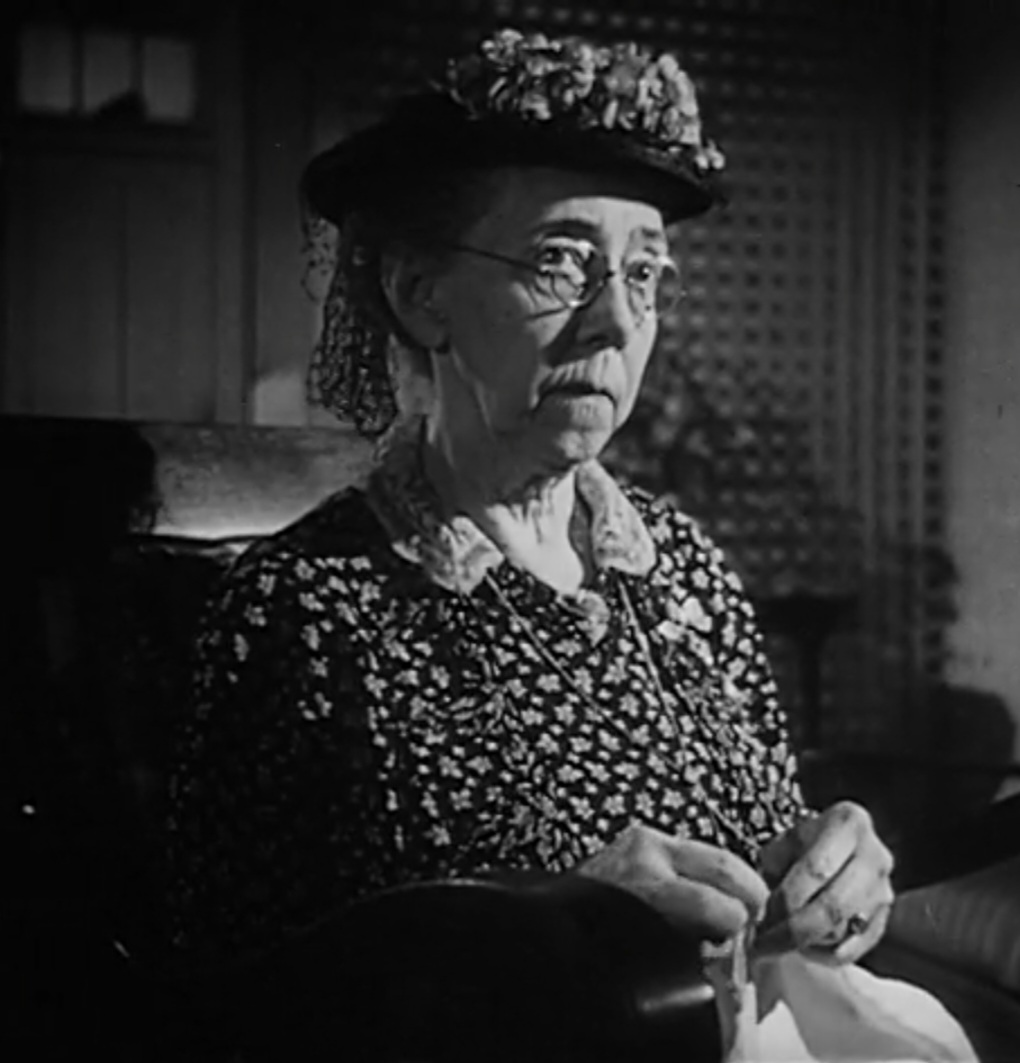
- Patterson in Intruder in the Dust (1949)
- Born: Mary Elizabeth Patterson; November 22, 1874; Savannah, Tennessee, U.S.
- Died: January 31, 1966 (aged 91); Los Angeles, California, U.S.A.
- Resting place: Savannah Cemetery, Savannah, Tennessee
- Occupation: Actress
- Years active: 1890–1961

Mary Elizabeth Patterson (November 22, 1874 – January 31, 1966) was an American theatre, film, and television character actress who gained popular recognition late in her career playing the elderly neighbor Matilda Trumbull on the television comedy series I Love Lucy.

== Early years ==
Born in Savannah, Tennessee, she was the child of Mildred (née McDougal) and Edmund D. Patterson, a Confederate army veteran. Federal census records document that her father by 1880 was a lawyer and residing with his wife and children in the home of his father-in-law, Garrick Archibald McDougal, a widower, who was also a lawyer and farmer in Savannah. That same census lists Elizabeth as the second child of the Pattersons' four offspring. She had an older sister, Annie Belle, and two younger brothers, Edmund and Archie.

== Stage ==
She was educated at Tennessee colleges in Pulaski and Columbia, where her participation in campus theater groups fostered a growing passion for drama. Her parents soon sent her to Europe in hopes of diminishing her interest in theater; yet, Patterson's determination to become an actress was only reinforced during those travels, especially in Paris, where she attended productions of the Comédie Française.

After returning from Europe, Patterson used money from a small inheritance to move to Chicago. There she joined a theatrical troupe and subsequently toured with repertory companies. In 1913, she made her Broadway debut in the play Everyman. She remained active in New York City theatre through 1954.

Broadway theatre credits of Elizabeth Patterson
Title	Year	Role	Theatre	Notes	Ref(s)
Everyman	1913		Children's Theatre	A 15th Century morality play	
The Family Exit	1917		Comedy Theatre		
In the Zone	1917		Comedy Theatre		
Jonathan Makes a Wish	1918		Princess Theatre		
A Night in Avignon	1919		Punch & Judy Theatre		
The Piper	1920	Old Ursula	Fulton Theatre		
The Intimate Strangers	1921-1922	Aunt Ellen	Henry Miller Theatre	Starring production for Billie Burke; Produced by Florence Ziegfeld written by Booth Tarkington	
The Lady Cristilinda	1922-1923	Froggy	Broadhurst Theatre		
Magnolia	1923	Madame Rumford	Liberty Theatre		
Gypsy Jim	1924	Mary Blake	49th Street Theatre		
Lazybones	1924	Rebecca Fanning	Vanderbilt Theatre		
The Book of Charm	1925	Mrs. Harper	Comedy Theatre		
A Puppet-Play	1926	The Queen	Nora Bayes Theatre		
Spellbound	1927	Mrs. Underwood	Earl Carroll Theatre		
Paradise	1927-1928	Margaret, Mrs. Elder	48th Street Theatre		
Carry On	1928	Aunt Mary Marston	Theatre Masque		
Rope	1928	Mrs. Roxie Biggers	Biltmore Theatre		
Box Seats	1928	Mrs. Slocum	Hayes Theater		
The Marriage Bed	1929	Caroline Reid	Booth Theatre		
Man's Estate	1929	Minnie Jordan	Biltmore Theatre		
Solid South	1930	Geneva	Lyceum Theatre		
Her Master's Voice	1933-1934	Mrs. Martin	Plymouth Theatre		
Spring Freshet	1934	Clementina Lynch	Plymouth Theatre		
Yankee Point	1942	Miz Bekins	Longacre Theatre		
But Not Goodbye	1944	Amy Griggs	48th Street Theatre		
His and Hers	1954	Avis	48th Street Theatre		

== Film ==
In 1926, at the age of 51, Patterson was cast in her first movie, a silent film, The Boy Friend. Transitioning successfully into the era of "talkies", she remained a very busy actress in Hollywood throughout the 1930s, averaging more than five films a year during that decade, usually in supporting roles. A few of her screen credits at that time include Tarnished Lady; Husband's Holiday; A Bill of Divorcement; So Big!; The Story of Temple Drake; Hold Your Man; Remember the Night; Dinner at Eight; High, Wide, and Handsome; and No Man of Her Own. She also appeared in the role of Susan in two adaptations of John Willard's popular play The Cat and the Canary: The Cat Creeps in 1930 and The Cat and the Canary in 1939.

Patterson continued to perform frequently in the 1940s, when she was cast in more than 30 additional films. Among her notable roles is her 1949 portrayal of the heroic character Eunice Habersham in the groundbreaking racial crime drama Intruder in the Dust, a film based on the William Faulkner novel of the same name and set in the Deep South. Although she would appear in a few more feature films in the 1950s, such as Washington Story and Pal Joey, Patterson by then began to focus her work increasingly on roles in the rapidly expanding medium of television.

Feature-length films of Elizabeth Patterson
Title	Year	Role	Notes	Ref(s)
The Boy Friend	1926	Mrs. Harper	MGM	
The Return of Peter Grimm	1926	Mrs. Bartholomey	Fox Film	
The Dancing Town	1928	Ma Pepperall; 20-minute short significant as the film debut of Humphrey Bogart	Paramount Pictures; Preserved at the UCLA Film & Television Archive	
The Gay Nineties, or, The Unfaithful Husband	1929	Town Gossip	Vitaphone short	
Words and Music	1929	Dean Crockett	Fox Film	
South Sea Rose	1929	Sarah	Fox Film	
The Lone Star Ranger	1930	Sarah Martin	Fox Film; Preserved at the UCLA Film & Television Archive	
The Cat Creeps	1930	Susan	Universal Pictures	
The Big Party	1930	Goldfarb	Fox Film	
Harmony at Home	1930	Haller	Fox Film	
The Smiling Lieutenant	1931	Baroness von Schwedel (uncredited)	Paramount Pictures; Preserved at the UCLA Film & Television Archive	
Penrod and Sam	1931	Teacher (uncredited)	Warner Bros.	
Husband's Holiday	1931	Mrs. Caroline Reid	Paramount Pictures	
Daddy Long Legs	1931	Mrs. Lippett	Fox Film	
Tarnished Lady	1931	Mrs. Courtney	Paramount Pictures	
Heaven on Earth	1931	Aunt Vergie	Universal Pictures	
New Morals for Old	1932	Aunty Doe	MGM	
They Call It Sin	1932	Mrs. Cullen	First National Pictures	
Guilty as Hell	1932	Elvira Ward	Paramount Pictures	
A Bill of Divorcement	1932	Hester	RKO Radio Pictures	
The Expert	1932	Miss Crackenwald	Warner Bros.	
Man Wanted	1932	Harper, Lois' secretary	Warner Bros.	
Love Me Tonight	1932	First Aunt	Paramount Pictures; Preserved at the UCLA Film & Television Archive	
No Man of Her Own	1932	Mrs. Randall	Paramount Pictures	
So Big	1932	Mrs. Tebbit (uncredited)	Warner Bros.	
Breach of Promise	1932	Cora Pugmire	Sono Art-World Wide Pictures	
Miss Pinkerton	1932	Juliet Mitchell	First National Pictures	
Life Begins	1932	Mrs. Tubby (uncredited)	First National Pictures	
The Conquerors	1932	Roger's Landlady (uncredited)	RKO Radio Pictures	
They Just Had to Get Married	1932	Aunt Lizzie	Universal Pictures	
Infernal Machine	1933	Elinor's Aunt	Fox Film; Preserved at the UCLA Film & Television Archive	
The Story of Temple Drake	1933	Aunt Jennie	Paramount Pictures	
Hold Your Man	1933	Miss Tuttle	MGM	
Secret of the Blue Room	1933	Mary, the cook	Universal Pictures	
Dinner at Eight	1933	Miss Copeland	MGM	
Doctor Bull	1933	Aunt Patricia Banning	Fox Film	
Golden Harvest	1933	Lydia	Paramount Pictures	
Ever in My Heart	1933	Clara Tuttle, Canteen Worker (uncredited)	Warner Bros.	
Hide-Out	1934	'Ma' Miller	MGM	
Chasing Yesterday	1935	Mlle. Prefere	RKO Radio Pictures	
So Red the Rose	1935	Mary Cherry	Paramount Pictures	
Men Without Names	1935	Aunt Ella	Paramount Pictures	
Her Master's Voice	1936	Mrs. Ellie Martin	Walter Wanger Productions	
Timothy's Quest	1936	Vilda Cummins	Paramount Pictures	
Small Town Girl	1936	Ma Brannan	MGM	
The Return of Sophie Lang	1936	Araminta Sedley	Paramount Pictures	
Three Cheers for Love	1936	Wilma Chester	Paramount Pictures	
Old Hutch	1936	Mrs. Sarah Hutchins	MGM	
Go West, Young Man	1936	Aunt Kate Barnaby	Paramount Pictures	
Night of Mystery	1937	Mrs. Tobias Greene	Paramount Pictures	
High, Wide, and Handsome	1937	Grandma Cortlandt	Paramount Pictures	
Hold 'em Navy!	1937	Grandma Stackpole	Paramount Pictures	
Night Club Scandal	1937	Mrs. Elvira Ward	Paramount Pictures	
Scandal Street	1938	Ada Smith	Paramount Pictures	
Bulldog Drummond's Peril	1938	Aunt Blanche Clavering	Paramount Pictures	
Bluebeard's Eighth Wife	1938	Aunt Hedwige	Paramount Pictures	
Sing, You Sinners	1938	Mrs. Daisy Beebe aka Mother Beebe	Paramount Pictures	
Sons of the Legion	1938	Grandmother Lee	Paramount Pictures	
Bulldog Drummond's Secret Police	1939	Aunt Blanche Clavering	Paramount Pictures	
The Story of Alexander Graham Bell	1939	Mrs. Mac Gregor	20th Century Fox	
Bulldog Drummond's Bride	1939	Aunt Blanche Clavering	Paramount Pictures	
Our Leading Citizen	1939	Aunt Tillie	Paramount Pictures	
The Cat and the Canary	1939	Aunt Susan	Paramount Pictures	
Bad Little Angel	1939	Mrs. Perkins	MGM	
Remember the Night	1940	Aunt Emma	Paramount Pictures; Preserved at the UCLA Film & Television Archive	
Adventure in Diamonds	1940	Nellie	Paramount Pictures	
Earthbound	1940	Becky Tilden	20th Century Fox	
Anne of Windy Poplars	1940	Rebecca	RKO Radio Pictures	
Who Killed Aunt Maggie?	1940	Aunt Maggie Ambler	Republic Pictures	
Michael Shayne, Private Detective	1940	Aunt Olivia	20th Century Fox	
Tobacco Road	1941	Ada Lester	20th Century Fox	
Kiss the Boys Goodbye	1941	Aunt Lily Lou Bethany	Paramount Pictures	
Belle Starr	1941	Sarah	20th Century Fox	
The Vanishing Virginian	1942	Grandma	MGM	
Almost Married	1942	Aunt Matilda Manning	Universal Pictures	
Beyond the Blue Horizon	1942	Mrs. Daly	Paramount Pictures	
Her Cardboard Lover	1942	Eva	MGM	
My Sister Eileen	1942	Grandma Sherwood	Columbia Pictures	
Lucky Legs	1942	Annabelle Dinwiddie	Columbia Pictures	
I Married a Witch	1942	Margaret	Paramount Pictures	
The Sky's the Limit	1943	Mrs. Fisher	RKO Radio Pictures	
Follow the Boys	1944	Annie	Universal Pictures	
Hail the Conquering Hero	1944	Aunt Martha	Paramount Pictures	
Together Again	1944	Jessie	Columbia Pictures	
Lady on a Train	1945	Aunt Charlotte Waring	Universal Pictures	
Colonel Effingham's Raid	1946	Cousin Emma	20th Century Fox	
The Secret Heart	1946	Mrs. Stover	MGM	
I've Always Loved You	1946	Mrs. Sompter	Republic Pictures; Preserved at the UCLA Film & Television Archive	
Welcome Stranger	1947	Mrs. Gilley	Paramount Pictures	
Out of the Blue	1947	Miss Spring	Eagle-Lion Films	
The Shocking Miss Pilgrim	1947	Catherine Dennison	20th Century Fox	
Miss Tatlock's Millions	1948	Cora	Paramount Pictures	
Song of Surrender	1949	Mrs. Beecham	Paramount Pictures	
Little Women	1949	Hannah	MGM	
Intruder in the Dust	1949	Miss Eunice Habersham	1949 premiere-1950 general release MGM	
Bright Leaf	1950	Tabitha Singleton	Warner Bros.	
Katie Did It	1951	Aunt Priscilla Wakely	Universal Pictures	
Washington Story	1952	Miss Dee	MGM	
Las Vegas Shakedown	1955	Mary Raff	William F. Broidy Pictures	
Pal Joey	1957	Mrs. Casey	Columbia Pictures	
The Oregon Trail	1959	Maria Cooper	20th Century Fox	
Tall Story	1960	Connie	Warner Bros.	

== Television ==
In 1952, at the age of 77, Patterson made her first appearance on the hit CBS-TV sitcom I Love Lucy in the episode "The Marriage License". In that installment, Patterson's character, Mrs. Willoughby, is married to the Greenwich, Connecticut, justice of the peace (played by character actor Irving Bacon) who remarries Lucy and Ricky Ricardo. In that role, she most notably sings an off-key version of "I Love You Truly" during the wedding ceremony. The following year she was cast in a featured guest role as Mrs. Matilda Trumbull in the episode "No Children Allowed". Patterson's character of Mrs. Trumbull was initially an ornery curmudgeon who resided in the same New York apartment building as the Ricardos. In that installment, she threatened to make trouble for the Ricardos since the building did not allow children. At the end of the episode, however, her character softens as she holds for the first time the Ricardos' baby, "Little Ricky"; and, as a result, Mrs. Trumbull becomes friends with both the Ricardos and the building's owners, Fred and Ethel Mertz.

Patterson's character on I Love Lucy proved to be so popular among viewers, as well as useful to the writers of the series, that she continued in the role for three more years, often serving in episode storylines as a convenient babysitter for "Little Ricky". In the fall of 1956, with I Love Lucy in its final season, Patterson made her last appearance as Mrs. Trumbull in "Little Ricky Learns to Play the Drums". Her character was mentioned one last time in the 1957 episode "Lucy Raises Chickens". In that installment, Fred and Ethel decide to follow the Ricardos and move to Connecticut to be near them, and Mrs. Trumbull's sister moves into 623 East 68th Street to manage the apartment building for the Mertzes.

I Love Lucy credits of Elizabeth Patterson
Episode	Date	Role	Ref(s)
"Marriage License"	April 7, 1952	Mrs. Willoughby	
"No Children Allowed"	April 20, 1953	Mrs. Matilda Trumbull	
"Lucy's Last Birthday"	May 11, 1953	Mrs. Trumbull	
"Never Do Business with Friends"	June 29, 1953	Mrs. Trumbull	
"Too Many Crooks"	November 30, 1953	Mrs. Trumbull	
"Business Manager"	October 4, 1954	Mrs. Trumbull	
"Ricky's Movie Offer"	November 8, 1954	Mrs. Trumbull	
"California, Here We Come"	January 10, 1955	Mrs. Trumbull	
"Homecoming"	November 7, 1955	Mrs. Trumbull	
"Bon Voyage"	January 16, 1956	Mrs. Trumbull	
"Little Ricky Learns to Play the Drums"	October 8, 1956	Mrs. Trumbull	

Elizabeth Patterson television credits excluding I Love Lucy
Program	Date	Notes	Ref(s)
The Chevrolet Tele-Theatre	March 20, 1950	Episode: "The Walking Stick"	
Pulitzer Prize Playhouse	December 1, 1950	Episode: "Our Town"	
Studio One in Hollywood	December 25, 1950	Aunt March; Episode: "Little Women"	
Three Lives (Short)	1953	United Jewish Appeal	
General Electric Theater	November 29, 1953	Madame Elaine; Episode: "The Marriage Fix"	
Lux Video Theatre	September 2, 1954	Dr. Gilley; Episode: "Welcome Stranger"	
Stage 7	February 13, 1955	Grandmother; Episode: The Legacy	
The Adventures of Huckleberry Finn	1955	TV movie Aunt Polly	
Adventures of Superman	1955-1956	Episodes: Mrs. Peabody "Olsen's Millions" (June 4, 1955); Mrs. Clara Exbrook "The Unlucky Number" (February 25, 1956)	
The Star and the Story	January 21, 1956	Amy Carey; Episode: "The Unforgivable"	
Crossroads	December 14, 1956	Episode:"Tenement saint"	
The Adventures of Jim Bowie	October 18, 1957	Episode "Fortune for Madame"	
Alfred Hitchcock Presents	March 30, 1958; November 15, 1959	Season 3 Episode 26: "Bull in a China Shop" (1958) as Miss Bessie; Season 5 Episode 8: "The Blessington Method" (1959) as Grandmother	
Johnny Stacatto	October 29, 1951	Episode: Evil	
Playhouse 90	January 10, 1957, May 7, 1959, July 18, 1961	Episodes: "The Ninth Day", "Diary of a Nurse", "Tomorrow"	
The Barbara Stanwyck Show	February 13, 1961	Millicent Melvane; Episode: "Big Career"	

== Personal life and death ==
Patterson, who never married, lived at the Hollywood Roosevelt Hotel during her 35-year film and television career. On January 31, 1966, she died at age 91 in Los Angeles of complications from pneumonia. Her gravesite is in Savannah Cemetery in her hometown in Tennessee.

== Bibliography ==
- Monush, Barry (2003). Screen World Presents the Encyclopedia of Hollywood Film Actors: From the silent era to 1965. Hal Leonard Corporation. ISBN 978-1-55783-551-2.
- Muir, John Kenneth (2008). The Encyclopedia of Superheroes on Film and Television, 2d ed. McFarland. ISBN 978-0-7864-3755-9.
