= The Cat Creeps (1930 film) =

1930 film by Rupert Julian

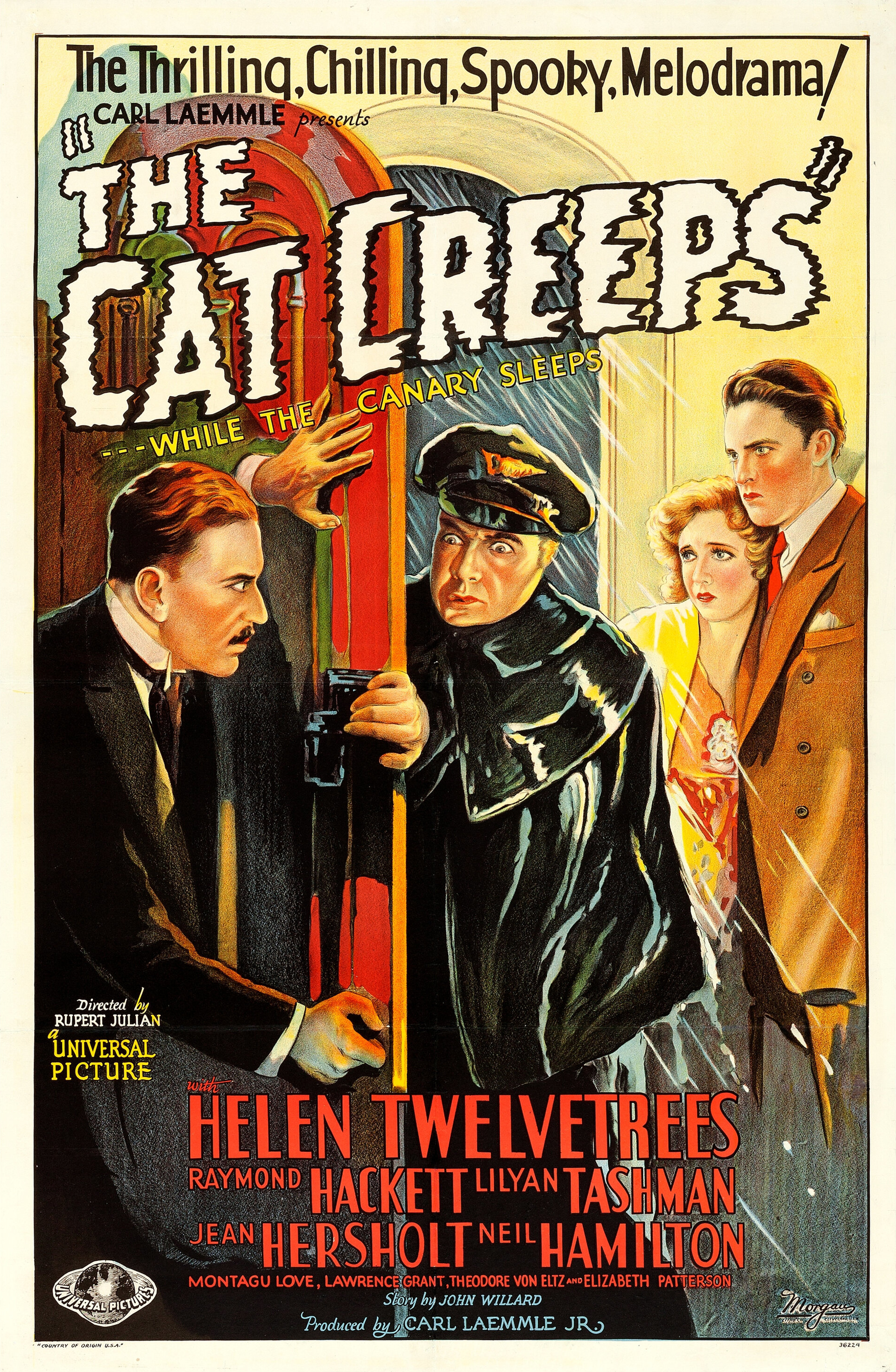
- Directed by: Rupert Julian
- Screenplay by: Gladys Lehman
- Based on: The Cat and the Canary by John Willard
- Starring: Helen Twelvetrees; Raymond Hackett; Neil Hamilton; Elizabeth Patterson
- Cinematography: Hal Mohr; Jerome Ash
- Edited by: Maurice Pivar
- Production company: Universal Pictures
- Distributed by: Universal Pictures
- Release date: November 7, 1930 (New York)
- Running time: 71 minutes
- Country: United States

The Cat Creeps is a 1930 American pre-Code mystery film directed by Rupert Julian based on the 1922 play The Cat and the Canary by John Willard. The film is a sound remake of The Cat and the Canary (1927). Starring Helen Twelvetrees, Raymond Hackett, Neil Hamilton, Lilyan Tashman, Jean Hersholt, Elizabeth Patterson, and Montagu Love.

Developed as a remake, Universal Pictures initially tried to re-cast Laura La Plante from The Cat and the Canary, but on finding her unavailable re-titled the film to The Cat Creeps. While filming was done during the day, the sets were used at night for a Spanish-language version of the film titled La Voluntad del Muerto. The Cat Creeps was first shown in New York on November 7, 1930, and received critical acclaim from contemporary reviews.

Prior to 2025, only two minutes of footage were known to exist in the 1932 Universal short film Boo!. Additional footage was rediscovered in 2025. The Vitaphone Soundtrack Project released a complete reconstruction on YouTube in 2026 using the original Vitaphone discs and extant film fragments along with film stills.

== Plot ==
Disappearances and strange goings-on in a spooky old mansion.

== Cast ==
- Helen Twelvetrees as Annabelle West
- Raymond Hackett as Paul
- Neil Hamilton as Charles Wilder
- Lilyan Tashman as Cicily
- Jean Hersholt as Dr. Patterson
- Montagu Love as Hendricks
- Lawrence Grant as Crosby
- Theodore von Eltz as Harry Blythe
- Blanche Friderici as Mam' Pleasant
- Elizabeth Patterson as Susan

== Production ==
When Universal Studios planned to remake the silent film The Cat and the Canary, the studio attempted to re-hire its star Laura La Plante to repeat the leading role she had in that film. La Plante was unavailable for the role, and was later given to Helen Twelvetrees, leading to the title being changed to The Cat Creeps. A Spanish-language version titled La Voluntad del muerto (lit. 'The Will of the Dead') starring Lupita Tovar and directed by George Melford, was filmed on the same sets of The Cat Creeps at night.

== Release ==
The Cat Creeps opened in New York on November 7, 1930. La Voluntad del muerto was released in November 1930.

The film was considered a lost film until 2025, with its soundtrack and two minutes of footage known to exist as part of the 1932 Universal short film Boo!. Additional footage was rediscovered at Indiana University Bloomington in 2025. The film has now been reconstructed by the Vitaphone Soundtrack Project and is available on YouTube.

=== Remakes ===
The Cat Creeps was remade as The Cat and the Canary in 1939 with Bob Hope and Paulette Goddard with a more comedic approach. Elizabeth Patterson repeated her role in the film as Aunt Susan. The film was remade again in the late 1970s as The Cat and the Canary in the United Kingdom as a more horror oriented film.

In 1946, Universal released a second film titled The Cat Creeps which is unrelated to the original story and borrowed more from the 1940 film Horror Island.

== Reception ==
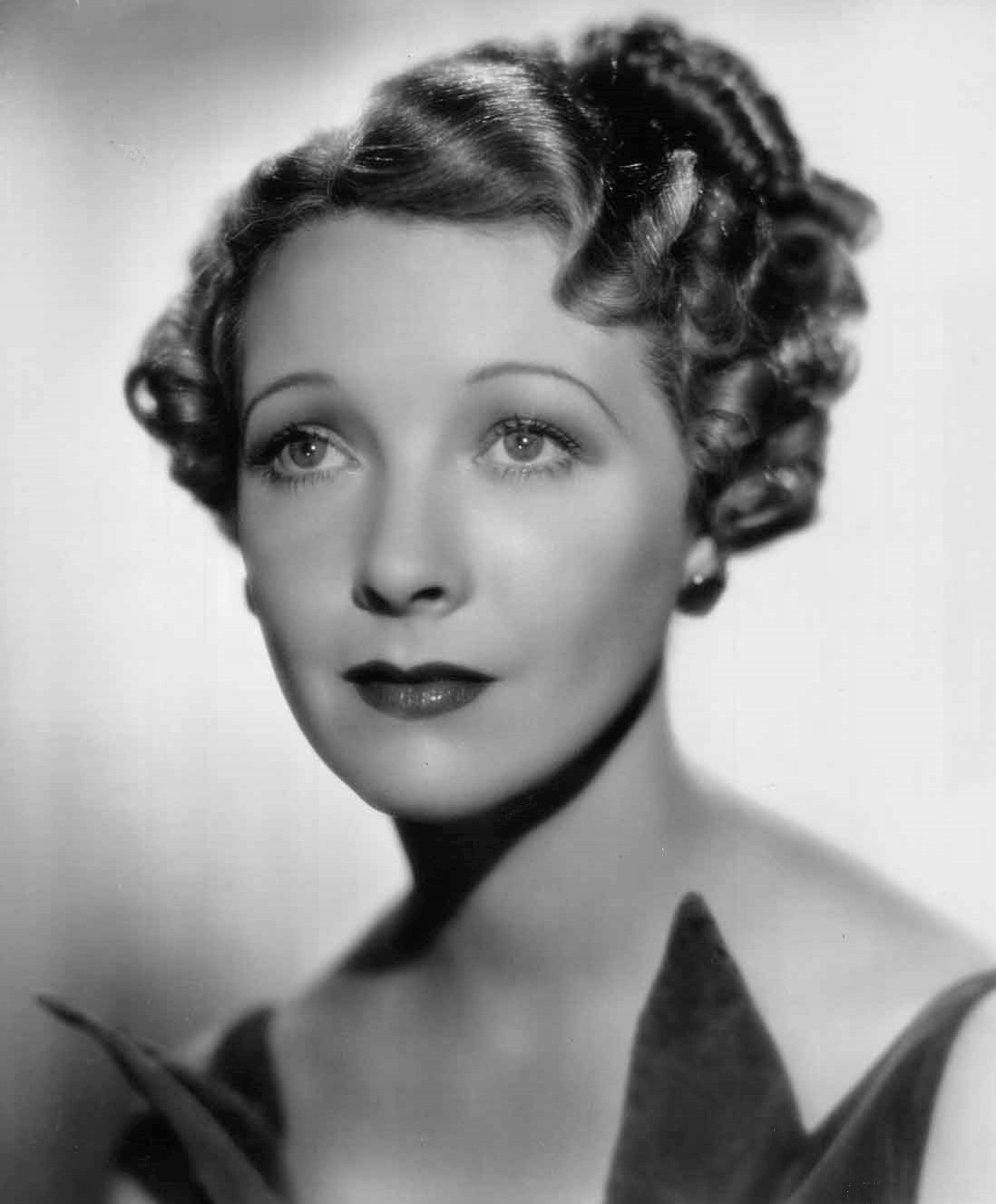
Helen Twelvetrees received praise for her role in the film by Exhibitor's Forum and The Bioscope.

From contemporary reviews, a review in Film Daily declared the film as "excellent" with "an all-around fine cast [...] Rupert Julian's direction is intelligent and effective." Exhibitor's Forum found that the film was a "mystery thriller expertly produced with an excellent cast" specifically noting Twelvetrees and Raymond Hackett. Picture Play Magazine also liked the film, calling it "well done."

Variety found the film's production values to be "first rate and the punch thrills neatly timed and built" while finding that "the creepy thrill value is still there, but in the translation from silent to sound it has been badly slowed up." A reviewer in The Bioscope found the film to be a "lurid enough melodrama" and that "it is rather clap-trap stuff, [...] but it nevertheless achieves its object." as well as praising the acting of Helen Twelvetrees, Raymond Hackett, Neil Hamilton and Blanche Friderici. Harrison's Reports declared the film to be "a weird mystery drama, filled with thrills and with considerable comedy. It is well acted and well presented and it keeps one in suspense to the very end." Silver Screen lamented that the original The Cat and the Canary film was "a much better mystery-thriller" and the "good cast is wasted" concluding the film to be "a very sad affair."

== See also ==
- List of lost films
- List of incomplete or partially lost films
