= Gjörup =

Gjörup is a surname. Notable people with the surname include:

- Fanny Gjörup (1961–2001), Swedish child actress
- Malin Gjörup (1964–2020), Swedish actress, mezzo-soprano, and arts administrator
