= Dow Hour of Great Mysteries =

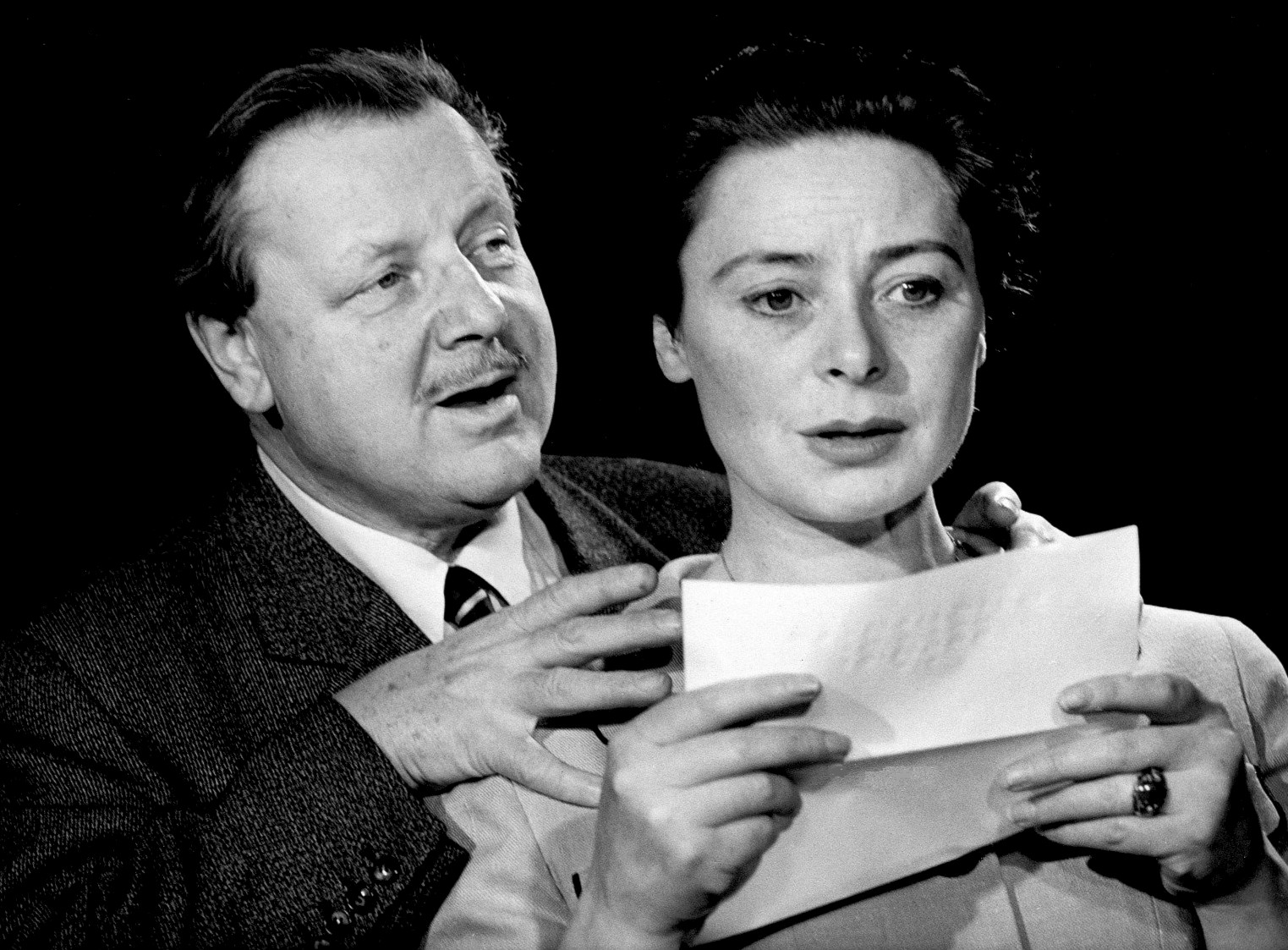
- Walter Slezak and Siobhán McKenna in "The Woman in White", 1960
- Directed by: Gower Champion; William A. Graham; David Greene; Paul Nickell
- Starring: Joseph Nye Welch (host)
- Country of origin: United States
- Original language: English
- No. of seasons: 1
- No. of episodes: 7

Production
- Executive producer: Robert Saudek
- Running time: 60 minutes

Original release
- Network: NBC Television
- Release: March 31 – November 15, 1960

The Dow Hour of Great Mysteries, was a series of seven television specials from March to November 1960, hosted by Joseph Nye Welch on NBC Television, and sponsored by Dow Chemical. Welch died on October 6, 1960, bringing the series to an end.

== Episodes ==
- Episode 1: The Bat by Mary Roberts Rinehart (31 March 1960) with Helen Hayes, Jason Robards, and Margaret Hamilton
- Episode 2: The Burning Court by John Dickson Carr (24 April 1960) with George C. Scott and Barbara Bel Geddes
- Episode 3: The Woman in White by Wilkie Collins (23 May 1960) with Walter Slezak, Siobhán McKenna and Lois Nettleton
- Episode 4: The Datchet Diamonds by Richard Marsh (20 September 1960) with Rex Harrison and Tammy Grimes
- Episode 5: The Cat and the Canary by John Willard (27 September 1960) with Andrew Duggan, Telly Savalas, and Collin Wilcox (actress)
- Episode 6: The Inn of the Flying Dragon by Sheridan Le Fanu (18 October 1960) with Farley Granger, Barry Morse, and Hugh Griffith
- Episode 7: The Great Impersonation by E. Philips Oppenheim (15 November 1960) with Keith Michell and Eva Gabor
