= Agneta Ekmanner =

Swedish actress (1938–2026)

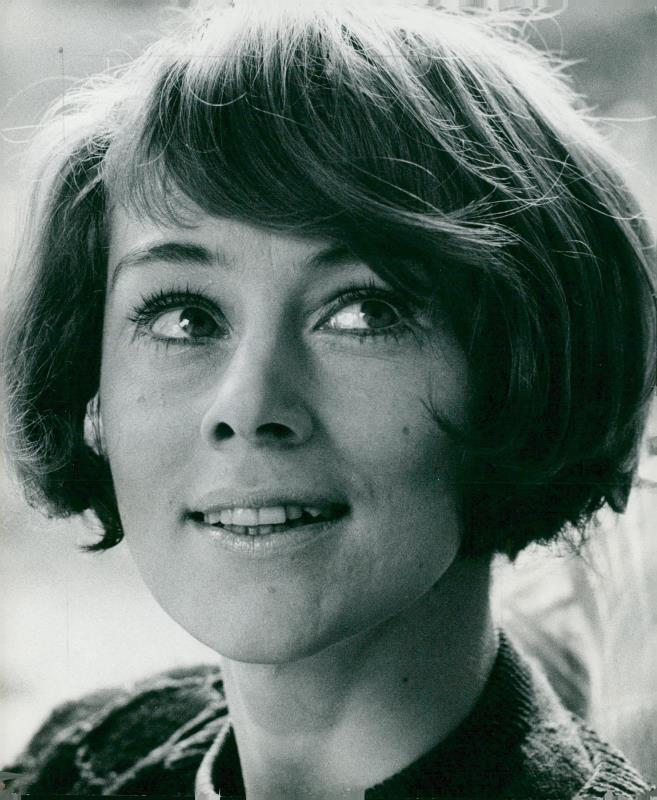
- Born: 4 December 1938; Stockholm, Sweden
- Died: 7 November 2026 (aged 87)
- Education: Lund University
- Occupation: Actress
- Years active: 1965–2026

Agneta Stendotter Ekmanner Cornell (4 December 1938 – 7 November 2026) was a Swedish actress. She appeared in more than 50 films and television shows beginning in 1965.

== Early life ==
Ekmanner was the daughter of dentist Sten Ekmanner (1910–1990) and Birgit Essén (1913–2008), and she was the granddaughter of diplomat Rutger Essén. She studied political science and history at Lund University, but never graduated. Alongside her studies, she was involved in Lund's Student Theater from 1963 to 1964. From 1965 to 1968, she studied at the Malmö Theatre Academy, where she was in the same class with future famous actors Claire Wikholm and Thomas Hellberg. She then joined the Stockholm City Theatre, where she remained until 2007. She was active at the Royal Dramatic Theatre from 1989 to 2006.

== Career ==
In 1967, she appeared nude in the film Hugs and Kisses, directed by her husband Jonas Cornell. Co-stars included Sven-Bertil Taube and Håkan Serner. In 1968, Ekmanner participated in the occupation of the Student Union Building in Stockholm. She also found an outlet for her political interest as a host for the debate programs Eftersnack (1970), That's Life (1977), and The Night Owl (1978).

In 2006, she was a summer talk show host on Sveriges Radio P1.

== Personal life ==
Agneta Ekmanner married director Jonas Cornell in 1965, and they had two children together. They remained married until Cornell died in 2022. Ekmanner died in November 2026, aged 87.

== Selected filmography ==
- Love 65 (1965)
- Hugs and Kisses (1967)
- The Corridor (1968)
- Duet for Cannibals (1969)
- Dear Irene (1971)
- Per (1975)
- Summer Paradise (1977)
- The Mozart Brothers (1986)
- Lethal Film (1988)
- Svart Lucia (1992)
- Murder at the Savoy (1993)
- Roseanna (1993)
- The Fire Engine That Disappeared (1993)
- The Police Murderer (1994)
- In the Presence of a Clown (1997)
- The Honour of the House (1999)
- White Water Fury (2000)
