= La Voluntad del muerto =

1930 film

La Voluntad del Muerto
- Theatrical release poster
- Directed by: Enrique Tovar Ávalos; George Melford
- Screenplay by: Baltasar Fernández Cué (script adaptation)
- Starring: Antoni Moreno; Lupita Tovar; Andrés de Segurola
- Cinematography: George Robinson
- Edited by: Arthur Tavares
- Distributed by: Universal Pictures
- Release date: December 12, 1930 (USA)

La Voluntad del Muerto (English: The Will of the Dead Man) is a Spanish-language version of The Cat Creeps (1930), both of which are now considered to be lost films. Both films were adaptations of the 1922 play The Cat and the Canary by John Willard.

The film was directed by George Melford and stars Antonio Moreno, Lupita Tovar, Andrés de Segurola, Roberto E. Guzmán, Paul Ellis, Lucio Villegas, Agostino Borgato, Conchita Ballesteros, María Calvo, and Soledad Jiménez.

A premiere gala was held for the film at Los Angeles' California Theatre on January 23, 1931.
