= The Cat and the Canary (1961 film) =

1961 Swedish television movie

- Swedish: Katten och kanariefågeln
- Written by: John Willard
- Directed by: Jan Molander
- Country of origin: Sweden
- Original language: Swedish

Original release
- Release: 24 March 1961

The Cat and the Canary (Swedish: Katten och kanariefågeln) is a 1961 Swedish television movie directed by Jan Molander. The film is an adaptation of John Willard's 1922 black comedy play of the same name. The play has been filmed many times, the first being a 1927 American silent film of the same name. The film stars Lena Granhagen as Annabelle West, Lars Lind as Paul Jones, and Birger Malmsten as Charles Wilder.

== Plot ==
Cyrus West's family is waiting eagerly for his death to get all his fortune. But Curtis, his lawyer, stipulates that his will should be read 20 years after his death. The family arrive to the mansion 20 years later expecting to receive part of the money, but the only heir is Annabelle West, as long as she proves to be mentally sane. If she is not, another person will receive the fortune, but the lawyer disappears before revealing the secret name.
