= Duet for Cannibals =

1969 film by Susan Sontag

- Promotional release poster
- Directed by: Susan Sontag
- Written by: Susan Sontag
- Starring: Adriana Asti; Gösta Ekman; Lars Ekborg; Agneta Ekmanner
- Production company: Sandrews
- Release date: May 1969 (Cannes)
- Running time: 105 minutes
- Country: Sweden
- Language: Swedish

Duet for Cannibals (Swedish: Duett för kannibaler) is a 1969 Swedish psychological drama film written and directed by American writer Susan Sontag, in her directorial debut. It stars Adriana Asti, Gösta Ekman, Lars Ekborg and Agneta Ekmanner.

Duet for Cannibals had its world premiere at the 1969 Cannes Film Festival.

== Cast ==
- Adriana Asti as Francesca
- Lars Ekborg as Bauer
- Gösta Ekman as Tomas
- Agneta Ekmanner as Ingrid

== Production ==
Despite being a Swedish-language film, the screenplay for Duet for Cannibals was written in English by Sontag, who described herself as not being "competent" in Swedish. It was then translated into Swedish for the Swedish actors.

== Reception ==
Kevin Kelly of The Boston Globe described the film as "virtually devoid of any real dramatic sensibility [...] The film is unbelievable either as black parable or self-consciously disciplined pap." Richard Roud of The Guardian praised its casting and the "richness of possible interpretations of the film", concluding: "Its originality of texture, its degree of visual invention, is remarkable, and not only for a first film. In short, Duet for Cannibals is a stunning achievement."

On the review aggregator website Rotten Tomatoes, the film has an approval rating of 80% based on five reviews, with an average rating of 6.8/10.

In 2019, Slant Magazine's Jesse Cataldo gave the film a score of three out of four stars, concluding: "An interesting, if tonally inconsistent, experiment, it serves as an intriguing cinematic extension of its maker's more well-known written work."
