= Boo! (1932 film) =

1932 film

- Directed by: Albert DeMond
- Written by: Albert DeMond
- Produced by: Albert DeMond
- Starring: Mae Clarke; Boris Karloff; Morton Lowry; Max Schreck
- Cinematography: Lynn Harrison
- Music by: Heinz Roemheld; James Dietrich
- Distributed by: Universal Pictures
- Release date: 1932
- Running time: 10 minutes
- Country: United States
- Language: English

Boo! is a 1932 American short film by Universal Pictures, directed and written by Albert DeMond. Boo! contains clips from the films Nosferatu (1922), The Cat Creeps (1930), and Frankenstein (1931), mocking them thoroughly.

Even though this short film was produced by Universal Studios, the makers decided not to use footage from the company's own version of Dracula, but instead to use footage from the German expressionist film Nosferatu directed by F. W. Murnau. Universal had obtained a print of Nosferatu in 1929 during their negotiations for the rights of Dracula for means of studying the film prior to developing their own adaptation, this print initially being one among several confiscated for destruction by the demand of Florence Stoker. The only surviving footage of The Cat Creeps—otherwise considered a lost film—are the clips included in Boo!. The short film's copyright was renewed in 1960. (Note: Under R258456)

== Plot ==
The film begins with a man (Morton Lowry) reading the novel Dracula. The narrator says that they are presenting their own formula for cheap entertainment, a nightmare. They say to eat a real lobster, not the kind they send to congress, have milk, and work up a chill. The man falls asleep.

They then go to a cellar (edited from Nosferatu) where the caretaker Hutter (Gustav von Wagenheim) is making sure all the ghosts are locked up for the night. He sees a coffin. He wants to ask his name and how he feels. It's Dracula (Count Orlok, played by Max Schreck). The caretaker tries to leave, but he keeps coming back. He can't sleep so he sleeps in a hammock (now edited of Albert Venohr). You see Dracula, so the caretaker goes upstairs and returns with a hatchet (now edited of Wolfgang Heinz) and breaks Dracula's coffin. It hurts Dracula, causing him to get up. He then leaves, and sees if it was as close as he thought. He is scared, and Dracula sucks his blood, 'Gush, Gush'. Dracula then goes to sleep for 100 years, until congress does something about the depression.

It then goes to a laboratory (edited from Frankenstein) where a Doctor (Edward Van Sloan) is doing something to The Monster (Boris Karloff). The Monster awakes, and kills the Doctor. The Monster gets together with Dracula, and is afraid of him.

It then goes to Annabelle West (Helen Twelvetrees) and a possibility of this becoming pleasant. But The Monster is there. A man is telling Helen she has no business being in the same nightmare as Dracula. Dracula is behind him, and brings him behind a bookshelf. The Monster is studying Dracula's methods. Helen sees a guy who keeps falling down. The Monster appears, and Helen faints.

Dracula's income tax was due and he had to get some money. When night came, Helen decided to call it a day. Dracula stole Helen's jewels. Helen is ticklish on the neck, woke up, screamed, and told a young man about what happened. He wants to see a ghost, but gets caught and his blood is sucked by Dracula. Helen can never get married, because when she talks to a guy Dracula gets him, so she'd be a widow every 15 minutes. Dracula then chases a woman. He's in disguise, but you can recognize him by the fourth toe on his left foot. The Monster decides to chase Elizabeth (Mae Clarke, who starred in Frankenstein) who is about to get married. She first is terrified. It then turns into "follow the leader", then into "ring around the rosy". Her fiancee would think she's nutty. She tells The Monster she can't play anymore because she's got to get married.

The Monster is heart-broken nobody's afraid of him. He has to sit down all day, because when he stands up, his feet touch the floor. He then sees something, and he gets up. What is it? Why it's our lobster and milk friend and he's on a chandelier. And the moral of the story is you can milk a cow, but a lobster is very ticklish.

== Production ==
The film features actor Morton Lowry in an uncredited role as the man frightened reading Dracula and later cowering in a chandelier.

The rest of the footage is taken from other films, such as Max Schreck and Gustav von Wangenheim from Nosferatu (1922), Boris Karloff, Mae Clarke, Edward Van Sloan from Frankenstein (1931), and Helen Twelvetrees, Lawrence Grant, Raymond Hackett from The Cat Creeps (1930).

== Reception ==
From contemporary reviews, Motion Pictures Daily declared that the film "produces little in the way of commendable entertainment" as it was "too disjointed and inexpertly done to achieve its purpose" Variety declared that the short will "amuse on its novelty value alone."

== Sources ==
- Rhodes, Gary D.; Hogan, David J. (2022). The Palgrave Encyclopedia of American Horror Film Shorts 1915-1976. Springer. ISBN 978-3-030-97563-0.
