= Fanny Gjörup =

Swedish actress (1961–2001)

Fanny Louise Gjörup (16 October 1961 in Örnäset, Luleå Municipality – 15 April 2001 in Rutvik, Luleå Municipality) was a Swedish child actress, well known for her appearance as Britta in the 1973 TV series Den vita stenen. Actress and operatic singer Malin Gjörup was her sister, and actor Håkan Serner was her stepfather. She and her mother died in a traffic accident.
