= Frank Heller =

Swedish writer

- Born: Martin Gunnar Serner; July 20, 1886
- Died: October 14, 1947 (aged 61); Malmö, Sweden
- Cause of death: Bicycle accident
- Education: PhD in English literature
- Alma mater: University of Lund
- Occupation: Writer
- Relatives: Håkan Serner(nephew)
- Writing career
- Pen name: Frank Heller
- Language: Swedish
- Genres: Crime fiction, science fiction, adventure, poetry
- Notable works: The Grand Duke's Finances, The Thousand and Second Night, Philip Collin series

Frank Heller was the pen name of the Swedish writer Gunnar Serner (20 July 1886 - 14 October 1947). He wrote novels and short adventure stories in the genres crime fiction and science fiction. His most well-known tales involve shady business transactions in an international milieu. His best known works concerned the recurring character Philip Collin, who was simultaneously a detective and a thief.

== Personal life ==
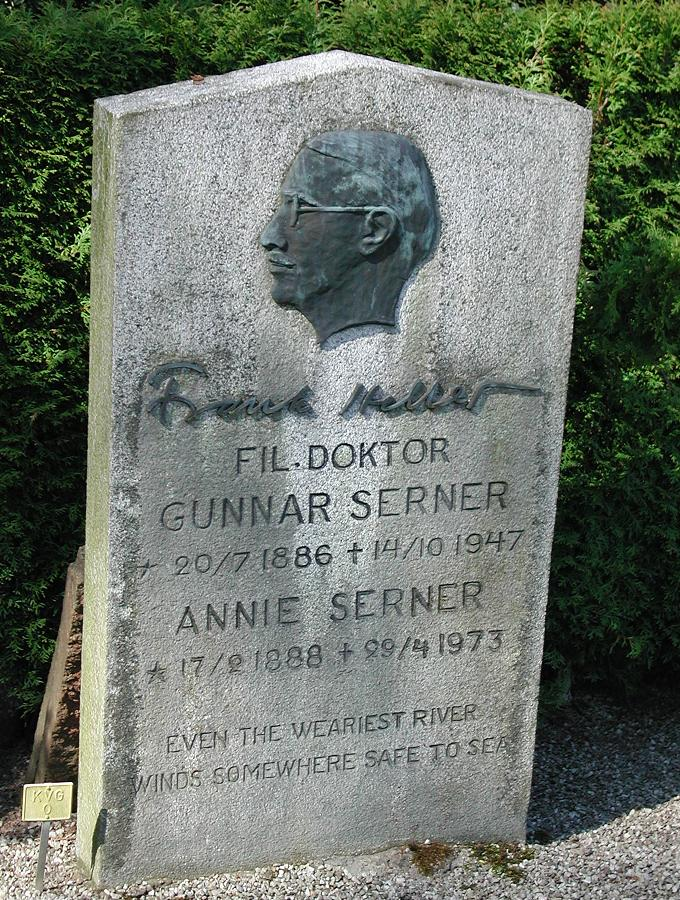
Frank Heller’s grave stone.

Heller received a PhD in English literature at the age of 23 from the University of Lund. He accumulated a lot of debt which he attempted to cover with forged checks. He was forced to flee Sweden in 1912 due to this role in bank fraud. Living abroad, he began writing novels to make a living, producing forty-three novels, short stories and travelogues before he died in 1947 in a bicycle accident. Heller was the uncle of the actor Håkan Serner.

== Works and their reception ==
In the early decades of the 20th century, Heller was "one of Sweden’s most widely read and translated authors," translated most often into German, Finnish, English and Russian. The Russian poet Osip Mandelshtam, for instance, translated his novel The Thousand and Second Night. His plots frequently involved high-stakes financial swindles, international diplomacy, and the glamorous underworld of Monte Carlo (which he knew from personal experience).

Heller was a literary sensation in the 1920s because his sophisticated, lighthearted thrillers perfectly captured the escapist spirit of the "Roaring Twenties". His inticately plotted stories had a witty, intellectual edge that other pulp thrillers mostly lacked. Heller's subsequent neglect was largely due to a massive shift in cultural tastes after the 1929 stock market crash, which made his "champagne-and-casino" style feel out of touch with the grim realities of the Great Depression and World War II.

== Frank Heller Prize ==
In 1981, the Swedish newspaper Kvällsposten founded the Frank Heller Prize awarded to an author who produced a significant work in the spirit of Frank Heller that reflects his excitement, humor and sense of language.

== The list of English translations ==
- The Spirits and Furustolpe (Swedish title: Andarna och Furustolpe), 1920
- The Emperor's Old Clothes, 1923 New York (also published as The Chinese Coats, London 1924) translated by Robert Emmons Lee
- The Marriage of Yussuf Khan, 1923, Crowell New York, Hutchinson & Co London 1924, translated by Robert Emmons Lee.
- The Grand Duke's Finances, translated by Robert Emmons Lee (1888-1925); the source of Murnau's film of the same name.
- The Perilous Transactions of Mr. Collin, 1924, likely the same as:
- The London Adventures of Mr. Collin, 1923, translated by Pauline Chary
  - Collection of the following short stories:
  - The story of the absent-minded gentleman
  - The sorrowful adventures of Mr. Isaacs
  - The mystery of the lost bullion
  - Mr. Collin becomes a landlord
  - Mr. Collin's holiday agency
  - The Blue-eyed lie
- Mr. Collin is Ruined, 1925
- The Strange Adventures of Mr. Collin, Crowell New York 1926
- The Thousand and Second Night, An Arabesque, translated by Robert Emmons Lee (Williams & Norgate, London, 1926)
- Lead Me into Temptation, translated by Robert Emmons Lee (Crowell, New York, 1927)
- Twilight of the Gladiators, 1944
