= Hugs and Kisses (film) =

1967 film

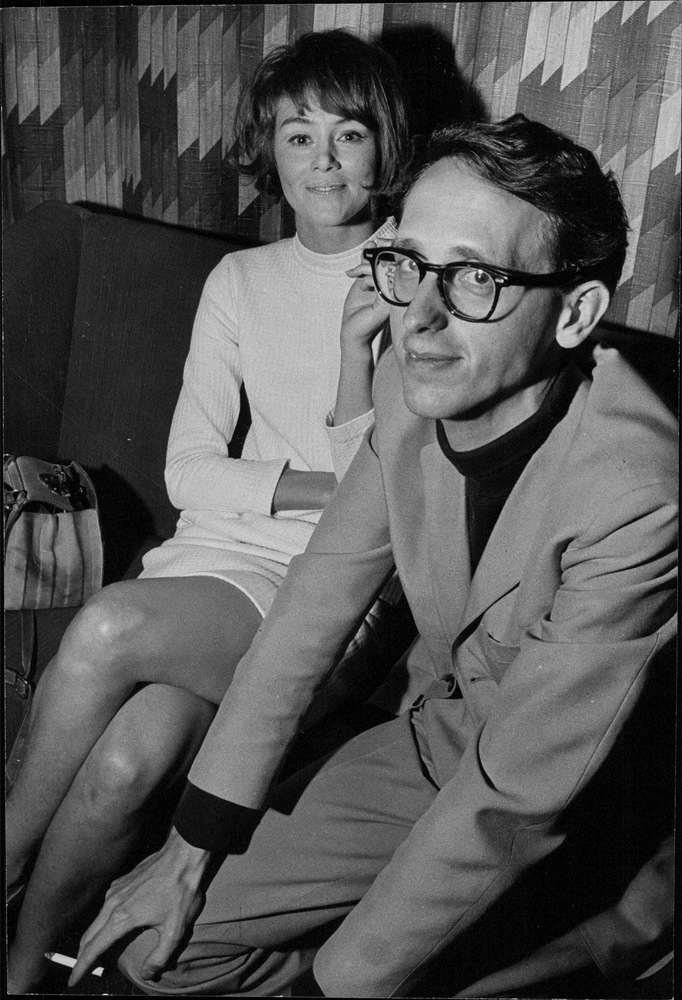
- Agneta Ekmanner with director Jonas Cornell
- Directed by: Jonas Cornell
- Written by: Jonas Cornell
- Produced by: Bo Jonsson; Göran Lindgren
- Starring: Agneta Ekmanner; Sven-Bertil Taube; Lena Granhagen; Håkan Serner; Ingrid Boström
- Cinematography: Lars Swanberg
- Edited by: Ingemar Ejve
- Music by: Bengt Ernryd
- Release date: 26 June 1967
- Running time: 94 min.
- Country: Sweden
- Language: Swedish

Hugs and Kisses (Swedish: Puss & kram) is a 1967 Swedish comedy drama film directed by Jonas Cornell. The film stars Agneta Ekmanner, Sven-Bertil Taube, Lena Granhagen, Håkan Serner, and Ingrid Boström in the lead roles. Musical direction was by Bengt Ernryd.

== Cast ==
- Agneta Ekmanner as Eva
- Sven-Bertil Taube as Max
- Lena Granhagen as Kickan
- Håkan Serner as John
- Ingrid Boström as Friend
- Rolf Larsson as Photographer
- Leif Zern as Shop assistant
- Rebecca Tarschys as Journalist
- Carl-Johan Rönn as Photographer
- Peter Cornell as Young man
- Tuulikki Lindroth as Photo model (credited as Tulikke Lindroth)
- Staffan Cullberg as Lecturer
