= Enrique Tovar Ávalos =

Mexican film director

Enrique Tovar Ávalos was a Mexican film director notable for remaking several Universal Horror films into Spanish language versions. These include La Voluntad del muerto (The Cat and the Canary, 1927) and Drácula (Dracula, 1931).
