= Lena Granhagen =

Swedish actress

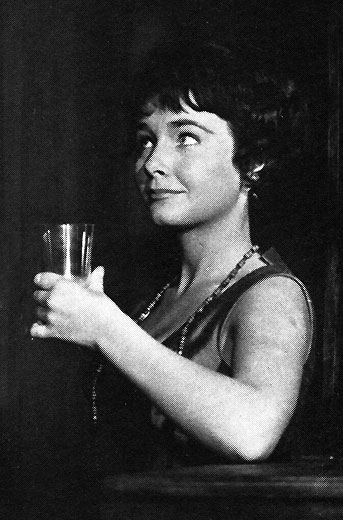
- Granhagen in 1959
- Born: Karin Anna-Lena Granhagen; 7 January 1938 (age 88); Luleå, Sweden
- Occupations: Actress, singer
- Years active: 1958–present
- Partner(s): Olof Thunberg (engaged 1959–?)

Karin Anna-Lena Granhagen (born 7 January 1938) is a Swedish actress and singer. She has appeared in 40 films and television shows since 1958. She starred in the 1969 film Made in Sweden, which won a Silver Bear award at the 19th Berlin International Film Festival.

== Selected filmography ==
- Musik ombord (1958)
- The Lady in Black (1958)
- Mannequin in Red (1958)
- Rider in Blue (1959)
- Heaven and Pancake (1959)
- Summer and Sinners (1960)
- On a Bench in a Park (1960)
- The Cat and the Canary (1961)
- The Lady in White (1962)
- The Cats (1965)
- Stimulantia (1967)
- Hugs and Kisses (1967)
- Made in Sweden (1969)
- Children's Island (1980)
- Love Me! (1986)
- Glasblåsarns barn (1998)
