= Beth Franklyn =

American actress

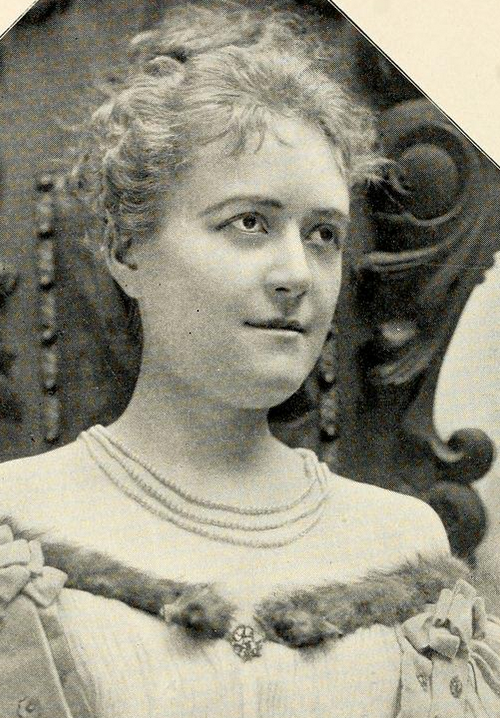
- Beth Franklyn, from an 1897 publication.
- Born: 1873 or 1875; San Francisco, California
- Died: March 5, 1956; Baltimore, Maryland
- Occupation: Actress
- Years active: 1890s-1930s

Beth Franklyn (1870s – March 5, 1956) was an American actress.

== Early life ==
Franklyn was born in San Francisco in 1873 or 1875 (sources vary), the daughter of William Payne Barnes and Margaret Barnes.

== Career ==
By 1901, Franklyn had joined the Albaugh Palace Theatre Company in Baltimore, and was John Albaugh's leading lady for several years. She was a member of Amelia Bingham's company in 1908.

Franklyn's Broadway credits included roles in Shameen Dhu (1914), The Revolt (1915), Some Baby! (1915), The Blue Envelope (1916), The Love Drive (1917), Pot Luck (1921), The New Poor (1924), and A Slight Case of Murder (1935). Other stage appearances included roles in Chimmie Fadden (1896), Sowing the Wind (1901), Her Trial Marriage (1907), Alias Jimmy Valentine (1912), The Blue Mouse (1912), Nobody's Widow (1915), The Girl of the Golden West (1915), Oh Look! (1919) with the Dolly Sisters and Harry Fox, Clarence (1921), The Cat and the Canary (1922) with Florence Eldridge and Henry Hull, and Butter and Egg Man (1927). She was known for playing Irish characters.

Franklyn appeared in a silent film, Nothing but the Truth (1920). She also directed school theatrical productions in Baltimore. She favored the tango ("Let everybody dance the tango, if he or she sees fit to do it properly, and living with be better"), and women's suffrage, "but I do not believe in militancy. I think it is just horrid for women to fight," she commented in 1914.

== Personal life ==
Franklyn was reported to have secretly married to Richard Wallach in 1897. She lived with Jane T. Pillsbury, "her companion and friend of 50 years". She died in 1956 in Baltimore, in her eighties.
