= Malin Gjörup =

Swedish actress (1964–2020)

- Born: Eva Malin Maria Gjoerup; April 28, 1964; Luleå, Sweden
- Died: May 20, 2020 (age 56); Sweden
- Other names: Malin Gjörup-Zetterström
- Occupations: Actress, singer, arts administrator
- Relatives: Fanny Gjörup (sister); Håkan Serner (stepfather)

Eva Malin Maria Gjörup (28 April 1964 – 20 May 2020) was a Swedish actress, mezzo-soprano, and arts administrator. She was sister to the actress, Fanny Gjörup (1961–2001), and stepdaughter to actor Håkan Serner.

== Early life and education ==
Gjörup was born in Luleå, the daughter of Annette Bogeland and Henning Gjörup. Her mother married actor Håkan Serner in 1970. She studied at Malmö Academy of Music, where she earned a diploma in 1992.

== Career ==
Gjörup performed at the Gothenburg City Theatre, National Swedish Touring Theatre, and Folkoperan. She had small roles in several films, including Ingmar Bergman's Cries and Whispers (1972). She worked at Svenska konsertbyrån, and as a producer at Gävle Symphony Orchestra. Later, she worked at the Norrlandsoperan in Umeå, Sweden, where she became opera manager and program manager for its symphony orchestra.

Gjörup made several recordings.

== Personal life ==
Gjörup married fellow performer Fredrik Zetterström in 1999. She died in May 2020, aged 56, from a sudden cerebral haemorrhage.

== Filmography ==
Year	Title	Role	Notes
1972	Cries and Whispers	Anna's Daughter	Uncredited
1976	Hello Baby	The Girl as Child	
