= The Cat and the Canary (1939 film) =

1939 film by Elliott Nugent

- Directed by: Elliott Nugent
- Written by: Walter DeLeon; Lynn Starling
- Based on: The Cat and the Canary by John Willard
- Produced by: Arthur Hornblow Jr.
- Starring: Bob Hope; Paulette Goddard; John Beal; Douglass Montgomery; Gale Sondergaard; Elizabeth Patterson; George Zucco
- Cinematography: Charles B. Lang
- Edited by: Archie Marshek
- Music by: Ernst Toch
- Production company: Paramount Pictures
- Distributed by: Paramount Pictures
- Release date: October 25, 1939 (Lewistown, Montana)
- Running time: 72 minutes
- Country: United States
- Language: English

The Cat and the Canary is a 1939 American horror comedy film directed by Elliott Nugent and starring Bob Hope, Paulette Goddard, John Beal, and Douglass Montgomery. It the second film adaptation of John Willard's 1922 play of the same name, after Paul Leni's 1927 silent film adaptation. Set in the Louisiana bayou, the film follows a group of potential heirs who gather at deceased man's isolated mansion—purported to be haunted—for the reading of his will.

Distributed by Paramount Pictures, The Cat and the Canary was released in select cities in late October 1939. The film's copyright was renewed in 1966.

== Plot ==
The Cat and the Canary trailer

Cyrus Norman was a millionaire who lived in the Louisiana bayous with his mistress Miss Lu. Norman died ten years previous, and now an American Indian man paddles the executor of Norman's estate, Mr. Crosby, through alligator-infested waters to Norman's isolated mansion, where his will is to be read at midnight. At the mansion, Crosby meets Miss Lu, who lives there with a large black cat. When he removes the will from a safe, he discovers that someone has tampered with it.

Crosby and Miss Lu are joined by Norman's surviving relatives: Joyce Norman, Fred Blythe, Charles Wilder, Cicily Young, Aunt Susan Tilbury, and Wally Campbell. As the group gathers in the parlor to read the will, an unseen gong rings seven times. According to Miss Lu, this means that only seven of the eight people present will survive the night.

Norman's will has two parts. The first indicates that Joyce will inherit the entire estate, under one condition: concerned about a streak of insanity in the family's blood, Norman stipulated that his heirs must remain sane for the next 30 days. If Joyce loses her sanity during that time, the heir will be determined from the second part of the will. This arrangement raises concerns about Joyce's safety, since other family members can increase their chances of inheriting by murdering her or driving her insane.

After the reading, Crosby informs everyone that they will have to stay overnight; Miss Lu warns them of spirits in the house; and a security guard found prowling outside claims that a murderer called "The Cat" has escaped from the nearby insane asylum. In the parlor, Crosby tries to warn Joyce about something, but a hidden doorway opens in the wall and someone pulls him into the space behind it. Joyce becomes frightened when everyone except Wally believes she imagined this.

Amid suspicion and accusations, Miss Lu gives Joyce a letter from Norman that Joyce and Wally use to find a diamond necklace. Joyce puts the necklace under her pillow in Norman's room, but after she falls asleep, a hand reaches out from the wall, terrifies her, and takes the necklace. At this point, Joyce is almost out of her mind with fear and confusion, but Wally finds a movable wall panel near her bed and opens a hidden door leading to a secret passageway. Crosby's dead body falls out from behind the door.

To help Joyce recover from her fright, Wally chats to her in the parlor. When he leaves to fetch some liquor, he hears something in Norman's room, opens the hidden door, and explores the passageway. Meanwhile, Joyce sees the door in the parlor as it opens. When Wally calls to her, she hears him through the passageway and enters it to find him. Once she is inside, someone closes the door.

With no exit, Joyce explores the passageway, walking past a dark cranny where the security guard is hiding. The Cat also walks past the guard, who stops him and takes the necklace from him, but the Cat stabs the guard in the back and follows Joyce, who has discovered a door leading outside. After the Cat chases Joyce into a shed and threatens her with a knife, Wally arrives and calls him "Charlie", having found the second part of the will in Charles's coat. Charles removes his Cat mask, pins Wally to the wall with his knife, and begins to strangle Joyce, but Miss Lu arrives with a shotgun and kills him. The next day, Wally and Joyce explain the story to newspaper reporters and unofficially announce their engagement.

== Cast ==
- Bob Hope as Wally Campbell
- Paulette Goddard as Joyce Norman
- John Beal as Fred Blythe
- Douglass Montgomery as Charles Wilder
- Gale Sondergaard as Miss Lu
- Elizabeth Patterson as Aunt Susan
- Nydia Westman as Cicily
- George Zucco as Lawyer Crosby
- John Wray as Hendricks
- George Regas as Indian guide

== Production ==
Principal photography began in the spring of 1939. Filming was rushed into production so that actress Paulette Goddard would be available to shoot The Great Dictator (1940) with Charlie Chaplin in May of that year.

== Release ==
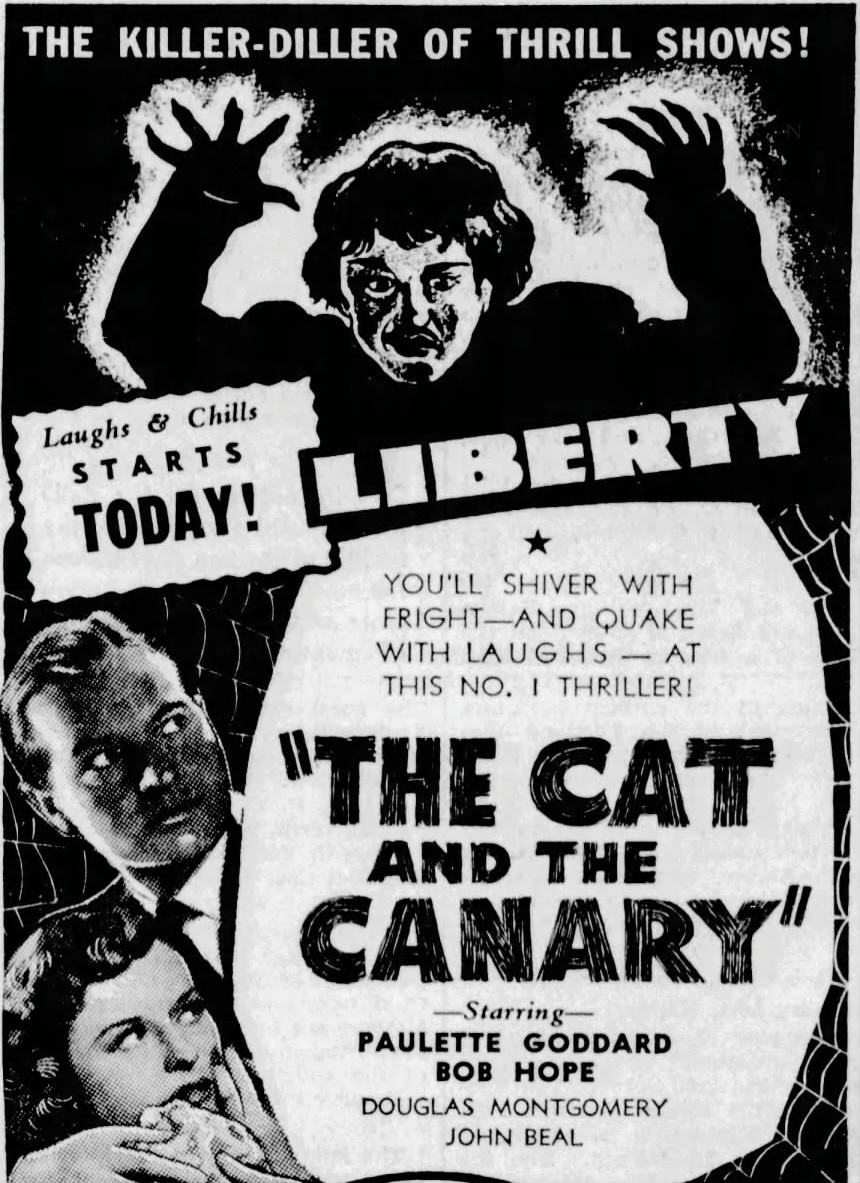
Newspaper advertisement in The Oregon Daily Journal, November 1939

The Cat and the Canary was released in Lewistown, Montana on October 25, 1939. The film premiered on Halloween night 1939 in select cities, including Shreveport, Louisiana and Muscatine, Iowa. The film's release expanded on November 10, 1939.

The film premiered in Sydney, Australia on December 22, 1939.

=== Home media ===
Universal Home Entertainment released the film on DVD in 2010 as part of the Bob Hope: Thanks for the Memories Collection and again in 2011 individually as a part of their "Universal Vault Series". Kino Lorber released the film on Blu-ray on September 15, 2020.

== Reception ==
The New York Times wrote that Elliott Nugent "has directed it smartly, taking full advantage of the standard chiller devices for frightening the susceptible of his audience but never losing sight of his main objective—comedy...the objective is carried briskly and to our complete satisfaction. Good show." Variety wrote that the movie retained "the basic spooky atmosphere and chiller situations" of the original play and "will amply satisfy the mystery fans, and provide spine-chilling thrills for audiences generally."

Harold Hunt of The Oregon Daily Journal praised Hope's comedic performance and noted that the film kept "audiences torn between shrieks and roars of laughter." Edwin Schallert of the Los Angeles Times similarly observed that Hope's performance provided a "lift" to the material, adding that the film had "all the zip of a brand-new whodunit feature."

Writing in a 2014 retrospective for Turner Classic Movies, Michael Atkinson commented: "It's a confection, this movie, all of 72 minutes long and as effortless buoyant as a carnival balloon. Photographed by the estimable silversmith Charles Lang, the movie doesn't really have a single DNA strand of creepiness or menace to it; the scenario's Gothic tension has been completely sublimated by studio gloss and comic irreverence. And so it was for 1939 audiences, for whom the dread delivered by horror films earlier in the decade had been overshadowed by real international concerns elsewhere, and economic devastation at home."
