= Håkan Serner =

Swedish actor

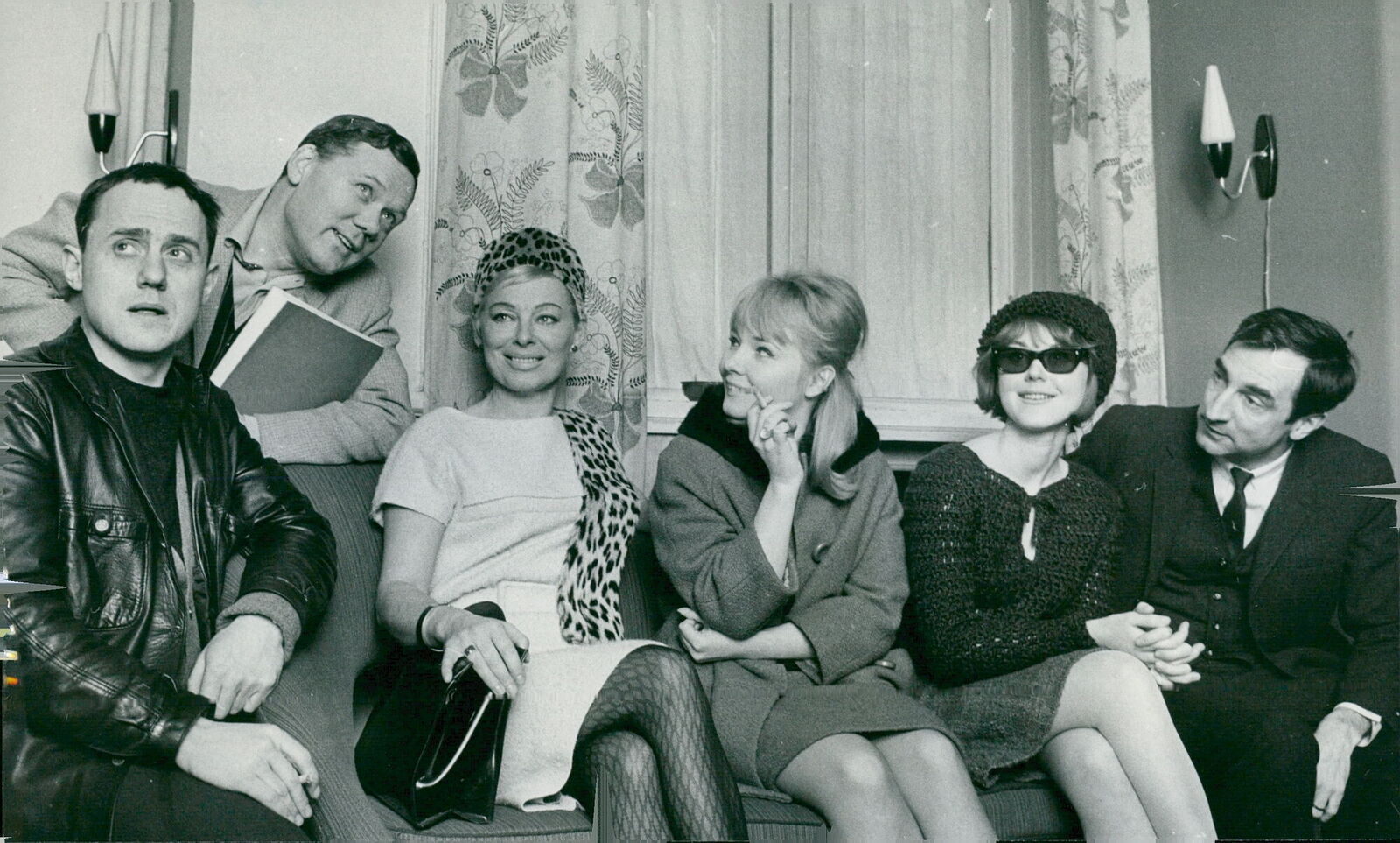
- Serner at left, in 1965
- Born: John Gunnar Håkan Serner; 1 September 1933; Malmö, Sweden
- Died: 25 October 1984 (aged 51); Stockholm, Sweden
- Years active: 1953–1984
- Spouse(s): Gunilla Rönnow (m. 1956–1961) Anneli Helenius (m. 1962–1965) Annette Gjörup (m. 1969–1984)
- Relatives: Frank Heller (uncle)

John Gunnar Håkan Serner (1 September 1933 in Malmö – 25 October 1984 in Stockholm) was a Swedish actor.

== Family ==
He was nephew to Frank Heller, and stepfather to Malin Gjörup.

== Awards ==
In 1977, Serner received the award for Best Actor at the 13th Guldbagge Awards for his roles in the films The Man on the Roof (1976) and Bang! (1977).

== Death ==
Serner committed suicide by hanging himself on 25 October 1984, aged 51.

== Partial filmography ==
- 1953: Marianne - Marianne's Class Mate
- 1953: Speed Fever - Gunnar Norén
- 1955: Violence - Officer (uncredited)
- 1958: The Goat in the Garden - Smörgåsnissen på Horn (1958) (uncredited)
- 1958: The Great Amateur - Actor (uncredited)
- 1958: Playing on the Rainbow - The chairman of the film studio (uncredited)
- 1958: The Jazz Boy - Telegrambudet
- 1959: Raggare! - Sven-Erik
- 1959: Fridolfs farliga ålder
- 1964: Dear John - Erwin
- 1965: Calle P. - Criminal
- 1966: Hemsöborna (TV Mini-Series) - Norman
- 1967: Hugs and Kisses - John
- 1968: Bombi Bitt och jag (TV Series) - Lantmannen
- 1968: Het snö - Klas Bergström
- 1969: Som natt och dag - Gustav
- 1969: Mej och dej - Policeman
- 1969: Ni ljuger - An inmate (uncredited)
- 1969: Kameleonterna - Bertil Broström
- 1970: Pippin on the South Seas - Franko
- 1970: Ministern - Schering
- 1971: Niklas och Figuren - Niklas' Father
- 1971: The Apple War - Eberhard Lindberg
- 1971: Smoke - Foreman
- 1973: Den vita stenen (TV Mini-Series) - Skomakaren Sivert Kolmodin
- 1974: Dunderklumpen! - Lionel (voice)
- 1975: Ungkarlshotellet - Blomman
- 1976: Hello Baby - The Girl's Ex-man
- 1976: The Man on the Roof - Einar Rönn
- 1977: Bang! - Hinder
- 1979: Trolltider (TV Series, Julkalendern) - Vätten
- 1980: Flygnivå 450 - Andre
- 1981: Snacka går ju... - Acke
- 1981: Rasmus på luffen - Liander
- 1984: Sömnen - The Father
- 1984: The Man from Majorca - Inspector Andersson

Awards and achievements
| Preceded by Toivo Pawlo | Guldbagge Awards for Best Actor in a Leading Role; 1976/77 | Succeeded by Anders Lönnbro |
