= The Cat and the Canary (play) =

1922 stage play by John Willard

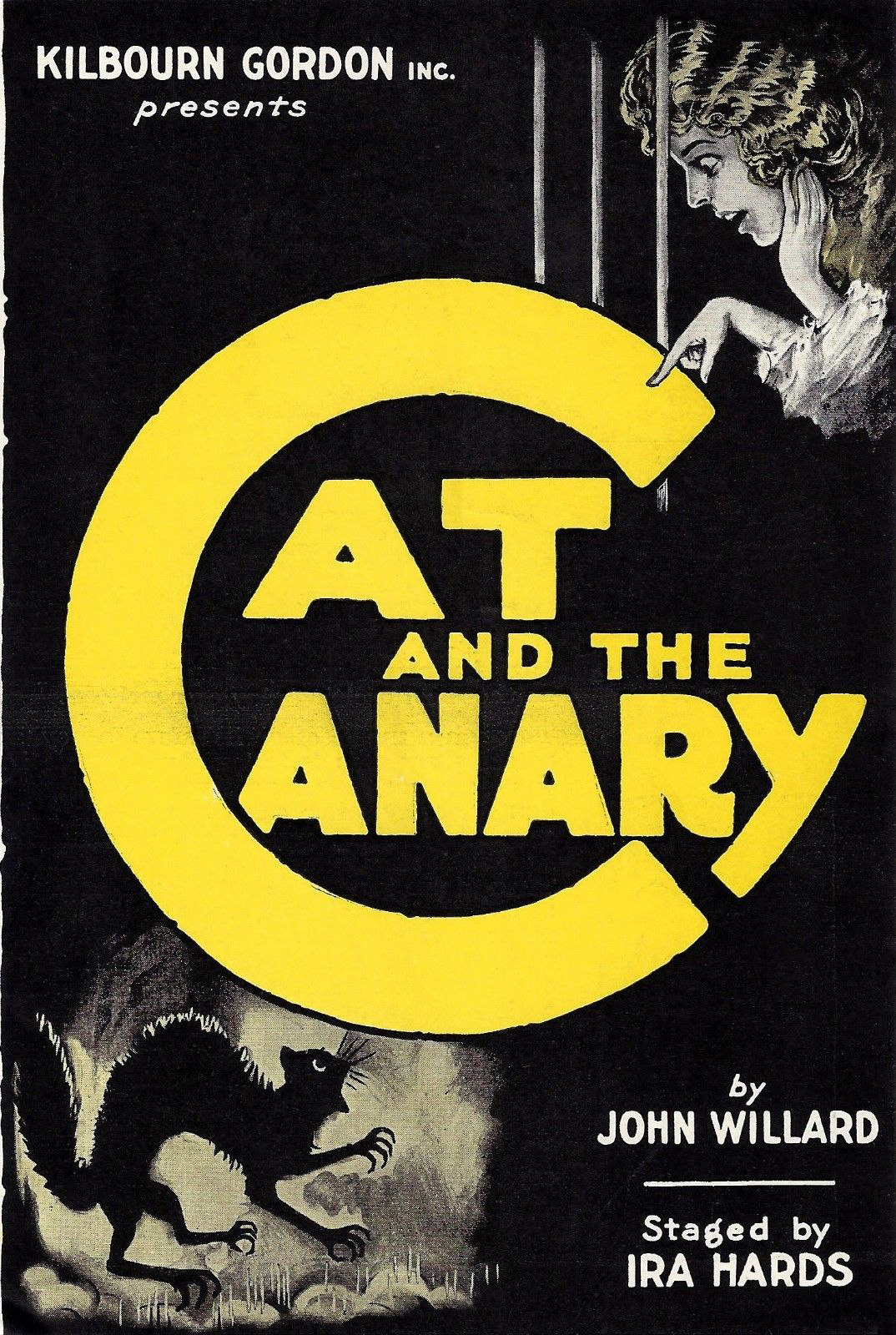
- Advertising herald for the 1922 Broadway production
- Original language: English
- Written by: John Willard
- Genre: Melodrama
- Setting: Glencliff Manor on the Hudson

Premiere
- Date: February 7, 1922
- Place: National Theatre, New York City

The Cat and the Canary is a 1922 stage play by John Willard, adapted at least four times into feature films, in 1927, 1930, 1939, and again in 1979. The original stage play opened on Broadway February 7, 1922.

== Plot ==
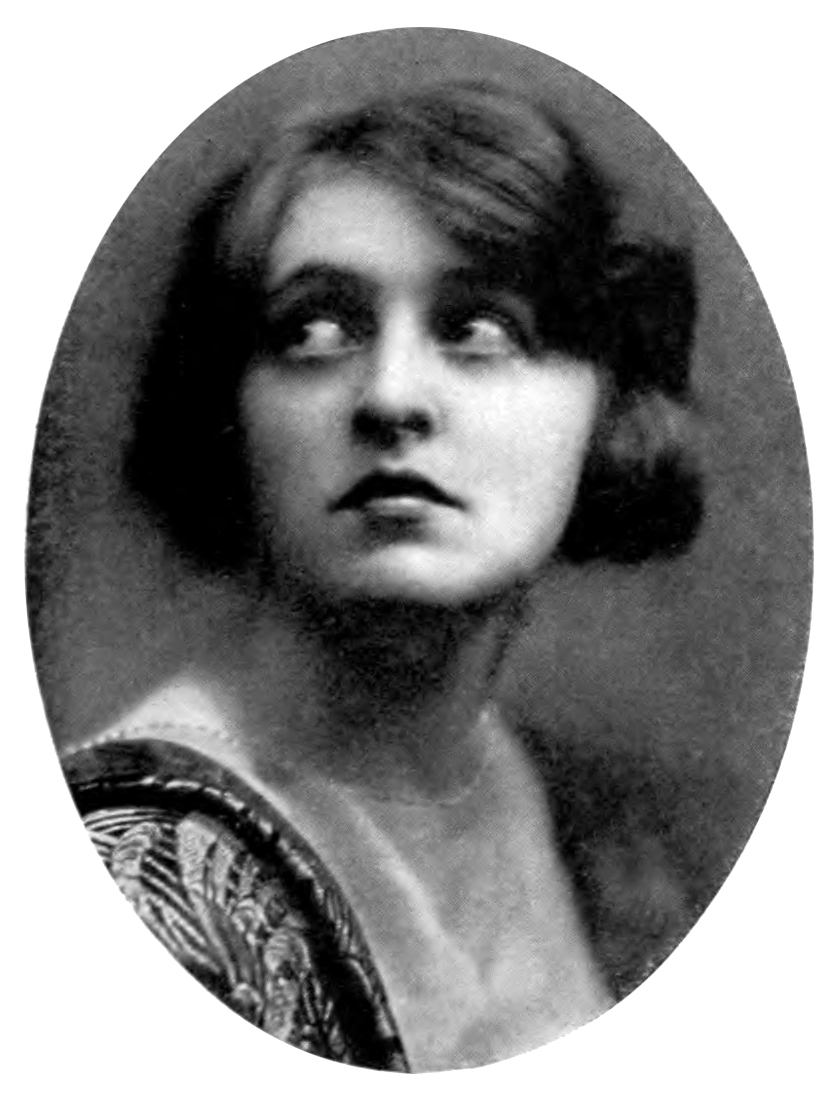
Florence Eldridge as Anabelle West, imperiled heroine of The Cat and the Canary (1922)

The story concerns the death and inheritance of old Cyrus West, a rich eccentric. He decrees that his will be read 20 years after his death, at which point his relatives converge at his old family home, now a spooky old haunted mansion.

The will reads that his most distant relative still bearing the name of West be sole heir, provided they are legally sane. The rest of the night spent in the house calls into question the sanity of Annabelle West, a fragile young woman who is legally Cyrus West's heir.

== Production ==
Produced by Kilbourn Gordon and directed by Ira Hards, The Cat and the Canary premiered February 7, 1922, at the National Theatre. It ran 148 performances, closing December 2, 1922. The three-act mystery made a return engagement of 40 performances (April 23 – May 26, 1923).

=== Cast ===
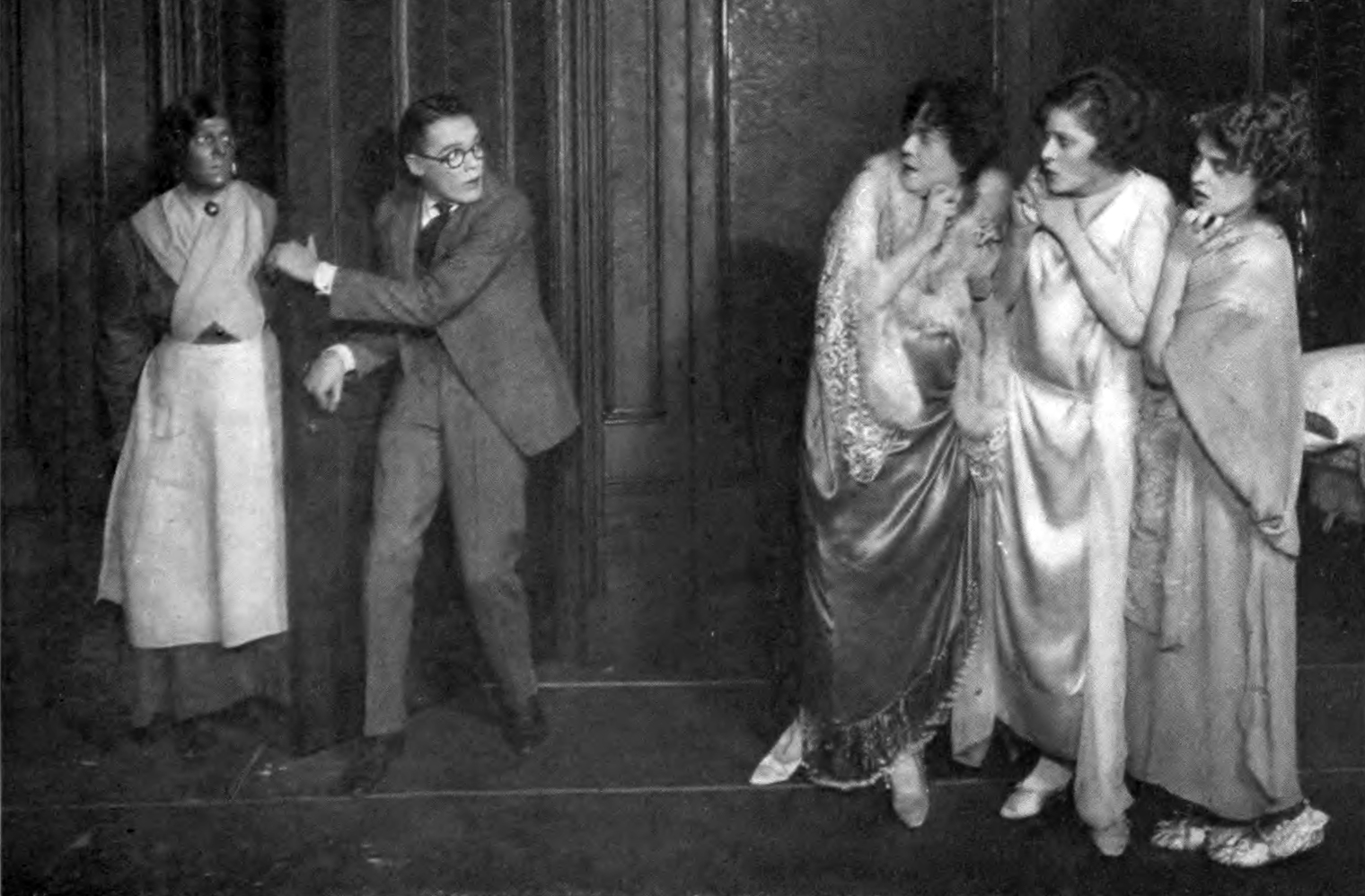
The Cat and the Canary cast from left: Blanche Friderici, Henry Hull, Beth Franklyn, Jane Warrington and Florence Eldridge

- Percy Moore as Roger Crosby
- Blanche Friderici as "Mammy" Pleasant
- John Willard as Harry Blythe
- Beth Franklyn as Susan Sillsby
- Jane Warrington as Cicely Young
- Ryder Keane as Charles Wilder
- Henry Hull as Paul Jones
- Florence Eldridge as Annabelle West
- Edmund Elton as Hendricks
- Harry D. Southard as Patterson

== Publication ==
The Cat and the Canary was published by Samuel French in 1921.

== Adaptations ==
- 1927: The 1927 silent version, directed by Paul Leni, and stars Laura La Plante as Annabelle West, and Creighton Hale as Paul Jones.
- 1930: The 1930 version, made under the title The Cat Creeps is now considered a lost film. The Cat Creeps was Universal's first horror film with sound and dialogue, predating its classic Universal horror films like Frankenstein (1931), Dracula (1931), and The Invisible Man (1933).
- 1939: The 1939 version, directed by Elliott Nugent, stars Bob Hope, Paulette Goddard, and Gale Sondergaard. This version is mainly comedic. Universal, who owned the rights to the play, sold them to Paramount Pictures for this production. The film, along with the 1940 film The Ghost Breakers, was an inspiration to Walt Disney for his Haunted Mansion attraction at Disneyland.
- 1960: On 27 September 1960, a one-hour version of the play was presented on Dow Hour of Great Mysteries on NBC Television.
- 1978: The 1978 British version, written and directed by Radley Metzger, stars Honor Blackman, Michael Callan, Edward Fox, Wendy Hiller, Olivia Hussey, Wilfred Hyde-White, Beatrix Lehmann, Carol Lynley, Daniel Massey, and Peter McEnery.
- 2020: A stage production starring Britt Ekland, Mark Jordon, Tracy Shaw, Marti Webb, Gary Webster, Ben Nealon, Nikki Patel and Eric Carte.
