= John Willard (playwright) =

American dramatist

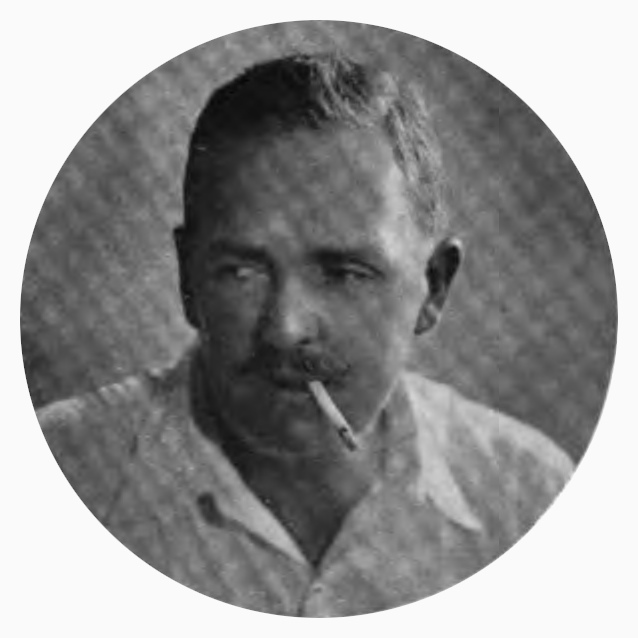
- Born: November 28, 1885; San Francisco, California, US
- Died: August 30, 1942 (aged 56); Los Angeles, California, US
- Occupation: Playwright

John Willard (November 28, 1885 – August 30, 1942) was an American playwright, screenwriter, and actor.

== Biography ==
Willard's most famous work is The Cat and the Canary (1922), which was made into the influential silent film of the same name in 1927. Also, the work was filmed in 1930, in 1939 (starring Bob Hope and Paulette Goddard) and in 1979 (by Radley Metzger). Willard also co-wrote The Blue Flame (1920) with George V. Hobart.

Willard worked as a miner and a reporter, and he was also a published novelist. He also appeared as one of the actors in the Broadway production of The Cat and the Canary. His other acting on Broadway began with George Washington, Jr. (1906) and ended with The Mikado (1936).

He was born in San Francisco, California, a son of portrait painter John Willard Clawson and Mary Alice Clawson. Born Willard Wesley Clawson, and known locally as Wesley Clawson, he began his career as a baritone singer and actor. His performance in Pagliacci secured him a contract to sing baritone solos with Oscar Hammerstein in New York.

He was married to Gladys Caldwell and later to actress Roberta Arnold. During World War I he was a captain in the United States Army Air Corps, and flew bombing runs over German machine-gun sites. He died in 1942 of a heart attack at Hollywood Hospital.
