= Richie Ling =

English singer and actor, 1867-1937

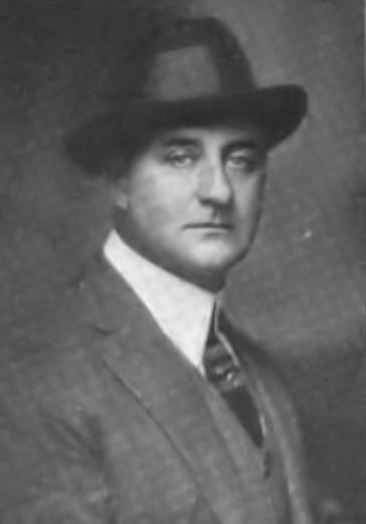
- Richie Ling 1915
- Born: Richard Wilson Ling; October 18, 1867; Hammersmith, London, U.K.
- Died: March 5, 1937 (aged 69); Manhattan, New York, U.S.
- Occupations: Singer, Actor
- Years active: 1888 - 1937
- Known for: Chu Chin Chow, The Road to Rome
- Spouses: Charlotte Faust (m. 1902; died 1910); Rose Beatrice Winter (m. 1912, divorced)

Richie Ling (October 18, 1867 – March 5, 1937) was an English singer and actor, whose career was mainly in the United States. He was originally an operatic tenor, became a stage actor, and later made some silent films. He was the original Gold Star member of Actors' Equity Association, having been the first performer to heed the callout for the 1919 Actors' Strike. Among many Broadway productions, his portrayal of Fabius Maximus for Robert E. Sherwood's historical satire The Road to Rome was his longest running role at 396 performances. He was on the stage for more than fifty years, and had just finished a Broadway show two weeks before his death.

== Early years ==
Richard Wilson Ling was born on October 18, 1867, in Hammersmith, London, to Richard Thomas Ling and his wife Jane Bellamy. He was baptised at St Alphege London Wall on December 22, 1867. By 1891 he was living with his widowed mother, and sisters Agnes and Jennie, in Peckham, London.

== UK career ==
=== Opera ===
His first known public performance was in September 1888, when he sang in the comic opera The Bey of Tunis by M. Audibert at Portland Hall in Southsea. Credited as "Richie Ling", he sang the lead role of Luigi, Prince of Sicily. The local reviewer said he "sang well", his final number "being received with rounds of applause and repeated." Two months later, he performed with the Carl Rosa Opera Company in a light opera, Paul Jones, (Note: A fictional treatment of John Paul Jones before the American Revolutionary War.) by Robert Planquette and H. B. Farnie, performed at the Theatre Royal in Bolton. Ling would continue with the Carl Rosa Opera Company, playing the role of Rufino in Paul Jones, at venues throughout England and Scotland during 1889, up through June 1890.

=== Stage ===
Ling is next heard of with the Anomalies Amateur Dramatic Club's production of Jim the Penman, in West Norwood, during May 1891. That same month he performed in an original one-act musical comedy called Sweepstakes. Both were short-lived productions; by June, Ling was reduced to a chorus part in a musical play.

== US operatic career ==
=== Vagabond tenor ===
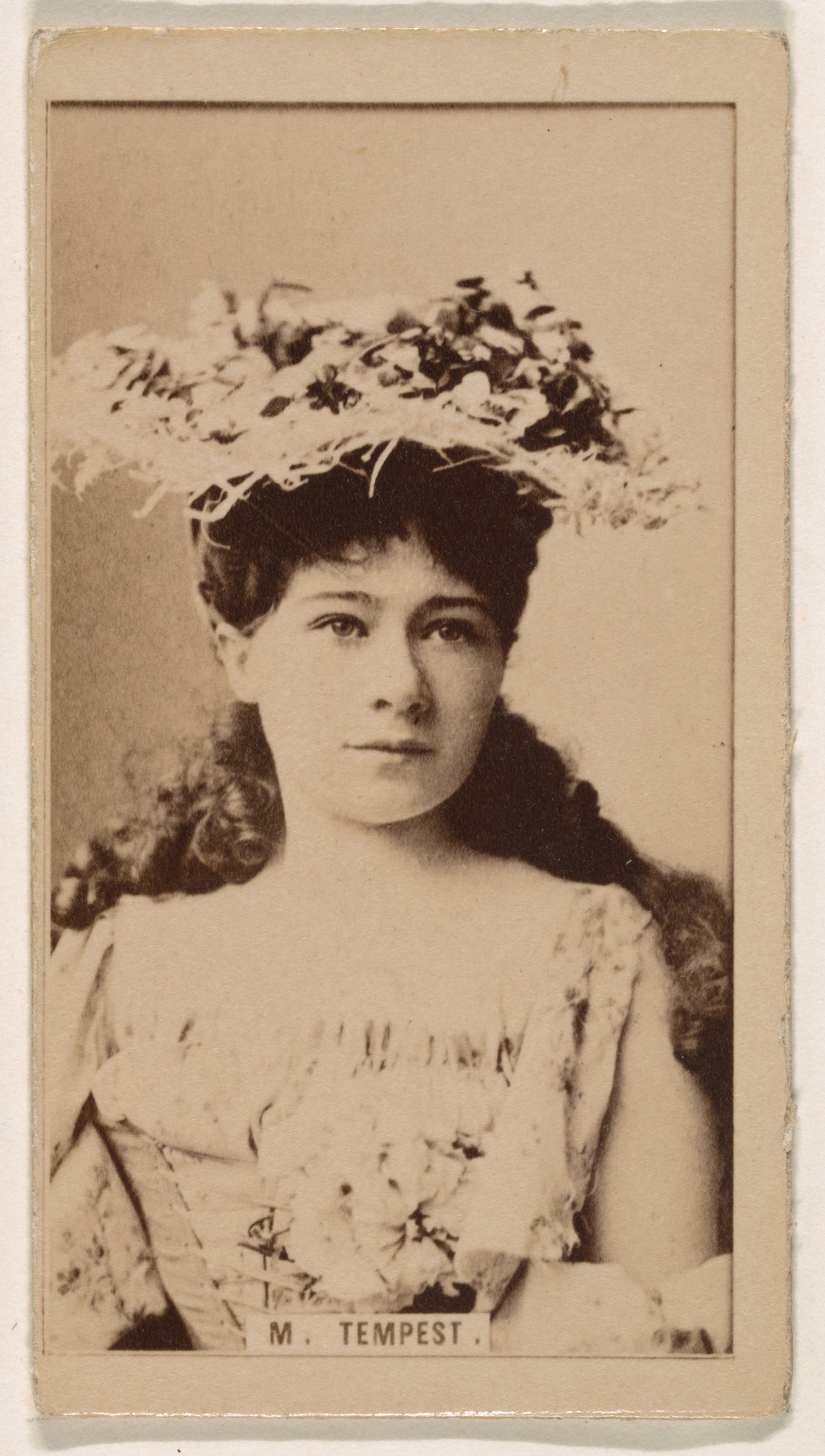
Marie Tempest 1890

The New York Times reported in late August 1891 that Richie Ling was sailing on RMS Aurania, having been signed by Rudolph Aronson for an engagement at the Casino Theatre. Ling would perform Count Stanislaus in Der Vogelhändler. For this engagement, the operetta's libretto was translated into English, and the work itself renamed The Tyrolean. Marie Tempest was also signed by Aronson for The Tyrolean, (Note: The Chicago Tribune said: "It is reported that Marie Tempest and Richie Ling, the tenor, now on their way across the Atlantic to join the Casino company, 'do not speak'. For many seasons Mr. Aronson has been engaging people who do not sing, now he has come to those who do not speak".) for which the English soprano would perform as Adam, the eponymous male lead. The Sun reported that Tempest did well in the trouser role while Ling was nervous on opening night. After two months, he was replaced in the company.

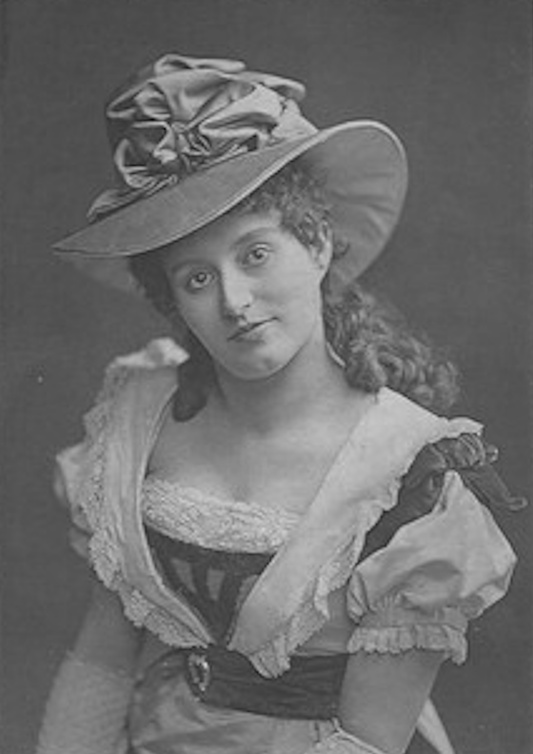
Agnes Delaporte in 1891

Following five months of occasional recitals, Ling joined the King's Opera Comique Company in Philadelphia, where he was cast for the role of Arthur in Falka, and Symon Symonovici in The Beggar Student. He is next heard of with an operetta company called The Albanians performing the Louis Varney work called The Musketeers. During late April 1893 he joined the O'Neill Grand and Comic Opera Company for a tour of the southeastern United States, which collapsed in June 1893 under the weight of temperament. The company had two prima donnas; when they quarrelled, the other members took sides. Ling and music director Max Hirschfeld sided with soprano Agnes Delaporte. He then joined the Reed Opera Company in St. Louis, where he "considerably strengthened" the troupe. After a summer season in St. Louis, Ling returned to New York to be pronounced "somewhat weak" as Philémon in Philémon et Baucis, criticism that was repeated as he played the role on tour with the Duff Opera Company.

Ling rejoined diva Agnes Delaporte in April 1894, who now headed her own company. The company's first performance at Elmira, New York drew a scathing review from the local critic, though Ling was judged the best member of the company. For the summer of 1894, Ling returned to St. Louis, this time with the Hagan Opera Company, at a venue called Terrace Park.

=== Lillian Russell ===
After three years in America, moving from one short-lived opera company to another, Ling was hired by Abbey, Schoeffel and Grau in January 1895 as leading tenor for the Lillian Russell Opera Company. This brought stability to his career and professional exposure on a national scale. He began by singing Piquillo in a revival of La Périchole at the Chicago Opera House on February 21, 1895, making "a most agreeable impression". The Chicago Tribune went further, saying Ling was "a vast improvement in the personnel of the company". The company alternated La Périchole with The Grand Duchess on a tour of major Eastern and Midwestern cities. A typical assessment of Ling on the tour was that he "sang pretty well and acted even better".

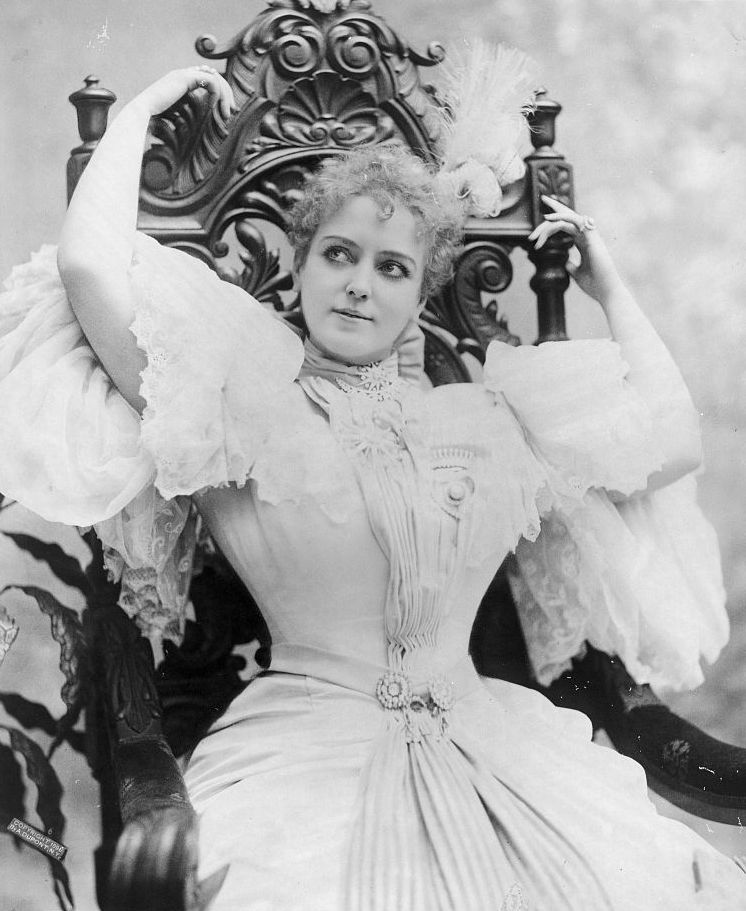
Lillian Russell in 1896

During May 1895 the Lillian Russell Opera Company debuted a new work, The Tzigane. This lacked a leading tenor role, so Ling went with the Castle Square Opera Company (Note: Max Hirschfeld, who Ling had worked with at the O'Neill Company, was now music director for Castle Square.) for the summer, but was to return to Lillian Russell's Company. Ling joined a revised The Tzigane in time for its Boston opening in September 1895, taking the minor part of Naryschkin. Russell's tour alternated The Tzigane with La Périchole, and later The Little Duke; for the latter two works Ling was the leading male.

Russell and Ling sang in the first performance of The Goddess of Truth, a new light opera by Julian Edwards and Stanislaus Stange, in Baltimore during February 1896. Later that month the opera premiered on Broadway at Abbey's Theatre. The reviewer for The New York Times was not impressed with the operetta nor Lillian Russell personally, (Note: "Periodical exhibitions of Lillian Russell are a part of the destiny of the Nation. Whether they add to the gayety of the Nation or not, they have grown greater with years. Whenever the prima donna is on the stage she fills the scene, and when she poses in her ornate draperies in the revealing glare of the calcium light, there is ample room for observation and meditation.") but grudgingly acknowledged the work's popular appeal and admitted Ling "tolerably seconded" Russell's performance. The Goddess of Truth was added to the repertoire of Russell's company, and Ling continued to tour as her leading man until Russell's voice broke down while singing La Périchole on April 30, 1896.

Ling briefly joined a summer season opera company at the American Theater in Manhattan, starting with The Bohemian Girl, followed by The Mikado, both of which he had sung before. He sailed for Europe in early June 1896, returning by September when he rejoined Russell's company for a tryout of An American Beauty, by Gustave Kerker and Hugh Morton. He toured with Russell through December, but in January 1897 rejoined the Castle Square Opera Company in Boston.

=== Castle Square Opera Company ===
At Castle Square Ling sang in The Gondoliers for the first time. Another new work for him was the eponymous role in Lohengrin, and a third was Cavalleria rusticana. He also sang in a four-act English version of Mignon. The pinnacle of his season came with Il trovatore, where he sang Manrico, his first known grand opera role. For all of these "firsts" he was paired with soprano Clara Lane; the local reviewer said they both "sang excellently". Ling was sent out with the Castle Square Opera Company for a summer season based at the Academy of Music in Baltimore. Among other works, he performed Don José in Carmen.

By July 1897, Ling was signed for Vernona Jarbeau's company in a new comic opera, The Paris Doll, by Reginald De Koven and Harry B. Smith. The initial performances took place in September 1897, with a local reviewer in New Haven, Connecticut saying "Mr. Richie Ling as Tito was by far the best vocalist in the company. His voice is of pure tenor quality and remarkably robust". Ling toured with this company until November, when he reunited with Clara Lane in a Boston Lyric Opera (Note: The new name for the Castle Square Opera Company.) production of Carmen at Chicago's Great Northern Theatre. During one performance Ling lost part of his thumb in the Act III fight between Don José and Escamillo (J. K. Murray), but finished the opera after being bandaged. While in Chicago, the Boston Lyric played its repertoire of works, including The Pirates of Penzance, for which Ling sang Frederic. Ling stayed with the company on tour, arriving back in Boston during late March 1898, where he performed through mid-April, but then quit over a $50 per week reduction in salary.

=== Later opera companies ===
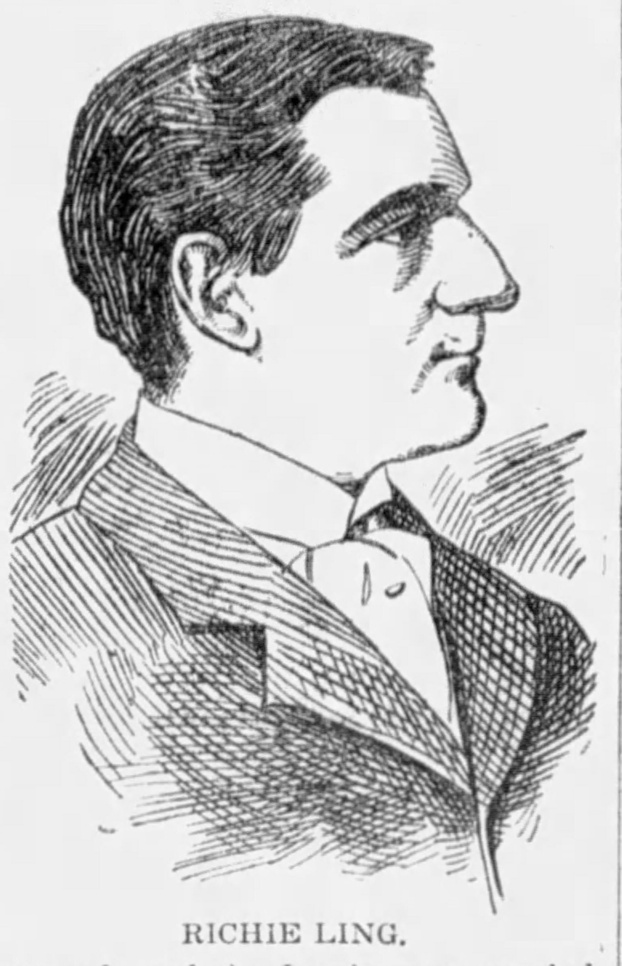
Ling in 1898

Richie Ling returned to Chicago, joining the Schiller Opera Company to sing in The Beggar Student opposite Dorothy Morton. During June 1898, after many weeks with this company, he declined the role of Rufino in Paul Jones, which he had last sung in England eight years before. This revival had been prompted by the recent naval victory of Admiral Dewey over the Spanish fleet at the Battle of Manila Bay. The libretto requires the Spanish naval officer to tear down an American flag (Note: A revision from the original, which had Jones fighting under a Union Jack before the American Revolution.) and spit on it. As an Englishman, Ling felt he couldn't get away with doing this on an American stage, so a substitute tenor was hired. Ling never regained his traction with this company, so he went to England for a visit. There he saw the original production of A Runaway Girl, and early August found him in New York as a member of Augustin Daly's company, rehearsing for the American debut of this work. However, the production debuted without Ling, who disappeared from the American stage for more than a year. (Note: A newspaper column reported that George W. Lederer claimed "there are only five or six 'acting, romantic tenors' in the world, and Richie Ling is the only one in this country". It then said that Ling "has not been heard in this country for the past two years", an exaggeration given his May 1898 performances with the Schiller Opera Company.)

When he did reappear, it was in an August 1899 benefit production of As You Like It, where he played Amiens. (Note: The Rosalind was Bijou Fernandez, Forrest Robinson was Jaques, while heavyweight boxer James J. Corbett was Charles.) He next sang opposite Alice Nielsen in The Singing Girl by Victor Herbert and Stanislaus Stange. This debuted at Her Majesty's Theatre, Montreal, on October 2, 1899. Its Broadway premiere came at the Casino Theatre on October 23, 1899, with The New York Times critic saying "Richie Ling looked well and acted satisfactorily but he did not always sing in tune". After its Broadway run ended in January 1900, Ling went on tour with The Singing Girl, but fell seriously ill in Pittsburgh during February 1900. He spent five weeks in hospital there, then was transported to New York where he was still too sick to work in May 1900. The Singing Girl company stayed on after their season to give a benefit performance for Ling in Providence, Rhode Island on May 16, 1900.

It was five months later, in October 1900, that Ling resumed singing, rejoining the Alice Nielsen Opera Company on its tour with The Singing Girl. He now also had a role in the company's alternate work, The Fortuneteller. The tour finished up playing this latter opera in Washington, D.C., during early March 1901. Alice Nielsen took her company to London next, but Ling decided to remain in America. He instead joined the Garden Theatre Opera Company for its summer season in Cleveland, where he sang for the opening in El Capitan. Ling sang opposite soprano Eleanor Kent for the season, as in The Daughter of the Regiment where he was Tony to her Marie. He finished with the title role in Fra Diavolo, taking August 1901 off to rest.

=== Musical comedy and comic opera ===
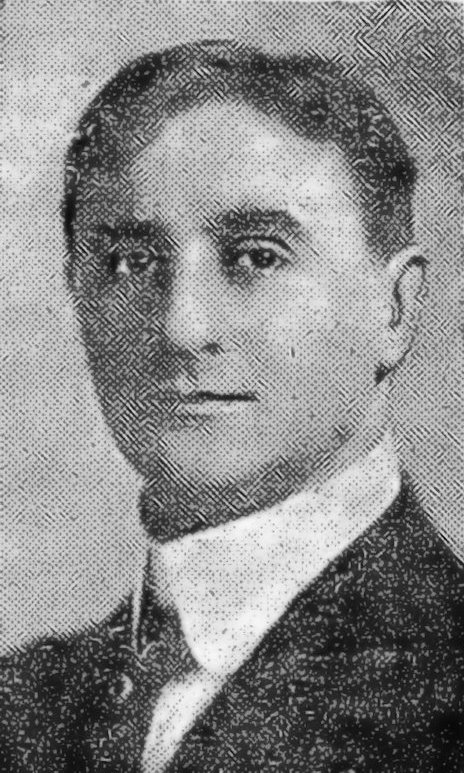
Ling in The Defender

For the next few years Ling would move back and forth between comic opera and musical comedy, with an occasional non-singing role. He joined the opera company of Lulu Glaser for Dolly Varden, by Julian Edwards and Stanislaus Stange, based on a character in Charles Dickens' Barnaby Rudge. This was a bit of a risk, for Glaser's first production, Sweet Annie Page, had failed the previous season. The work opened on September 23, 1901, at the Princess Theater in Toronto. It toured throughout the Fall, but Ling left the cast in late December 1901, when he "refused to take the usual Christmas week cut in salary". He went into a three-act comedy The Diplomat by Martha Morton in March 1902, then in June performed in the opening of a musical comedy, The Defender. This had its Broadway run in Summer 1902, followed by a tour which Ling accompanied until the production collapsed financially during December.

The Jewel of Asia, a musical comedy by George W. Lederer starring James T. Powers, was already on Broadway when Ling joined it in late February 1903, replacing Clifton Crawford. Ling continued with the show when it left Broadway in April to go on tour. He then joined the cast of the American production of A Princess of Kensington during August, and stayed through its short Broadway run.

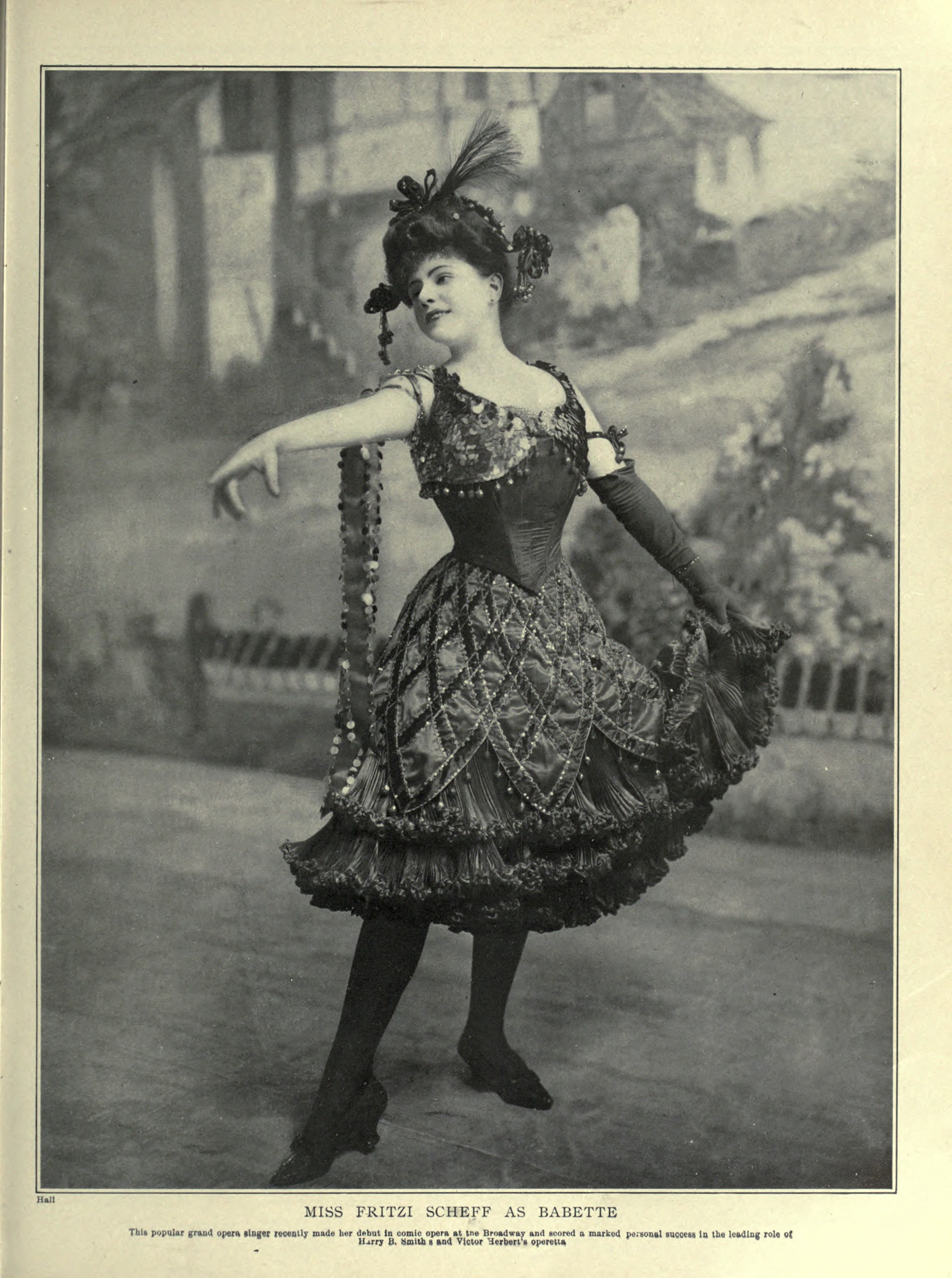
Fritzi Scheff as Babette 1904

November 1903 saw him supporting Fritzi Scheff in the opening performance of Babette at Washington, D.C., with both the composer Victor Herbert and President Roosevelt in the audience. The production had its Broadway premiere a week later. (Note: Two nights afterwards, Fritzi Scheff's green ruffled chiffon gown was snagged on the stage floor during her second act entrance, causing her to stumble forwards while the gown unraveled behind her. The quantity of material used in gowns of the time meant a complete disrobement was unlikely, nevertheless Richie Ling ran forward to free the caught material, leaving him holding several yards of chiffon, while Scheff laughed helplessly and the audience roared.) Ling stayed with the Babette tour through May 1904.

Ling returned to musical comedy in the Fall of 1904, starting with a sketchy production. The West Point Cadet was a comeback effort by Della Fox, (Note: She had been institutionalized earlier in the year.) for which she played twins, male and female. It eschewed a tryout and had a brief Broadway run, abruptly closing after only four performances. (Note: The chorus had been dismissed when they arrived for rehearsals, while the principal players were met by Della Fox, who showed them a doctor's note saying she couldn't sing for a week. The Times Square jewelry store of the show's backer, "Diamond Jack" Levy, who was Fox's husband, closed down the same day. That evening, rumors drove a crowd of chorus girls to rush the stage door watchman in a frantic effort to remove shoes, costumes and personal items. (At that time in the theatre, performers were often required to furnish their own shoes and costumes). The New-York Tribune said the production "had done next to no business since its opening".) The producers for The Baroness Fiddlesticks signed Ling shortly after The West Point Cadet debacle. This "musical satire on society" opened with tryouts in Binghamton and Rochester, New York, and premiered on Broadway at the Casino Theatre on November 21, 1904, for a limited engagement of five weeks. Ling finished out the year with a revival of Fatinitza, singing opposite Fritzi Scheff. He continued doing comic operas with Scheff, including Boccaccio in March 1905,

== US stage career ==
=== Transition to speaking roles ===
For over a year Richie Ling disappeared from the American music theater, returning in June 1906 with a new comic opera, The Alcayde, in which he sang the title role. This operetta was by Frederick Barry and George Stephens Jr., produced by James K. Hackett. It opened in Atlantic City then played Chicago for the summer season, where one local critic said Ling sang well, but the opera suffered from a weak libretto. Ling next appeared in the opening of another new comic opera, The Girl and the Governor by Julian Edwards and S. M. Brenner, produced by the actor-manager Jefferson De Angelis. The debut performance in Washington, D.C., had one reviewer report "Richie Ling... made one of the distinct vocal hits of the performance in several songs, sung in a rich tenor voice of pleasing quality." Ling toured with this production through its Broadway run in February 1907, and post-Broadway through April 1907. From late April through November 1907, Ling was on the West Coast with an opera company called "The Californians".

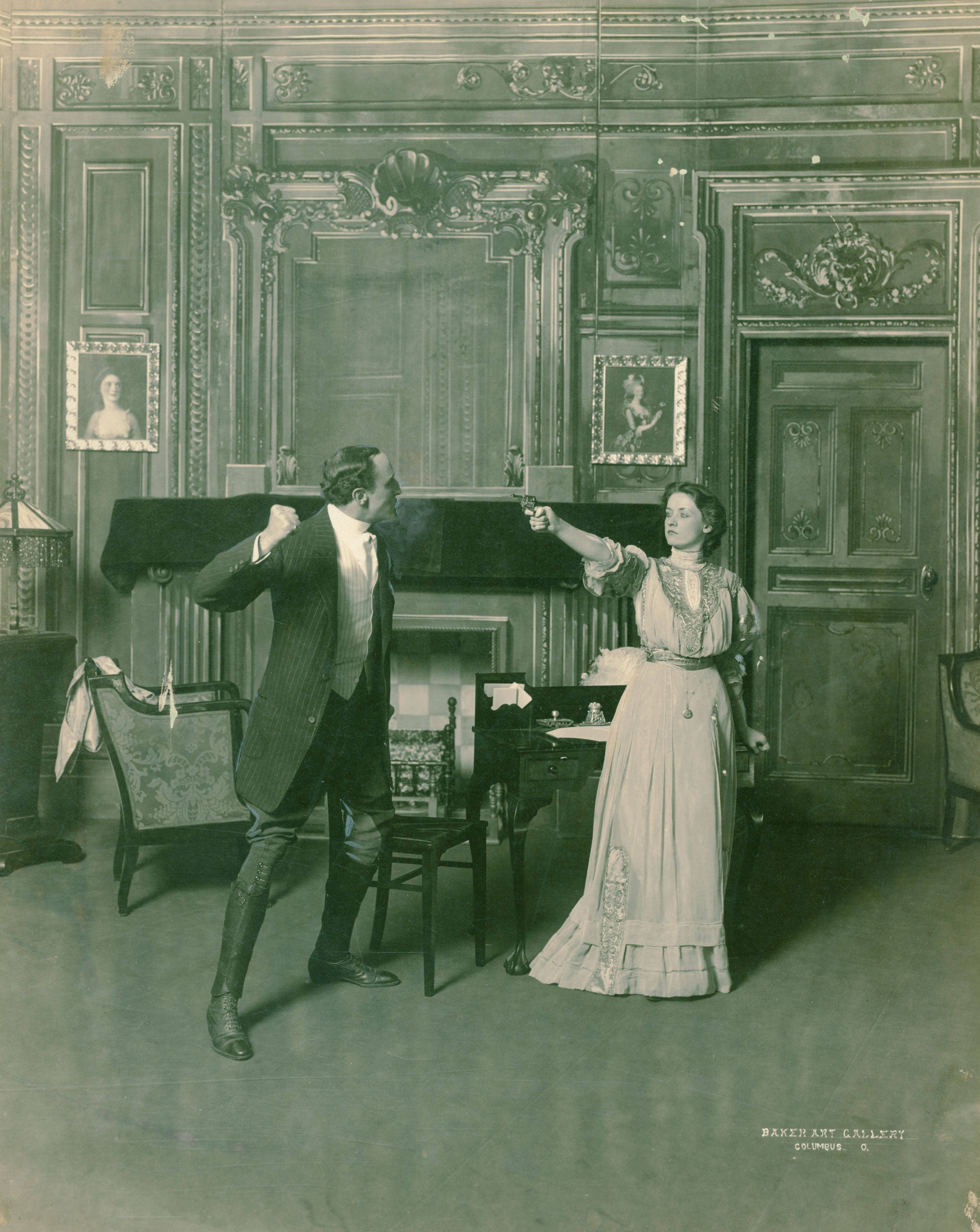

From December 1907 on Ling no longer appears in operas, though he did sometimes sing in musicals. Later accounts suggest a severe cold ended his operatic career, though the date given for this is in 1909. He joined John Cort's company supporting Maude Fealy in the American adaptation of The Stronger Sex, starting in Montana. The local reviewer in Butte said he was "probably the strongest of the supporting members", while the critic in Billings said he was "[r]anking next to Miss Fealy in cleverness, and far above the leading man...". Ling stayed with this tour through January 1908, finishing in the Midwest. He is next seen with William Farnum's company in Cleveland, appearing in The Mallet's Masterpiece during September 1908, then on Broadway in November with a principal role in Blue Grass by Paul Armstrong.

Ling was cast for The White Sister, supporting star Viola Allen, from its first performance in February 1909. He continued with the production through its Broadway run, and the start of its national tour, all the way to the end of April 1910.

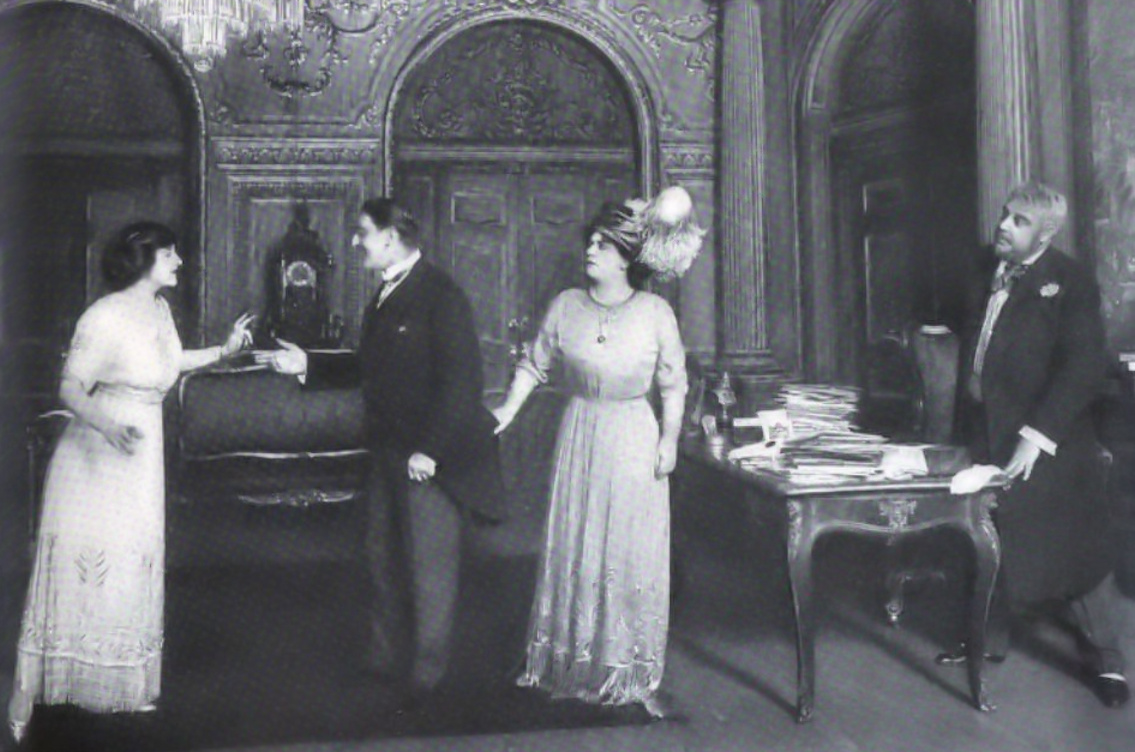

The following season he picked up with the American adaptation of Decorating Clementine in Fall 1910, followed by another adaptation from the French, The Zebra, which had a brief Broadway run starting February 1911. Will o' th' Wisp, by Alfred G. Robyn and Walter Percival, was Ling's first non-singing role in a musical comedy, playing St. Louis and Chicago during late spring and summer of 1911. Much of Ling's time in 1911 and 1912 was taken up playing featured parts in minor productions, but he had a major supporting role in A Butterfly on the Wheel, an English legal drama of divorce. The production had already played Broadway when Ling joined it in September 1912; he continued with it until late January 1913. Starting in May 1913, Ling was a principal in The Gentleman from No. 19, adapted by Mark E. Swan from a French farce.

=== The Temperamental Journey and first films ===
"Richie Ling, once a comic opera tenor, disproves the old dictum of Von Buelow that 'a tenor is not a man but a disease'. He has the best part in the play, except the artist, and he plays it with a variety and effectiveness which shows a good head as well as abundant stage skill". ---Review of The Temperamental Journey from The Brooklyn Daily Eagle

With The Temperamental Journey, produced by David Belasco, Ling was part of a Broadway hit. After a tryout in Rochester, New York during late August 1913, the production went to Broadway in September, where it premiered at the Belasco Theatre. It was adapted by Leo Ditrichstein, who also starred in it, from a 1912 French work. Ling supported Ditrichstein, with Josephine Victor and Isabel Irving completing the quartette of leads. The Broadway production ran for 123 performances, through December 20, 1913, before going on tour.

During February 1914, Ling joined the cast of What Would You Do?, which starred Bessie Barriscale. It was a rare villain's role for Ling, who drew critical praise in a failing effort. So too with What's Wrong?, a question the local reviewer answered in detail at the Washington, D.C. tryout during May 1914. Ling finished out 1914 and the Winter of 1915 playing on the road in a second company for the hit A Pair of Sixes.

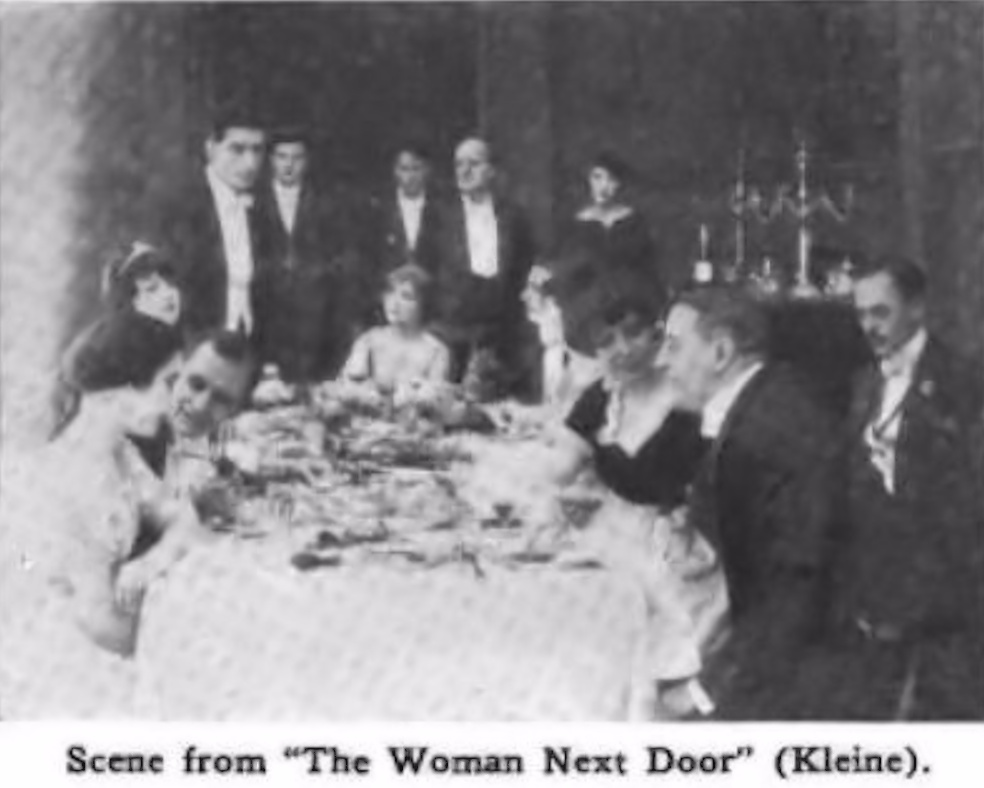

His first three silent films were made over the Summer of 1915 at the George Kleine Studios in New York. He was by no means a lead in any of these films, but played supporting and character parts. First up was The Woman Next Door, started the last week of June 1915. Irene Fenwick was the star of this and the other movies Ling made this year. The second film to be made was The Green Cloak, a murder mystery in which Ling played a butler with a secret knowledge of the eventual murder victim. The third picture, The Sentimental Lady, was shot in early September at both the studio and on location at Saranac Lake, New York, by which time The Woman Next Door had been showing to audiences for several weeks. It is now considered to be a lost film, but copies of The Green Cloak and The Sentimental Lady survive.

=== Chu Chin Chow and later films ===
Chu Chin Chow had been playing in London for two seasons before an American production had its Broadway premiere on October 22, 1917. Reviewer Ralph Block said "the singing is mediocre" and "the ballets are undistinguished", but was full of praise for the sounds, settings, costumes, and characters that evoked a fantasy Baghdad from a thousand years ago. Initially, Ling had a featured role as Otbah for this production, but when Chu Chin Chow moved to the Century Theatre during January 1918, he took over the role of Ali Baba from Henry Dixey. This was a leading part that required singing, which Ling had not done professionally for many years, nevertheless, The Daily Standard Union said "Richie Ling makes an impressive Ali". Ling's fourth silent film, The Imposter, starring Ann Murdock, was released this same month.

Chu Chin Chow went on tour in August 1918, with Ling continuing as Ali Baba. During the tour Ling's fifth silent film, Come On In starring Shirley Mason, was released. The tour finished up in Toronto during early May 1919, after which a revival was announced for Broadway the following August 4, 1919.

=== Actors' Strike of 1919 ===
During late July 1919, Richie Ling was in rehearsals for the revival of Chu Chin Chow at the Century Theatre. The producers, F. Ray Comstock and Morris Gest, had failed to issue any contracts to the performers after ten days of rehearsals. The presiding council for Actors' Equity Association (Equity) decided to select this production for a demonstration strike starting July 29, 1919. However, they failed to plan in advance; instead, they relied on personally visiting the theater on the day in question. Ling had been tipped off by Frank Gilmore and so didn't come to the rehearsal that day. Three other principals, including Marjorie Wood who was opposed to Equity affiliating with the American Federation of Labor, were persuaded by Morris Gest to ignore the callout, while the remaining cast never received word of the action until the next day. Ling stayed out on July 30, 1919, but was joined by only three other performers: Lucy Beaumont, Ida Mulle, and Clara Verdara. These four became Equity's first Gold Star members. The general strike, which began in early August, was successfully concluded in thirty days, but Ling was out of a job and didn't appear on Broadway again until April 1920. Ed Wynn, one of the few actor-managers who had sided with Equity, brought Ling into his "carnival", a large-scale vaudeville show mounted at the New Amsterdam Theatre starting April 5, 1920. The New York Herald said: "Richie Ling received a hand as much for his acting as for his historic position as the first striking actor in history". (Note: A bit of hyperbole on the part of the writer, for the White Rats of America had struck in February 1901.) Ling served on Equity's Council for several years following the strike.

=== Broadway 1921-1926 ===
Richie Ling appeared in a half-dozen Broadway shows during this time, starting with the short-lived Sonny in August 1921. Some had respectable length runs, such as The National Anthem, a scolding drama by J. Hartley Manners decrying gin-swilling flappers and jazz (the anthem of the title), and Rose Briar, a Booth Tarkington comedy, both opening in 1922. He was at best a supporting player in these productions, and more often played a featured character part, as in the 1923 revival of the melodrama Sweet Nell of Old Drury. He did draw critical praise for his supporting role in the long-running The Swan, and in the revival of Shaw's Candida.

=== The Road to Rome ===
Playing his last leading role, Ling would be occupied with this production from January 1927 through June 1928. The star was Jane Cowl, who played a much younger fictional Greco-Roman wife to Ling's Roman senator, Fabius Maximus. The second lead was Philip Merivale, who portrayed Hannibal. For dramatic purposes, Ling's character was intentionally depicted as farcical and indecisive by playwright Robert E. Sherwood, a far cry from the historical general who devised the Fabian strategy. It was a thankless role, the insuffiency of the middle-aged husband meant to point up the vigor of the masterful Hannibal, nevertheless Ling did draw some praise from critics Burns Mantle and Rowland Field.

=== Last years on Broadway ===
Following his success in The Road to Rome, Ling had good parts in Olympia, one of Ferenc Molnár's more bitter works, and in the long-running A. A. Milne mystery comedy, The Perfect Alibi. Both had opened in 1928, with the Milne play running well into 1929. However, Ling did not appear again on Broadway until October 1931 with a flop called Divorce Me, Dear. He appeared the following February in another Milne play, the moralizing They Don't Mean Any Harm. A year later he was in For Services Rendered, a short-lived Somerset Maugham drama of family life in the wake of The Great War. The historical "docudrama" Yellow Jack was Ling's first performance in 1934. This was followed by the long-running Moss Hart-Desmond Carter musical celebrating the work of Johann Strauss Sr. and Jr., The Great Waltz. Ling played Herr Hartkopf, a music publisher who hates music. He told an interviewer in January 1935 that his last singing performance had been for Ed Wynn's Carnival in 1920. During October 1935, Ling opened in another Broadway musical, Jubilee.

== Personal life ==
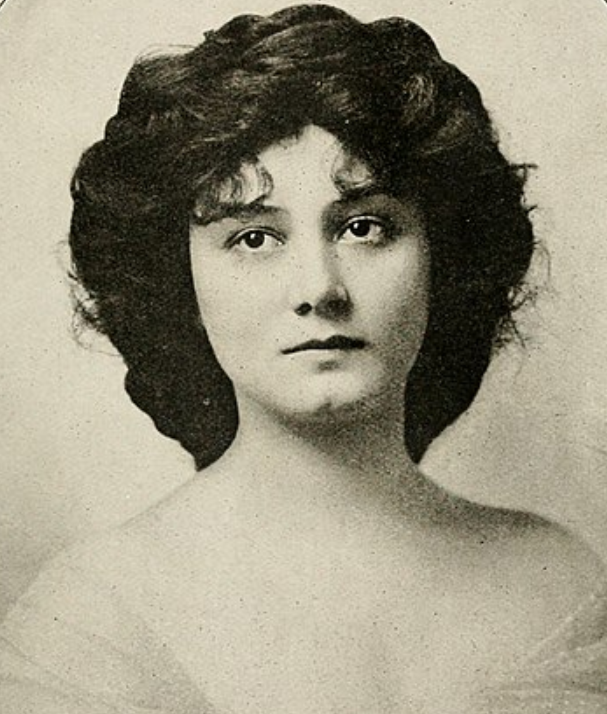
Lotta Faust 1905

A New York arriving passenger list from RMS Oceanic during December 1910 described him as being of British nationality, 5 ft 9 1/2 in (177 cm) with brown hair, and blue eyes. Despite his many years in the United States, there is no record of him applying for citizenship. Ling was a member of the New York City Garrick Club during 1895. By 1898 he belonged to the Lambs Club, and later Players. He was well known enough among fencers in New York to agree to a bout with actress Louida Hilliard in 1904.

While touring with Lillian Russell in 1895, a newspaper article suggested Ling and she were a couple. They were observed to go bicycling together and always stayed at the same hotel. Both Russell and Ling denied the rumors. Ling's longtime best friend was another English actor in America, Guy Standing.

Ling married actress Charlotte Faust on November 9, 1902, when both were performing in The Defender. In a 1904 interview, Faust revealed that Ling actually went by "Dick" offstage. A highly colored account suggests the couple became estranged when Ling spent seven months on the West Coast in 1907 while Faust was back in New York. She filed for divorce in October 1909 on grounds of desertion, but died in January 1910 before a final decree was issued.

He then married Rose Beatrice Winter, née Jones, a prima donna for Eddie Foy's company, on December 26, 1912, in Wilmington, Delaware. She was also English, who used her ex-husband's surname on stage. This marriage ended in divorce.

== Death ==
Ling died on March 5, 1937, in his room at the Lamb's Club in Manhattan. He had just completed a Broadway run in And Now Goodbye on February 22, 1937, but was feeling low over the recent death of his old friend Guy Standing. According to unnamed club members, he had come down for breakfast, but felt ill and returned to bed. He was found there by a page boy sent to call him for lunch, dead of heart disease. He had no children; his survivors were a sister in South Australia and a niece in London. Obituaries at the time contained two common errors: overestimating his age as 70 or 71; and claiming he was the first to sing In the Good Old Summer Time, during the original run of The Defender in 1902. (Note: This latter error was a result of confusing Ling's songs in the musical, with those of his first wife Charlotte Faust, who had replaced Blanche Ring as Millie Canvass in The Defender.)

== Operatic credits ==
Performances by year of Ling's first involvement, excluding later productions of the same work.

Year	Play	Role	Venue	Notes/Sources
1888	The Bey of Tunis	Prince Luigi	Portland Hall, Southsea	
1888	Paul Jones	Rufino de Martinez	Touring Company	Ling played the villain, a Spanish naval officer, for 18 months.
1891	The Tyrolean	Count Stanislaus	Casino Theatre	The three-act comic opera by Carl Zeller was the opener for the one-act Cavalleria Rusticana.
1892	Falka	Arthur	Empire Theatre	
1892	The Beggar Student	Symon Symonovici	Empire Theatre	
1893	The Musketeers	Gontran de Solanges	Rutland Opera House	Ling would perform this same role later in the year for the Reed Opera Company.
1893	Iolanthe		New York Athletic Club	A two-performance benefit for the club.
1893	The Mikado	Nanki-Poo	Touring company	
1893	Faust	Faust	Touring company	
1893	Billee Taylor	Bille Taylor	Schnaider's Garden	
1893	Fatinitza	Julian Hardy (Note: The name as used in English translations of the opera; the original had it as Julian von Golz.)	Schnaider's Garden	
1893	Patience	Archibald Grosvenor	Schnaider's Garden	The local paper noted Ling's tenor voice in what is usually a baritone part.
1893	The Queen's Lace Handkerchief	Cervantes	Schnaider's Garden	
1893	Tennessee	Milton Hardluck	Schnaider's Garden	An original comic opera (Note: Described as being by a St. Louis composer named Edwards and an Evansville, Indiana newspaperman called John Campbell Greig.) satirizing the state militia during a coal miner's strike.
1893	Philémon et Baucis	Philémon	Herrmann's Theatre	This was the two-act version, performed in English with just the four principals and a chorus.
1894	Faust	Faust	Elmira Opera House	The Agnes Delaporte Grand Opera Company (Note: The orchestra for this "Grand Opera Company" consisted of a single piano.) played just the first, third, and fifth acts.
1894	Galatea	Pygmalion	Elmira Opera House	The local reviewer explicitly declined to comment on this production.
1894	Dorothy	Geoffrey Wilder	Terrace Park	
1894	The Bohemian Girl	Thaddeus	Terrace Park	
1894	The Merry War	Marquis (Note: "Marchese Sebastiano" in the original operetta.)	Terrace Park	
1894	Pagliacci	Canio	Terrace Park	This was done in English according to a local reviewer.
1894	Trial by Jury	The Defendant	Terrace Park	
1894	Boccaccio	Pietro	Terrace Park	
1894	Amorita		Terrace Park	
1895	La Périchole	Piquillo	Chicago Opera House; Touring company	This was Ling's first performance with Lillian Russell and her company.
1895	Grand Duchess	Fritz Schimmel	Touring company	
1895	Giroflé-Girofla	Marasquin	Castle Square Theatre	This was an English-language version of the opera.
1895	Clover; or the Search for Luck	Rudolph	Castle Square Theater	An English adaptation of Die Jagd nach dem Glücke by Franz von Suppé.
1895	The Bohemian Girl	Thaddeus	Castle Square Theatre	Ling had performed this role the previous summer in Terrace Park.
1895	The Brigands	Duke of Mantua	Castle Square Theatre	An English-language version; Ling's role was normally a baritone.
1895	The Chimes of Normandy	Jean Grenicheux	Castle Square Theatre	Irene Murphy sang Serpolette without a rehearsal and only three hours notice.
1895	Maritana	Don César de Bazan	Castle Square Theatre	Ling's acting, as well as his singing, was celebrated by the Boston critic.
1895	The Tzigane	Naryschkin	Touring company	Three-act comic opera by Reginald De Koven with libretto by Harry B. Smith.
1895	The Little Duke	Montlandry (Note: The role was originally for a baritone but was adapted for Ling's tenor voice in this production.)	Touring company	New English adaptation of Charles Lecocq's opera was by stage manager Max Freeman.
1896	The Goddess of Truth	Michael (Sculptor)	Academy of Music; Abbey's Theatre	A light opera by Julian Edwards and Stanislaus Stange, loosely based on the Galatea myth.
1896	An American Beauty	Richard Grenville	Touring company	Comic opera by Gustave Kerker and Hugh Morton.
1897	The Gondoliers	Marco Palmieri	Castle Square Theatre	
1897	Lohengrin	Lohengrin	Castle Square Theatre	This work was performed with an English libretto.
1897	Cavalleria rusticana	Turiddu	Castle Square Theatre	
1897	Mignon	Wilhelm Meister	Castle Square Theatre	
1897	Il trovatore	Manrico	Castle Square Theatre	
1897	Satanella	Rupert	Castle Square Theatre	
1897	Carmen	Don José	Academy of Music	
1897	The Paris Doll	Tito	Touring company	A reviewer claimed this work was "hardly opera", and labelled it "musical comedy" instead.
1897	The Pirates of Penzance	Frederic	Great Northern Theatre	
1899	The Singing Girl	Count Otto	Touring company Casino Theatre	
1901	The Fortune Teller	Capt. Ladislas	Touring company	
1901	El Capitan	Count Hernando Verrada	Garden Theater (Cleveland)	
1901	The Daughter of the Regiment	Tony	Garden Theater (Cleveland)	
1901	Erminie	Eugène Marcel	Garden Theater (Cleveland)	
1901	Amorita	Angelo	Garden Theater (Cleveland)	
1901	Fra Diavolo	Fra Diavolo	Garden Theater (Cleveland)	
1901	Dolly Varden	Capt. Hoarce Belleville	Touring company	A two-act opera by Julian Edwards and Stanislaus Stange, based on Charles Dickens Barnaby Rudge.
1903	A Princess of Kensington	Brook Green	Broadway Theatre	
1903	Babette	Marcel	Broadway Theatre	A tale of the 17th Century Dutch revolt against Spanish rule.
1905	Boccaccio	Leonetta	Broadway Theatre	Ling had previously sang Pietro in this comic opera.
1906	The Alcayde	Don Manuel de Mendoza	Touring company	Story of Spanish Moors, the Alcayde being the young ruler of Seville.
1906	The Girl and the Governor	Dick Kingsley	Touring company Manhattan Theatre	Fictional South American colony in 16th Century is setting for this work.
1907	Robin Hood	Robin Hood	Touring company	Revival by a touring group calling themselves "The Californians".
1907	The Serenade	Lopez	Touring company	Revival by The Californians.

== Dramatic credits ==
Stage performances (including musical comedies) by year of Ling's first involvement.
Year	Play	Role	Venue	Notes/Sources
1891	Jim the Penman	Lord Drelincourt		
1891	Sweepstakes	Bertie Grant	Terry's Theatre	A one-act three-character musical comedy by Ernest Lake.
1891	A Scilian Idyll	Chorus	Vaudeville Theatre	A pastoral musical by John Todhunter.
1899	As You Like It	Amiens	Larchmont Yacht Club	A one-time outdoors benefit production for the St. Johns Episcopal Church in Larchmont.
1902	The Diplomat	Julian Shipman Rossiter	Madison Square Theatre	Three-act comedy by Martha Morton
1902	The Defender	Charles Dare	Touring company Herald Square Theatre	Ling met Lotta Faust, who became his first wife, through this musical.
1903	The Jewel of Asia	Yussuf Potiphar	Criterion Theatre	Ling replaced Clifton Crawford in this role on Broadway.
1904	The West Point Cadet	Ernest Everett	Princess Theatre	Three-act musical comedy adapted from a French original by A. M. Norden.
1904	Baroness Fiddlesticks	Archer	Casino Theatre	
1907	The Stronger Sex	Oliver Thorpe	Touring company	
1908	The Mallet's Masterpiece		Touring company	
1908	Blue Grass	Van Day Parker	Touring company	Kentucky racing melodrama by Paul Armstrong.
1909	The White Sister	Lieutenant Basili	Touring company Daly's Theatre	Ling played in this four-act drama from February 1909 through April 1910.
1910	Compromise	David Durand	Majestic Theatre; Touring company	One-act play starring William Hawtrey, with Agnes Marc and Paul Pilkington.
1910	Decorating Clementine	Paul Margerie	Lyceum Theatre	An English-language adaptation of Le Bois sacré by de Caillavet and de Flers.
1911	The Zebra	Col. George De Peyster	Garrick Theatre	Three-act farce, adapted by Paul M. Potter from Le Zèbre by Nicolas Nancey and Paul Armont.
1911	Will o' th' Wisp	Ralph Dean	Olympic Theatre; Studebaker Theater	Musical comedy set in Heidelberg and Paris.
1911	Dear Old Billy	Perks	Whitney Opera House	William Hawtrey's London hit did not play well in Chicago.
1911	The Lovely Liar		English's Theatre	Louise Dresser musical comedy was "smothered" in "verbiage".
1912	The Come-on		Touring company	A one-act vaudeville play with Hale Hamilton, supported by Ling and Inez Macauley.
1912	A Butterfly on the Wheel	George Admaston	Touring company	An English cast for this drama of a London divorce court.
1913	The Gentleman from No. 19	Benjamin	Touring company	Three-act farce adapted by Mark E. Swan from Une Nuit de Noces by Andre Keroul and Albert Barré.
1913	The Temperamental Journey	Billy Shepherd	Lyceum Theatre; Belasco Theatre; Republic Theater	Adapted by Leo Ditrichstein from Pour Vivre Heureux by André Rivoire and Yves Mirande.
1914	What Would You Do?	Howard M. Smote	Touring company	Four-act melodrama about a profligate wife married to a bank clerk.
1914	What's Wrong	Perry Dodge	Touring company	Three-act comedy about overworked American businessmen.
1914	A Pair of Sixes	Thomas Vanderholdt	Touring company	Ling was engaged for a road company of this Broadway hit.
1916	The Devil's Invention		Touring company	Ling played a lawyer trying to help Dr. Hale (William B. Mack).
1917	Chu Chin Chow	Otbah/Ali Baba	Manhattan Opera House; Century Theatre	Ling appeared in this American adaptation for over 200 performances.
1920	Ed Wynn's Carnival		New Amsterdam Theatre; Selwyn Theatre	This was a vaudeville revue which ran from April through August 1920.
1921	Sonny	Harper Craig	Cort Theatre	Comedy with incidental songs by George V. Hobart.
1922	The National Anthem	Reuben Hale	Henry Miller's Theatre	Four-act drama by J. Hartley Manners starring his wife Laurette Taylor.
1922	Rose Briar	Little	Empire Theatre	Comedy by Booth Tarkington starred Billie Burke.
1923	Sweet Nell of Old Drury	Lord Rochester	48th Street Theatre	Revival of Paul Kester melodrama starred Laurette Taylor.
1923	The Swan	Caesar	Cort Theatre	By Ferenc Molnár, this romantic comedy starred Eva Le Gallienne and Basil Rathbone.
1925	Candida	Mr. Burgess	Comedy Theatre	Revival of Shaw's three-act comedy.
1927	The Road to Rome	Fabius Maximus	Playhouse Theatre	Ling's longest role, from January 1927 through June 1928.
1928	Olympia	Colonel Krehl	Empire Theatre	Ling is a "blundering police official" in this anti-royalist story by Ferenc Molnár.
1928	The Perfect Alibi	Edward P. Carter	Charles Hopkins Theatre	A "detective comedy" by A. A. Milne, with Ling as "arch-villain", produced and staged by Charles Hopkins.
1931	Divorce Me, Dear	Geoffrey Lawrence	Avon Theatre (New York City)	Three-act comedy flop by Katherine Rogers was staged by Antoinette Perry.
1932	They Don't Mean Any Harm	James	Charles Hopkins Theatre	Ling is "a man of God" in this preachy work by A. A. Milne.
1933	For Services Rendered	Leonard Ardsley	Booth Theatre	Somerset Maugham's grim drama on the after effects of The Great War.
1934	Yellow Jack	Colonel Tory	Martin Beck Theatre	Dramatization of the fight against Yellow fever.
1934	The Great Waltz	Herr Hartkopf	Center Theatre	Though a musical, Ling had a speaking role.
1935	Jubilee	Lord Wyndham	Imperial Theatre	
1937	And Now Goodbye	Dr. Ringwood	John Golden Theatre	Ling's last performance was in this aptly named and short-running drama.

== Filmography ==
Film (by year of first release)
Year	Title	Role	Notes & Cites
1915	The Woman Next Door	Ben Whittier	The first of three five-reel silent films Ling made with star Irene Fenwick for George Kleine.
1915	The Green Cloak	Wilkins	
1915	The Sentimental Lady	Johnson	
1918	The Imposter	Loftus Walford	Some scenes were filmed inside the Plaza Hotel with actual guests in the background.
1918	Come On In	The Colonel	

== Bibliography ==
- Robert Emmet Sherwood. The Road to Rome. Charles Scribner's Sons, New York, 1927.
- Alfred Harding. The Revolt of the Actors. William Morrow & Company, New York, 1929.
