= The Temperamental Journey =

1913 play by Leo Ditrichstein

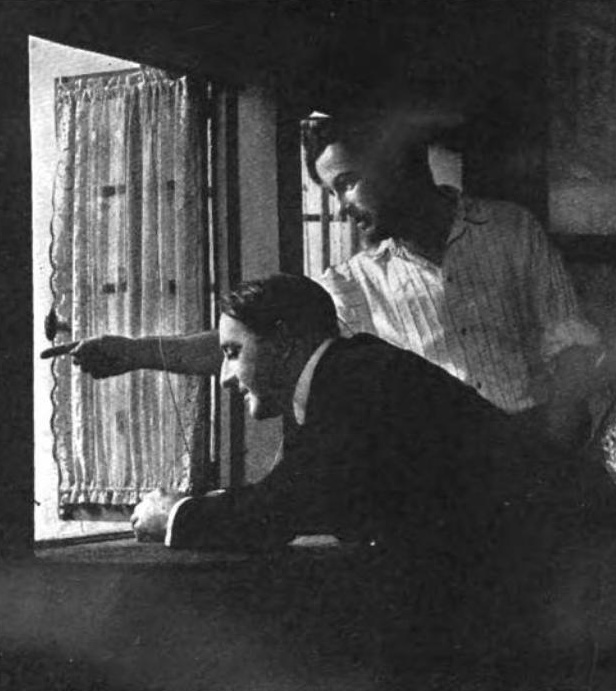
- Richie Ling and Leo Ditrichstein
- Original language: English
- Written by: Leo Ditrichstein
- Based on: Pour Vivre Heureux by André Rivoire and Yves Mirande
- Subject: Artist mortality brings commercial success
- Genre: Comedy
- Setting: The Italian Inn, a Greenwich Village studio, the Shepherd's home.

Premiere
- Date: September 4, 1913
- Place: Belasco Theatre
- Directed by: Leo Ditrichstein

The Temperamental Journey, originally titled Such Is Life, is a 1913 play by Leo Ditrichstein, adapted from Pour Vivre Heureux by André Rivoire and Yves Mirande. It is a three-act comedy with three settings and twenty characters. The story concerns an unhappy artist who survives a suicide attempt but is assumed to have died, and finds the commercial success in "death" that escaped him in life.

The play was produced by David Belasco, staged by Ditrichstein who also starred, with Isabel Irving, Josephine Victor, Richie Ling, and Cora Witherspoon in support. It had a tryout in San Francisco under its original name in June 1913, and another in Rochester, New York in late August 1913, before its Broadway premiere in September 1913. It ran through December 1913 for 123 performances, started on tour in Brooklyn, but closed down when Ditrichstein fell seriously ill.

The play was never revived on Broadway, nor adapted for other media.

== Characters ==
Characters are listed in order of appearance within their scope.

Lead

- Jacques Dupont is a landscape artist, who eschews commercialism for individuality in his painting. (Note: The tryouts had this character's name as Stephen Blake.)

Supporting

- Vernon Neil is a successful dauber without artistic vision, who is having an affair with Delphine.
- Billy Shepherd is Jacques' friend and confidant, a composer who shares his studio space.
- Delphine Dupont is nagging wife to Jacques, and his former model. She is crass and materialistic.
- Maria Tamburri is a kind and cheerful Italian-American girl with whom Jacques is in love.
- Fanny Lamont is Billy's practical fiancée, who will wait to marry him until they can afford it.

Featured

- Prof Babcock Roland
- Dorval is a picture dealer who bought low from Dupont and sells high after his "death".
- Howard Locke (Note: This small part was added for the Rochester tryout and Broadway.)
- Carrington McLiss is an Associated Press reporter covering the funeral, whose French is erratic.
- Tamburri is Marie's father, who owns the Italian Inn on the Connecticut shore of Long Island Sound.
- Roy is a young painter.
- Max is an art tutor.
- Edna is an art student.
- Eleanor
- Marjorie
- Lina
- Teresa is a waitress at the Italian Inn.

Bit Players

- Maid
- Messenger

== Synopsis ==
The play was never published; this synopsis is compiled from contemporaneous newspaper and magazine reviews.

Act I (Front patio of the Italian Inn, late afternoon.) Jacques Dupont is discouraged when Dorval, who has purchased some of his prior works at very low prices, decides not to buy any more. His supposed friend Vernon Neil urges him to paint in a more popular style, but Jacques refuses to compromise. Maria Tamburri momentarily lifts his spirits when she gives him $285 from "a gentleman in a motor car" who bought two of his paintings. But Billy Shepherd accidentally reveals there was no sale; Maria gave Jacques her savings and the two paintings are in her room. Jacques gives Maria her money back but tells her to keep the pictures. Hungry, he goes to eat his supper at the inn, but finds that Delphine has already eaten both dinners. She nags him about his inability to sell canvases, comparing him unfavorably to Neil. Depressed, with evening dark approaching, Jacques wanders down to the pier where he leaves his hat and coat, the latter with a suicide note in it. He walks off the pier into the water. (Curtain)

Act II (The Greenwich Village studio shared by Dupont and Shepherd, two weeks later.) A body having been found, Delphine has identified it as her husband. Now that he is dead, public opinion on Jacques Dupont's work has reversed. His paintings are esteemed and command high prices. Dorval now regrets not buying the last two works offered him, but Maria refuses to sell them. Billy Shepherd is too sorrowful to attend the funeral, so Fanny Lamont will go instead. The funeral cortège includes an art museum director and other notables. A wreath with the message "Rest in Peace" is in the studio. Delphine asks Fanny to have the florist add a postscript: "Until I Come". Left alone in the studio at last, Billy is surprised to hear someone come in from the bath: It is Jacques! Dupont explains that once in the water he started swimming and couldn't stop. A passing yacht rescued him on its way to Halifax, Nova Scotia. It took Jacques two weeks to make his return to Manhattan. As Billy and Jacques watch the funeral from the studio window, Jacques wants to reveal himself. But when he sees his widow embracing Neil, he decides to stay "dead". He leaves for France instead. (Curtain)

Act III (The drawing room of the Shepherd's new home, three years later.) Billy having made a success with composing music, he and Fanny have married and bought a house in Manhattan. Wearing a disguise and calling himself "M. Lenoire", an art collector, Jacques has brought thirty original Dupont canvases to America. He visits the Shepherds, who previously alerted, have assembled some wealthy art patrons to view them, and invited Maria. However, Delphine and her new husband Neil crash the private showing. She has six of Neil's paintings upon which she has forged Dupont's signature. Outraged, Jacques reveals himself, and chaos ensues. The practical Fanny and calm Billy broker a peace agreement: Jacques and Delphine will get a quiet divorce, he will give her some money, then he and Maria will marry and return to France. (Curtain)

== Original production ==
=== Background ===
Pour Vivre Heureux by André Rivoire and Yves Mirande had its premiere at the Théâtre de la Renaissance in Paris, on January 16, 1912. David Belasco "secured the American rights to the play immediately after the first performance". He entrusted its adaptation for the American stage to Leo Ditrichstein, who had a proven track record in successfully adapting European stage works, such as Are You a Mason? (1901) and The Concert (1910).

The Great Adventure by Arnold Bennett had premiered in London during March 1913, and was still running there when The Temperamental Journey was in rehearsals. This play concerned an artist, already famous, who takes the place of his recently deceased valet. The artist gets some peace and quiet, the valet gets a state funeral. But when the artist needs to raise some money, he encounters difficulty selling his own new work, and so seeks to reclaim his own identity.

Because the original tryout for The Temperamental Journey was done in California under the title Such Is Life, New York newspaper theatrical departments weren't aware of it. An article in The New York Times suggested the play was as yet unnamed, had been prepared in secrecy, and leaned on Bennett's work. A Broadway version of The Great Adventure was due to premiere in October 1913, leading to questions of similarities in the two plays. David Belasco wrote an open letter to The New York Times, explaining the chronology of his production, but was countered by publisher George H. Doran who pointed out Bennett's play was based on his own novel Buried Alive, a book published by Doran's company in 1908.

=== Cast ===
Principal cast during the tryouts and the Broadway run. Production on hiatus from June 30 through August 28, 1913.
Role	Actor	Dates	Notes and sources
Jacques Dupont	Leo Ditrichstein	Jun 23, 1913 - Dec 20, 1913	
Vernon Neil	Kernan Cripps	Jun 23, 1913 - Jun 29, 1913	
Vernon Neil	Frank Connor	Aug 29, 1913 - Dec 20, 1913	
Billy Shepherd	John A. Butler	Jun 23, 1913 - Jun 29, 1913	
Billy Shepherd	Richie Ling	Aug 29, 1913 - Dec 20, 1913	
Delphine Dupont	Isabel Irving	Jun 23, 1913 - Dec 20, 1913	
Maria Tamburri	Madge West	Jun 23, 1913 - Jun 29, 1913	She was a member of Ditrichstein's company, along with Irving and Witherspoon.
Maria Tamburri	Josephine Victor	Aug 29, 1913 - Dec 20, 1913	
Fanny Lamont	Cora Witherspoon	Jun 23, 1913 - Dec 20, 1913	
Prof Babcock Roland	John Ellicot	Jun 23, 1913 - Jun 29, 1913	
Prof Babcock Roland	Henry Bergman	Aug 29, 1913 - Dec 20, 1913	
Dorval	Burt Wesner	Jun 23, 1913 - Jun 29, 1913	
Dorval	Edouard Durand	Aug 29, 1913 - Dec 20, 1913	
Howard Locke	Julian Little	Aug 29, 1913 - Dec 20, 1913	Little was a member of Newport society whom Belasco recruited for the stage.
Carrington McLiss	Lee Millar	Jun 23, 1913 - Dec 20, 1913	Millar was one of two Alcazar Stock Company actors brought East for this play.
Tamburri	Roy Clements	Jun 23, 1913 - Jun 29, 1913	
Tamburri	Daniel Schatts	Aug 29, 1913 - Dec 20, 1913	
Roy	Edmund Lowe	Jun 23, 1913 - Jun 29, 1913	
Roy	Edwin R. Wolfe	Aug 29, 1913 - Dec 20, 1913	
Max	Louis Bennison	Jun 23, 1913 - Jun 29, 1913	
Max	Earl W. Grant	Aug 29, 1913 - Dec 20, 1913	
Edna	Alice Patek	Jun 23, 1913 - Jun 29, 1913	
Edna	Carrie Clark	Aug 29, 1913 - Dec 20, 1913	
Eleanor	Anne McNaughton	Jun 23, 1913 - Dec 20, 1913	McNaughton was the other Alcazar Stock Company member to go to Broadway.
Marjorie	Ethel McFarland	Jun 23, 1913 - Jun 29, 1913	
Marjorie	Dorothy Ellis	Aug 29, 1913 - Dec 20, 1913	
Lina	TBD	Jun 23, 1913 - Jun 29, 1913	Played by an actress from the Alcazar Theatre Stock Company.
Lina	Annette Tyler	Aug 29, 1913 - Dec 20, 1913	
Teresa	Anne Livingston	Jun 23, 1913 - Jun 29, 1913	Livingston was also a member of Ditrichstein's own company.
Teresa	Gertrud Morsini	Aug 29, 1913 - Dec 20, 1913	

=== Tryouts ===
The play was first performed as Such Is Life at the Alcazar Theatre in San Francisco on June 23, 1913. It was one of four plays by Leo Ditrichstein presented that month, the others being revivals of The Concert, Before and After, and Are You a Mason?. Ditrichstein produced and staged Such Is Life with the permission and financial backing of David Belasco, who owned the American rights to Pour Vivre Heureux. Ditrichstein used four performers of his own company for the play: Isabel Irving, Cora Witherspoon, Madge West, and Anne Livingston. The rest of the cast were members of the Alcazar Stock Company. It was reported that if the play was successful in its week-long presentation, that Belasco would produce it on Broadway during the Fall.

Local critics in San Francisco were enthusiastic about the play, though Neill Wilson of The San Francisco Examiner was prescient about a renaming: "There persists a feeling that Such Is Life, after it has been David Belascoed for its New York premiere, will face the theatrical season under a title made of sterner stuff". Wilson also credited Ditrichstein for providing most of the play over a French skeleton, and for the stage direction.

Following the San Francisco tryout, the production went on hiatus until August, when it started rehearsals at the Belasco Theatre, with many new cast members. A new character, Howard Locke, was written in for neophyte actor Julian Little, a recent Belasco discovery. The retitled and revised production then had another tryout at the Lyceum Theater in Rochester, New York, starting August 28, 1913. Though now The Temperamental Journey, the leading character played by Leo Ditrichstein was still named Stephen Blake. The play was generously received by the audience, while the local critic complimented Ditrichstein, Isabel Irving, Richie Ling, Josephine Victor, Cora Witherspoon, and Frank Conner for their performances.

=== Broadway premiere and reception ===
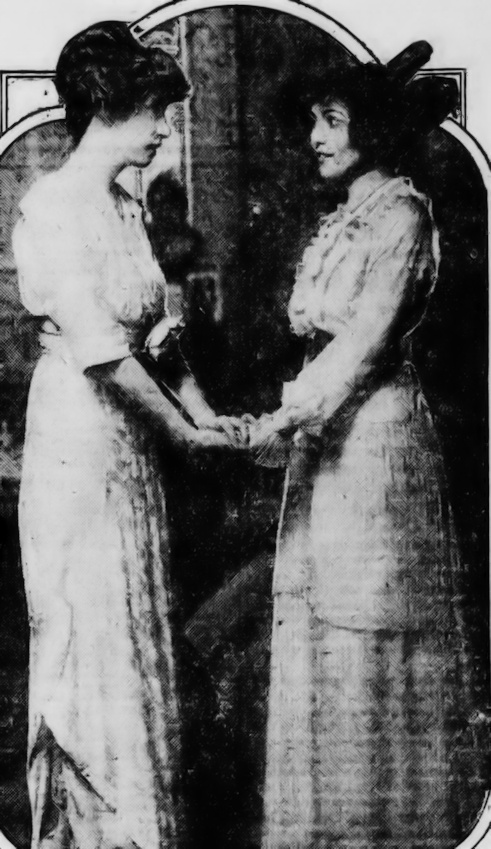

The Temperamental Journey had its Broadway premiere at the Belasco Theatre on September 4, 1913. By this time the main character had been renamed Jacques Dupont. (Note: The reason for the switch may have been complaints in tryout reviews that Leo Ditrichstein was having enunciation trouble. He was not a native English speaker; Willa Cather in a later article pointed out how his accent in The Concert was identical to that in The Temperamental Journey.) The judgement of The New York Times reviewer was that aside from the idea of an artist faking their death, there was little in common between Arnold Bennett's The Great Adventure and The Temperamental Journey. Matthew White Jr. in Munsey's Magazine said "...the surprise in The Temperamental Journey is not that it is so similar to The Great Adventure, but so different from it".

The reviewer for The Brooklyn Daily Eagle acknowledged the novelty of the main situation, but said the play "is thin, superficial and utterly unreal". What saves it as entertainment are "some charming incidental bits of character, comedy and sentiment". The New-York Tribune critic was positive about the play: "a thoroughly amusing comedy, ingenuously invented, well constructed, soundly and cleverly written, well acted and mounted". Charles Darnton in The Evening World was emphatic about The Temperamental Journey having little in common with The Great Adventure. He awarded the acting honors to Isabel Irving, but also mentioned Richie Ling "did the best acting of his life".

=== Change of venue and strike ===
The production moved from the Belasco Theatre to the Theatre Republic on September 29, 1913, to make way for David Warfield in a revival of The Auctioneer. Warfield was Belasco's discovery, and his first success had come in 1901 with The Auctioneer.

However, David Belasco created a labor issue by taking the stage hands from the Belasco Theatre, who were familiar with the setup for The Temperamental Journey, and switching them to the Republic, replacing them at the Belasco with the Republic stage hands. Though the distance was just four blocks, representatives of the Stage Hands Union insisted that by contract The Temperamental Journey was now a "road show", and must hire a new set of stage hands. Two union officials forced their way into the Republic and called out the stage hands. Belasco responded by pulling all the lobby and office personnel backstage, where he directed and joined them in shifting sets. The problem was quickly resolved the next day, and both productions were able to continue.

=== Broadway closing and abortive tour ===
The play reached its 100th performance on Monday night, December 1, 1913. It was still drawing crowds, but Belasco wanted to replace it with a silent film called Traffic in Souls. The Temperamental Journey closed at the Theatre Republic on Saturday, December 20, 1913, after 123 performances, and started its tour at the Broadway Theatre in Brooklyn the following Monday. However, within a week, Leo Ditrichstein fell ill, and the play was temporarily shutdown. As time passed, Ditrichstein's condition was found to be more serious than thought, leading Belasco to cancel the tour and close the production.
