= Cora Witherspoon =

American actress (1890–1957)

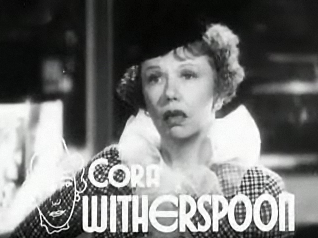
- As Gypsy in Dangerous Number (1937)
- Born: January 5, 1890; New Orleans, Louisiana, U.S.
- Died: November 17, 1957 (aged 67); Las Cruces, New Mexico, U.S.
- Resting place: Metairie Cemetery
- Occupation: Actress
- Years active: 1905–1954

Cora Witherspoon (January 5, 1890 – November 17, 1957) was an American stage and film character actress whose career spanned nearly half a century. She began in theatre where she remained rooted even after entering motion pictures in the early 1930s. As Witherspoon's career progressed, she carved a niche playing haughty society women or harridan housewives such as Princess Lina in Ferenc Molnár's 1928 play Olympia, or Agatha Sousè, W.C. Fields’ domineering spouse in the 1940 film The Bank Dick. John Springer and Jack Hamilton, authors of They Had Faces Then: Super Stars, Stars, and Starlets of the 1930s (1974), wrote that "Witherspoon was blessed with a face that might have been drawn by one of those cartoonists who specialize in dealing with the war between men and women."

== Early life ==
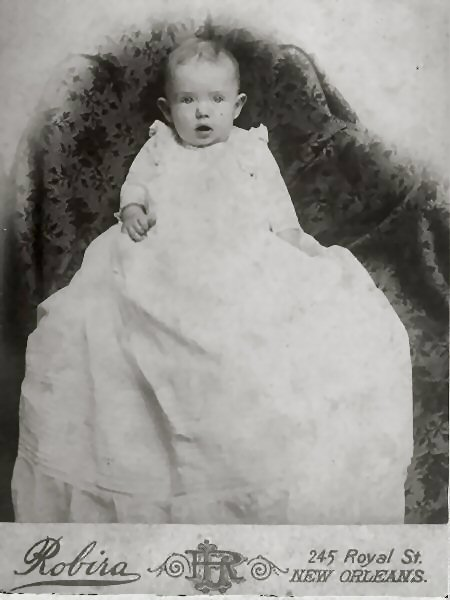
Cora Witherspoon baby picture

Witherspoon was born in New Orleans, to Cora S. Bell and Henry Edgeworth Witherspoon. Her father was an assistant surgeon with the Confederate Army during the American Civil War while her mother was an aunt of the civil rights advocate Judge John Minor Wisdom. Witherspoon was orphaned by age 10 and raised at least in part by her older sister, Maud, who, while still in her teens founded the Maud Witherspoon Rag Doll Manufacturing Company. Witherspoon's ancestors had reportedly once owned Ellington Plantation in St. Charles Parish, Louisiana.

== Stage ==
Witherspoon made her professional stage debut in 1905 with a New Orleans stock company. She first appeared in New York at the Belasco Theatre in the 1910 hit comedy The Concert, which was Leo Ditrichstein's adaptation of the stage play, in which the 20-year-old actress portrayed the 76-year-old Edith Gordon. Witherspoon appeared with Ditrichstein in September 1913 for a four-month run at the Belasco and briefly the Theatre Republic playing Fanny Lamont in The Temperamental Journey, from the comedy Pour Vivre Heureux by André Rivoire and Yves Mirandeis. From September 1914 into the following May at the Gaiety Theatre, she played Sally McBride in Jean Webster's comedy Daddy Long Legs.

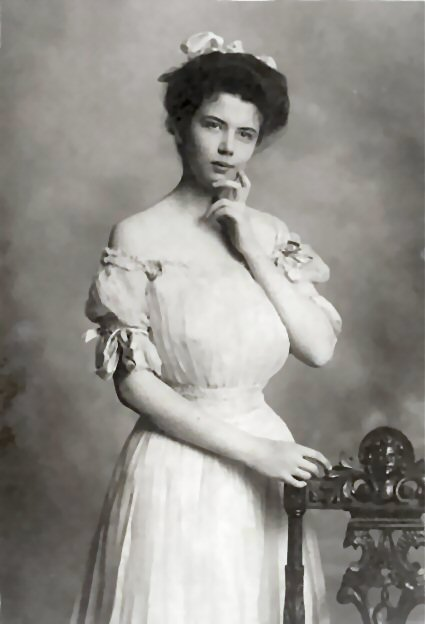
Cora Witherspoon c. 1910-1920

Witherspoon had a long run between November 1915 and June 1916 at the Longacre Theatre as Mrs. Van Ness in The Great Lover, another play by Ditrichstein, written in collaboration with Fanny and Frederic Hatton.

In 1926 Witherspoon was a member of the summer stock cast at Denver's Elitch Theatre, where she performed with Fredric March, Florence Eldridge, and Beulah Bondi.

She remained active on stage for another three decades often in long-running Broadway plays, such as:

- Miss Risdon in Three Faces East by Anthony Paul Kelly (1918/19)
- Gertrude Ainlee in Lilies of the Field by William J. Hurlbut (1921/22)
- Josephine Trent in The Awful Truth by Arthur Richman (1922/23)
- Marianne Regnault in Grounds for Divorce by Guy Bolton and Ernest Vajda (1924/25)
- Martha Culver in The Constant Wife by W. Somerset Maugham (1926/27)
- Mrs. Oliver in Philip Goes Forth by George Kelly (1931)
- Mrs. Paula La Salle in Forsaking All Others by Edward Roberts and Frank Cavett (1933)
- Mrs. Letty Walters in Jig Saw by Dawn Powell (1934)
- Isabel Cobb in A Touch of Brimstone by Frank Craven (1935)
- Mame Phillips in Ramshackle Inn by George Batson (1944)
- Mrs. Grant in The Front Page (revival) by Ben Hecht and Charles MacArthur (1946)

== Film ==
Her first film appearance was a small role in the 1931 motion picture Tarnished Lady starring Tallulah Bankhead. She played supporting roles in Hollywood films for nearly 25 years. Witherspoon played Mrs. Burns Norville in Libeled Lady with Jean Harlow and William Powell; Nesta Pett in Piccadilly Jim; Nora in Madame X; Patty in Quality Street; Countess de Noailles in Marie Antoinette; Carrie in Dark Victory; Mrs. Van Adams in The Women; Susie Watson in Charlie Chan's Murder Cruise; and Mrs. Williamson in The Mating Season. Her last film role was in It Should Happen to You (1954).

== Television and radio ==
Witherspoon appeared in several episodes of the classic American television series Fireside Theatre, Kraft Theatre and Studio One in Hollywood, and on radio in the NBC Great Plays series.

== Addiction ==
In his 1975 autobiography, Tennessee Williams: Memoirs, Williams told of his time in 1941 as a night shift elevator operator at the San Jacinto Hotel in Manhattan. Among the hotel's guests at the time was Witherspoon who, according to Williams, employed him or the hotel's telephone operator, a budding poet, to pick up her morphine prescription from an all-night pharmacy.

She used to rap with me and the poet till nearly day break in the San Jacinto lobby. Her “fix” would never wear itself out till first cock’s crow. Then the poet and I would sort of lift her into the lift, the poet would open her bedroom door and I would get her to the edge of her bed and let her drop on it. "What would I do without you boys?" she’d murmured with that sweet sad wisdom of the old who knows “all will pass.”

== Death ==
Witherspoon died in 1957, aged 67, at Las Cruces, New Mexico and interred at the Metairie Cemetery, New Orleans. She was survived by her sister Maud.
