= Roland Bottomley =

British-born American stage and film actor (1880–1947)

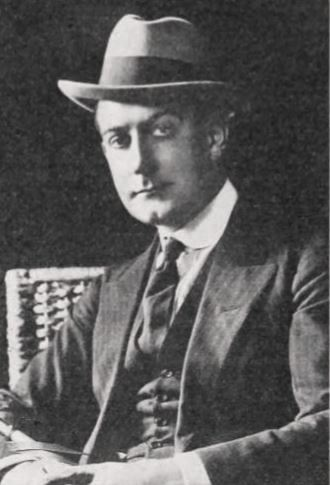
- Bottomley in A Man's Home (1921)
- Born: September 23, 1880; Liverpool, England
- Died: January 5, 1947 (aged 66); New York City, US
- Resting place: Kensico Cemetery, Valhalla, New York
- Occupation: actor
- Years active: 1913-1944

Roland Bottomley (1880-1947) was a British born American stage and film actor from Liverpool, England. Some sources have him born in 1878 and others in 1879. He moved to America circa 1913 and settled in California. He first made movies for the Kalem Company. By the 1920s he acted at Paramount, Fox, Universal and for Thomas H. Ince. In 1921 he portrayed Dr. Simpson in Augustus Thomas's Nemesis at the Garrick Theatre in Philadelphia and on Broadway at the Hudson Theatre. After his last film in 1925 he returned to Broadway for the remainder of his career. Bottomley died in New York at the beginning of 1947.

== Selected filmography ==
- The Green Cloak (1915)
- The Net of Deceit (1915)*short
- The Grip of Evil (1916)
- The Neglected Wife (1917)
- The Devil (1921)
- The Charming Deceiver (1921)
- A Man's Home (1921)
- Modern Marriage (1923)
- Does It Pay? (1923)
- The Dawn of a Tomorrow (1924)
- Enticement (1925
- Raffles, the Amateur Cracksman (1925)
