= Blanche Ring =

American actress (1871 – 1961)

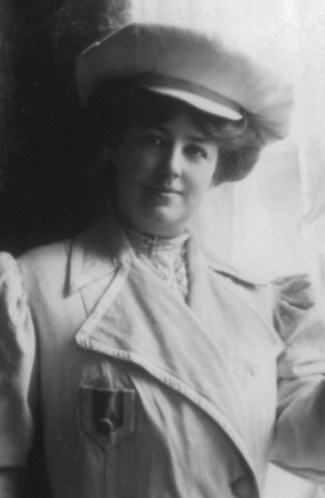
- Ring in the November of 1906
- Born: April 24, 1871; Boston, Massachusetts, U.S.
- Died: January 13, 1961 (aged 89); Santa Monica, California, U.S.
- Occupations: Actress; singer
- Years active: 1887–1945
- Spouse(s): Walter F. MacNichol; James Walker Jr. Edward Wentworth; Frederick E. MacKay; Charles Winninger
- Relatives: Cyril Ring (brother); A. Edward Sutherland (nephew)

Blanche Ring (April 24, 1871 – January 13, 1961) was an American singer and actress in Broadway theatre productions, musicals, and Hollywood motion pictures. She was best known for her rendition of "In the Good Old Summer Time."

== Early life and family ==
Ring was born in Boston, Massachusetts, to James H. Ring and Wilhelmena F. Ring. She came from show business stock. Her father was a comedian for 30 years and her grandfather James H. Ring, was a leading comedian of the Boston Museum company. Her great-great-grandfather, Charles Fisher, was also an actor and came to the United States from England. His wife was Josephine H. Shaw, an actress. He journeyed with theatrical caravans as far west as the Mississippi River. Her grandmother was Julie Fisher, a celebrated actress of her time. Her heritage was English-Irish-Scottish. In total, four generations of her ancestors were Shakespearean actors.

Blanche was one of six children (five daughters and one son) born to the Rings. Several of Blanche's siblings were in the entertainment business and quickly became recognizable names in the industry. In fact, they often performed together or on the same playbill. Two of the Ring sisters, Grace and Sarah, were not performers.

Blanche's sister, Julie Ring, became a stage actress. Julie married Albert H. Sutherland, a theatrical agent and former British actor. They had a son, A. Edward Sutherland, who became a film director in the United States. Albert H. Sutherland was a Theatrical and Vaudeville Agent in New York City. Julie's second marriage was to actor James Norval on November 9, 1914. They frequently appeared on stage together. She died in 1957.

Her sister, Frances Ring, was married in 1909 to Thomas Meighan, the popular stage and later silent film actor.

The Ring sisters' younger brother, Cyril, was a freelance actor. He was the first husband of actress Charlotte Greenwood. He later married Ziegfeld Follies girl Molly Green in 1923; they had two daughters.

== Theater ==
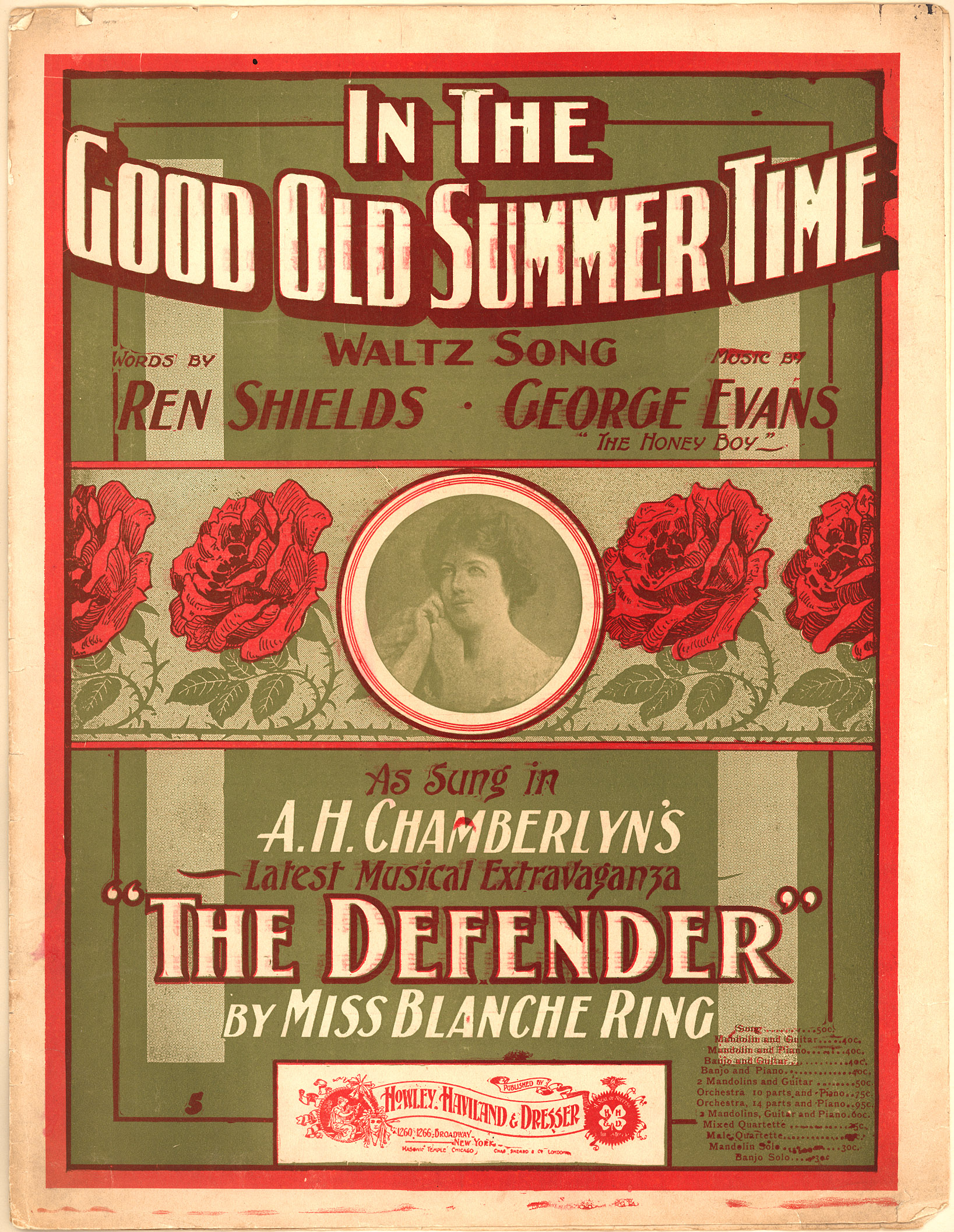
In The Good Old Summer Time - Cover - Blanche Ring

=== Musicals ===
Miss Ring made her debut at age 16 in A Parisian Romance in 1887 with Shakespearean actor Richard Mansfield's theatrical company. Later she acted with Nat Goodwin and Chauncey Olcott. In 1902 she made her Broadway debut as Millie Canvass in Charles Dennée's musical The Defender. In this show she introduced to the public the new song "In the Good Old Summer Time"; a work which became a popular standard in the American song canon. She followed this with another hit song "The Belle of Avenue A", performed in Tommy Rot, which was staged at Mrs. Osborn's Playhouse in New York City. In 1903 she had a hit song, "Bedelia", which she performed in the musical The Jersey Lily; a song whose sheet music sold more than three million copies. Ring left the US for a tour of Europe including London, returning to America in 1904 where she became even more established as a favorite performer appearing at three notable venues belonging to vaudeville impresario F.F. Proctor including Proctor's Twenty-third Street Theater, Newark Theater and Fifth Avenue Theater.

"I've Got Rings On My Fingers" was introduced when Blanche performed in The Midnight Sons in 1909. Her recording of the song for Victor Records is listed as one of Billboard's top hits of that year, along with her recordings of "Yip-I-Addy-I-Aye" and "The Billiken Man."

In 1910, she recorded "Come Josephine in My Flying Machine" after introducing it in a Broadway show, and the song became one of her biggest hits. She portrayed the title role in the 1914 Broadway musical When Claudia Smiles.

In April of 1912, Ring starred in The Wall Street Girl, which debuted Will Rogers in his first musical. During the first performance, Rogers interrupted the action on stage to announce the sinking of the Titanic to the audience. The show resumed and otherwise had a successful New York run.

Among her other songs of note are "Bedelia" and "I'd Leave My Happy Home for You". The former was featured in The Jersey Lilly. During World War I, the singer was popular with "They're All Out of Step But Jim".

Blanche Ring possessed a talent for mime. This helped her advance in musical revues and she was billed as "America's Favorite Singing Comedienne" as of 1918. Her impersonations were paired with those of Charles Winninger in the Passing Show of 1919, performed at the Winter Garden Theatre in New York City.

==== 1930s ====
Ring appeared as Mrs. Grace Draper in Strike Up the Band (1930) and she played Josie Huggins in Right This Way (1938).

=== Dramas ===
On the dramatic stage she appeared in Cradle Snatchers and as Mrs. Hawthorne in The Great Necker (1928).

Her final stage performance was in her role as Rose Bertin in Madame Capet (1938); the production starred Eva Le Gallienne.

== Film ==
Ring went to Hollywood in 1916 to star in the silent film The Yankee Girl. She has a brief role in Dr. Jekyll and Mr. Hyde. She acted in the motion picture It's the Old Army Game (directed by her nephew Eddie Sutherland) with W.C. Fields in 1926.

In 1940, Ring appeared as one of the featured vaudeville greats in the Bing Crosby picture, If I Had My Way (1940).

== Personal life ==
=== Marriages ===
The singer's personal life was tumultuous and not without scandal. In all, Blanche Ring was married five times and by her own admission she separated from several of her husbands for various reasons. All of Ring's marriages ended in divorce.

- Walter F. MacNichol - Ring had one son, Gordon Eliot MacNichol, by her first marriage to MacNichol, a theatrical manager.
- James Walker Jr. - Ring separated from Walker in 1898 and the couple divorced in 1904. Walker was from Somerville, Massachusetts and worked for the railroad.
- Edward Wentworth
- Frederick Edward McKay, her theatrical manager
- Charles Winninger - Ring first met Winninger a fellow actor in 1908 and they later appeared in "Broadway Whirl" together. The couple married in 1912 when Ring was 41. The couple separated in 1928; Winninger and Ring were not formally divorced until 1951.

In the summer, Ring gravitated to nearby Westchester County for golf and the beaches. She liked to entertain fellow thespians and was known for throwing house parties attended by the likes of Douglas Fairbanks and Eddie Foy Sr. At one time, Ring shared a home in Rye, New York with Winninger at 30 Oakland Beach Avenue where she remained until at least 1935. Previous to living in Rye, Ring had a country home in Mamaroneck across from the actress Ethel Barrymore and another in Larchmont at 28 Oak Avenue.

Ring left New York in 1959 to live in Hollywood with her brother, Cyril.

In May 1960 she attended a reunion of former Ziegfeld Follies girls. Blanche Ring was an honorary member of the Ziegfeld Club, though she never worked for Flo Ziegfeld.

=== Legacy ===
Ring died in a nursing home in Santa Monica, California in 1961, aged 89. She had been in poor health for two years following a stroke in 1958. Her interment was in Holy Cross Cemetery, following a rosary which was recited in the Church of the Good Shepherd, in Beverly Hills, California.

Blanche's nieces and nephews followed the family's tradition for careers in theater and music. Her great-niece is conductor Jane Ring Frank.

== Note ==
In the film Somewhere in Time (1980), Christopher Reeve plays a journalist who researches a fictional Edwardian actress in a hotel's library, and finds some theatrical photos. Reeve pulls out a photo of three little girls together. The girls are Blanche Ring and her sisters Julie and Frances. The same photo appears under Blanche Ring's biography in Daniel Blum's book Great Stars of the American Stage (1954).
