= The Road to Rome =

1926 play by Robert E. Sherwood

- Original language: English
- Written by: Robert Sherwood
- Music by: Douglas Moore
- Subject: Hannibal's seduction
- Genre: Satire
- Setting: The house of Fabius Maximus, and the camp of Hannibal.

Premiere
- Date: January 31, 1927
- Place: Playhouse Theatre
- Directed by: Lester Lonergan

The Road to Rome is a 1926 historical satire by author Robert Sherwood. It has three acts, two settings, and a large cast. The action of the play covers a single evening and the next morning in June 216 B.C., during the Second Punic War. The plot revolves around a Greco-Roman lady who distracts and dissuades Hannibal from capturing Rome after the Battle of Cannae. It was Sherwood's first published play.

The play was first produced by William A. Brady, Jr. and Dwight Wiman, with staging by Lester Lonergan, settings and costumes by Lee Simonson, musical effects by Douglas Moore, and starring Jane Cowl, with Philip Merivale and Richie Ling. It had tryouts at Washington, D.C. and Newark, New Jersey, before its Broadway premiere, all during January 1927. It ran for 396 performances, ending just ten days short of a year.

After a four month tour, the play was revived for another month on Broadway. It also had a separate production company in London starting in May 1928, and was adapted for a 1930 production in Australia by Edith Taliaferro, and a 1955 musical film.

== Characters ==
Characters are listed in order of appearance within their scope. Only principal characters are listed, many featured and all bit players are omitted. None of the characters should be regarded as serious historical depictions. They converse using modern (1920s) forms of expression, which Sherwood defends as not being influenced by George Bernard Shaw.

Lead

- Fabius Maximus is a pompous middle-aged man, the newly acclaimed dictator of Rome. (Note: Sherwood proposed this dating for Fabius' second and last term as dictator.)
- Amytis is from Athens, the childless young wife of Fabius Maximus, bored and restless, but with hidden depths. (Note: Sherwood invented this unlikely wife for Fabius Maximus.)
- Hannibal is a pensive, clean-shaven, two-eyed take on the historical figure. (Note: Polybius says Hannibal had lost an eye shortly after crossing the Alps.)

Supporting

- Varius is a young slave from Sicily in the house of Fabius, who longs to escape.
- Meta is also a slave, captured along with Varius; she serves Amytis as maid.
- Fabia is 73, mother to Fabius, vigorous, rigid, old-fashioned, and ruler of the household.
- Scipio is a young Roman soldier, brave and unyielding.
- Sergeant is a Carthaginian NCO, in charge of Hannibal's security.
- Hasdrubal is commander of Hannibal's cavalry, and not a member of the Barca family.
- Mago Barca is Hannibal's comic relief youngest brother, in charge of the elephants. (Note: Another historical liberty, as there were not thought to be any elephants left in Hannibal's army by this time)

Featured

- Drusus is an old Roman senator.
- Sertorius is another old Roman senator.
- Corporal is a Carthaginian NCO, subordinate to the Sergeant.
- Thothmes is an Egyptian scribe accompanying Hannibal's army and recording its deeds.
- Maharbal is a Carthaginian commander.
- Carthalo is a Carthaginian infantry commander.

== Synopsis ==
Act I (Courtyard of Fabius Maximus' house, an evening in June 216 B.C.) Varius and Meta discuss escape from slavery, but are scolded by Fabia for idleness. Fabius arrives home discouraged, having been elected dictator in difficult circumstances. Amytis arrives home from the market with a scandalous Phoenician gown, hoping to arouse Fabius' passion. But he is preoccupied with Hannibal, of whom Amytis is unaware. Fabia and Fabius are discomfited, by the gown and its cost, and her ignorance of Rome's mortal enemy. Soon distant campfires are spotted outside the walls of Rome. At first these are assumed to be a Roman army, but battle-stained Scipio arrives with news of Cannae and Hannibal's imminent arrival. While Fabius sends for Drusus, Sertorius and other senators, Scipio speaks of Hannibal's genius and skill, and proclaims him a god of battle. This arouses Amytis' interest. Fabius, Scipio, and the senators discuss the hopeless situation; they are nonplussed by the suggestion of negotiations made by Amytis. When Amytis decides to go to her mother in Ostia, taking Varius and Meta, Fabia excortiates her for a traitor and coward. Amytis shrugs off the criticism and departs with the two slaves. (Curtain)

Act II (Hannibal's camp in a captured temple a mile east of Rome, an hour later.) The Sergeant has the Corporal arrange Hannibal's guards around his headquarters in a captured temple. The men discuss their preference for guard duty over being posted to the elephants. Hasdrubal orders them to do something useful, and they soon capture Amytis, Varius, and Meta. Pronounced spies by Hasdrubal, who orders the Sergeant to have them killed, they win a reprieve when Mago starts fondling Amytis, who is still wearing the scandalous gown. The incensed Amytis is relieved of Mago's attentions by the arrival of Hannibal. However, he too condemns the prisoners, only to be caught up in the net of Amytis' words and the spell of her beauty. She says she deliberately took the wrong road out of Rome in order to see the man Scipio praised as "god-like". Hannibal dismisses Hasdrubal and Mago, and at Amytis' insistence, orders the guards to protect Varius and Meta from harm while in camp. That order is soon tested when a Carthaginian soldier attempts to grab Meta and is knocked down by Varius. Alone in the temple, Amytis plies Hannibal with questions about his motives for a life spent in hatred, battle, and vengeance. She gradually seduces him, the scene ending with their embrace. (Curtain)

Act III (Same as Act II, the next morning.) Hasdrubal, Mago, Maharbal, and Carthalo discuss who shall have the honor of leading the assault on Rome. Hannibal tries to mediate their dispute, but the conference is interrupted by the approach of Fabius, Scipio, and the senators, under a flag of truce. The Roman party tries a bluff, saying they have twenty legions in the city, but Amytis surreptitiously tells Hannibal it isn't true. She is concerned about being seen by Fabius, not wishing to disgrace him in public. Hannibal invents a story to explain her presence. He has fallen in with her pacifistic attitude and has decided to spare Rome for the moment. He calls over Thothmes, and tears up the scribe's records of the Carthaginian Army's victories. He allows Varius and Meta to accompany his army to Capua on their way home to Sicily. Placing Amytis under her husband's care, he dismisses the Roman delegation, telling Fabius to treasure such a wife and any heirs she may soon produce. (Curtain)

== Original production ==
=== Background ===
Historical satire, as opposed to costume drama, enjoyed a vogue in early 20th Century theatre, with works such as Caesar and Cleopatra by George Bernard Shaw and Madame Sand by Philip Moeller. Robert E. Sherwood was well aware of the actual events as recorded by ancient authors and interpreted by modern historians, which he recounts in a lengthy preface to his published play. In this preface, he says the inspiration for the work came of an early admiration for Hannibal, and curiosity as to his motive for turning aside from Rome after the Battle of Cannae.

When he wrote The Road to Rome, Sherwood was a film critic and editor for Life magazine. This was his first published play. William A. Brady, Jr. and Dwight Wiman accepted it for immediate production in December 1926. At the time they were a young partnership with little reputation except for cheap melodramas. They had offices in the Playhouse Theatre, which was owned by Brady's father, William A. Brady.

From November 1926 speculation had The Road to Rome as a role for Jane Cowl. By the end of December 1926, Lester Lonergan had been hired as director, and Philip Merivale cast as Cowl's co-star.

=== Cast ===
Principal cast only during the tryouts and the Broadway run.
| Role | Actor | Dates | Notes and sources |
|---|---|---|---|
| Fabius Maximus | Richie Ling | Jan 17, 1927 - Jan 07, 1928 | The London-born Ling had the distinction of being the first actor to heed Equity's 1919 strike call. |
| Amytis | Jane Cowl | Jan 17, 1927 - Jan 07, 1928 | Cowl did not miss a single performance of this run nor of the four-month tour which followed. |
| Hannibal | Philip Merivale | Jan 17, 1927 - Aug 31, 1927 | After 242 performances, Merivale left for the only male role in William J. Hurlbut's Hidden. |
| Hannibal | Pedro de Cordoba | Sep 01, 1927 - Jan 07, 1928 | |
| Varius | Fairfax Burghar | Jan 17, 1927 - Jan 07, 1928 | The youngest principal actor, Burghar was a veteran of the United States Army Air Service. |
| Meta | Joyce Carey | Jan 17, 1927 - Jan 07, 1928 | |
| Fabia | Jessie Ralph | Jan 17, 1927 - Jan 07, 1928 | |
| Scipio | Charles Brokaw | Jan 17, 1927 - Jan 07, 1928 | |
| Sergeant | Jock McGraw | Jan 17, 1927 - Jan 07, 1928 | |
| Hasdrubal | Louis Hector | Jan 17, 1927 - Jan 07, 1928 | |
| Mago | Barry Jones | Jan 17, 1927 - Jan 07, 1928 | |
| Drusus | William R. Randall | Jan 17, 1927 - Jan 07, 1928 | |
| Sertorius/Thothmes | Lionel Hogarth | Jan 17, 1927 - Jan 07, 1928 | |
| Corporal | Lewis Martin | Jan 17, 1927 - Jan 07, 1928 | |
| Maharbal | Alfred Webster | Jan 17, 1927 - Jan 07, 1928 | |
| Carthalo | Harold Moffet | Jan 17, 1927 - Jan 07, 1928 | |

=== Tryouts ===
The Road to Rome opened at the Schubert Belasco Theatre in Washington, D.C. on January 17, 1927. Leonard Hall said the play started fifteen minutes late but still ended at a "decent hour". He gave acting honors to Philip Merivale as the "war-weary" Hannibal, and said the play was "an excellently written piece of goods". Philander Johnson said it was "a thoroughly original work, irresistable in its fun, convincing in its sentiment" and judged it comparable with the best of George Bernard Shaw. Lee Somers said the play was "clever satire even when it appears broadest burlesque".

Two days after the opening, costume and setting designer Lee Simonson surprised members of The Road to Rome production by marrying Carolyn Hancock Bergman at a Washington court on January 19, 1927, and immediately leaving for New York. The production then moved to the Broad Street Theatre in Newark, New Jersey on January 24, 1927.

=== Broadway premiere and reception ===
The play had its Broadway premiere on January 31, 1927, at the Playhouse Theatre. Jane Cowl had top billing, with no other performers listed in newspaper ads. However, Arthur Pollock in The Brooklyn Daily Eagle gave Philip Merivale the acting honors, in part because he felt Hannibal was the only character who really interested Sherwood. Pollock thought Jane Cowl's Amytis exhibited "calculated cuteness" in the first act, was a "Newark ingenue" and not a "New York actress" until her character met Merivale's Hannibal. Overall, he judged the work was "acted well enough to make it seem a better play than it is".

Burns Mantle said that Jane Cowl played "with alluring persuasiveness" while Philip Merivale was perfect as "a tired and susceptible warrior come to a questioning of his philosophies as a conqueror", while the play itself was "swamped with all the outward evidences of a popular success". Rowland Field thought The Road to Rome was "great fun" and "merrily amusing" for two and a half acts, but it faltered at the end of the third act when it became serious. His opinion was opposite to Brooks Atkinson, who thought the play showed "a wearisomely professional sense of humor" until the last act when it "gets down to romance and human values worth while".

Scribner's published the play on April 23, 1927, while the Broadway production was in its third month. On April 26, 1927, the 100th performance of The Road to Rome was given at the Playhouse Theatre, all of them being to capacity audiences, setting a box office record for that venue. For the Decoration Day holiday, veterans of the Canadian Black Watch who had served with Sherwood in the Great War were given matinee tickets.

The production reached its 200th performance on July 20, 1927. In early September 1927, the entire cast attended the funeral of stage manager Robert McGroarty, who was killed when the body of a homicide victim fell nine stories onto him while walking on 44th Street in Manhattan. A second company was launched at Detroit's Garrick Theatre on October 3, 1927, with Grace George (Note: The mother of producer William A. Brady, Jr.) as Amytis, Morris McKay as Hannibal, and J. M. Kerrigan as Fabius. The first company reached its 300th Broadway performance on October 17, 1927.

=== Broadway closing ===
The Road to Rome closed at the Playhouse on January 7, 1928, after 396 performances. (Note: The New York Daily News ran a recurring feature called "The Golden Dozen" which tracked the longest running plays still active on Broadway. The counts published on any one day did not include performances to be done later that day. Its figures for the last week of The Road to Rome show 387 on Sunday, January 1, 1928, which is consistent with a previously reported total of 385 for Saturday, December 31, 1927. However, it showed 385 on Monday, January 2, then 391 on Friday, January 6, and 392 on January 7, 1928. During this last week the production gave its usual eight performances (six evening and two matinee shows), plus an extra matinee on January 2, 1928. The actual count then is at least 396.) After a four month tour, the production was revived at the same theater, running from May 21, 1928, with Sir Guy Standing in the role of Hannibal, until June 16, 1928.

Producers Brady and Wiman launched a second production company at the Strand Theatre in the West End, on May 16, 1928. Isabel Jeans and Philip Merivale starred as Amytis and Hannibal. The Guardian reviewer said "The Road to Rome is the most intelligent entertainment that has come into London for some time".

== Adaptations ==
=== Stage ===
- The Road to Romance - A 1930 adaptation by the Edith Taliaferro company, played in Melbourne, Australia.

=== Film ===
- Jupiter's Darling (1955) - Metro-Goldwyn-Mayer acquired the film rights in 1933, as a potential starring vehicle for Clark Gable. In 1955, the play was adapted for the screen as a widescreen musical starring Esther Williams and Howard Keel.

== Bibliography ==
- Robert Emmet Sherwood. The Road to Rome. Charles Scribner's Sons, New York, 1927.
