= The Neglected Wife =

1917 film

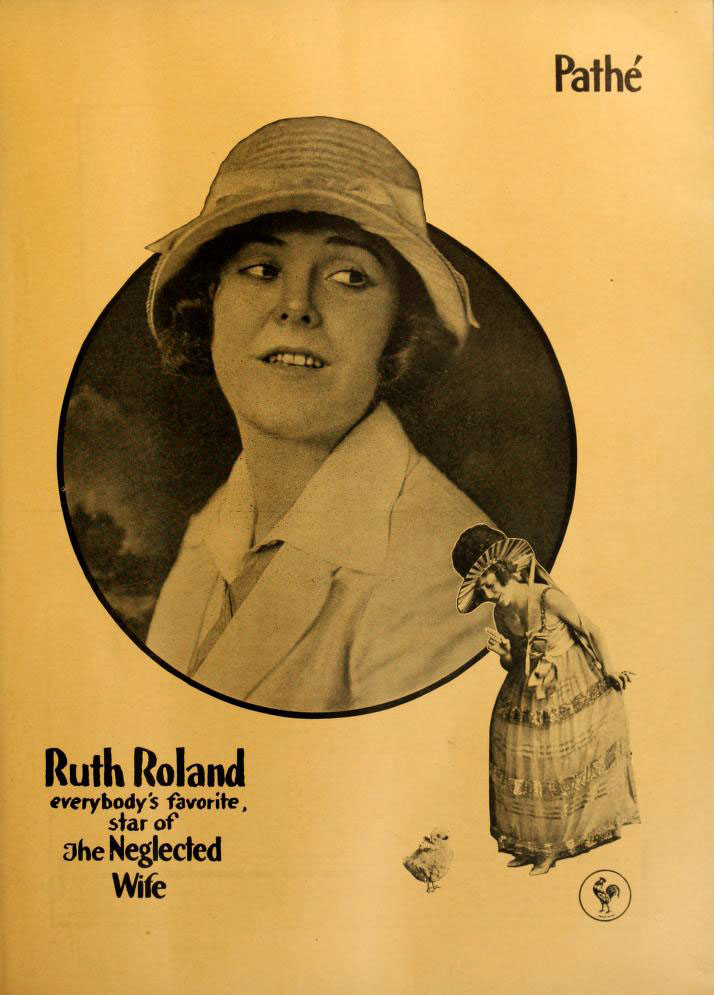
- Film poster
- Directed by: William Bertram
- Written by: Joseph Dunn; Will M. Ritchey
- Based on: The Journal of a Neglected Wife; The Woman Alone by: Mabel Herbert Urner
- Starring: Ruth Roland; Roland Bottomley
- Production company: Balboa Amusement Producing Company
- Distributed by: Pathé Exchange
- Release date: May 13, 1917
- Running time: 15 episodes
- Country: United States
- Language: Silent with English intertitles

The Neglected Wife is a 1917 American drama film serial directed by William Bertram.

== Cast ==
- Ruth Roland as Margaret Warner
- Roland Bottomley as Horace Kennedy
- Corinne Grant as Mary Kennedy
- Neil Hardin as Edgar Doyle (as Neil C. Hardin)
- Philo McCullough as Frank Norwood
- Mollie McConnell

== Episodes ==
The serial consisted of fifteen two reel episodes, released from May 13 to August 5, 1917:

1. The Woman Alone
2. Weakening
3. In the Crucible
4. Beyond Recall
5. Under Suspicion
6. On the Precipice
7. The Message on the Mirror
8. A Relentless Fate
9. Deepening Degradation
10. A Veiled Intrigue
11. A Reckless Indiscretion
12. Embittered Love
13. Revolting Pride
14. Desperation
15. A Sacrifice Supreme

== Reception ==
Like many American films of the time, The Neglected Wife was subject to cuts by city and state film censorship boards. For example, the Chicago Board of Censors required these cuts in these three episodes: Episode 11, throwing brick down on man, stealing key from rack, stealing letters, and throwing man into burning house; Episode 12, the intertitle "Or I will have you ejected by complaining that you are what you are -"; and Episode 13, thugs shooting from boat, two holdup scenes, attack on girl and gagging, shooting from window, and the intertitles "We must get the girl - to go back to him", "You have ruined Margaret Warner and the Veiled Woman", and "You will return to Kennedy or -".

== See also ==
- List of film serials
- List of film serials by studio
