= The Green Cloak =

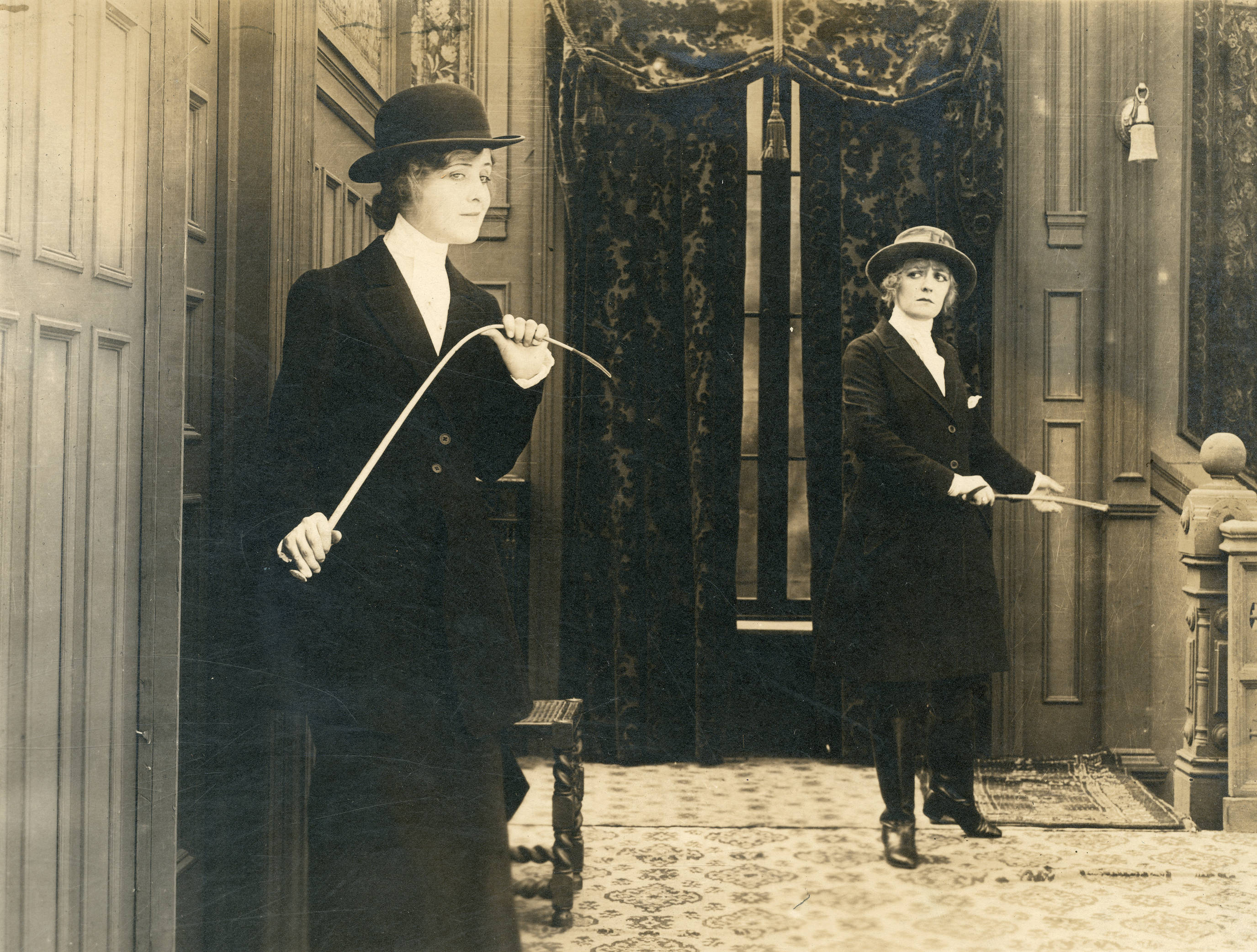
- Still with Irene Fenwick
- Directed by: Walter Edwin
- Written by: Owen Davis(scenario); Henry Kitchell Webster(scenario)
- Produced by: George Kleine Productions
- Starring: Irene Fenwick
- Distributed by: Kleine-Edison Feature Services
- Release date: October 20, 1915
- Running time: 5 reels
- Country: United States
- Language: Silent (English intertitles)

The Green Cloak is a surviving 1915 American silent mystery film directed by Walter Edwin and starring Broadway stage actress Irene Fenwick.

An extant film, a print is held by the George Eastman Museum.

== Cast ==
- Irene Fenwick as Ruth McAllister
- Blanche Aimee as Kate McAllister
- Della Connor as Ella Lenox
- Kathryn Brook as Mrs. Lenox
- Anna Reader as Jane
- Roland Bottomley as John Gilbert
- John Davidson as Paul Duncan
- Frank Belcher as Sgt. Sims
- Richie Ling as Wilkins the butler
- William Anker as The Professor
