= Come On In (film) =

Come on In
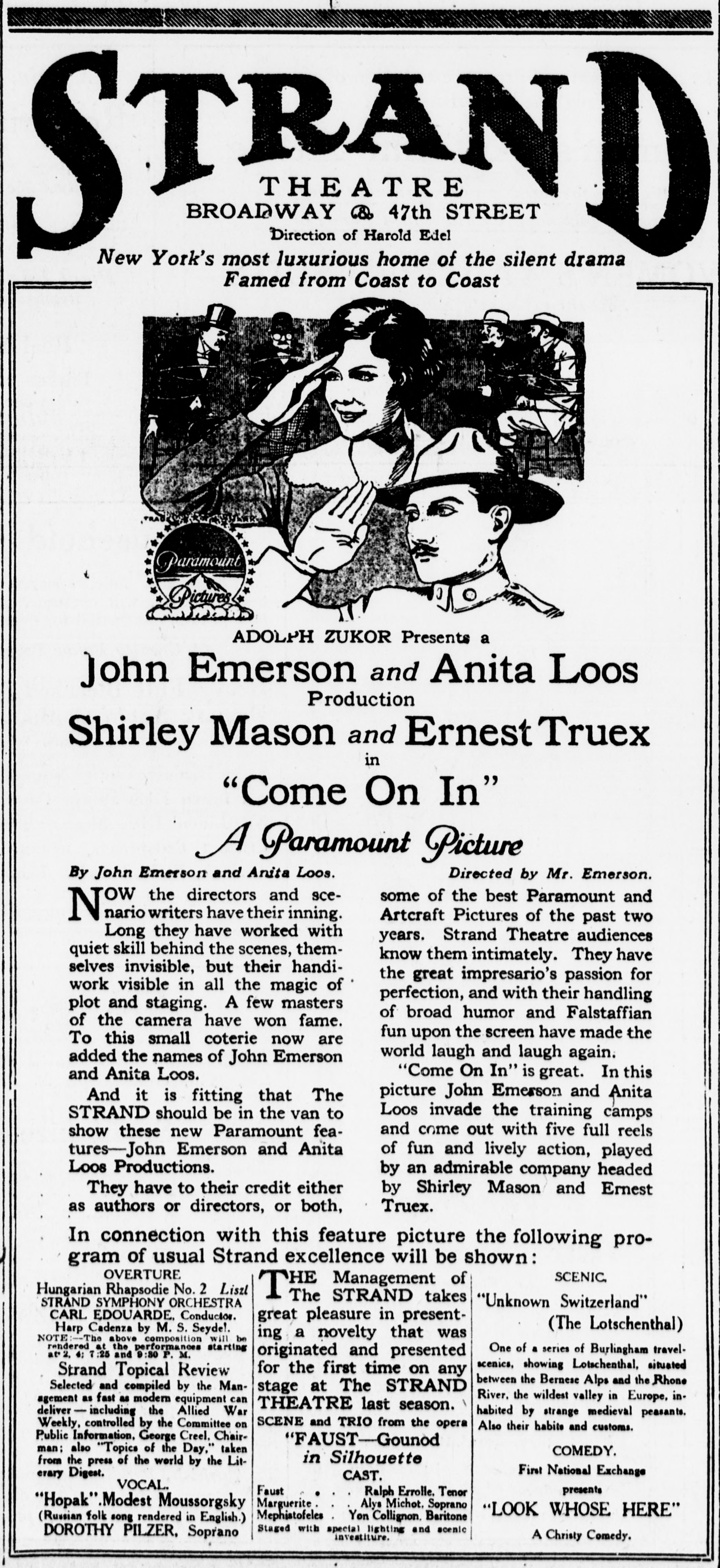
- Newspaper advertisement
- Directed by: John Emerson
- Written by: John Emerson; Anita Loos
- Produced by: Adolph Zukor; John Emerson; Anita Loos
- Starring: Shirley Mason; Ernest Truex; Carl De Planta; Joseph Burke; Renault Tourneur; Bernard Randall
- Cinematography: Jacques Montéran - (French Wikipedia)
- Production companies: John Emerson & Anita Loos Productions; Famous Players–Lasky Corporation
- Distributed by: Paramount Pictures
- Release date: September 22, 1918
- Running time: 50 minutes
- Country: United States
- Language: Silent (English intertitles)

Come on In is a 1918 American comedy silent film directed by John Emerson and written by John Emerson and Anita Loos. The film stars Shirley Mason, Ernest Truex, Carl De Planta, Joseph Burke, Renault Tourneur, and Bernard Randall. The film was released on September 22, 1918, by Paramount Pictures. It is not known whether the film currently survives.

== Plot ==
As described in a film magazine, after war is declared on Germany Ernest Short enlists, and his best girl Emmy Little determines to do her bit by running down a German spy. She falls in love with a German-American and, when he gets orders to kill an American officer, he proposes and they are married. Emmy's uncle, an army officer, is invited to the wedding. The plotters overcome the officer after the wedding and attempt to kill him. Ernest rescues the officer, trails the wedding party, and has the German placed under arrest. He and Emmy later marry.

== Cast ==
- Shirley Mason as Emmy Little
- Ernest Truex as Ernest Short
- Carl De Planta as Count von Bumstuff
- Joseph Burke as Professor G. Wottan Orphul-Schmell
- Renault Tourneur as A. Schlobb
- Bernard Randall as Otto B. Schott
- Blanche Craig as Mrs. schroeder
- Meyer Berenson as Office Boy
- Richie Ling as The Colonel
- Louis Hendricks as German Spy
