= The Defender (musical) =

1902 musical

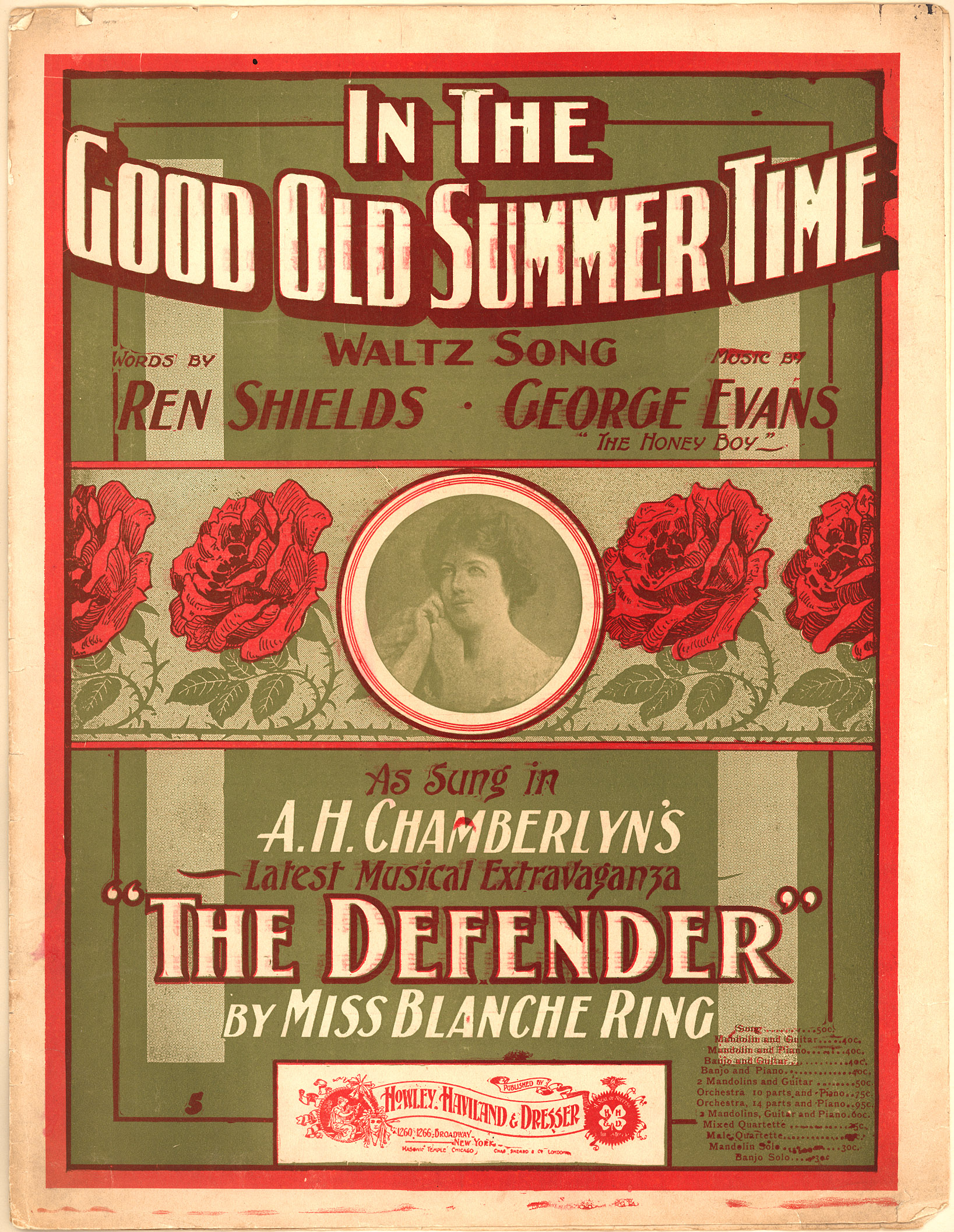
Sheet music for "In the Good Old Summer Time"

The Defender is a musical in three acts with music by Charles Dennée and both book and lyrics by Allen Lowe. It is best remembered for introducing the popular standard "In the Good Old Summer Time"; a song which was performed in the production by Blanche Ring (in the role of Millie Canvass) who made her Broadway debut in this show. Set in Newport, Rhode Island and on the yacht "Hibernia" while at sea, the musical's story focused on the rivalry between an American yachtsman and English yachtsman who are both attempting to win an international yachting competition. Its plot was loosely based on the life of American businessman and yachtsman Thomas W. Lawson.

After an initial production in Boston, The Defender premiered on Broadway at the Herald Square Theatre on July 3, 1902. It ran there for a total of sixty performances; closing on August 23, 1902. The production was produced by A.H. Chamberlyn and was directed by Frank Smithson. In addition to Blanche Ring, the cast included Harry Davenport as Sir Thomas Ceylon Teaton, George Alison as Mr. Tom Pinkson, Emma Carus as Mrs. Jack Orchard, Richie Ling as Charles Dare, Mayme Kelso as Mrs. Everly Chase, Alexander Clark as Sam Keno, Paula Edwardes as Jellie Canvass, Charles Wayne as Pinkie Winkerton, Gilbert Clayton as Mr. Ivory D. Queers, Gordon Tomkins as Han Kuff, Sandol Milliken as Miss Hilda Shipton, and Edith Eldridge as Winsome.
