= The Yankee Girl =

1915 film by Jack J. Clark

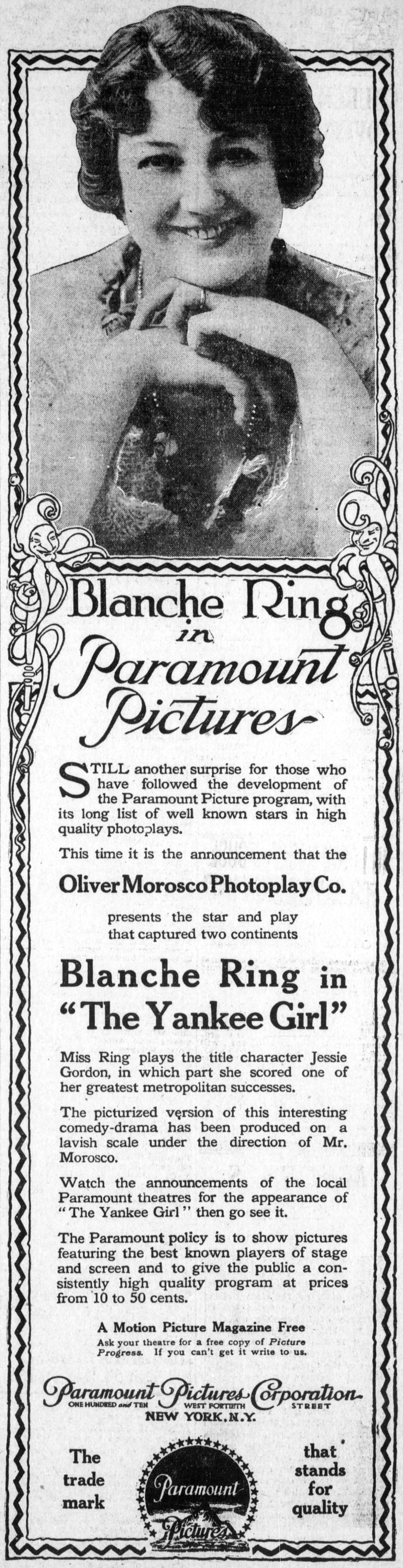
- Newspaper advertisement for the film.
- Directed by: Jack J. Clark
- Written by: George V. Hobart (play); Elliott J. Clawson (scenario for the film)
- Produced by: Oliver Morosco
- Starring: Blanche Ring
- Cinematography: Dal Clawson
- Music by: George W. Beynon (per IMDb)
- Distributed by: Paramount Pictures
- Release date: October 25, 1915
- Running time: 50 minutes; 5 reels
- Country: United States
- Language: Silent (English intertitles)

The Yankee Girl is a 1915 American silent comedy drama film produced by Oliver Morosco, distributed by Paramount Pictures and starring Blanche Ring, from the Broadway stage. This film though a comedy is actually based on Ring's 1910 musical-comedy play of the same name. Being a silent film, Ring's singing could not be heard by the film audiences, but they would get the rare chance of seeing this Broadway star in a film, as many could not afford to make the journey to New York to see her in person in the play.

This film was shot in Pasadena, California.

It is preserved in the Library of Congress and at the UCLA Film & Television Archive.

== Cast ==
- Blanche Ring – Jessie Gordon
- Forrest Stanley – Jack Lawrence
- Herbert Standing – President Ambroce Castroba
- Howard Davies – James Seavey
- Harry Fisher Jr. – Willie Fitzmaurice
- Robert Dunbar – Philip Gordon
- Joe Ray – Ramon Morales
- Bonita Darling – Winnie Gordon
- Lydia Yeamans Titus – Jessie's Aunt
- Syd De Gray – Wiggs
