= Charles Dennée =

American composer

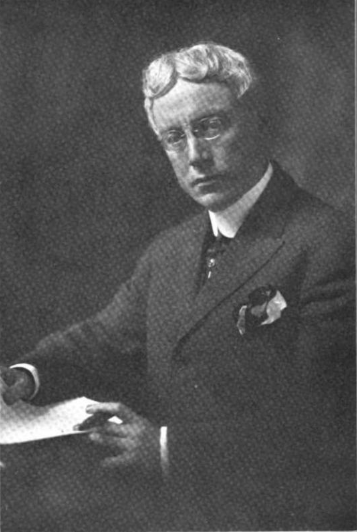
- Born: Charles Frederick Dennée; 1863; Oswego, New York
- Died: April 29, 1946 (aged 82); Brookline, Massachusetts
- Education: New England Conservatory of Music
- Occupations: Composer, Songwriter, Concert Pianist, Piano Instructor

Charles Frederick Dennée (1863 – April 29, 1946) was an American composer. He wrote many pedagogical pieces for piano and composed a number of songs. He wrote the scores for two Broadway musicals. He compiled a series of four books for piano study, published under the International Library of Music during his time as a piano professor at the New England Conservatory of Music. The four published collections include his original pieces for technical piano study, small etude studies, explanatory text by Dennée, and a selection of well-known classical composers.

== Biography ==
Charles Dennée was born in Oswego, New York, in 1863. He was educated at the New England Conservatory of Music.

He became a concert pianist, giving over 1,000 performances in the 1880s and 1890s. With fellow composers and songwriters Edward E. Rice, Fred J. Eustis, and T. W. Connor he wrote the music for the 1900 Broadway musical Little Red Riding Hood. Alone, he later composed the music to the 1902 Broadway musical The Defender.

He died at his home in Brookline, Massachusetts, on April 29, 1946.

== Compositions ==
- Suite Moderne Op.8 (1885) 1.Prelude 2.Novelette 3.Danse Orientale 4.Romanza 5.Etude Characteristique
- Danse Moderne Op.9 No.1
- 3 Morceaux Op.10 (1885) 1.Serenade 2.Gavotte 3.Album Leaf
- Rondo Villageois Op.12 No.3
- Albumleaves Op.15 (1888)
- Suite de Ballet Op.23 (1894) 1.? 2.? 3.? 4.Tarantelle in A minor 5.Danse Humoristique
- 5 Etudes Op.26 (1896) 1.Toccata 2.Le Papillon 3.Impromptu 4.Caprice 5.Tarantelle (Etude d'octaves)
- Mountain Scenes Op.30 (1902) 1.In the Canon 2.Arbutus 3.Sprites of the Glen 4.The Placid Lake 5.Forest Sounds 6.The Rainbow 7.A Burro Ride 8.Dance of the Gnomes 9.Around the Campfire
- 3 Compositions Op.31 (1905) 1.Hide and Seek 2.Marche Mignonne 3.Elfin Revelry
- 3 Morceaux Caracteristiques Op.32 (1905)
- L'Irresistible Op.33 (1908)
- Dearest (song) Op.38 No.1 (1911)
- Polonaise in A-flat major Op.39 No.2 (1913)
- 2 Pianoforte Compositions Op.41 (1921) 1.? 2.The Whirling Doll - Impromptu
- "The International Library of Music For Home and Studio, Study Material in Four Books" (1925), Published by the University Society of New York in the United States
