= The Concert (play) =

1909 play by Hermann Bahr

The Concert is a 1909 German comedic play by Hermann Bahr that was adapted for the American stage by Leo Ditrichstein.

The German play debuted at the Lessing Theater in Berlin on December 23, 1909. In America, it had a 264 performance run at the Belasco Theatre on Broadway from October 4, 1910 to May 1911. It also had a 1911 run in London.

The success of the American adaptation has been credited to Ditrichstein's work more than the original play. As was successful with other adaptations of foreign works in this period, Ditrichstein removed any trace of foreignness from the play and created a show expertly honed for commercial success.

== Broadway cast ==
- Gabor Arany by Leo Ditrichstein
- Dr. Dallas by William Morris
- McGinnis by John W. Cape
- Helen Arany by Janet Beecher
- Flora Dallas by Jane Grey
- Eva Wharton by Alice L. Pollock
- Mrs. McGinnis by Belle Theodore
- Miss Merk by Catherine Proctor
- Fanny Martin by Edith Cartwright
- Claire Flower by Margaret Bloodgood
- Natale Moncrieff by Adel. Barrett
- Edith Gordon by Cora Witherspoon
- Georgine Roland by Elsie Glynn
- Laura Sage by Edna Griffin
- Mrs. Lennon-Roch by Kath. Tyndall

== See also ==
- The Concert (1921 film)
- The Concert (1931 film)
