= In the Good Old Summer Time =

1902 American song

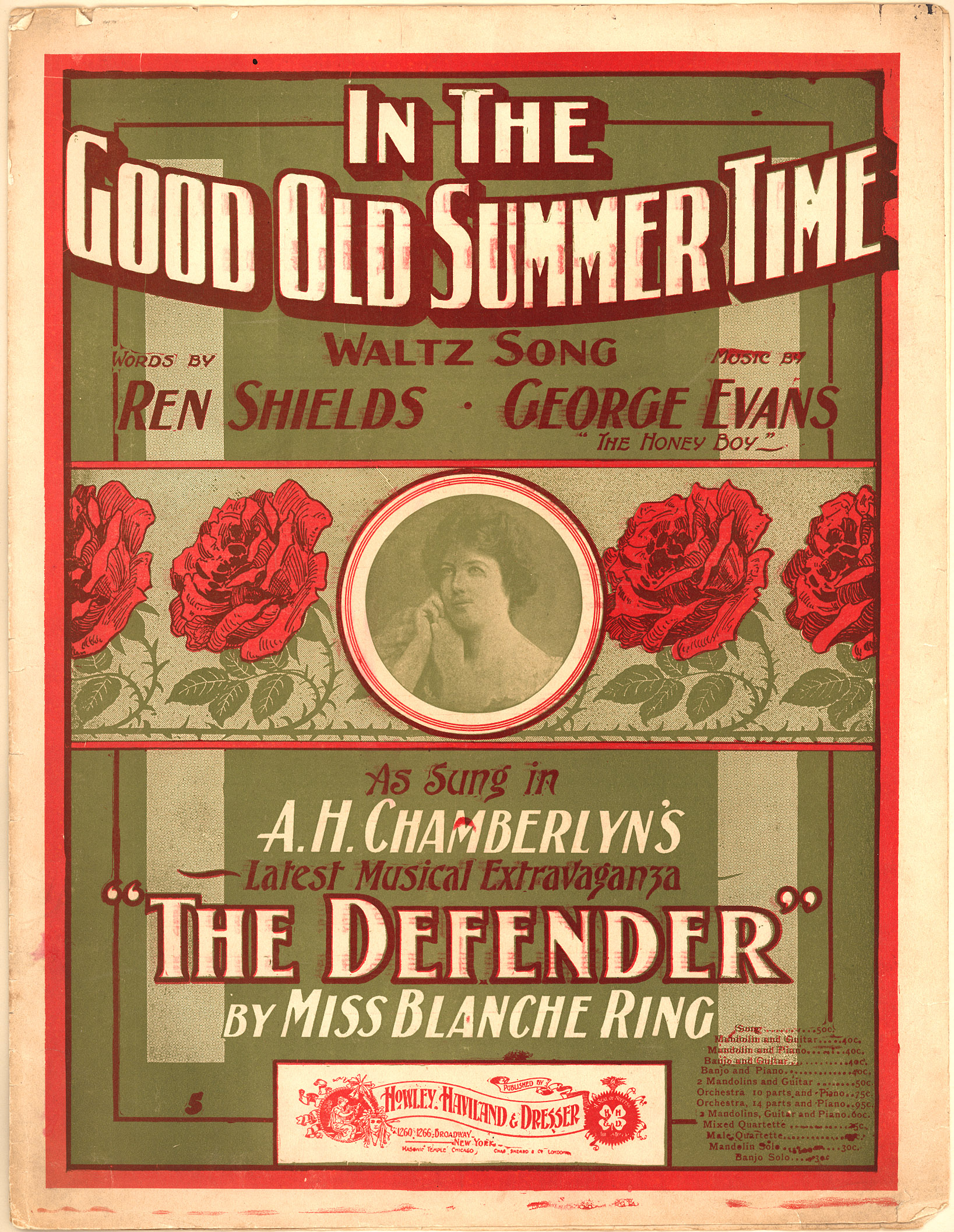
- 1902 sheet music cover with insert photo of singer Blanche Ring

Song
- Language: English
- Published: 1902 by Howley, Haviland, and Dresser
- Composer: George Evans
- Lyricist: Ren Shields

"In the Good Old Summer Time" is an American Tin Pan Alley song first published in 1902 with music by George Evans and lyrics by Ren Shields. The song is in the public domain.

== Background ==
Shields and Evans were at first unsuccessful in trying to sell the song to one of New York's big sheet music publishers. The publishers thought the topic of the song doomed it to be forgotten at the end of the summer season. Blanche Ring, who had helped Evans arrange the number's piano score, was enthusiastic about it and at her urging it was added to the 1902 musical comedy show The Defender she was appearing in. The song was a hit from the opening night, with the audience often joining in singing the chorus.

"In the Good Old Summer Time" was one of the big hits of the era, selling popular sheet music and being recorded by various artists of the day, including John Philip Sousa's band in 1903. It has remained a standard often revived in the decades since.

The song appeared in many films, including the 1949 Judy Garland film named after it, In the Good Old Summertime. The book Elmer Gantry opens with the title character drunkenly singing the song in the saloon. It is also prominently featured in "The Picnic", an early Mickey Mouse cartoon from 1930.

The chorus is used with a slight twist in the "baby mine" lyric before resuming to the "tootsie-wootsie" lyric in a commercial for Off! bug spray that aired during the summer of 1975.

The song appeared in the episode "Tipping the Scales" of the PBS show Arthur, and featured in the 1930 Laurel and Hardy short Below Zero in ironical terms, sung during a snowstorm.

The song was sung during a wedding in the opening chapter of Upton Sinclair's novel The Jungle.

The chorus is used with a slight twist in Baylor University's Alma Mater, "That Good Old Baylor Line."

The song appears in the 1978 episode of The Muppet Show performed by Pearl Bailey and Floyd Pepper, a member of Dr. Teeth and the Electric Mayhem.

== Lyrics ==
There's a time in each year
That we always hold dear,
Good old summer time;
With the birds and the trees-es,
And sweet scented breezes,
Good old summer time,
When your day's work is over
Then you are in clover,
And life is one beautiful rhyme,
No trouble annoying,
Each one is enjoying,
The good old summer time.

In the good old summer time,
In the good old summer time,
Strolling thro' the shady lanes
With your baby mine;
You hold her hand and she holds yours,
And that's a very good sign
That she's your tootsie wootsie
In the good old summer time.

To swim in the pool,
You'd play "hooky" from school,
Good old summer time;
You'd play "ring-a-rosie"
With Jim, Kate and Josie,
Good old summer time,
Those days full of pleasure
We now fondly treasure,
When we never thought it a crime
To go stealing cherries,
With face brown as berries,
Good old summer time.

In the good old summer time,
In the good old summer time,
Strolling thro' the shady lanes
With your baby mine;
You hold her hand and she holds yours,
And that's a very good sign
That she's your tootsie wootsie
In the good old summer time.

The original publication includes extensive additional lyrics by Ren Shields that are seldom performed.

== Notable recordings ==
- J. W. Myers (1902)
- Haydn Quartet (1903)
- Featured in Disney's The Picnic (1930)
- The Andrews Sisters & Dan Dailey (1949)
- Bing Crosby (1954) and for his album Seasons (1977)
- Connie Francis for the album Sing Along with Connie Francis (1961)
- Les Paul and Mary Ford (1952) – this reached No 15 in the Billboard charts
- Michael Holliday (1959)
- Nat King Cole for the album Those Lazy-Hazy-Crazy Days of Summer (1963)
- Larry Groce (1979)
- Kidsongs Kids (1997)
- Daniel Brummel (1999)
- Chuck E. Cheese cast (2000)
- The cast of Arthur (2004)
