= Leo Ditrichstein =

Austrian-American actor and writer (1865–1928)

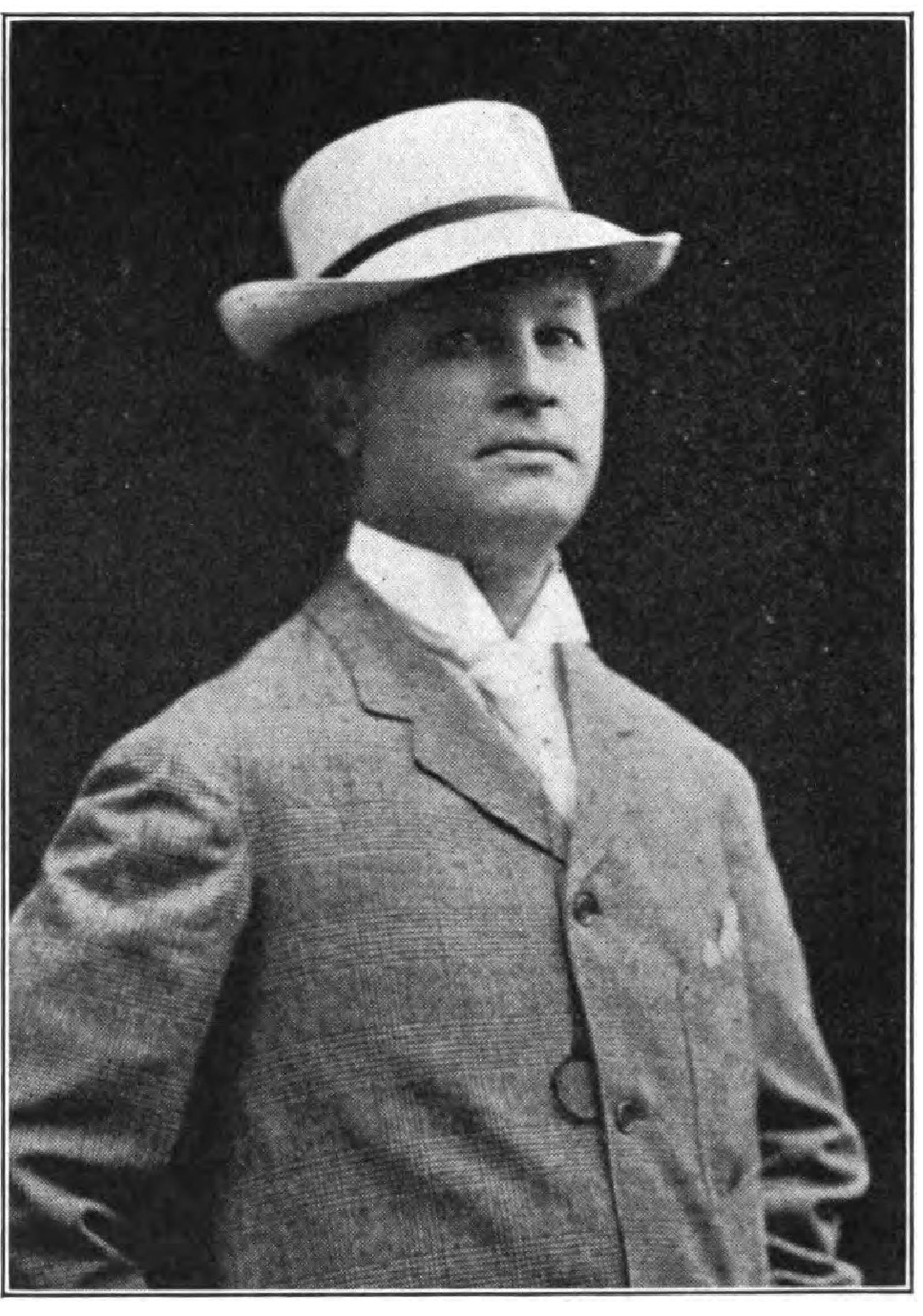
- Born: Leo James Ditrichstein; January 6, 1865; Temesvár, Austria-Hungary
- Died: June 28, 1928 (aged 63); Auersperg sanitarium Vienna, Austria

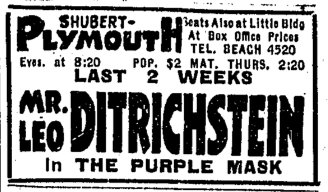
Advertisement for Ditrichstein's appearance at Plymouth Theatre (Boston), 1921

Leo Ditrichstein (January 6, 1865 – June 28, 1928) was an Austrian-American actor and playwright.

== Early life ==
He was born on January 6, 1865, in Temesvár, Austro-Hungarian Empire. He was educated in Vienna and was naturalized as an American citizen in 1897. His grandfather was Hungarian novelist József Eötvös who is sometimes listed as Joseph von Etooes.

== Career ==
He made his New York début in Die Ehre (1890). This was followed by Mr. Wilkinson's Widows, Trilby, Are You a Mason? and other plays. He was featured in Right is Might by Pedro Calderon de la Barca at the Lyric Theatre in Philadelphia in 1923. He was the author of numerous plays, among which are: Gossip (with Clyde Fitch, 1895); A Southern Romance (1897); The Last Appeal (1901); What's the Matter with Susan? (1904); The Ambitious Mrs. Susan (1907); The Million (from the French, 1911); The Concert (1910); The Temperamental Journey (1913); The Great Lover (1915); The Judge of Zalmea (1917). Ditrichstein appeared in one motion picture, in a cameo as himself, in How Molly Made Good (1915).

Some of the plays Ditrichstein either wrote or acted in have been made into motion pictures. The Divorce Game (1917) was based on his play Mlle. Fifi.

He died on June 28, 1928, from heart disease at the Auersperg Sanitarium in Vienna.
