= Sunday (1915 film) =

1915 silent film

- Directed by: George W. Lederer
- Written by: Thomas Raceward (play); Herbert Hall Winslow
- Produced by: George W. Lederer
- Starring: Reine Davies; Montagu Love; Barney McPhee
- Production company: George W. Lederer Stage Filmotions
- Distributed by: World Film
- Release date: August 2, 1915
- Running time: 50 minutes
- Country: United States
- Languages: Silent; English intertitles

Sunday is a 1915 American silent drama film directed by George W. Lederer and starring Reine Davies, Montagu Love and Barney McPhee.

== Cast ==
- Reine Davies as Sunday
- Montagu Love as Henry Brinthorpe
- Barney McPhee as Arthur Brinthorpe
- Charles Trowbridge as Jacky
- William H. Tooker as Towzer
- Al Hart as Davy
- Adolf Link as Lively
- Jeanette Bageard as Lizette
- Charles Dickson as Tom Oxley

== Bibliography ==
- Goble, Alan. The Complete Index to Literary Sources in Film. Walter de Gruyter, 1999.
