= Pepi Lederer =

American actress

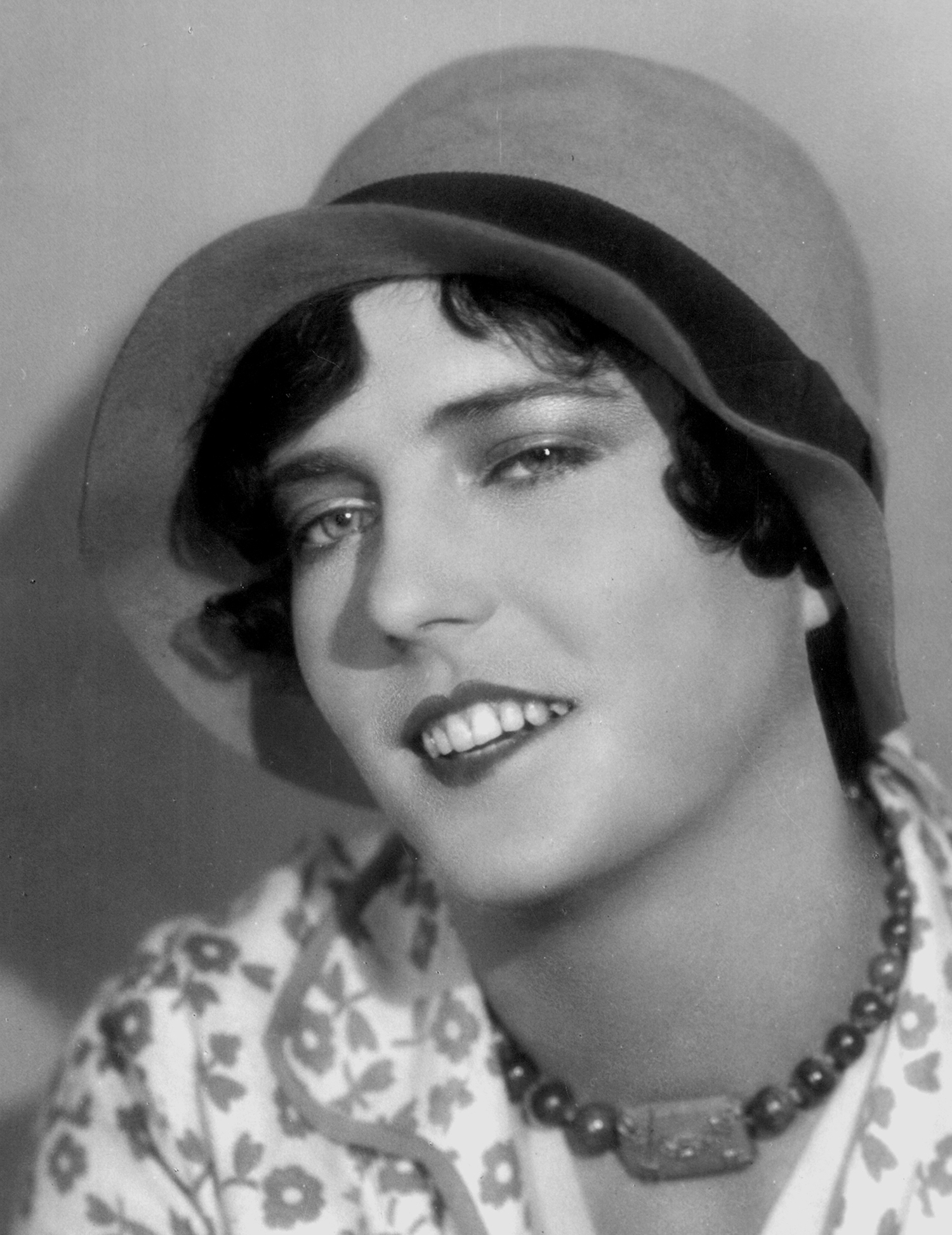
- Lederer in 1930
- Born: Josephine Rose Lederer; March 18, 1910; Chicago, Illinois, U.S.
- Died: June 11, 1935 (aged 25); Los Angeles, California, U.S.
- Education: Westlake School for Girls
- Parents: George Lederer (father); Reine Davies (mother)
- Relatives: Charles Lederer (brother); Marion Davies (aunt); Rosemary Davies (aunt); Patricia Lake (cousin)

Pepi Lederer (born Josephine Rose Lederer; March 18, 1910 – June 11, 1935) was an American actress and writer. She was the niece of actress Marion Davies, the longtime mistress of newspaper publisher William Randolph Hearst. After her parents divorced, Lederer was raised in Southern California by her wealthy aunt at her Beverly Hills estate and later at Hearst Castle in San Simeon.

As a high-spirited lesbian, Lederer became a popular figure in the gay and bisexual community of Jazz Age Hollywood. She had many sexual relationships with women, including actress Nina Mae McKinney. In May 1935, due to either her drug addiction or sexual orientation, William Randolph Hearst committed Lederer against her will to a psychiatric ward at Good Samaritan Hospital.

In June 1935, a 25-year-old Lederer committed suicide by jumping from a sixth-floor hospital window. Although early newspaper obituaries reported her death as a suicide, obituaries in Hearst's papers depicted her death as an accident and attributed her hospitalization to "a nervous breakdown caused by overstudy". Lederer is buried at Hollywood Forever Cemetery in Los Angeles.

== Family and early years ==
Born Josephine Rose Lederer in Chicago in 1910, Lederer was the daughter of stage actress Reine Davies (née Douras), the sister of Rosemary and Marion Davies, and her first husband George W. Lederer, a Broadway theatrical producer and director. Lederer had a younger brother, Charles Lederer, known as "Charlie". Her brother became a well-known Hollywood screenwriter who co-wrote The Front Page (1931), His Girl Friday (1940), and Gentlemen Prefer Blondes (1953). During her childhood, Lederer's family nicknamed her "Peppy" due to her high-spirited personality. At the age of 18, she changed the spelling to "Pepi" and legally changed it to her first name.

Due to her mother Reine's alcoholism, her aunt Marion Davies raised Lederer and her brother, and the two children lived in Davies' luxurious Beverly Hills estate. Lederer's mother occasionally appeared uninvited and accused Davies of stealing her children. When Davies entered into a relationship with publishing tycoon William Randolph Hearst, Lederer and her brother moved with Davies to the Hearst Castle, where she spent much of her early youth during the 1920s. At this time, Lederer attended the Westlake School for Girls in Los Angeles, California, and graduated in 1926.

== Life at Hearst Castle ==
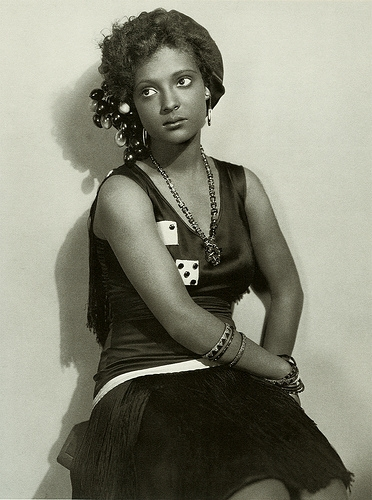
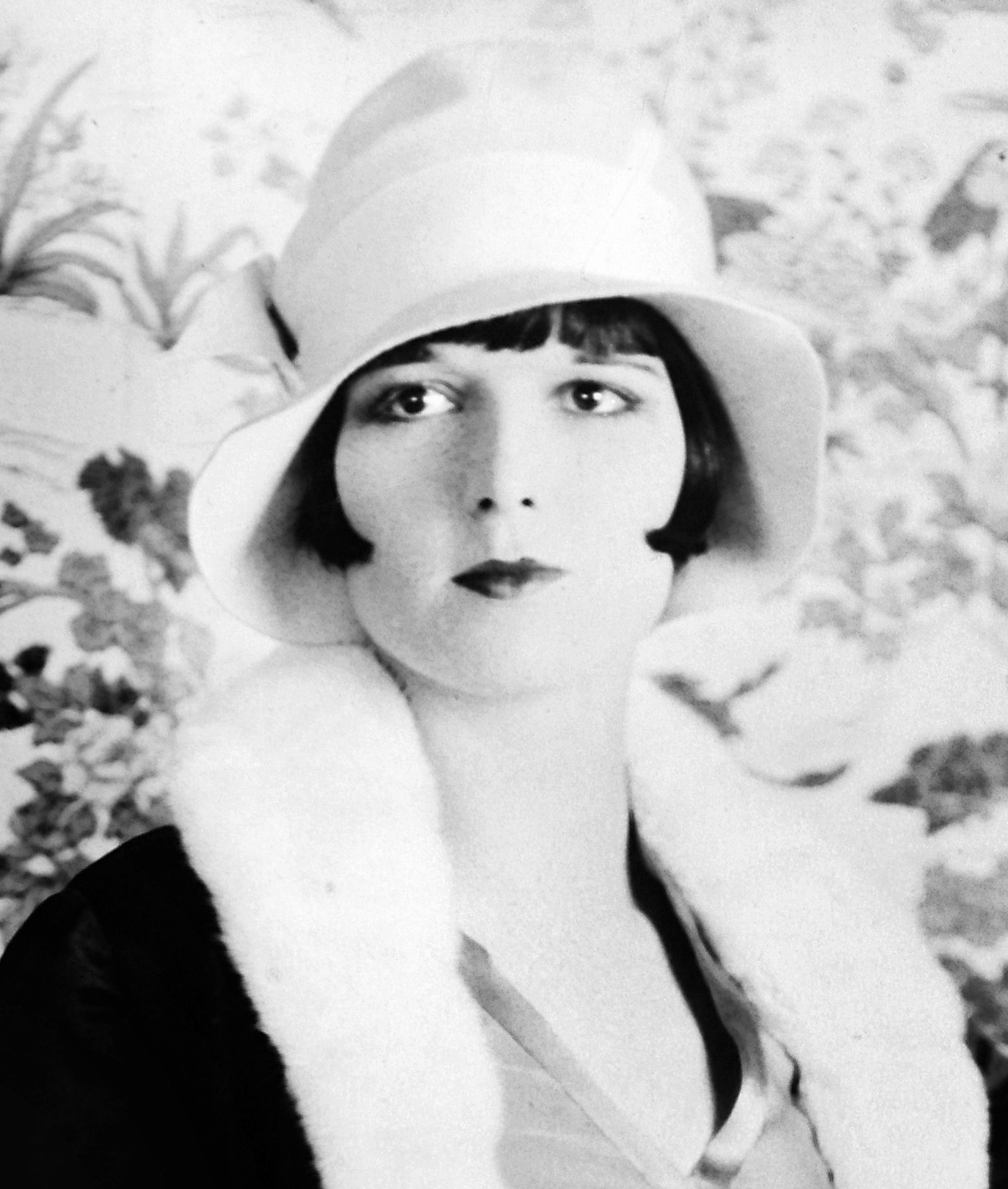
Lederer had romantic relationships with actresses Nina Mae McKinney and Louise Brooks.

As "the only fixed reality in an endless procession of celebrities" at Hearst Castle, Lederer often defied the rules of proper decorum set by Hearst and Davies and usually escaped unpunished. She often played pranks on Hearst's important guests, such as stealing actress Claire Windsor's "false bosom" and writer Elinor Glyn's red wig while they slept. She delighted in inventing outlandish stories about sensational events at Hearst Castle, and she planted these stories in Louella Parsons' syndicated gossip column much to Hearst's annoyance.

Although Hearst and Davies encouraged her brother Charles's ambition to become a screenwriter, they regarded Lederer's ambition to become a screen actress far less seriously. Davies secured a part for her niece in her 1927 film The Fair Co-Ed, but the final cut eliminated Lederer's role in the film. Davies promised her distraught niece a role in another upcoming film, but her acting career consisted only of a few small parts in Davies' films.

== Addiction and abortion ==
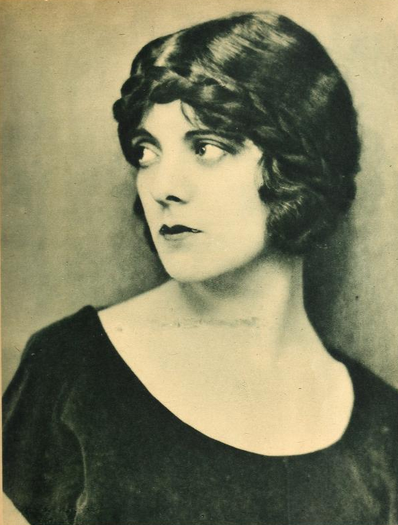
Alma Rubens circa 1923

In December 1929, Lederer upset Davies and Hearst after a mutual acquaintance revealed her sexual relationship with African-American actress Nina Mae McKinney. During Lederer's affair with Nina Mae McKinney at Davies' Beverly Hills estate on Lexington Road, neighbors became irate at seeing black visitors on the adjacent premises and telephoned Davies. Davies' sister Ethel visited the premises and found Lederer in bed with McKinney. Outraged, Davies and Hearst shipped Lederer to New York City.

Alone in New York, Lederer lived in an apartment at 42 West Fifty-fourth Street and continued having sexual relations with women. During this period of exile, Lederer became friends with actress Alma Rubens, and both women allegedly shared an addiction to drugs, including heroin and morphine, supplied by Marion Davies' doctors. A 33-year-old Rubens died a year later in January 1931.

Following a riotous New Year's Eve party in 1930, a male acquaintance drove an inebriated Lederer to her New York apartment and, after she became unconscious, raped her. At the end of March 1930, while still in New York, Lederer discovered she had become pregnant by her rapist. As an overt lesbian exclusively attracted to women, the news of Lederer's pregnancy shocked her friends and family. Acting on advice from her aunt Marion, Lederer procured a black-market abortion. The abortion resulted in severe complications that caused her lingering health problems.

== Life abroad and return ==
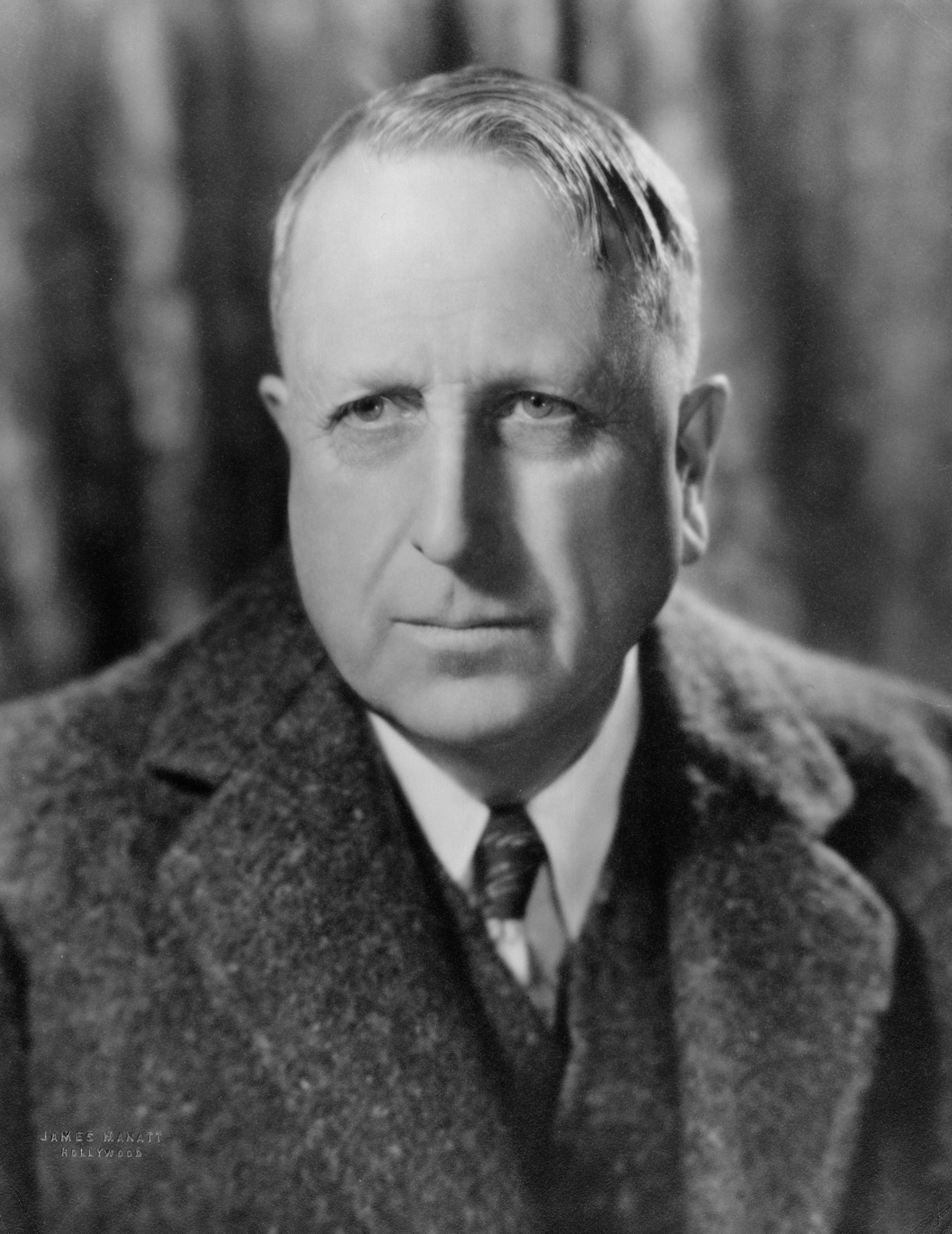
William Randolph Hearst

After recovering from the abortion procedure, Lederer traveled with her aunt Marion and Hearst to Europe in 1930. While abroad in England, Lederer convinced Hearst to hire her to work as a writer for one of his British magazines, The Connoisseur. Lederer enjoyed her new job and worked in London for the next five years on a generous allowance from Davies and Hearst. Lederer told her friend Louise Brooks that she felt happy living in London as she became her own person for the first time in her life.

In April 1935, Lederer returned to the United States with her girlfriend, Monica Morris, whom she met in London. The couple first arrived in New York City, where they stayed at William Randolph Hearst's suite at the Ritz Tower. After several weeks, Lederer and Morris departed for Los Angeles, where they stayed at Marion Davies' Beverly Hills mansion on Lexington Road. Davies and Hearst remained at San Simeon but, in an unusual move, they neither contacted Lederer nor invited her to any parties at Hearst Castle. At this point, Lederer had become persona non grata at San Simeon due to both her worsening drug addiction and overt lesbian relationships.

== Commitment and death ==
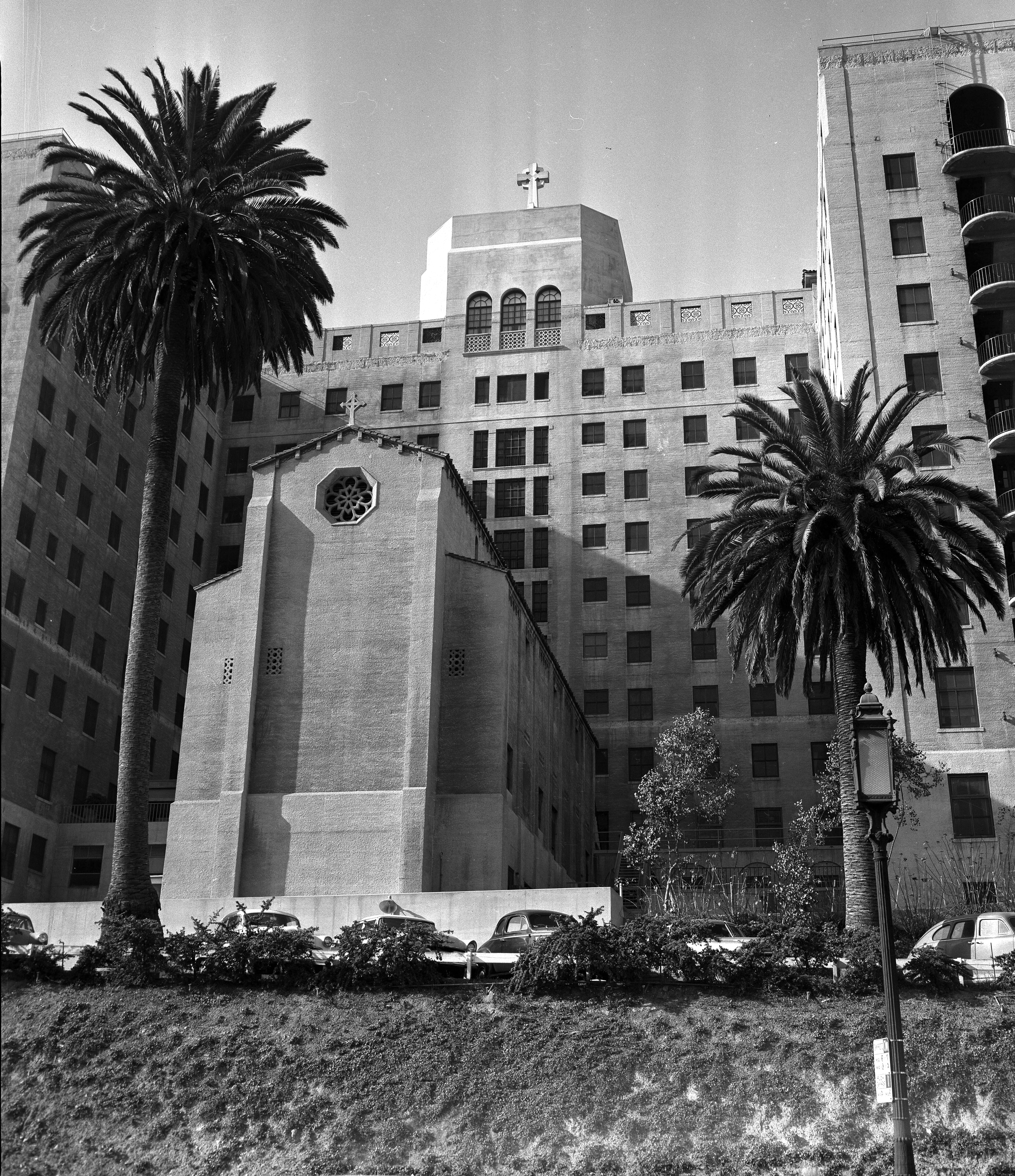
Good Samaritan Hospital

Either due to her drug addiction or her unconcealed sexual orientation, Hearst committed Lederer to the psychiatric ward of Good Samaritan Hospital at 1212 Shatto Street in late May 1935. On June 11, 1935, Lederer took her own life by distracting her nurse with a request for food and then jumping from the sixth-floor window of her hospital room. According to her nurse Marion Pope, Lederer had been seated in her hospital bed reading a motion picture magazine and asked for something to eat. "I turned just in time," Pope recalled, "to see Miss Lederer plunge against the window screen.... and she fell out."

Plummeting six stories to the shrubbery below, Lederer broke her neck upon impact. Hospital attendants rushed to the shrubbery, but she died within several minutes. She was 25 years old. Early newspaper obituaries attributed Lederer's suicide to "acute melancholia" as described by her doctor, Samuel Hirshfeld, a frequent visitor at San Simeon and a personal acquaintance of Hearst. A subsequent obituary printed by Hearst's flagship newspaper The San Francisco Examiner instead depicted Lederer's suicide as an accidental mishap and attributed her involuntary hospitalization to "a nervous breakdown caused by overstudy".

== Funeral ==
Two days after her suicide, the Church of St. Mary of the Angels held a funeral service on June 13, 1935. The Reverend Neal Dodd—who only a few weeks prior conducted funeral rites in the same church for Judge Bernard J. Douras, Marion's father and Pepi's grandfather—officiated the service. The family interred Lederer's body in their mausoleum at Hollywood Forever Cemetery in Los Angeles. Her pallbearers included Harpo Marx, Buster Collier, Orry Kelly, Ted Draper, Harry Crocker, Matt Moore, William Haines, and Jimmie Shields—William Haines' longtime gay partner. With the exception of Harpo Marx, nearly every pallbearer at Lederer's 1935 funeral was a prominent gay or bisexual figure in Jazz Age Hollywood.

== Filmography ==
Year	Title	Role	Notes
1928	The Cardboard Lover	Flapper	Only film role
