= Patricia Lake (disambiguation) =

Patricia Lake (1923–1993) was an American socialite, actress, and radio comedian.

Patricia Lake may also refer to:

- Patricia Lake (Alberta), lake in Jasper National Park, Alberta, Canada
- Patricia Lake (Wisconsin), lake in Oneida County, Wisconsin, United States
