= The Sin Woman =

1917 film

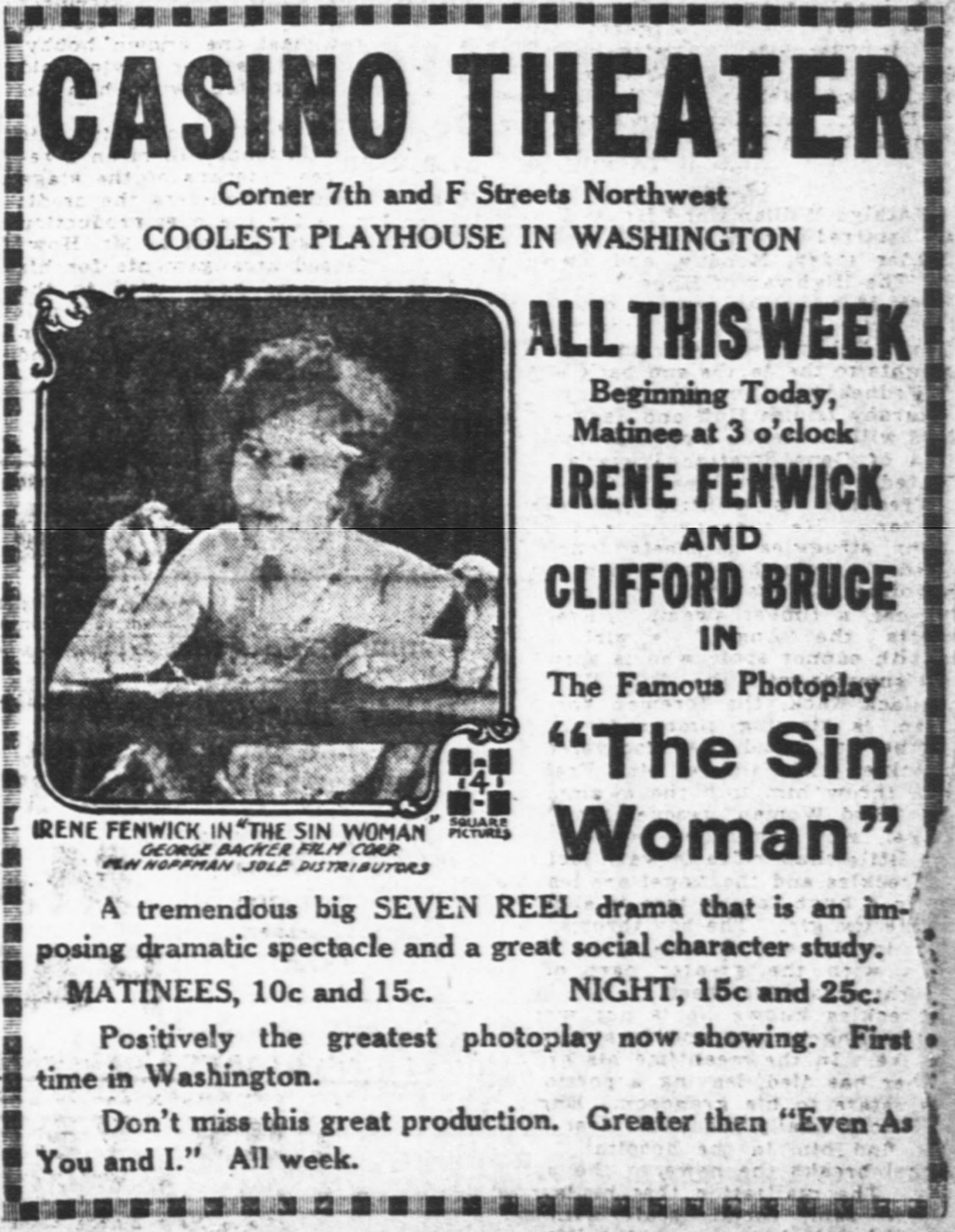
- Contemporary advertisement
- Directed by: George W. Lederer
- Written by: Herbert Hall Winslow (story); Edward Corbett (story)
- Produced by: George Backer
- Starring: Irene Fenwick
- Cinematography: H. E. Butler; Alfred Moses
- Distributed by: State's Rights; M. H. Hoffman Inc.
- Release date: April 1917
- Running time: 7-8 reels
- Country: United States
- Language: Silent (English intertitles)

Trailer for the film.

The Sin Woman is a lost 1917 American silent drama film starring Irene Fenwick as a vamp, the period slang for a femme fatale. The trailer for it still survives.

== Plot ==
As described in a film magazine, the film begins with Eve being tempted in the Garden of Eden, followed by the antecedents of the main character being tried and convicted for vampire work at various times. Which leads to a beautiful young woman, Grace Penrose (Fenwick), who due to her heredity leads the life of a vampire. She tires of the city life and heads for her lodge in the mountains. High up on the trail the sleigh she is riding in overturns and she is thrown in the snow. She is found by a young man, John Winthrop (Bruce), who is happily married. The young vampire becomes infatuated with him and is determined to win him, and when she finds out that he is married she wants him even more. The man leaves his wife Beth (Davies) and tells her why he is doing so. The wife says nothing, but after he leaves she tells her troubles to the female mayor, who also runs a hotel. As the son of the mayor had also been trifled with by the woman, she is anxious for revenge. The townspeople gather up some feathers and tar and head over to the lodge. As Grace is taken by the villagers to be tarred and feathered, while the husband begs for forgiveness, which is granted.

== Cast ==
- Irene Fenwick - Grace Penrose
- Clifford Bruce - John Winthrop
- Reine Davies - Beth Winthrop
- George Morgan - Dan Pratt
- Sara McVickar - Mrs. Pratt
- Wellington Playter - Driver
- Little Joan - Baby Winthrop

== Censorship ==
Before The Sin Woman could be exhibited in Kansas, the Kansas Board of Review required the shortening of all love scenes between Grace and John, and when John enters Grace's room, both in reel 5.

== Preservation ==
The National Film Preservation Foundation states this film coming from 1922 with a question mark, while other sources claim this film being released in 1917.
