= Charles Lederer =

American film director and screenwriter

- Born: December 31, 1910; New York City, US
- Died: March 5, 1976 (aged 65); Los Angeles, California, US
- Occupations: Director; producer; screenwriter; author
- Spouses: Virginia Nicolson (m. 1940; div. 1949) Anne Shirley (m. 1949)
- Children: 1
- Parents: George Lederer (father); Reine Davies (mother)
- Relatives: Pepi Lederer (sister); Marion Davies (aunt); Rosemary Davies (aunt); Patricia Lake (cousin)

Charles Davies Lederer (December 31, 1910 – March 5, 1976) was an American screenwriter and film director. He was born into a theatrical family in New York, and after his parents divorced, was raised in California by his aunt, Marion Davies, actress and mistress to newspaper publisher William Randolph Hearst. A child prodigy, he entered the University of California, Berkeley at age 13, but dropped out after a few years to work as a journalist with Hearst's newspapers.

Lederer is recognized for his comic and acerbic adaptations and collaborative screenplays of the 1940s and early 1950s. His screenplays frequently delved into the corrosive influences of wealth and power. His comedy writing was considered among the best of the period, and he, along with writer friends Ben Hecht and Herman Mankiewicz, became major contributors to the film genre known as "screwball comedy".

Among his notable screenplays which he wrote or co-wrote, were The Front Page (1931), the critically acclaimed His Girl Friday (1940), Gentlemen Prefer Blondes (1953), The Spirit of St. Louis (1957), Ocean's 11 (1960), and Mutiny on the Bounty (1962).

== Early life ==
Charles Davies Lederer was born in New York City to two prominent figures in the American theater, Broadway producer George Lederer and singer Reine Davies. After his parents were separated, Lederer and his older sister Pepi moved to California and were raised by his mother's sister, actress Marion Davies. He grew up in Hollywood, spending much time at San Simeon, the "enchanted castle on the hill", where his aunt reigned as publisher William Randolph Hearst's mistress. He was a child prodigy and was admitted to UC Berkeley at the age of 13, but dropped out a few years later to work as a journalist for Hearst's newspapers.

According to biographer William MacAdams, "Hollywood was home to Lederer, where for most people it was a place they moved to in order to work for the movies. Virtually none of the film community had grown up in Los Angeles, but Lederer had been brought there when he was 11 by Marion Davies, his mother's sister... Lederer thus knew the movie colony inside out as seen from the top and wasn’t impressed ..."

== Screenwriting career ==
When he was 19, Lederer became friends with Ben Hecht, who introduced him to the New York literati. His friendship with Hecht led to his being hired to write additional dialogue for the film The Front Page. He later moved back to Hollywood to become a full-time screenwriter.

Lederer is recognized for his acerbic wit, with adaptations and collaborative screenplays written mostly during the 1940s and early 1950s. His screenplays frequently delved into the corrosive influences of wealth and power. His comedy writing was also among the best of the period, and he, along with Hecht and Herman Mankiewicz became major contributors to the film genre known as "screwball comedy".

He was friends with screenwriters Joseph and Herman Mankiewicz. Herman would later become co-screenwriter of Citizen Kane. After becoming friends with Lederer, "Herman told Joe to come to the office of their mutual friend Charlie Lederer ... " Herman, who met Hearst as a result of his friendship with Lederer, later "saw Hearst as ‘a finagling, calculating, Machiavellian figure.’ But also, with Charlie Lederer, ... wrote and had printed parodies of Hearst newspapers ..."

As explained by The New Yorker film critic Pauline Kael, "Mankiewicz found himself on story-swapping terms with the power behind it all, Hearst himself. When he had been in Hollywood only a short time, he met Marion Davies and Hearst through his friendship with Charles Lederer, a writer, then in his early twenties, whom Ben Hecht had met and greatly admired in New York when Lederer was still in his teens. Lederer, a child prodigy, who had entered college at thirteen, got to know Mankiewicz ... Lederer was Marion Davies’s nephew – the son of her sister Reine ... Marion was childless, and Lederer was very close to her; he spent a great deal of his time at her various dwelling places, and took his friends to meet both her and Hearst.”

After finishing the script for Citizen Kane, Mankiewicz gave a copy to Lederer, which Kael explains was foolish:

He was so proud of his script that he lent a copy to Charles Lederer. In some crazily naive way, Mankiewicz seems to have imagined that Lederer would be pleased by how good it was. But Lederer, apparently, was deeply upset and took the script to his aunt and Hearst. It went from them to Hearst's lawyers. . . . It was probably as a result of Mankiewicz's idiotic indiscretion that the various forces were set in motion that resulted in the cancellation of the premiere at the Radio City Music Hall [and] the commercial failure of Citizen Kane.

Lederer, however, told director Peter Bogdanovich that Kael was totally incorrect in this matter, and "she never bothered to check with him." He did not, in fact, ever give the script to Davies. Lederer explains:

I gave it back to him. He asked me if I thought Marion would be offended and I said I didn't think so. The script I read didn't have any flavor of Marion and Hearst—Robert McCormick was the man it was about.

According to Hecht biographer, William MacAdams, "When Hecht began looking around for a new collaborator ... he thought of Charlie Lederer, whom he had met on one of his first trips to Los Angeles....In a letter to screenwriter Gene Fowler, Hecht called Lederer "a very tender soul....[who] captivated the New York literati just as the other Charlie (MacArthur) had a few years earlier."

=== Leading screenplays ===
Lederer (far right) directing Fingers at the Window (1942), with Basil Rathbone and Laraine Day, and cameraman Harry Stradling standing

His friendship with Hecht led to his being hired in 1931, when he was 20, to write additional dialogue for the film version of the 1928 play The Front Page. The film would be nominated for three Academy Awards, including Best Picture. In 1933, he made contributions to Hecht's screenplay for Topaze, along with many others, without being credited.

From 1940 to 1943 Lederer worked at MGM where he wrote a series of light comedies, usually centering on mismatched couples. Comrade X (1940), written in collaboration with Ben Hecht and directed by King Vidor is the story an American in Russia (Clark Gable) who falls in love with a streetcar conductor (Hedy Lamarr). In 1942 he directed his first film, Fingers at the Window, although he did not write the screenplay.

He penned the screenplay for the classic 1951 science-fiction/horror film The Thing from Another World, directed largely by Howard Hawks but credited to Christian Nyby and co-wrote the original 1960's Ocean's 11. Lederer wrote or co-wrote screenplays (notably with Ben Hecht) for Howard Hawks's production of His Girl Friday (a remake of The Front Page), Gentlemen Prefer Blondes, and the Lewis Milestone remake of Mutiny on the Bounty, starring Marlon Brando. His Girl Friday has remained his most popular and critically acclaimed screenplay. At the suggestion of the film's director, Howard Hawks, Lederer changed the sex of the lead character in the play, Hildy Johnson, from male to female.

With Ben Hecht, he co-wrote the original Kiss of Death which was to feature the actor Richard Widmark's chilling debut as the psychopathic killer with a giggle. In addition, he wrote and directed the 1959 film Never Steal Anything Small, an adaptation of a play by Maxwell Anderson and Rouben Mamoulian, starring James Cagney. The Spirit of St. Louis was Lederer's last significant film work. The films that followed that were primarily vehicles for established stars.

Lederer was valued as a Hollywood screenwriter who produced lively, acerbic adaptations and worked well in collaboration with others. He was also a member of another circle of writers on the East Coast which included Moss Hart, George S. Kaufman, Howard Dietz, Robert Benchley, Dorothy Parker, and editor Harold Ross. These writers were to become the nucleus of the Algonquin Round Table.

=== Awards ===
In 1954, he won three Tony Awards for the Broadway Musical Kismet, as Best Producer (Musical), as Best Author (Musical) with Luther Davis, and as co-author of the book which, with several collaborators, contributed to the Best Musical win.

== Personal life ==
=== Marion Davies' nephew ===
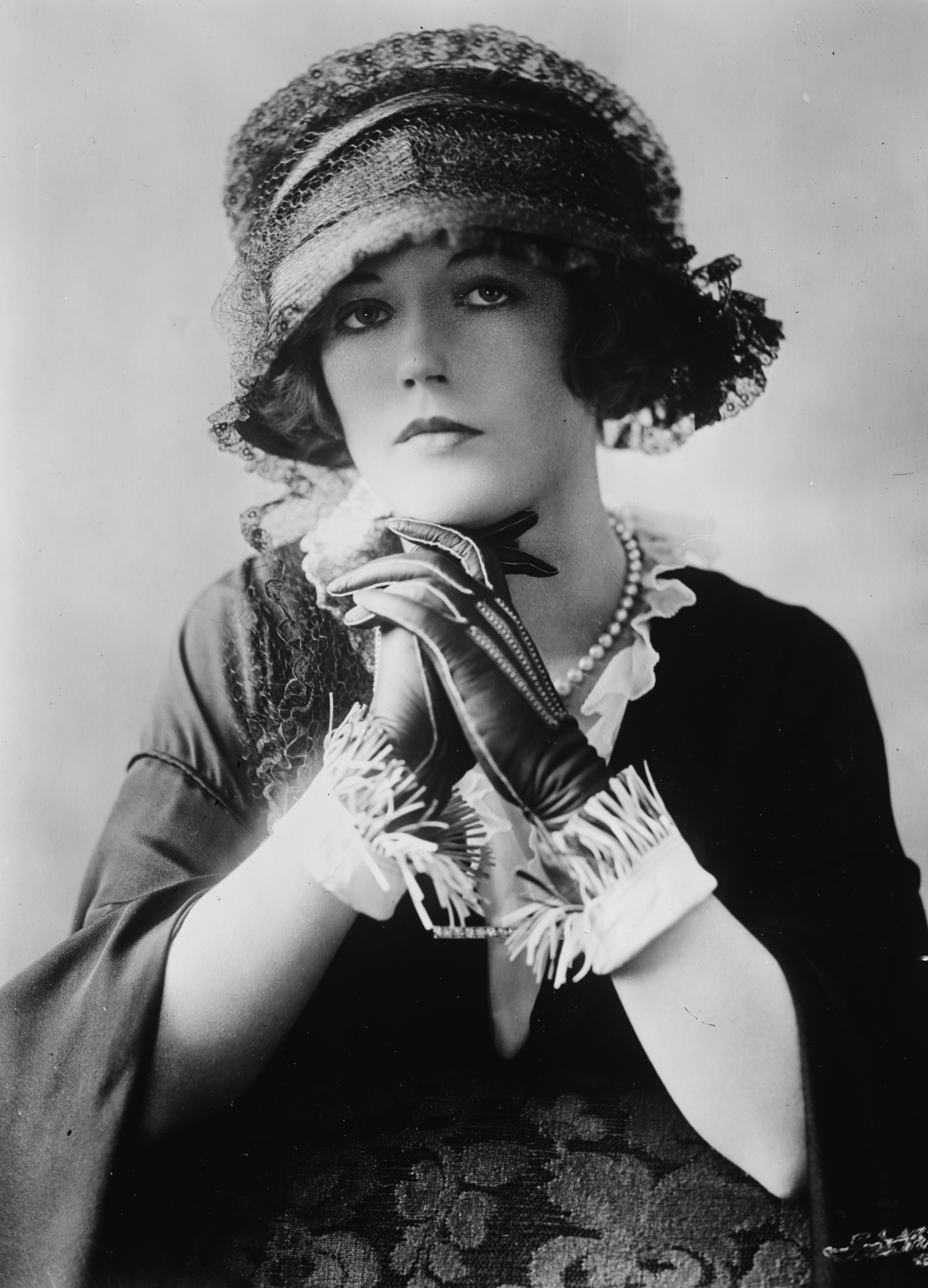
Lederer's aunt, Marion Davies

Lederer and his sister Pepi were raised by his aunt, actress Marion Davies. He grew up in Hollywood, and spent much of his time at Hearst Castle in San Simeon, his aunt's primary home with newspaper publisher William Randolph Hearst. According to Davies's biographer Fred Guiles, "Everyone close to Marion knew that Charlie was her favorite person after Hearst. . . . He was her knight-errant and no one, not even Hearst, ever reckoned with Marion alone from then on; they knew that they were dealing, too, with nephew Charlie."

Lederer's father, George Lederer, produced her first film, Runaway Romany. Hearst, who at that time had not known Davies, saw the film and offered Davies a one-year acting contract, leading to their future relationship and further roles for Davies.

In July 1928, Davies and Hearst left on a summer vacation to Europe. Among those invited who joined them, at Hearst's expense, were Lederer and his sister Pepi. During another summer trip to Europe in 1934, Hearst and Davies considered having Lederer write a scenario for a movie project called Movie Queen, a proposed film and vehicle for Davies that had been discussed in Hollywood. Hearst also asked Lederer to help rewrite the script for another Davies film, Hearts Divided (1936), which he did without credit.

In 1950, Hearst personally asked Lederer to find him an attorney to draw up a trust agreement for his will in order to provide Davies with a lifetime income from the Hearst estate after his death. Lederer remained close to Davies after Hearst's death in 1951. When Davies died in 1961 at age 64, nearly recovering from cancer treatments and deterioring health from years of heavy drinking, Lederer, along with Davies' husband and her sister, were at her bedside.

During his visits at Hearst's estate, Lederer befriended Charlie Chaplin, also a frequent visitor, and got a small role in his 1931 film, City Lights. The scene was cut from the final film, however, and the seven-minute clip was first publicly shown in the 1983 documentary Unknown Chaplin.

=== Marriages ===
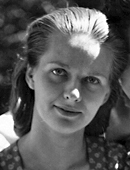
Virginia Nicolson Welles in 1938

Lederer married Virginia Nicolson Welles, ex-wife of Orson Welles, May 18, 1940, in Phoenix, Arizona. Lederer, at the time, was a "good friend" of Welles, notes Welles biographer Peter Bogdanovich According to Guiles, "she married Charlie… coming back to the Lederer home on Bedford Drive [in Los Angeles] with her young daughter, Chris, Welles’ first-born child.” The couple divorced in 1949.

Lederer's second wife was actress Anne Shirley whom he married in 1949.

=== Friendships ===
==== Orson Welles ====
Welles biographer Barbara Leaming states that after Lederer married Welles's first wife in 1940, "earnestly trying to protect the best interests of Virginia and particularly of his daughter Chris, Lederer had angry run-ins with Orson, whom he accused of not living up to the divorce settlement. Now, in the unlikeliest of turnarounds, Orson and the witty, intelligent Lederer became great chums." Welles himself said of the Lederers, "I liked them together," and he soon entered into a friendly relationship that he describes as a "strange design for living at the beach."

Welles became famous in the movie world after the release of Citizen Kane in 1941, a story based in part on the life of William Randolph Hearst. The story attempts to solve the mystery of newspaper publisher Charles Foster Kane's last dying word: "Rosebud". Film critic David Thomson calls the word "the greatest secret in cinema." In 1989, author Gore Vidal disclosed that "Rosebud" was in fact a nickname which Hearst playfully used for the clitoris of his mistress, Marion Davies. Vidal said that Davies told this intimate detail to Lederer, who mentioned it to him. The claim about the meaning of "Rosebud" was repeated in the 1996 documentary The Battle Over Citizen Kane and again in the 1999 dramatic film RKO 281.

Years later, after Welles's second marriage to actress Rita Hayworth ended in 1948, he moved to a beach house next door to the palatial Marion Davies estate where his first wife Virginia and Lederer, her husband, resided. Welles lived there with Irish actress Geraldine Fitzgerald, and he soon became a "member of the household" of his former wife and Lederer.

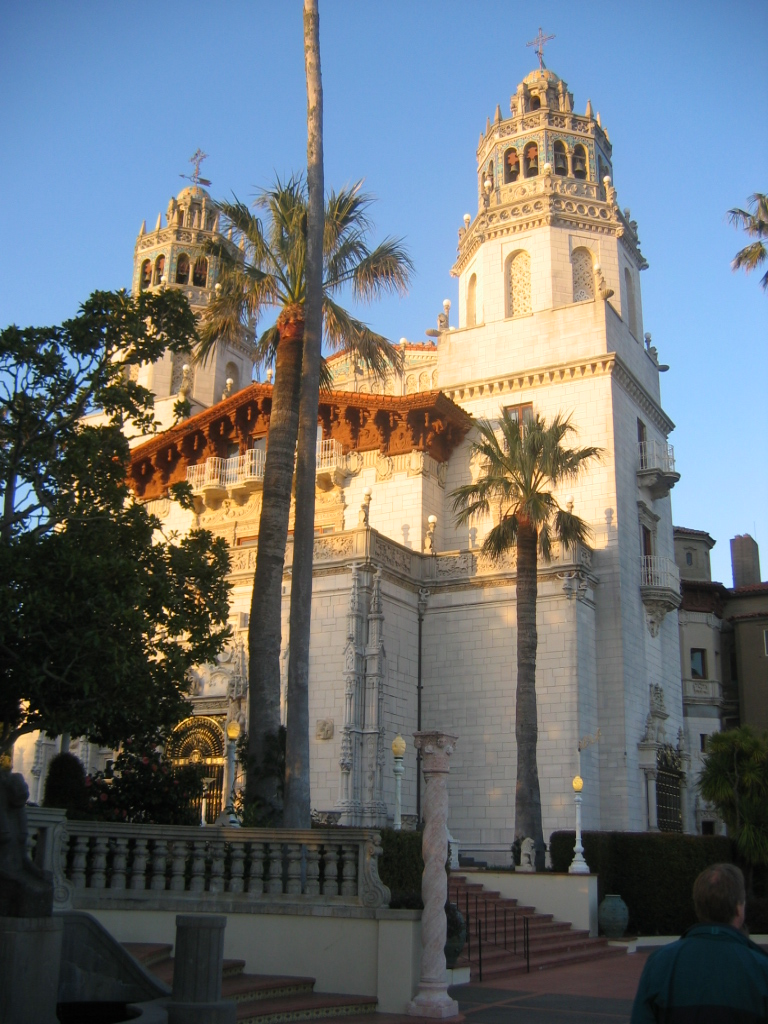
Hearst Castle at San Simeon

Chris Welles, in her biography, describes how her mother and stepfather remained friends with Welles despite the earlier problems:

He seemed to be great pals with my stepfather, Charlie Lederer. No one observing them together would have guessed that my mother and Charlie had sued my father for an increase in my child support. . . . Mother and Charlie had given up, and so it was back to "Orson, darling!" and a daily invitation to join them in the ritual of martinis on the front porch at sunset. He was more likely to arrive unannounced and then madden the cook by staying for lunch or dinner. Always casually dressed in summer slacks and an open shirt, he behaved as though he were a member of our household, coming and going as he pleased with no need to give an account of himself.

According to Welles biographer Frank Brady, Lederer and Welles would sometimes spend hours, or days, discussing various film projects or related properties that they might want to collaborate on. They both loved Tennessee Williams' The Glass Menagerie. There were also awkward periods that Welles remembers:

You see, he'd have Marion Davies for dinner. Virginia would say, "Now you stay away. Don't be seen." And so I'd come up to the window where their dinner table was, with my coat collar up as though it were snowing outside, and just stare in at them eating.

Lederer would often take Chris and Virginia to visit San Simeon, where Davies lived with William Randolph Hearst. She recalls, "Whenever we visited San Simeon, the grandiose castle . . . Charlie could not resist pulling the old man's leg:

"WR is the perfect fall guy," I remember Charlie telling my father one evening while the adults were having martinis on the porch. Then, to illustrate his point, my stepfather launched into his favorite story. Late one night at San Simeon, when everyone else was asleep, Charlie stole out to the gardens and dressed the marble statues of naked women in bras and panties. . . . In the morning, the grand old gentleman stood there bothered and befuddled as each of his guests stumbled half-asleep into the garden and began to howl with laughter.

Chris Welles adds that "aunt Marion, who had lost most of her relatives, was extremely close to Charlie." Lederer agreed, saying that "we're more like partners in crime than aunt and nephew." She remembers one occasion: "Charlie and Marion would exchange a wicked glance and then begin turning somersaults in unison on one of Hearst's priceless Persian rugs." She writes, however, that she was unaware at the time of the complications that her visits to San Simeon caused:

I was too young to appreciate the irony of my position—both the child of the man who had made Citizen Kane and the stepchild of Marion Davies's beloved nephew. Marion, Charlie, and my mother feared that the mere sight of "Orson's kid" might give Pops apoplexy . . .

Virginia Welles gave some of the reasons Lederer became close friends with Welles:

Orson and Charlie just naturally gravitated toward one another. They were both brilliant, highly sophisticated men living in a cultural desert. . . . So my two husbands got to be great friends, and they loved to commiserate about how difficult it was to be married to me. But when it came to their personalities, they couldn't have been more unalike. Charlie was such a dear, sweet, funny man, and he didn't have Orson's crushing ego. He was a hell of a lot easier to live with, I can tell you.

After completing Macbeth in late 1947, Welles planned to live and work in Europe to save on production costs. Before leaving, however, he came down with chicken pox, which he contracted from his daughter. He was forced to stay in New York's Waldorf hotel for three days, during which time Lederer remained with him while they worked on a script for The Shadow, which Welles was to direct. Later, after Welles had been living in Europe, spending most of his time and energy trying to obtain funds to both live and produce other films, Lederer loaned him $250,000.

==== Harpo, Ben Hecht, and a Comeuppance ====
Lederer was great friends with Harpo Marx and the two constantly cooked up practical jokes at the balls and parties they attended at Hearst Castle, the estate of William Randolph Hearst, such as stealing all the female guests' fur coats and draping them over the statues outside the estate during a heavy snowstorm.

Lederer was a close and lifelong friend of screenwriter Ben Hecht, with whom he co-wrote numerous screenplays. Hecht noted that Lederer was "half Jewish and half Irish," and soon after meeting him, wired Rose, his wife, "I have met a new friend. He has pointed teeth, pointed ears, is nineteen years old, completely bald and stands on his head a great deal. His name is Charles Lederer. I hope to bring him back to civilization with me." Hecht's 1963 autobiography, Gaily, Gaily, was dedicated, "For Charles Lederer, to read in his tub."

Lederer was famed on both coasts as a sardonic wit and "incessant practical joker," which endeared him to Hecht. Bennett Cerf's book Shake Well Before Using describes an incident during Lederer's career in the Army during World War II, when Lederer took revenge on an Englishwoman who had been making "rabid and noisy" remarks against Jews:

"Tell me, why don't you like the Jews?"

"Oh, I don't know. No reason I guess." Lederer yanked on [her china cabinet] door. Most of the china flew across the room.

"Well, now you've got a reason."

== Final years ==
According to Mankiewicz' biographer Richard Meryman, Lederer "isolated himself in his last years, contorted from arthritis, addicted to narcotics." He died in 1976, aged sixty-five.

== Filmography ==
=== Writer ===
- Kiss of Death (1995) (1947 screenplay)
- Kismet (1967) (TV) (musical libretto)
- A Global Affair (1964) (writer)
- Mutiny on the Bounty (1962) (screenplay)
- Follow That Dream (1962) (writer)
- Ocean's 11 (1960) (screenplay)
- Can-Can (1960) (screenplay)
- It Started with a Kiss (1959) (writer)
- Never Steal Anything Small (1959) (writer)
- The Fiend Who Walked the West (1958)
- Tip on a Dead Jockey (1957) (writer)
- The Spirit of St. Louis (1957) (adaptation)
- Gaby (1956) (writer)
- Kismet (1955) (musical libretto) (screenplay)
- Gentlemen Prefer Blondes (1953) (screenplay)
- O. Henry's Full House (1952) (uncredited)
- Monkey Business (1952) (screenplay)
- Fearless Fagan (1952) (writer)
- The Thing (1951) (writer)
- Wabash Avenue (1950) (screenplay) (story)
- Red, Hot and Blue (1949) (story)
- I Was a Male War Bride (1949) (screenplay)
- The Lady from Shanghai (1947) (uncredited)
- Her Husband's Affairs (1947) (writer)
- Ride the Pink Horse (1947) (writer)
- Kiss of Death (1947) (screenplay)
- Slightly Dangerous (1943) (screenplay)
- The Youngest Profession (1943) (screenplay)
- Love Crazy (1941) (screenplay)
- Comrade X (1940) (screenplay)
- I Love You Again (1940) (screenplay)
- His Girl Friday (1940) (screenplay)
- Broadway Serenade (1939) (screenplay)
- Within the Law (1939) (screenplay)
- Double or Nothing (1937) (writer)
- Mountain Music (1937) (writer)
- Baby Face Harrington (1935) (additional dialogue)
- Cock of the Air (1932) (writer)
- The Front Page (1931) (additional dialogue)

=== Director ===
- Never Steal Anything Small (1959)
- On the Loose (1951)
- Fingers at the Window (1942)

=== Actor ===
- City Lights (1931) (In unused scene) Telegraph Delivery Boy, included in 1983 Unknown Chaplin documentary.
