= The Sentimental Lady =

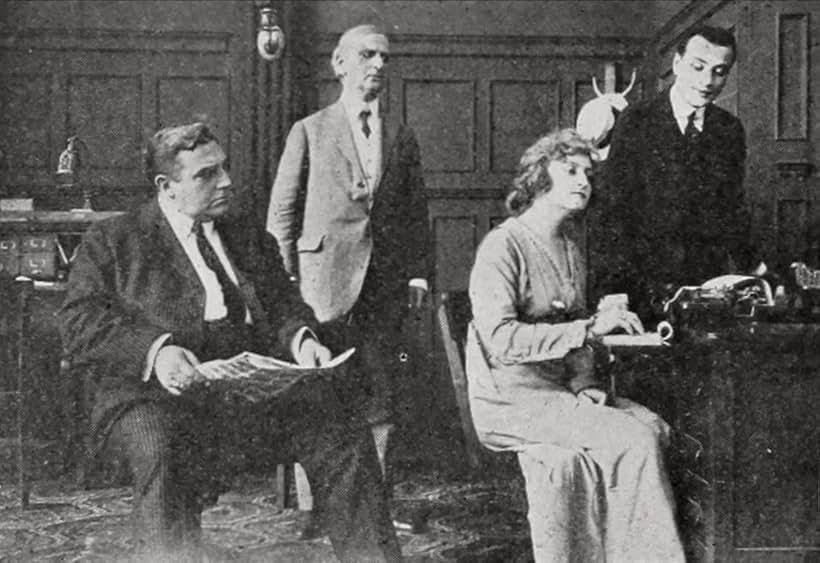
- Film still
- Directed by: Walter Edwin
- Written by: Owen Davis (scenario); Henry Kitchell Webster (scenario)
- Produced by: George Kleine
- Starring: Irene Fenwick
- Distributed by: Kleine-Edison
- Release date: November 3, 1915
- Running time: 5 reels
- Country: USA
- Language: Silent..English titles

The Sentimental Lady is a 1915 silent drama film produced by George Kleine and starring Irene Fenwick.

A copy is preserved in the Library of Congress collection.

== Cast ==
- Irene Fenwick - Amy Cary
- Frank Belcher - Amy's Uncle
- John Davidson - Norman Van Aulsten
- Thomas McGrath - Norman's Father
- Jack Devereaux - Bob Nelson
- Richie Ling - Johnson
- Anna Reader - Johnson's Daughter
- Lila Barclay - Helen Nelson
- Della Connor - Florence Russell
- Ben Taggart - Tom Woodbury
