= The Mad Marriage (1925 film) =

1925 film

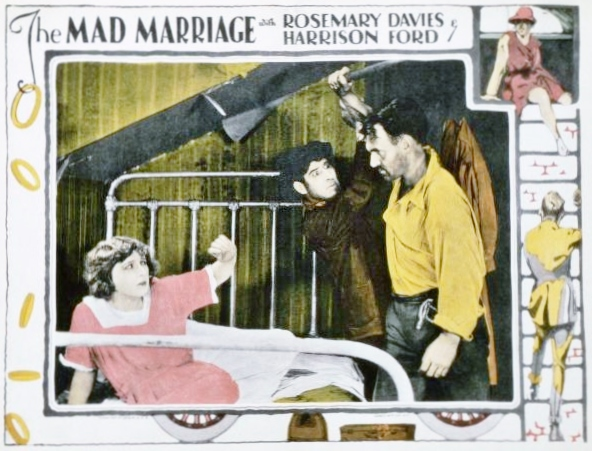
- Directed by: Frank P. Donovan
- Starring: Rosemary Davies
- Cinematography: Lester Lang; Frank Zucker
- Distributed by: Rosemary Films (on States Rights basis)
- Release date: January 31, 1925
- Running time: 50 minutes
- Country: USA
- Language: Silent...English intertitles

The Mad Marriage is a lost 1925 silent film drama directed by Frank P. Donovan. It starred Rosemary Davies, a sister of Marion Davies in her only film. The low-budget B-movie silent film boasted some well-known film names of the period.

== Cast ==
- Rosemary Davies - Alice Darvil
- Harrison Ford - Walter Butler
- Maurice Costello -
- Richard Carle -
- Paul Panzer -
- Florence Turner -
- Gaston Glass -
- Montagu Love -
- Walter McGrail -
- Mary Thurman -
- Charlotte Walker -
- Jean Girardin -
