= The Woman Next Door (1915 film) =

- Directed by: Walter Edwin
- Based on: The Woman Next Door play by Owen Davis
- Produced by: George Kleine Productions
- Starring: Irene Fenwick
- Distributed by: Kleine-Edison Feature Services
- Release date: September 1, 1915
- Running time: 5 reels
- Country: USA
- Language: Silent...English intertitles

The Woman Next Door is a lost 1915 silent film drama directed by Walter Edwin and starring Irene Fenwick.

== Cast ==
- Irene Fenwick - Jenny Gay
- Richie Ling - Ben Whittier
- Lawson Butt - Jack Lake
- Ben Taggart - Tom Grayson
- Della Connor - Cecilia Grayson
- Camilla Dalberg - Mrs. Grayson
- Albert Andruss - Judge Grayson
- John Nicholson - The Mexican Commandante
- William Bechtel -
