= Ben Taggart =

American actor (1889–1947)

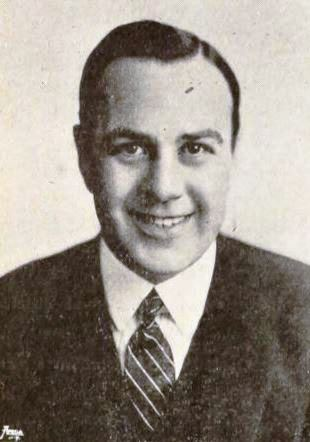
- Taggart in 1919
- Born: April 5, 1889; New York City, New York, U.S.
- Died: May 17, 1947 (aged 58); Santa Monica, California, U.S.
- Occupation: Actor
- Years active: 1915–1947

Ben Taggart (April 5, 1889 – May 17, 1947) was an American actor.

Taggart's stage experience began in Seattle, and he went on to play leading roles in Washington, Portland, San Francisco, Trenton, Milwaukee, and Philadelphia. He was described as "an adept comedian as well as a delineator of the more serious parts."

== Selected filmography ==
His first movie was The Woman Next Door in 1915; from 1931 to 1945 he appeared in a number of minor uncredited roles. Credited roles include:

- The Woman Next Door (1915) - Tom Grayson
- The Fixer (1915) - Mr. William Fowler
- The Sentimental Lady (1915) - Tom Woodbury
- She (1917) - Leo Vincey
- Oh, Boy! (1919) - Charles Hartley
- The Hidden Light (1920) - Victor Bailey
- Mammy (1930) - Sheriff (uncredited)
- Kick In (1931) - Detective Johnson (uncredited)
- Newly Rich (1931) - Mr. Black (uncredited)
- Smart Money (1931) - Hickory Short (uncredited)
- Silence (1931) - Alderman Conners
- Monkey Business (1931) (with the Marx Brothers) - Captain Corcoran (uncredited)
- 24 Hours (1931) - Detective (uncredited)
- Under Eighteen (1931) - Detective French (uncredited)
- Ladies of the Big House (1931) - Guard Tompkins (uncredited)
- Taxi! (1932) - Detective (uncredited)
- High Pressure (1932) - Attorney General's Officer (uncredited)
- Strangers in Love (1932) - Crenshaw
- Amateur Daddy (1932) - Deputy Sheriff (uncredited)
- The Strange Love of Molly Louvain (1932) - Policeman in Car (uncredited)
- Million Dollar Legs (1932) (with W.C. Fields) - the ship's captain (uncredited)
- Horse Feathers (1932) (with the Marx Brothers) - the cop who tries to give Harpo a ticket (uncredited)
- Hold 'Em Jail (1932) - Doorman (uncredited)
- Faithless (1932) - Officer Clancy (uncredited)
- Afraid to Talk (1932) - Detective Burke (uncredited)
- Central Park (1932) - Policeman Mike (uncredited)
- Fast Life (1932) - Catalina Cop (uncredited)
- A Lady's Profession (1933) - Lieutenant (uncredited)
- Fast Workers (1933) - Millie's Dance Partner (uncredited)
- Gabriel Over the White House (1933) - Cabinet Member (uncredited)
- The Mayor of Hell (1933) - Sheriff (uncredited)
- Hold Your Man (1933) - Policeman at Reformatory (uncredited)
- Duck Soup (1933) - Trench Officer (uncredited)
- From Headquarters (1933) - Third-Degree Detective (uncredited)
- Sitting Pretty (1933) - Cop (uncredited)
- The Big Shakedown (1934) - Policeman at Regan's (uncredited)
- No More Women (1934) - Cop (uncredited)
- The Crosby Case (1934) - Police Inspector (uncredited)
- The Thin Man (1934) - Police Captain (uncredited)
- Shoot the Works (1934) - Detective
- The Notorious Sophie Lang (1934) - Police Capt. Thompson
- Among the Missing (1934) - Police Officer Flannagan
- Ready for Love (1934) - Pullman Conductor (uncredited)
- Romance in Manhattan (1935) - Plainclothesman (uncredited)
- Carnival (1935) - Policeman (uncredited)
- The Whole Town's Talking (1935) - Traffic Officer (uncredited)
- Stolen Harmony (1935) - Sergeant / Cop at Motel (uncredited)
- Vagabond Lady (1935) - Hotel Detective (uncredited)
- Unknown Woman (1935) - Shanley
- Men Without Names (1935) - Police Lieutenant (uncredited)
- The Murder Man (1935) - Dave - Sing Sing Guard (uncredited)
- Coronado (1935) - Marine (uncredited)
- It Had to Happen (1936) - New York Cop (uncredited)
- Robin Hood of El Dorado (1936) - Rancher (uncredited)
- Florida Special (1936) - Trainmaster (uncredited)
- Neighborhood House (1936) - Cop
- San Francisco (1936) - Cop (uncredited)
- Straight from the Shoulder (1936) - Detective (uncredited)
- Wives Never Know (1936) - (uncredited)
- The Longest Night (1936) - Policeman Helping Eve (uncredited)
- Oh, Doctor (1937) - Policeman (uncredited)
- Michael O'Halloran (1937) - Officer Reardon (uncredited)
- This Is My Affair (1937) - Police Captain (uncredited)
- Souls at Sea (1937) - Ship's Officer (uncredited)
- Bad Guy (1937) - Desk Sergeant (uncredited)
- The Man Who Cried Wolf (1937) - Plainclothes Officer (uncredited)
- The Women Men Marry (1937) - Lieutenant Haggerty (uncredited)
- Youth on Parole (1937) - Convict (uncredited)
- Partners in Crime (1937) - First G-Man (uncredited)
- The Jury's Secret (1938) - Jenkins (uncredited)
- The Overland Express (1938) - Postal Agent Adams
- Hold That Kiss (1938) - Apartment Doorman (uncredited)
- Wives Under Suspicion (1938) - Fred - Police Lieutenant (uncredited)
- Little Tough Guy (1938) - Detective (uncredited)
- The Chaser (1938) - Policeman Reading Law to Motorman (uncredited)
- Personal Secretary (1938) - Detective (uncredited)
- Topper Takes a Trip (1938) - Policeman in Bank (uncredited)
- Risky Business (1939) - First Detective (uncredited)
- The Saint Strikes Back (1939) - New York Detective Vance (uncredited)
- King of Chinatown (1939) - Henchman (uncredited)
- Sergeant Madden (1939) - Detective (uncredited)
- Tell No Tales (1939) - Police Lieutenant (uncredited)
- S.O.S. Tidal Wave (1939) - (uncredited)
- The Gracie Allen Murder Case (1939) - Policeman (uncredited)
- Daredevils of the Red Circle (1939) - Dixon
- I Stole a Million (1939) - Police Guard at Hospital (uncredited)
- Rio (1939) - Second Guard (uncredited)
- Mr. Smith Goes to Washington (1939) - Pompous Man (uncredited)
- The Housekeeper's Daughter (1939) - Policeman (uncredited)
- Joe and Ethel Turp Call on the President (1939) - Postal Inspector (uncredited)
- The Big Guy (1939) - Owner of Station (uncredited)
- The Green Hornet (1940, Serial) - Phil Bartlett [Chs. 3-4]
- Double Alibi (1940) - Policeman (uncredited)
- The Ghost Comes Home (1940) - Tim Leary (uncredited)
- Flash Gordon Conquers the Universe (1940, Serial) - General Lupi [Chs. 1-2]
- Babies for Sale (1940) - Police Sgt. Mike Burke (uncredited)
- Son of Roaring Dan (1940) - Sheriff (uncredited)
- Mystery Sea Raider (1940) - Cop (uncredited)
- Pier 13 (1940) - Detective (uncredited)
- The Durango Kid (1940) - Flynn (uncredited)
- Before I Hang (1940) - Warden Thompson
- Junior G-Men (1940, Serial) - Severn
- Nobody's Children (1940) - Mr. Millar
- Girls Under 21 (1940) - Police Chief (uncredited)
- The Wildcat of Tucson (1940) - Judge John Barlow
- The Face Behind the Mask (1941) - Burn Treatment Doctor (uncredited)
- The Lone Wolf Takes a Chance (1941) - Train Conductor
- Double Date (1941) - Policeman (uncredited)
- Man Made Monster (1941) - Detective Sergeant Regan
- Penny Serenade (1941) - Policeman (uncredited)
- The Big Boss (1941) - Sheriff Dugan (uncredited)
- The Medico of Painted Springs (1941) - John Richards
- Hello, Sucker (1941) - Policeman (uncredited)
- Two in a Taxi (1941) - Sweeny
- They Meet Again (1941) - Sheriff (uncredited)
- Harmon of Michigan (1941) - Mr. Davis (uncredited)
- I'll Sell My Life (1941) - Police Lt. Hammer
- Hard Guy (1941) - Ben Sherwood
- Three Girls About Town (1941) - Doorman (uncredited)
- The Miracle Kid (1941) - J. Hamilton Gibbs
- Mr. District Attorney in the Carter Case (1941) - Police Sergeant (uncredited)
- Don Winslow of the Navy (1942) - John Blake
- A Tragedy at Midnight (1942) - Cop (uncredited)
- The Man Who Returned to Life (1942) - Horace Turner (uncredited)
- The Remarkable Andrew (1942) - Bailiff (uncredited)
- Alias Boston Blackie (1942) - Warden
- The Spoilers (1942) - Banker (uncredited)
- Men of Texas (1942) - Banker (uncredited)
- The Pride of the Yankees (1942) - Conductor (uncredited)
- Escape from Crime (1942) - Warden Kirby
- Overland Mail (1942, Serial) - Lamont [Chs. 7-8]
- Police Bullets (1942) - Chief Detective W. A. Barlow
- Daring Young Man (1942) - Fire Chief (uncredited)
- Underground Agent (1942) - Police Chief (uncredited)
- Pittsburgh (1942) - Police Sergeant (uncredited)
- The Valley of Vanishing Men (1942, Serial) - Editor Parker (uncredited)
- Secrets of the Underground (1942) - Bob the Detective (uncredited)
- No Time for Love (1943) - City General Manager (uncredited)
- Something to Shout About (1943) - Train Conductor (uncredited)
- Chatterbox (1943) - Foreman (uncredited)
- Mission to Moscow (1943) - Guest at Davies' Speech (uncredited)
- A Stranger in Town (1943) - Train Conductor (uncredited)
- So This Is Washington (1943) - Senator Vickers (uncredited)
- The Fighting Seabees (1944) - Aircraft Carrier Captain (uncredited)
- Beautiful But Broke (1944) - Pullman Conductor (uncredited)
- Captain America (1944, Serial) - Police Sgt. Donovan [Chs. 5, 9] (uncredited)
- Cowboy Canteen (1944) - Train Conductor (uncredited)
- Week-End Pass (1944) - Forean (uncredited)
- Sailor's Holiday (1944) - Director (uncredited)
- Jam Session (1944) - Willie (uncredited)
- The Girl in the Case (1944) - Turnkey (uncredited)
- The Great Alaskan Mystery (1944, Serial) - Deputy Marshal (uncredited)
- Man from Frisco (1944) - Superintendent (uncredited)
- Louisiana Hayride (1944) - Train Conductor (uncredited)
- Mr. Winkle Goes to War (1944) - Army Doctor (uncredited)
- Raiders of Ghost City (1944, Serial) - Dan #2 (uncredited)
- Atlantic City (1944) - Businessman (uncredited)
- One Mysterious Night (1944) - Traffic Cop (uncredited)
- Enemy of Women (1944) - News Chief (uncredited)
- The Master Key (1945, Serial) - Apartment Thug (uncredited) (final film role)
