= A Coney Island Princess =

1916 film by Dell Henderson

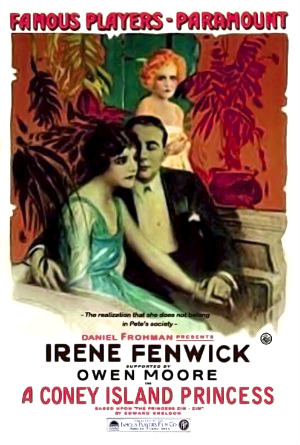
- Film poster
- Directed by: Dell Henderson
- Based on: Princess Zim-Zim (play) by Edward Sheldon
- Produced by: Adolph Zukor
- Starring: Irene Fenwick; Owen Moore
- Cinematography: Lewis W. Physioc
- Production company: Famous Players Film Company
- Distributed by: Paramount Pictures
- Release date: December 4, 1916
- Running time: 50 minutes; 5 reels
- Country: United States
- Languages: Silent (English intertitles)

A Coney Island Princess is a lost 1916 silent film comedy drama directed by Dell Henderson and starring Irene Fenwick. It is based on the play Princess Zim-Zim by Edward Sheldon. This film was Fenwick's first for the Famous Players Film Company and was partly filmed on location at Coney Island.

== Plot ==
The story evolves from a spat which Milholland has with his fiancée, Alice Gardner. While imbibing too freely in a foolish effort to assuage the pangs besetting him, he decides to sail for Europe, but he lands at Coney Island via the sight-seeing-car route, and in the course of zig-zag events he meets the Princess, an Oriental dancer, in a music hall. He becomes infatuated with her, and for the first time in his young pampered life he earns ten dollars playing a piano while she does her act on the stage. Eventually he takes the Princess to the home of his wealthy aunt, Mrs. King. Their betrothal is announced at a dinner on which occasion the Princess worries Pete and the many guests by her frequent breaches of etiquette. The next day Pete meets his former fiancée and quickly tells her that his love for the Princess is only a passing fancy. When the latter learns of this she returns to her father's Coney Island resort. There she realizes the folly of essaying to hold the fealty of a man abover her caste, and she cheerfully sets about to be happy with her lot. In the meantime a reconciliation reinstates Pete in the realm of bliss with his first love.

== Cast ==
- Irene Fenwick - Tessie,..aka Princess Zim-Zim
- Owen Moore - Pete Milholland
- Eva Francis - Alice Gardner
- Clifford Grey - Tony Graves (billed as Clifford B. Grey)
- William Bailey - Jan Kouver
- Kate Lester - Mrs. King
- Dora Mills Adams - Alice's Mother
- Russell Bassett - Old Mooney
