= Meet Me Tonight in Dreamland =

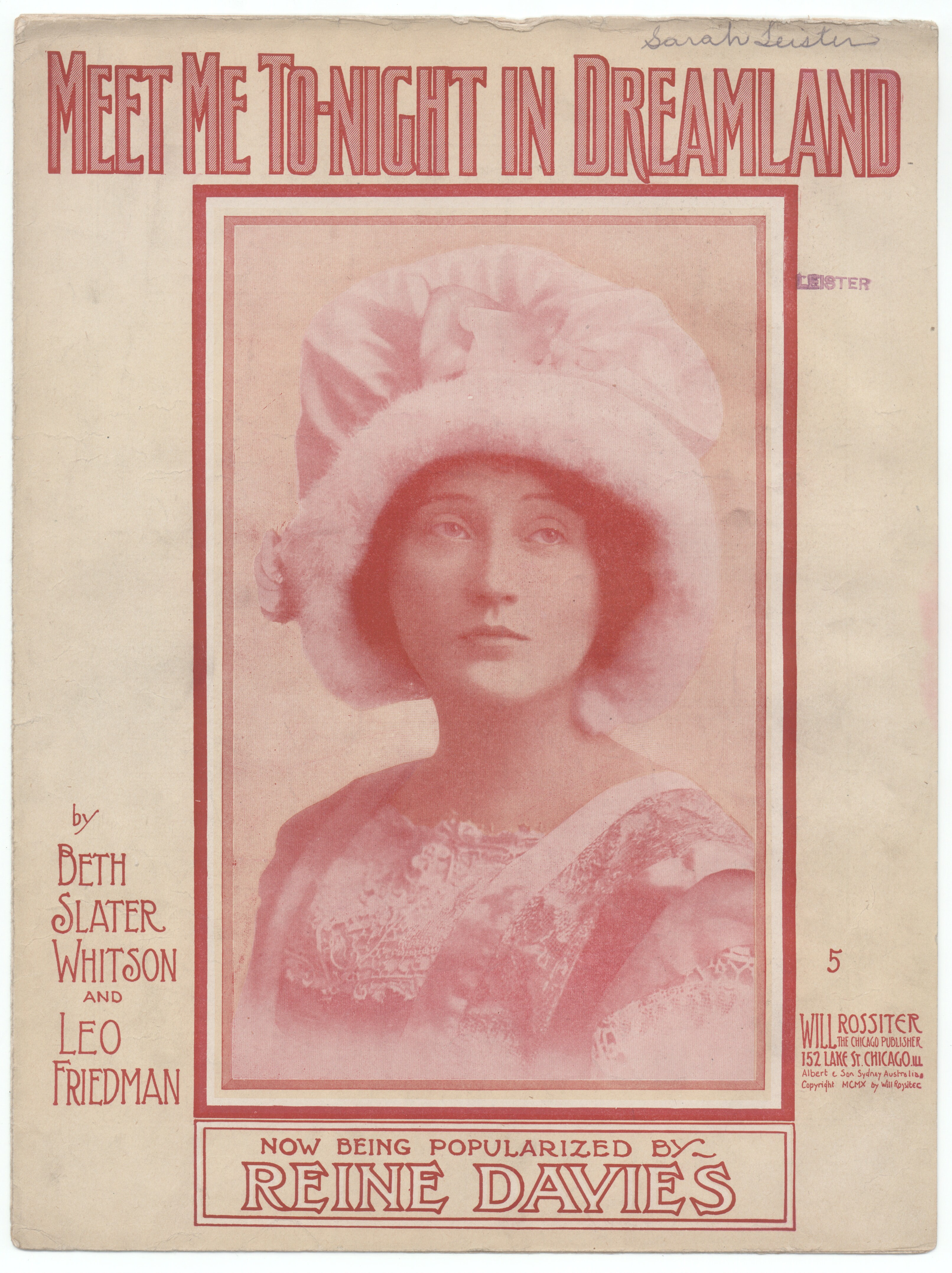
Sheet music cover for "Meet Me Tonight in Dreamland", featuring a photograph of actress Reine Davies (1909)

"Meet Me Tonight in Dreamland" was one of the most famous and beloved popular songs of the early 20th century. This gentle waltz, with lyrics by Beth Slater Whitson and music by Leo Friedman, was published in Chicago in 1909.

Friedman and Whitson sold it to the largest publisher in Chicago, Will Rossiter. Unfortunately, Rossiter never paid one cent to the authors in royalties. It was first introduced to the American public by Reine Davies (1883–1938), who was known as "The New American Beauty" and by her friends as "The True Blue" girl. Davies first introduced the song in New York at the leading vaudeville house, and received countless encores for her artistic work. Vera Berliner, "The Violinist With a Soul," played the chorus of this song, walking down the centre aisle, which made it an instantaneous success.

Originally, on the sheet music cover was an artist who was unknown. Rossiter then took a 1903 photo of Reine Davies and used her on his sheet music cover. After he did that, sales of the sheet music went to over two million in that first year. Some people mistakenly connect the song with the opening of Coney Island's Dreamland; however, Dreamland at Coney Island opened in 1904 while the song was written in 1909.

The chorus is:

Meet me tonight in dreamland,
under the silvery moon;
Meet me tonight in dreamland,
where love's sweet roses bloom.
Come with the love-light gleaming
in your dear eyes of blue;
Meet me in dreamland,
sweet dreamy dreamland;
There let my dreams come true.

== Recorded versions ==
There were three popular versions in 1910 by:

- Henry Burr
- Harry Anthony
- Elizabeth Wheeler

Other recordings were by:

- Jimmie Davis (1938)
- William Frawley - recorded for his album of classic songs, Bill Frawley Sings the Old Ones (1958)
- Vaughn Monroe and His Orchestra - recorded for RCA Victor circa 1946 (catalog No.20-1965).
- The Mills Brothers - for their album Barbershop Harmony (1960).
- Bing Crosby and Rosemary Clooney recorded the song as part of a medley for their radio show in 1961 and it was subsequently released on CD.

== Film appearances ==
- 1941 H. M. Pulham, Esq. - played while the children dance at school.
- 1941 Old Mother Riley's Circus
- 1949 In the Good Old Summertime - sung by Judy Garland and played at various times throughout the picture.
- 1953 Houdini, starring Tony Curtis, the song can be heard playing in the background during scenes depicting Houdini's courtship of his future wife, Bess. This is an anachronism, as Houdini met and courted Bess in the early 1890s, while the song was not published until 1909.
- 1953 The Eddie Cantor Story - sung by young Eddie on the platform.
- 1980 The Dream Merchants-the song is background music at the wedding of Johnny and Doris
- 2016 Dreamland - performed by Elmo Peeler.

== Appearance in fiction ==
- Early in the novel Sexus by Henry Miller, the song is mentioned as being sung during a dinner celebrating a work bonus of $350.
- The song is sung in the seventh episode of Wet Hot American Summer: Ten Years Later.
- The song is sung in the cabaret scenes in the episode Ah, Love! (season 3, episode 5), of Only Murders in the Building.
