= The Cardboard Lover =

1928 film

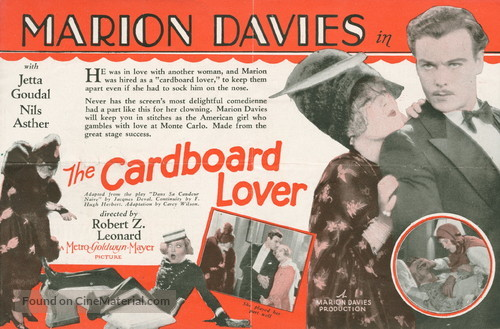
- Directed by: Robert Z. Leonard
- Written by: F. Hugh Herbert; Carey Wilson; Lucille Newmark
- Based on: Dans sa candeur naïve 1926 play by Jacques Deval; Her Cardboard Lover 1927 play by Valerie Wyngate P. G. Wodehouse
- Produced by: William Randolph Hearst; Harry Rapf; Marion Davies
- Starring: Marion Davies; Nils Asther; Jetta Goudal
- Cinematography: John Arnold
- Edited by: Basil Wrangell
- Production company: Cosmopolitan Productions
- Distributed by: Metro-Goldwyn-Mayer
- Release date: September 2, 1928
- Running time: 50 minutes
- Country: United States
- Language: Silent
- Budget: $379,000

The Cardboard Lover is a 1928 American silent romantic comedy film directed by Robert Z. Leonard and starring Marion Davies, Nils Asther and Jetta Goudal. It was produced by Cosmopolitan Productions and distributed by Metro Goldwyn Mayer.

The film is based on the 1926 play Dans sa candeur naive by Jacques Deval and its 1927 Broadway adaptation, Her Cardboard Lover by Valerie Wyngate and P.G. Wodehouse, with the genders of the main characters switched for the film.

The film survives at the Library of Congress and in the Turner library. It was remade as The Passionate Plumber in 1932 and Her Cardboard Lover in 1942.

== Plot ==
A group of young American women/flappers arrives at the Hotel Venitien on the French Riviera. In the hotel lobby, Sally Baxter encounters Monsieur de Segurola, "the famous baritone", and asks him to write something in her autograph album. However, when she reads what he has written, she tears it out. Next, she spots handsome Andre Briault, "the famous tennis champion", and his girlfriend Simone. After Andre drives away, Sally notices Simone and de Segurola making eye contact. (Albine, Andre's valet, does not approve of Simone either.)

When Andre later telephones Simone, he hears someone singing; Simone claims it is only a phonograph record playing, but then de Segurola coughs. Andre heads over to the hotel to check up on her. She tries to distract him, but Andre spots de Segurola trying to sneak out of her suite, tosses him out into the hall and breaks up with Simone.

The last part is witnessed by Sally. She chases after Andre to get his autograph, but her pen seems to be out of ink. After he leaves, she finds that there is ink after all; unable to get a taxi, she steals a car and follows him to the casino. There, she inadvertently loses 50,000 francs playing baccarat against him, and is asked to pay. She writes on a check that she has no money to speak of, and Andre good-naturedly tears it up.

Then Andre spots Simone, who he is still in love with. Sally suggests that Andre pretending to be in love with someone else might draw a jealous Simone to him. He thinks that is an excellent plan; he chooses Sally, telling her that this is how she can repay her gambling debt. He instructs Sally to never let him be alone with Simone and to not let him weaken. When Simone tries to win him back, he introduces her to his "fiancée", Sally.

Andre keeps falling for Simone's enticements. But Sally is extremely persistent, going to outlandish lengths to keep him out of her rival's clutches. Finally, she socks him in the jaw to stop him from chasing after Simone. He reacts by pushing her clear into the next room, knocking her unconscious. This finally makes him realize whom he truly loves.

== Cast ==
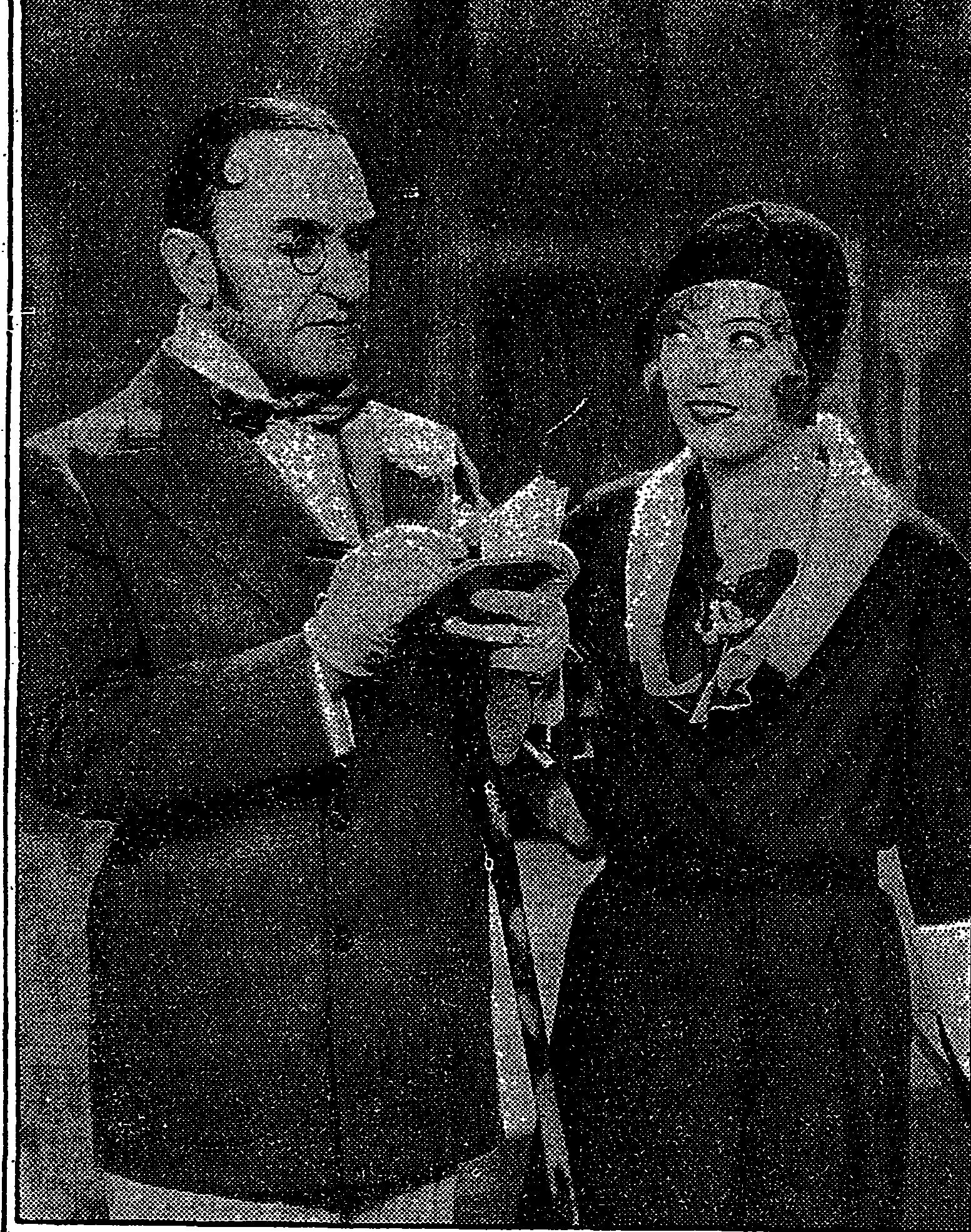
de Segurola as himself and Davies as Sally

- Marion Davies as Sally
- Jetta Goudal as Simone
- Nils Asther as Andre
- De Segurola as De Segurola
- Tenen Holtz as Albine
- Pepi Lederer as Peppy
- Carrie Daumery as Chaperon (uncredited)

== Production ==
Based on a Broadway play, the story was totally revamped by switching the genders of the three main characters. Purportedly, Davies' impersonation of Goudal had audiences refusing to believe it was really Davies. The production also featured Davies' niece Pepi Lederer in a small role as a tourist. Davies recalled that Goudal was a real pill and would only speak French on the set. This was another solid box-office hit for Davies.
