= Never Steal Anything Small =

1959 film by Charles Lederer

- Directed by: Charles Lederer
- Written by: Charles Lederer (Screen Story and Screenplay by)
- Based on: The Devil's Hornpipe by Maxwell Anderson and Rouben Mamoulian
- Produced by: Aaron Rosenberg
- Starring: James Cagney; Shirley Jones
- Cinematography: Harold Lipstein
- Edited by: Russell F. Schoengarth (as Russell Schoengarth)
- Color process: Eastmancolor
- Production company: Universal Pictures
- Distributed by: Universal Pictures
- Release date: February 11, 1959
- Running time: 94 minutes
- Country: United States
- Language: English

Never Steal Anything Small is a 1959 American CinemaScope comedy-drama musical film directed by Charles Lederer and starring James Cagney and Shirley Jones. It is based on the play The Devil's Hornpipe by Maxwell Anderson and Rouben Mamoulian.

== Plot ==
Jake Macllaney will do just about anything to win the presidential election of longshoreman union Local 26. When he encounters young upright attorney Dan Cabot and Cabot's attractive wife Linda, Macllaney breaks up their marriage, pursues Linda, and pins a grand larceny rap on Dan.

== Cast ==
- James Cagney as Jake Macllaney
- Shirley Jones as Linda Cabot
- Roger Smith as Dan Cabot
- Cara Williams as Winnipeg Simmons
- Nehemiah Persoff as Pinelli
- Royal Dano as Words Cannon
- Anthony Caruso as Lt. Tevis
- Horace McMahon as O.K. Merritt
- Virginia Vincent as Ginger
- Jack Albertson as Sleep-Out Charlie Barnes
- Robert J. Wilke as Lennie
- Herbie Faye as Hymie
- Billy M. Greene as Ed Barton
- Barry Russo as Ward (as John Duke)
- Jack Orrison as Osborne
- Roland Winters as Doctor
- Ingrid Goude as Model
- Sanford Seegar as Fats Ranney
- Edward McNally as Thomas (as Ed "Skipper" McNally)
- Gregg Barton as Deputy Warden
- Bruce Glover as Stevedore (uncredited)

== Production ==
Filmed in color, this musical was directed by Charles Lederer. It is about racketeers infiltrating the labor movement. Cagney plays a dishonest but charming union boss. This was Cagney's final musical film. Jones, who plays a happily married woman whom the labor leader wants to steal away, performs a lively musical number, spoofing television commercials. The film features a duet by Cagney and Williams on "I'm Sorry, I Want a Ferrari."

== See also ==
- List of American films of 1959
