= The Commuters =

1915 film by George Fitzmaurice

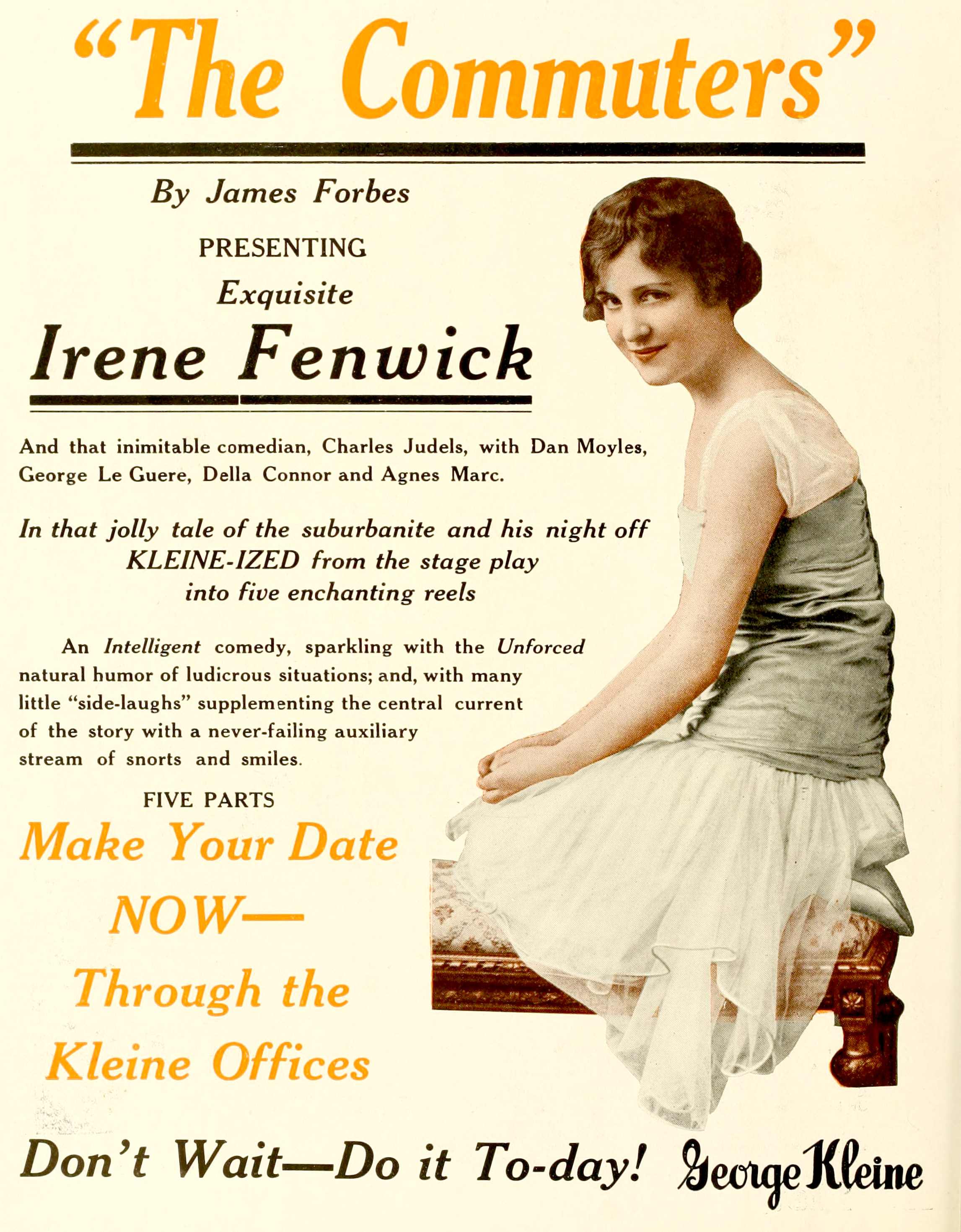
- Trade magazine advertisement
- Directed by: George Fitzmaurice
- Based on: The Commuters by James Forbes
- Produced by: George Kleine
- Starring: Irene Fenwick
- Distributed by: Kleine-Edison Services
- Release date: April 26, 1915
- Running time: 50 minutes; 5 reels
- Country: United States
- Language: Silent (English intertitles)

The Commuters is an extant 1915 American silent comedy film directed by George Fitzmaurice and starring Irene Fenwick in film debut. It is based on a 1910 Broadway play, The Commuters, by James Forbes.

A copy of the film is held in the Library of Congress collection.

== Cast ==
- Irene Fenwick as Hetty Brice
- Charles Judels as Professor Anatole Vermouth, aka Sammy
- George Le Guere as Larry Brice
- Dan Moyles as Mr. Rolliston
- Della Connor as Fan Rolliston, wife
- Agnes Marc as Carrie, A Maid
- Dan Crimmins as Policeman
- Marie Collins as The Mother-In-Law
