= Irene Fenwick =

American actress (1887–1936)

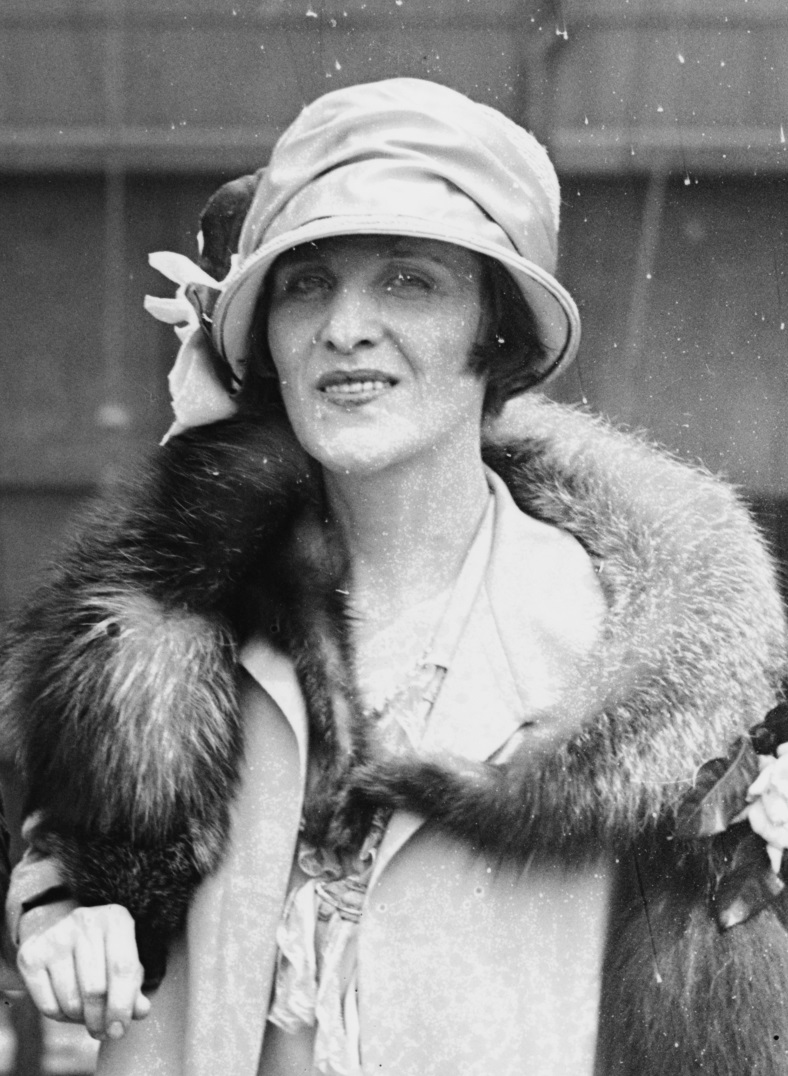
- Fenwick in 1923
- Born: Irene Frizell; September 5, 1887; Chicago, Illinois, U.S.
- Died: December 24, 1936 (aged 49); Beverly Hills, California, U.S.
- Occupation: Actress
- Spouses: Felix Isman (m. 1906; div. 1909); Jay O'Brien (m. 1918; div. 1923); Lionel Barrymore (m. 1923)
- Family: Barrymore

Irene Fenwick (born Irene Frizell; September 5, 1887 – December 24, 1936) was an American stage and silent film actress. She was married to Lionel Barrymore from 1923 until her death in 1936. Fenwick has several surviving feature films from her productions for the Kleine-Edison Feature Film Service, which also has numerous surviving shorts in the Library of Congress.

Years before marrying Lionel, Irene had dated Lionel's brother, John.

== Life ==
Frizell was born in Chicago and began acting in local theater. She had a few chorus roles in London, including one in a musical comedy that won critics praise for her "nearly natural performance". In New York she met Broadway producer Charles Frohman who gave her the stage name Fenwick and the ingénue role in The Brass Bottle (1910). A vivacious redhead, adept at both drama and comedy, she had a forceful stage presence that belied her tiny stature of 4'11". She continued on stage in 1912 opposite Douglas Fairbanks in Hawthorne of the U.S.A. The following year in the play The Family Cupboard, she was touted as a young actress with "the tact and intelligence of a veteran player".

While on Broadway, she started working in silent films with producer George Kleine. Fenwick often played wronged women and vamps in films such as The Sentimental Lady (1915), The Woman Next Door (1915), A Coney Island Princess (1916), with her performance as Princess Zim-Zim highlighted as the films "chief force", and The Sin Woman (1917). Fenwick felt restricted by these film roles and returned to the stage. In the hit plays The Claw (1921) and Laugh, Clown, Laugh (1923) she co-starred with Lionel Barrymore, whom she married on June 14, 1923, after a brief engagement. It was his second marriage and her third. She retired in 1926 after her husband chose a Hollywood career.

== Death ==
Fenwick died on Christmas Eve in 1936, at age 49 from complications of anorexia nervosa (called "overdieting" then). Barrymore was replaced by his brother John in his famous annual radio broadcast as Ebenezer Scrooge in A Christmas Carol for that year. He never remarried.

== Filmography ==
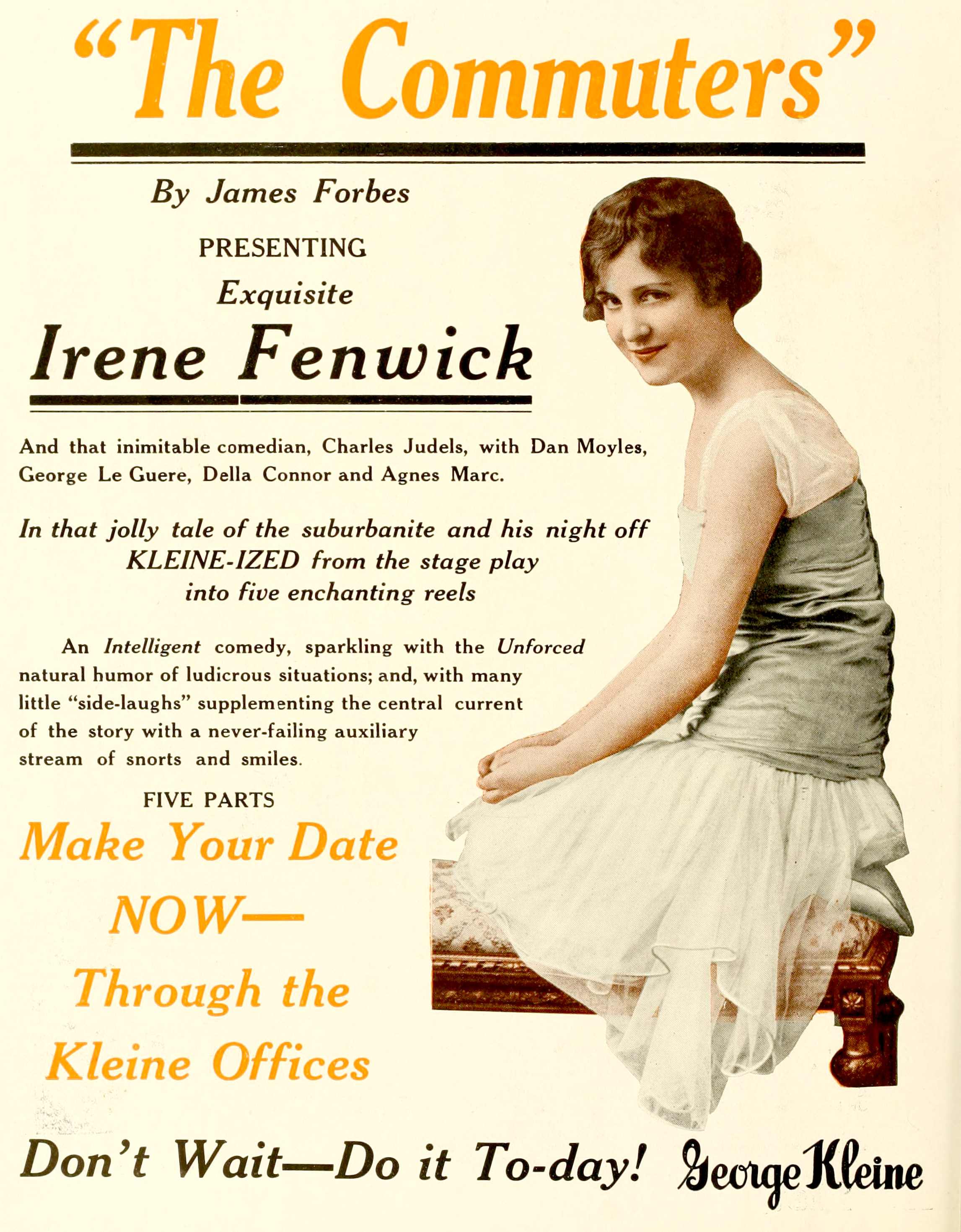
Fenwick in The Commuters (1915)

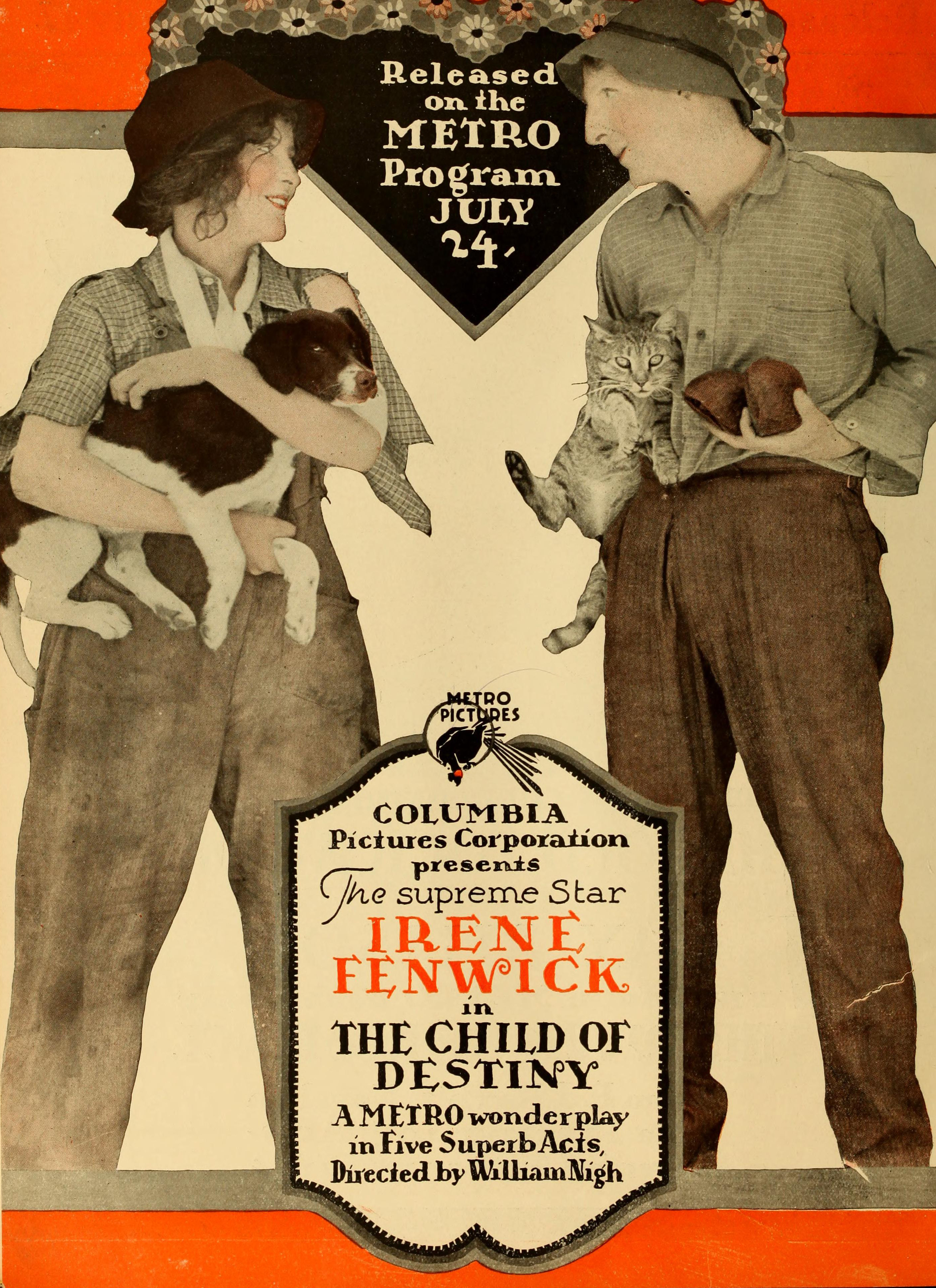
Movie poster for The Child of Destiny (1916)

Year	Film	Costar	Notes
1915	The Commuters		
1915	The Spendthrift		
1915	The Woman Next Door		Lost film
1915	The Green Cloak		
1915	The Sentimental Lady	John Davidson	
1916	The Child of Destiny		Lost film
1916	A Coney Island Princess	Owen Moore	Lost film
1917	A Girl Like That	Owen Moore	Lost film
1917	The Sin Woman	Clifford Bruce	Lost film
1917	National Red Cross Pageant		Lost film
