= Reine Davies =

American singer and actress

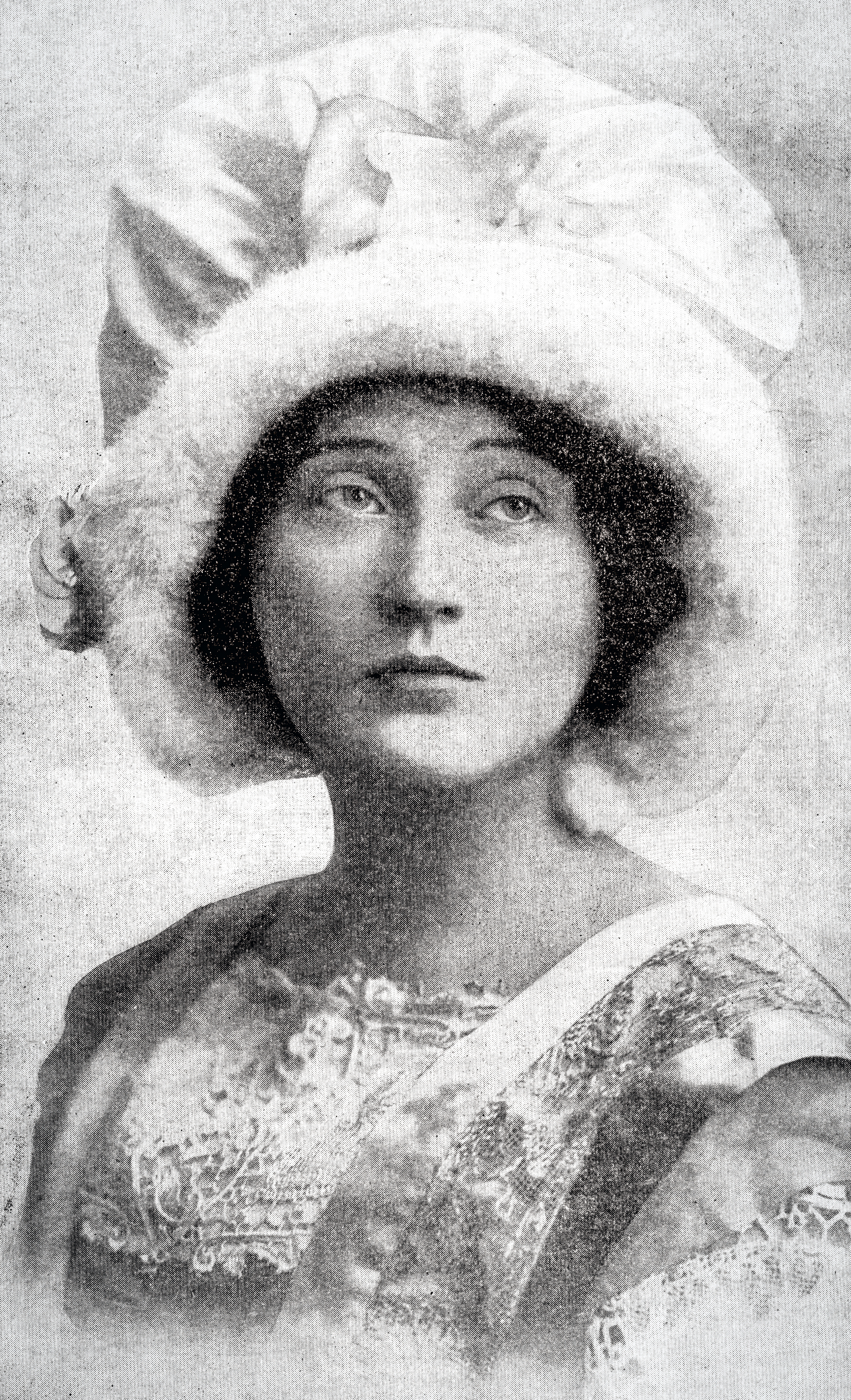
- Davies c. 1909
- Born: Irene Douras; June 6, 1883; Montclair, New Jersey, U.S.
- Died: April 2, 1938 (aged 54); Beverly Hills, California, U.S.
- Occupations: Singer, actress
- Spouses: George W. Lederer (m. 1907; div. 1912) George Regas (div. 1938)
- Children: Charles Lederer; Josephine Rose ("Pepi") Lederer
- Relatives: Marion Davies (sister); Rosemary Davies (sister); Patricia Lake (niece)

Reine Davies (born Irene Douras; June 6, 1883 – April 5, 1938) was an American singer and actress.

== Life and career ==
Davies was born on June 6, 1883, in Brooklyn, New York, the daughter of Bernard J. Douras, a lawyer and judge in New York City; and Rose Reilly. Her father performed the civil marriage of socialite Gloria Gould Bishop.

The eldest sister of actress Marion Davies, Reine was the first of the three Douras daughters to adopt the name Davies. One day she was driving through a Brooklyn neighborhood, when she saw an office sign for Valentine Davies. She liked the name so much, she adopted it professionally, and her sisters followed suit.

Davies married twice, first to director George Lederer from January 12, 1908 until they divorced in 1912, and later to actor George Regas. She had two children with Lederer, son director/writer Charles Lederer, and daughter, Josephine Rose ("Pepi") Lederer.

She was known as "The New American Beauty," and, by her friends as, "The True Blue Girl". Reine Davies lived for many years in Chicago, and was on the Vaudeville circuit as a singer and actress. She appeared in the 1915 movie Sunday as Sunday and in 1917 as Beth Winthrop in The Sin Woman. She was also a popular subject on sheet music covers, most famously for "Meet Me Tonight in Dreamland" (which she introduced), as well as "The Reine Waltz" (1910), "When I Kissed Your Tears Away" (1911), "Leaf by Leaf the Roses Fall" (1911), "When I Met You Last Night in Dreamland" (1912), "In the Palace of Dreams" (1914), and "Araby" (1915). For many years she edited the gossip column in the Los Angeles Examiner.

In 1935, Davies began writing a column about Hollywood social events for The San Francisco Examiner.

Davies died on April 5, 1938, in Beverly Hills, California, from a heart attack in a swimming pool. She was buried with a Requiem Mass at St. Augustine's Church in Culver City, California, and interred in the Douras Mausoleum in what is now Hollywood Forever Cemetery.

== See also ==
- 1883 in film
