= The Front Page (1931 film) =

1931 film

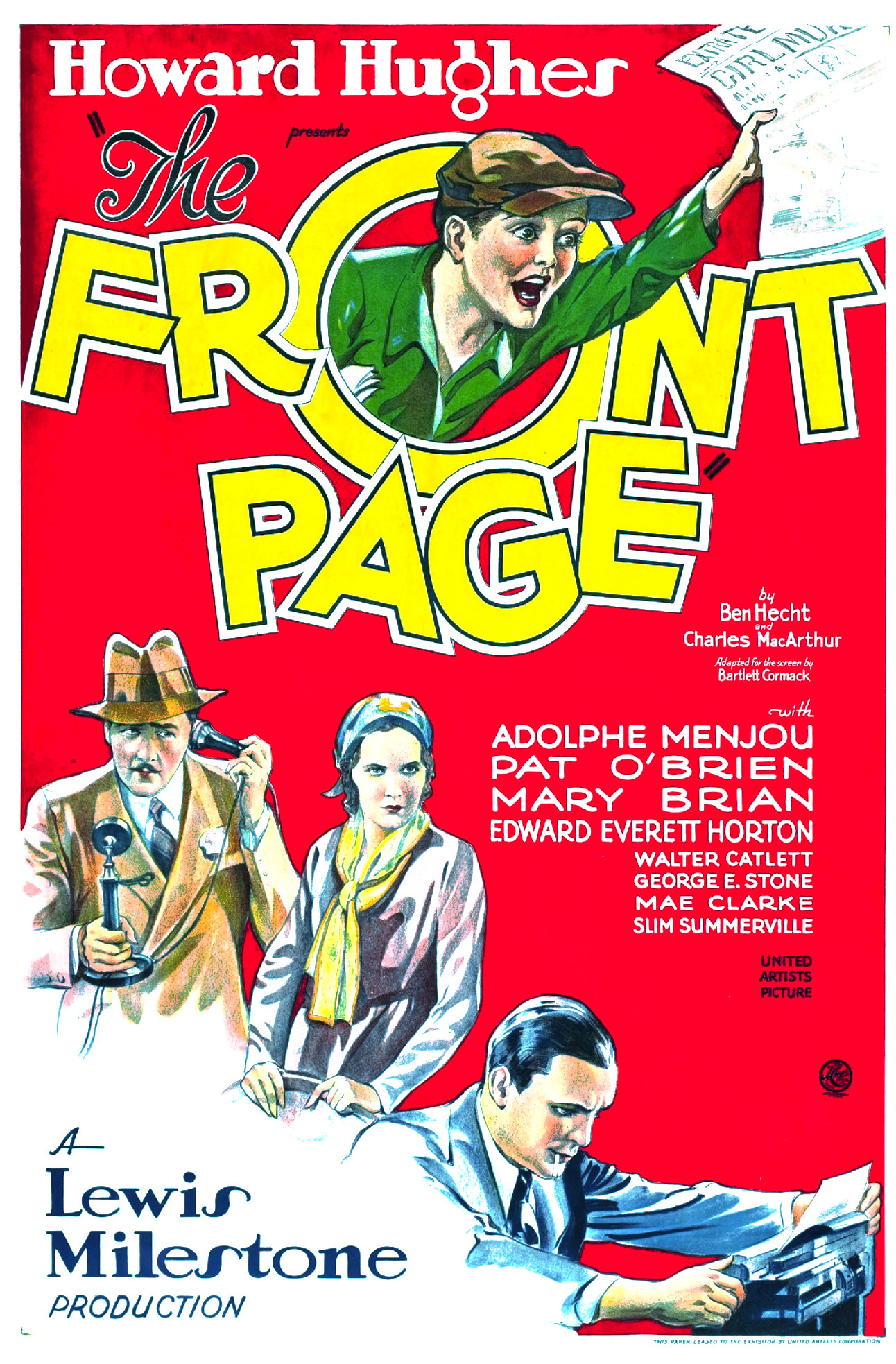
- Directed by: Lewis Milestone
- Screenplay by: Bartlett Cormack; Charles Lederer
- Based on: The Front Page; 1928 play by Ben Hecht; Charles MacArthur
- Produced by: Lewis Milestone; Howard Hughes
- Starring: Adolphe Menjou; Pat O'Brien; Mary Brian; Edward Everett Horton
- Cinematography: Glen MacWilliams
- Edited by: W. Duncan Mansfield
- Color process: Black and white
- Production company: The Caddo Company
- Distributed by: United Artists
- Release date: April 4, 1931
- Running time: 101 minutes
- Country: United States
- Language: English
- Box office: $700,000

The Front Page is a 1931 American pre-Code screwball black comedy film directed by Lewis Milestone and starring Adolphe Menjou and Pat O'Brien. Based on the 1928 Broadway play of the same name by Ben Hecht and Charles MacArthur, the film was produced by Howard Hughes, written by Bartlett Cormack and Charles Lederer, and distributed by United Artists. The supporting cast includes Mary Brian, Edward Everett Horton, Walter Catlett, George E. Stone, Mae Clarke, Slim Summerville, and Matt Moore. At the 4th Academy Awards, the film was nominated for Best Picture, Milestone for Best Director, and Menjou for Best Actor.

In 2010, this film was selected for preservation in the United States National Film Registry by the Library of Congress as being "culturally, historically, or aesthetically significant". The film is in the public domain. The February 2020 issue of New York Magazine lists The Front Page as among "The Best Movies That Lost Best Picture at the Oscars."

Two versions of the film exist, each made up of different takes, one for the international market and director Lewis Milestone's preferred version for its original U.S. domestic release. Both versions are available on home video.

In the film when the sheriff asks who threw a bucket out the window, Walter Catlett's character replies: "Judge Mankiewicz threw it," a reference to Hecht's friend Herman J. Mankiewicz.

== Plot ==
The full film

In an unnamed large city with multiple daily newspapers, star reporter Hildebrand "Hildy" Johnson and his Morning Post editor, Walter Burns, hope to cash in on a big story involving an escaped convicted murderer, Earl Williams. Williams is scheduled to go to the gallows at 7 o'clock the following morning for an anarchist-related murder of a black policeman. Esteemed newspaperman Johnson is about to quit the journalism trade and is on his way to marry his sweetheart Peggy Grant and relocate to New York City where an advertising job awaits him. Not surprisingly, his unscrupulous boss Burns does not want him to quit. He wants Johnson to remain on his staff so he can cover the major news story for the Morning Post.

Although he is an avowed anarchist, it is revealed that Williams is likely an innocent man who has been wrongly convicted of the policeman's murder due to rising anti-red sentiments in his city.

Accordingly, Burns will do anything to make sure Johnson works on that angle of the story — including delaying his wedding trip. Hours before Williams' scheduled execution, while being interviewed by an Austrian alienist and reenacting the murder, Williams manages to escape custody with the help of Sheriff Pinky Hartman's gun which the inept lawman had carelessly loaned to the doctor. With the assistance of Johnson and Burns, the newspapermen hide the fleeing Williams in a rolltop desk in a room usually occupied by a bevy of newspaper reporters gathered to cover Williams' execution. Johnson's soon-to-be mother-in-law, Mrs. Grant, sees Johnson and Burns hide Williams in the desk. To silence her, Burns has some of his cronies roughly escort her out of the building.

Sheriff Hartman and the mayor of the city get a missive from the governor. It is a reprieve for Williams. However, Williams' execution would be a political boon for the two men in an upcoming election, so they refuse to accept it. Instead, they send the messenger away with a bribe and the address of a house of ill repute. Johnson's future mother-in-law eventually returns to the press room and Williams is found in the desk. The reporters all rush to call bulletins into their editors, each with widely varying and greatly exaggerated details about how the fugitive Williams was re-arrested.

Johnson and Burns are about to be arrested by Sheriff Hartman for aiding a fleeing criminal and kidnapping Mrs. Grant when the messenger from the governor reappears. Saying he is happily married and his conscience cannot let him accept the bribe, he tells the reporters about the politicians' refusal to accept the governor's pardon for Williams. The politicians quickly agree to drop their charges against the reporters in exchange for them not mentioning their own wrongdoings in the newspapers.

Despite offers of a promotion at the Morning Post from Burns, Johnson says he is retiring from the newspaper business to go on his wedding trip. Burns seems to accept Johnson's career decision gracefully, even giving Johnson his prized gold watch as a thank-you gift for his services as a star reporter for the Morning Post. However, moments after Johnson and Mary depart for the railroad station, Burns arranges for the police to arrest Johnson at the train's first stop on the pretense that Johnson has stolen his watch.

== Cast ==
- Adolphe Menjou as Walter Burns
- Pat O'Brien as Hildebrand "Hildy" Johnson
- Mary Brian as Peggy Grant
- Edward Everett Horton as Roy V. Bensinger
- Walter Catlett as Jimmy Murphy
- George E. Stone as Earl Williams
- Mae Clarke as Molly Malloy
- Slim Summerville as Irving Pincus
- Matt Moore as Ernie Kruger
- Frank McHugh as "Mac" McCue
- Clarence Wilson as Sheriff Peter B. "Pinky" Hartman
- Fred Howard as Schwartz
- Phil Tead as Wilson
- Eugene Strong as Endicott
- Spencer Charters as Woodenshoes
- Maurice Black as Diamond Louie
- Effie Ellsler as Mrs Grant
- Dorothea Wolbert as Jenny
- James Gordon as Fred, the Mayor
- Richard Alexander as Jacobi (uncredited)

== Critical response ==
Leslie Halliwell gave it three of four stars: "Brilliant early talkie perfectly transferring into screen terms a stage classic of the twenties. Superficially a shade primitive now, its essential power remains." Leonard Maltin in his Movie Guide was enthusiastic: "First filming of Hecht-MacArthur play is forceful, funny, and flamboyantly directed." Eddie Muller wrote: "This perfectly noir premise was delivered as uproarious comedy, thanks to Hecht and MacArthur's ribald rat-a-tat dialogue, which instantly created a new American archetype—the fast-talking, hard-drinking newshound who'll do anything for a scoop."

== Preservation ==
The Front Page was preserved by the Academy Film Archive in 2016.

== Adaptations ==
In addition to this film, the play has been adapted on several other occasions. CBS radio turned it into a one-hour June 28, 1937 episode of Lux Radio Theatre with Walter Winchell and James Gleason, and a half-hour June 22, 1946 episode of Academy Award Theater with O'Brien and Menjou reprising their original roles. NBC radio ran a one-hour May 9, 1948 episode of the Ford Theater starring Ed Begley and Everett Sloane.

The story was adapted for Howard Hawks's comedy His Girl Friday (1940), in which Hildy was recast as a woman played by Rosalind Russell, the ex-wife of Walter (Cary Grant), giving the story a romantic spin. There was also a 1974 remake of The Front Page starring Jack Lemmon and Walter Matthau; and another version was made as Switching Channels (1988) with Burt Reynolds, Kathleen Turner and Christopher Reeve.

== See also ==
- List of films in the public domain in the United States
