= Patricia Lake =

American actress (1919–1993)

- Lake in 1940s
- Born: Patricia Douras Van Cleve; June 8, 1919 near Paris, France
- Died: October 3, 1993 (aged 74); Rancho Mirage, California, U.S.
- Resting place: Douras Mausoleum, Hollywood Forever Cemetery
- Other names: Patricia Van Cleve; Patricia Lake
- Occupations: Actress; comedian
- Spouse: Arthur Lake (m. 1937; died 1987)
- Children: 2
- Parent(s): Of record: George Van Cleve; Rosemary Douras; Alleged: William Randolph Hearst; Marion Davies
- Relatives: Reine Davies (aunt); Charles Lederer (cousin); Pepi Lederer (cousin)
- Awards: MPAA "Baby Star", 1940

Patricia Douras Van Cleve (June 8, 1919 – October 3, 1993), known as Patricia Lake, was an American actress and radio comedian. Presented as the niece of actress Marion Davies, she was long suspected of being her natural daughter, fathered by publishing magnate William Randolph Hearst. Lake acknowledged this relationship shortly before she died.

== Parentage ==
She was born in a hospital outside Paris, France. Her date of birth is not known; according to her Los Angeles Times obituary, "The year was sometime between 1920 and 1923; Lake never knew exactly." The Social Security Death Index states she was born June 8, 1919.

In the 1920s, speculation arose that Lake was the child of Hearst and Davies, who had carried on a public affair since 1917. Hearst never divorced his wife, Millicent Willson, whom he married in 1903, but the couple maintained separate lives.

Many reference books say that Lake's parents were Marion Davies' sister Rose and her first husband, George Van Cleve. The Lake family asserted that the newborn was given to Davies' sister, whose own child had died in infancy. The dead child's birth certificate was reportedly altered to support the deception. CBS News reported that Hearst acknowledged to Lake on her wedding day that he was her father.

According to Magazine Americana, published by the Institute for the Study of American Popular Culture, after Rose and George Van Cleeve had separated, he kidnapped Patricia in 1924 and went into hiding. Hearst's detectives located the pair after five years and the girl was returned to Rose's custody. She was returned to Van Cleeve's custody after a court decision.

Patricia attended Lawlor Professional School in Hollywood. The Lake family asserts that when Patricia lived with the Van Cleeves, Hearst paid the bills and arranged for her education at schools in New York and Boston.

Hearst and Davies reportedly took Patricia on trips to Europe and spent time with her. Lake spent considerable time at Hearst's San Simeon estate, is included in most home movies of Hearst and Davies, and accompanied them on many trips. Introduced as Marion Davies' niece, Lake socialized with such notables as Clark Gable, Jean Harlow, Charlie Chaplin and Gloria Swanson. Lake lived with Marion Davies for the major portion of her life, and Hearst financially supported Lake all of her life. After Lake's marriage, Davies continued to support both Patricia and her husband Arthur. When Davies died in 1961, half of her $20 million estate was left to Lake as an inheritance.

Her features, "suspiciously similar" to those of Hearst, did not go unnoticed. Lake never made any public comment on the subject, even after the deaths of Hearst and Davies. Lake's son said that hours before her death in 1993, she confirmed and asked her family to publish the identities of her biological parents.

== Marriage ==
Patricia first met actor Arthur Lake when he was visiting at Marion Davies's beach house. They married in 1937 at Hearst's San Simeon estate. Davies and Hearst jointly gave her away at the marriage ceremony. (This would have made her 13 or 14 years old at the time of her marriage if she was born in 1923; 17 or 18 if born in 1919.) Patricia and Arthur remained married for nearly 50 years until his death in January 1987. They had two children: Arthur Patrick Lake (Arthur Lake Jr.) (born March 1, 1943), and Marion Rose Lake (born October 6, 1944).

Both Patricia and her husband are interred in the same crypt as Marion Davies at the Hollywood Forever Cemetery.

== Career ==
Lake performed in theater during the late 1930s through the mid-1940s. When, after seven years, Penny Singleton left the radio sitcom Blondie in the mid-1940s, Lake replaced her as the voice of Blondie Bumstead for the remaining five years of the show, opposite her real-life husband Arthur Lake, who played Blondie's spouse, Dagwood. In 1954, Lake also co-starred with her husband in an early television sitcom he created called Meet the Family.

Lake was selected by the Motion Picture Publicists Association to be one of the MPPA 'Baby Stars' of 1940, an award similar to the WAMPAS Baby Stars selections of 1922 through 1934.
