= Patricia Lake (Wisconsin) =

- Location within Wisconsin Location within the United States
- Location: Oneida County and Vilas County, Wisconsin
- Coordinates: 45.878564°N 89.750704°W
- Type: Seepage lake
- Basin countries: United States
- Surface area: 32 acres (0.13 km^{2})
- Max. depth: 23 ft (7.0 m)

Patricia Lake is a 32-acre, spring-fed seepage lake close to the town of Minocqua, Oneida County, Wisconsin, United States. It is located on the border between Oneida and Vilas counties, just south of Wisconsin Highway 70 and northwest of Kawaguesaga Lake.

The lake has no public access and boats with gasoline engines are prohibited. It has a maximum depth of 23 feet, and bluegill, northern pike and largemouth bass can be caught.

There is a small residential development on the northwest shore of the lake, and houses on the north and the eastern sides. Norwood Pines supper club serves food on a screened deck over the lake. On the southwest shore lies Patricia Lake Campground & RV Park. Pine Hill Resort lies to the southeast of the lake, on the shores of the adjacent Kawaguesaga Lake.
