= Rosemary Davies =

American actress

- Born: Rose Douras; June 8, 1895; Brooklyn, New York, U.S.
- Died: September 20, 1963 (aged 68); Los Angeles, California, U.S.
- Occupation: Actress
- Spouse(s): George Van Cleve (divorced); Louis Adlon (died 1947)
- Children: Patricia Lake (legal)
- Relatives: Marion Davies (sister); Reine Davies (sister)

Rosemary Davies (born Rose Douras; June 8, 1895 – September 20, 1963) was an American actress.

== Life ==
Davies was born Rose Douras in Brooklyn, New York. Her father, Bernard Douras, was a magistrate in New York and later was an attorney in Hollywood. He and her mother, Rose C. Douras, had four daughters.

Davies was the sister of actresses Marion Davies and Reine Davies, but never reached the same level of fame as her two sisters. However, Rose Davies' name was mentioned in different circles when she was said to be the mother of Patricia Lake by her first husband, George Barnes Van Cleve. After Patricia Lake's death, her family announced that Lake was in fact the daughter of Marion Davies and William Randolph Hearst, born secretly during a trip abroad between 1920 and 1923.

Davies began her career as a chorus girl. Although she had little film experience, she was selected to play the title role in the film Alice (The Mad Marriage), which began production in 1924.

== Personal life and death ==
Davies was divorced from George B. Van Cleve in 1928. She had a daughter. Davies married Louis Adlon who was a German-born American motion picture actor. He died March 31, 1947. Newspaper publisher Edward Beale McLean considered Davies "my common-law wife", referring to her in that way in one of his wills. A later will, filed in the week following McLean's death in 1941, left $100,000 to Davies in addition to having most of his estate put in trust for her. McLean had planned to marry Davies in 1931. Papers filed during proceedings to divorce his wife included "a formal statement that he intends to marry Miss Rose Douras".

She died in 1963 in Bel Air, California. She is buried beside her sister Marion in the Douras mausoleum with Marion's husband Horace Brown, Patricia Lake, and Lake's husband, actor Arthur Lake.
