= George Lederer =

American producer and director (1861-1938)

George Washington Lederer
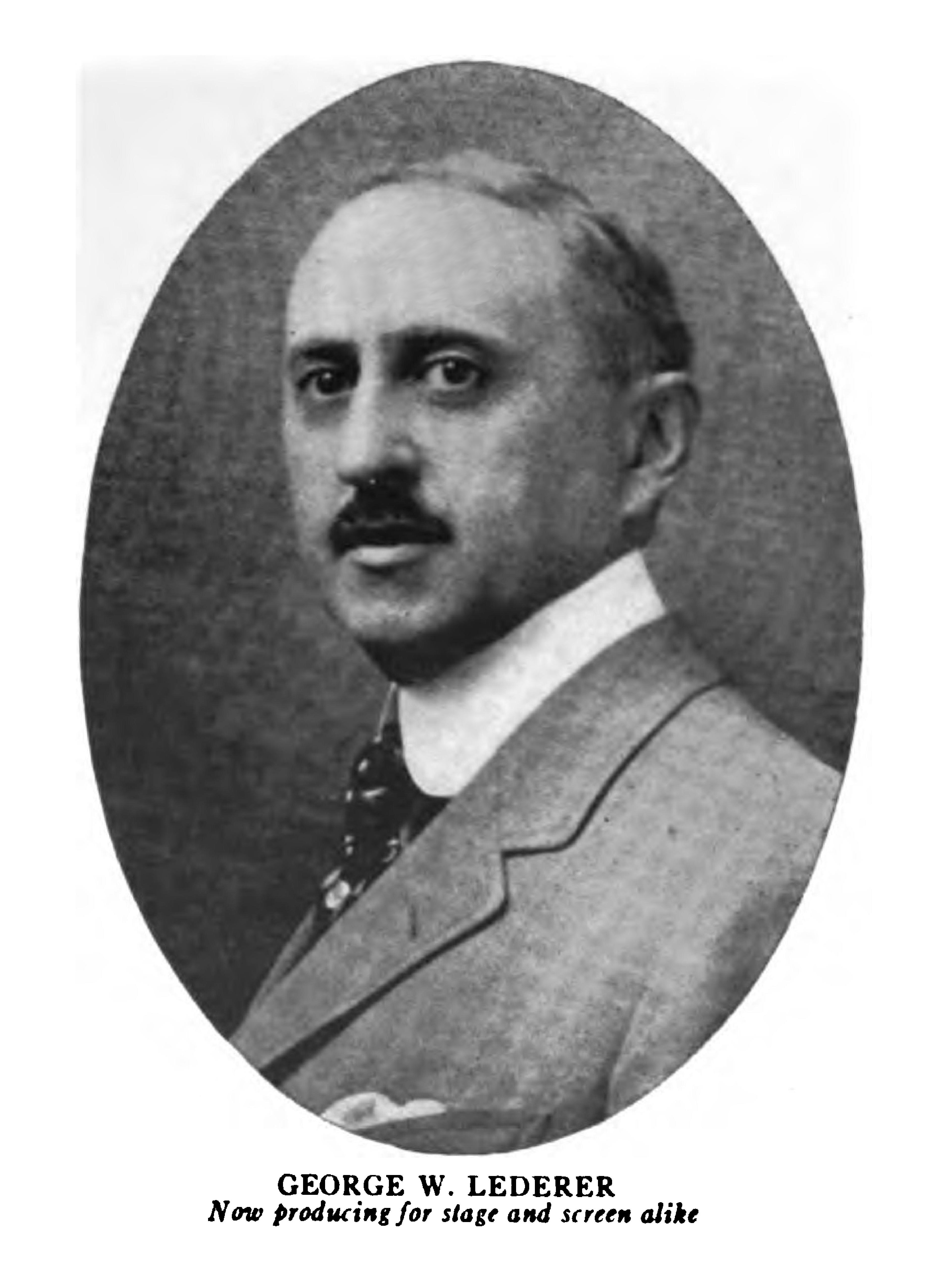
- George W. Lederer, 1914 or earlier
- Born: 1861; Wilkes-Barre, Pennsylvania, United States
- Died: October 8, 1938 (aged 76–77)
- Occupation: Broadway producer & director
- Spouse(s): Ida Florine Newcombe (m. 1889; div. 1894) Adele Rice (m. 1894; div. 1906) Reine Davies (m. 1908; div. 1912) Jesse Lewis
- Children: 6, including George W. Lederer, Maitland Rice Lederer, Pepi Lederer, Charles Lederer; Gloria Lederer, Geraldine Lederer

George Washington Lederer (1861 in Wilkes-Barre, Pennsylvania − October 8, 1938) was an American producer and director on Broadway from 1894 to 1931. He was the husband of actresses Reine Davies and Jessie Lewis and the father of Charles Lederer, Pepi Lederer, Glory Lederer and Geraldine Lederer.

== Biography ==
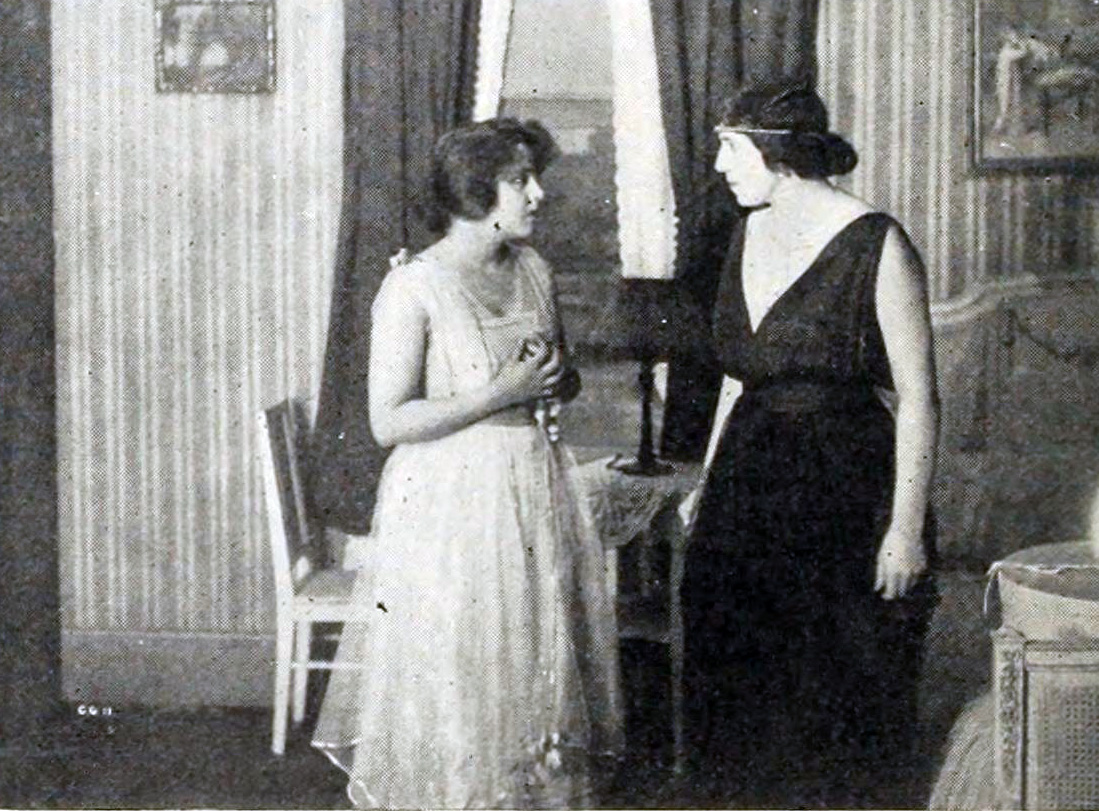
The Decoy (1916), one of the motion pictures directed by George Lederer

Born to a Jewish family, Lederer began his career when he joined a touring opera company at age 13, as a soprano singer. When he reached the age of 17, he collaborated with the producer Thomas Canary and leased the Casino Theatre, in New York City. In 1897, at age 25, he produced the musical The Belle of New York, which became one of the first American musicals to enjoy enduring success in England, where it ran for over two years.

Lederer was one of the first producers of musical Revues in the U.S., when together with Sydney Rosenfeld, he presented The Passing Show in 1894. In 1903, while he was manager of the New York Theatre he presented the all-black musical In Dahomey, with music by Will Marion Cook and lyrics by poet Paul Dunbar. It starred the prominent black vaudeville team of Bert Williams and George Walker. Then crossing the Atlantic, it played for seven months, and received a Royal Command Performance at Buckingham Palace in England. The cakewalk dance, a highlight of the show, became the rage of the town.

He was married on October 19, 1889, to Ida Florine Newcombe, with whom he had a son, George W. Lederer Jr. (1891–1924), who became a theatre manager and press agent before dying aged 33. He was divorced from Newcombe and married to Adele Rice on the same day in November, 1894. Their son Maitland Rice Lederer became a motion picture executive. He and Rice were divorced in 1906, and he married actress Reine Davies in January, 1907. Their daughter Josephine Rose "Pepi" Lederer became a film actress, and son Charles Lederer became a screenwriter. He later married Jessie Lewis, with whom he had two daughters, Glory and Geraldine.
