= 1911 in Ireland =

- Centuries: 18th; 19th; 20th; 21st
- Decades: 1890s; 1900s; 1910s; 1920s; 1930s
- See also: 1911 in the United Kingdom; Other events of 1911; List of years in Ireland

Events in the year 1911 in Ireland.

== Events ==
- 5 January – Protestant church leaders condemned the Ne Temere Papal decree on mixed marriages.
- 2 April – The national population census was taken.
- 16 May – The Cunard Line's SS Ivernia struck a rock on entering Queenstown harbour.
- 27 May – The first issue of the Irish Worker was published. The paper was the official organ of the Irish Transport and General Workers' Union (ITGWU) and was edited by James Larkin.
- 31 May – The RMS Titanic's hull was launched at the Harland & Wolff shipyard in Belfast. It was the largest ship afloat. Her sister RMS Olympic sailed for Liverpool the same day to take up transatlantic service.
- 22 June – As George V was crowned King in London a Sinn Féin meeting at the Customs House in Dublin condemned Irish participation in the coronation ceremonies.
- 8–12 July – King George V and Queen Mary made a five-day royal visit to Dublin which was the last to the city this century. On 8 July, they officially open the College of Science in Merrion Square and on 10 July they visited St Patrick's College, Maynooth.
- 9 August – A statue of Charles Stewart Parnell was hoisted onto its pedestal in Sackville Street, Dublin.
- 17 August – Dublin County Council voted in favour of using Greenwich Mean Time. The councillors heard that Irish time, being 25 minutes behind Greenwich, was a great handicap for trade.
- 18 August – The Parliament Act removed the House of Lords' power regarding budgets and restricted their power over other bills to a two-year suspensive veto. This made Irish Home Rule a possibility in the future.
- 21 August – The Irish Women's Suffrage Federation was founded.
- 26 August – Wexford foundry workers were locked out for attempting to join the ITGWU. The lockout continued until February 1912.
- 23 September – 70,000 Unionists and Orangemen marched from Belfast to Craigavon House to protest against Home Rule.
- 1 October – The Parnell Monument was officially unveiled in Upper Sackville Street, Dublin
  Full date unknown
  - A strike of women workers at Jacob's biscuit factory in Dublin was organised by Rosie Hackett.
  - The organisation Royal Arch Purple was formed, closely linked to the Orange Institution.
  - Bellevue Pleasure Gardens, a public park and recreational area, was opened on the slopes of Cavehill in Belfast.
  - December – The Association of Loyal Orangewomen of Ireland is reformed in County Cavan.
  - Sir Samuel Kelly founded his family coal merchant business as a limited company with a capital of £50,000, as John Kelly Limited.

== Arts and literature ==
- 16 April – St. John Greer Ervine's play Mixed Marriage premiered at the Abbey Theatre in Dublin.
- 16 December – The Imperial Copyright Act (coming into effect in 1912) confirmed the library of Trinity College Dublin as one of the six in the UK entitled to be given by legal deposit a copy of every British publication.
- The Kalem Company of New York shot a film based on the play The Colleen Bawn on location in Ireland with Canadian Irish director Sidney Olcott. (Another version was shot this year in Australia.)
- Patrick MacGill's Songs of a Navvy was published.
- Adam Lynn's Ulster Scots dialect Random Rhymes frae Cullybackey was published.
- W. F. Marshall's poems Ulster Sails West, including "Hi Uncle Sam!", was published.
- The first volume, Ave, of novelist George Moore's three-volume autobiographical Hail and Farewell was published in the same year that he left Dublin to settle in London.
- Katharine Tynan Hinkson's New Poems was published.

== Sport ==
=== Association football ===
- International
  - 28 January – Ireland 1–2 Wales (in Belfast)
  - 11 February – England 2–2 Ireland (in Derby)
  - 18 March – Scotland 2–0 Ireland (in Glasgow)
- Irish League
  - Winners: Linfield F.C.
- Irish Cup
  - Winners: Shelbourne F.C. 0 – 0, 2 – 1 Bohemian F.C.
- Glenavon F.C. joined the Irish Football League, replacing Bohemian F.C. who had resigned from the League, but returned next year.

=== Gaelic Games ===
- All-Ireland Senior Football Championship 1911 Winners: Cork
- All-Ireland Senior Hurling Championship 1911 Winners: Kilkenny
- Meath were declared Leinster football champions for 20 minutes, but when Kilkenny arrived late for the final, Meath agreed to play the match and were beaten.

=== Golf ===
- Cliftonville Golf Club was founded in Belfast.

=== Rugby ===
- 11 February – Ireland beat England by one try to nil at the first Rugby Union international of the season at Lansdowne Road.

== Births ==
- 31 January – Eddie Byrne, actor (died 1981).
- 3 February – Tom Davis, association football player (died 1987).
- 4 February – Jimmy Walsh, Kilkenny hurler (died 1977).
- 12 February – Cearbhall Ó Dálaigh, Attorney-General, Chief Justice of Ireland and fifth President of Ireland (died 1978).
- 28 February – Denis Parsons Burkitt, surgeon (died 1993).
- 5 March – Joseph Tomelty, actor, novelist, and playwright (died 1995).
- 5 May – James Horan, Roman Catholic monsignor, conceived and created Ireland West Airport (died 1986).
- 17 May – Maureen O'Sullivan, actress (died 1998).
- 27 July – Donal Lamont, Catholic Bishop in Rhodesia (died 2003).
- 29 July – Harold Marcus Ervine-Andrews, soldier, recipient of the Victoria Cross for gallantry in 1940 near Dunkirk in France (died 1995).
- 8 August – Billy Behan, association football player and football scout (died 1991).
- 18 September – Brinsley Trench, 8th Earl of Clancarty, ufologist and politician (died 1995).
- 24 September – James Gill, cricketer (died 2000).
- 5 October – Brian O'Nolan, also known as Myles na gCopaleen, novelist, satirist, and humourist (died 1966).
- 11 October – Fred Daly, golfer (died 1990).
- 19 October – John de Courcy Ireland, maritime historian and political activist (died 2006).
- 26 December – John 'Tull' Dunne, Gaelic footballer, coach and administrator (died 1990).
- Full date unknown – Jimmy Kelly, association football player (died 1970).

== Deaths ==
- 3 February – Robert Tressell, writer and author of The Ragged Trousered Philanthropists (born 1870).
- 1 August – Dudley Stagpoole, soldier, recipient of the Victoria Cross for gallantry in 1863 in New Zealand (born 1838).
- 16 August – Patrick Francis Moran, third Archbishop of Sydney (born 1830).
- 5 September – Katherine Cecil Thurston, novelist (born 1875).
- 23 September – Daniel O'Reilly, U.S. Representative from New York (born 1838).

== See also ==
- 1911 in Scotland
- 1911 in Wales
