= The Colleen Bawn (disambiguation) =

The Colleen Bawn is an 1860 Irish play by Dion Boucicault.

The Colleen Bawn may also refer to:

- local nickname of Ellen Scanlan (1803–1819), Irish murder victim who was the inspiration of the play and its film adaptations:
  - The Colleen Bawn (1911 American film), directed by Sidney Olcott
  - The Colleen Bawn (1911 Australian film), directed by Gaston Mervale
  - The Colleen Bawn (1924 film), a British production directed by W.P. Kellino

== See also ==
- Colleen Bawn, a town in Zimbabwe
- TSS Colleen Bawn, a passenger steamship
