= List of films based on actual events (before 1940) =

This is a list of films and miniseries that are based on actual events. All films on this list are from American production unless indicated otherwise.

Not all films have remained true to the genuine history of the event or the characters they are portraying, often adding action and drama to increase the substance and popularity of the film. This list should only include films supported by a Wikipedia article.

== 1890s ==
- The Execution of Mary Stuart (1895) – historical short film portraying the execution of Mary, Queen of Scots
- The Dreyfus Affair (French: L'affaire Dreyfus) (1899) – French biographical short film reconstructing episodes from the trial of Alfred Dreyfus
- King John (1899) – British drama short film about the life of John, King of England
- Major Wilson's Last Stand (1899) – British silent short war film dramatizing the final engagement of the Shangani Patrol and the death of Major Allan Wilson and his men in Rhodesia in 1893

== 1900s ==
- Attack on a China Mission (1900) – British silent drama film depicting the Boxer Rebellion, which began in the early months of 1900
- Joan of Arc (French: Jeanne d'Arc) (1900) – French silent film based on the life of Joan of Arc
- Capital Execution (Danish: Henrettelsen) (1903) – Danish silent film telling the true story of a French woman who is condemned to death for killing her two children
- Dingjun Mountain (Mandarin: 定軍山) (1905) – Chinese historical film depicting a dramatized account of Battle of Mount Dingjun (219 AD)
- The Story of the Kelly Gang (1906) – Australian bushranger film following the life of the legendary bushranger Ned Kelly, often cited as the first full-length feature film
- Eureka Stockade (1907) – Australian silent film about the Eureka Rebellion
- The Unwritten Law (1907) – crime drama film, about Harry Kendall Thaw's killing of Stanford White over his involvement with model and actress Evelyn Nesbit.
- Antony and Cleopatra (1908) – historical film based on the play of the same name by William Shakespeare, dramatizing the ill-fated romance between Mark Antony and Cleopatra VII of Egypt
- The Assassination of the Duke of Guise (French: La Mort du duc de Guise) (1908) – French historical film about the murder of Henry I, Duke of Guise, in 1588
- The Boston Tea Party (1908) – silent historical drama film about the Boston Tea Party of 1773
- The Last Days of Pompeii (Italian: Gli ultimi giorni di Pompeii) (1908) – Italian historical drama film about the cataclysmic destruction of the city of Pompeii by the eruption of Mount Vesuvius in AD 79
- Macbeth (1908) – historical drama film based on the William Shakespeare play of the same name about Macbeth, King of Scotland
- The Reprieve: An Episode in the Life of Abraham Lincoln (1908) – biographical film based on the life of Abraham Lincoln
- Edgar Allen Poe (1909) – silent drama film focusing on Edgar Allan Poe and his wife Virginia Clemm, who is bedridden and seriously ill
- The Life of Moses (1909) – silent epic christian film telling the story of the life of Moses
- Macbeth (1909) – French historical drama film based on the William Shakespeare play of the same name about Macbeth, King of Scotland
- Macbeth (1909) – Italian historical drama film based on the William Shakespeare play of the same name about Macbeth, King of Scotland

== 1910s ==
=== 1910 ===
- Abraham Lincoln's Clemency (1910) – historical film revolving around US President Abraham Lincoln pardoning a hapless sentry who had fallen asleep while on duty during the height of the American Civil War
- Davy Crockett (1910) – silent Western film loosely based on the frontiersman Davy Crockett
- Peg Woffington (1910) – silent historical film about the actress Peg Woffington
- Peter the Great (Russian: Pyotr Velikiy) (1910) – Russian short film showing the main events in the life of Peter the Great
- Pocahontas (1910) – silent drama film depicting a retelling of the well-known story of Pocahontas

=== 1911 ===
- The Colleen Bawn (1911) – romantic drama film based on the actual 1819 murder of 15-year-old Ellen Scanlan
- The Colleen Bawn (1911) – Australian romantic drama film based on the actual 1819 murder of 15-year-old Ellen Scanlan
- Defence of Sevastopol (Russian: Оборона Севастополя) (1911) – Russian historical war film about the Siege of Sevastopol during the Crimean War
- Henry VIII (1911) – British historical film depicting the life of Henry VIII, based on the play of the same name by William Shakespeare and John Fletcher
- The Life and Deeds of the Immortal Leader Karađorđe(Serbian: Живот и дела бесмртног вожда Карађорђа) (1911) – Serbian silent film depicting the eponymous rebel leader Karađorđe, who led the First Serbian uprising of 1804–1813
- Macbeth (1911) – historical drama film based on the William Shakespeare play of the same name about Macbeth, King of Scotland
- Sweet Nell of Old Drury (1911) – Australian silent film about the relationship between Nell Gwynne and King Charles II

=== 1912 ===
- 1812 (Russian: 1812 год) (1912) – Russian historical war film illustrating the events Patriotic War of 1812
- Cleopatra (1912) – historical drama film about the fabled queen of Egypt, Cleopatra, and her affair with Roman general Mark Antony
- Custer's Last Fight (1912) – silent Western film about George Armstrong Custer and his final stand at the Battle of the Little Bighorn
- From the Manger to the Cross (1912) – Christian drama film telling the story of Jesus Christ's life, interspersed with verses from The Bible
- The Independence of Romania (Romanian: Independența României) (1912) – Romanian historical war film depicting the events of the Russo-Turkish War (1877–1878), which led to independence for Romania
- The Loves of Queen Elizabeth (French: Les Amours de la reine Élisabeth) (1912) – French silent drama film based on the love affair between Elizabeth I and the Earl of Essex
- Richard III (1912) – French-American silent drama film depicting the Machiavellian rise to power and subsequent short reign of King Richard III of England
- Saved from the Titanic (1912) – silent drama film about the sinking of the RMS Titanic

=== 1913 ===
- Antony and Cleopatra (Italian: Marcantonio e Cleopatra) (1913) – Italian historical film based on the play of the same name by William Shakespeare, following the relationship between Cleopatra and Mark Antony from the time of the Sicilian revolt to Cleopatra's suicide during the War of Actium
- The Battle of Gettysburg (1913) – silent war film based on the American Civil War battle of the same name
- David Garrick (1913) – silent film about the actor David Garrick
- The Eaglet (French: L'aiglon) (1913) – French historical film portraying the life of Napoleon II
- King Charles (1913) – British historical film about Charles II's escape to Continental Europe, following his army's defeat at the Battle of Worcester
- The Last Days of Pompeii (Italian: Gli ultimi giorni di Pompei) (1913) – Italian historical drama film about the cataclysmic destruction of the city of Pompeii by the eruption of Mount Vesuvius in AD 79
- Macbeth (1913) – historical drama film based on the William Shakespeare play of the same name about Macbeth, King of Scotland
- One Hundred Years of Mormonism (1913) – historical film depicting the early history of the Church of Jesus Christ of Latter-day Saints
- Quo Vadis (1913) – Italian historical drama film set during the latter years of the reign of the emperor Nero
- Sixty Years a Queen (1913) – silent historical film about the life and reign of Queen Victoria
- When Lincoln Paid (1913) – historical drama film focusing on Abraham Lincoln's well-known practice of pardoning young Civil War soldiers condemned to die

=== 1914 ===
- Cabiria (1914) – Italian epic film set in ancient Sicily, Carthage, and Cirta during the period of the Second Punic War, featuring an eruption of Mount Etna, heinous religious rituals in Carthage, the alpine trek of Hannibal, Archimedes' defeat of the Roman fleet at the Siege of Syracuse and Scipio maneuvering in North Africa
- The Higher Law (1914) – silent drama film about François Villon
- Home, Sweet Home (1914) – silent biographical film about John Howard Payne and his creation of the song Home! Sweet Home!
- In the Land of the Head Hunters (1914) – historical drama film fictionalizing the world of the Kwakwaka'wakw peoples of the Queen Charlotte Strait region of the Central Coast of British Columbia, Canada
- The Indian Wars Refought (1914) – silent Western film depicting several historical battles of The Indian Wars
- Ireland a Nation (1914) – British historical film telling the history of Ireland between 1798 and 1914
- Judith of Bethulia (1914) – silent drama film about the life of Judith
- Julius Caesar (Italian: Giulio Cesare) (1914) – Italian historical film portraying the events leading up to the assassination of Julius Caesar
- The Life of General Villa (1914) – silent biographical action–drama film incorporating both staged scenes and authentic live footage from real battles during the Mexican Revolution, around which the plot of the film revolves
- The Life of Shakespeare (1914) – British biographical film following the life of the English playwright William Shakespeare
- The Oubliette (1914) – silent historical drama film about François Villon
- Richelieu (1914) – historical drama film portraying the life of the Seventeenth Century French statesman Cardinal Richelieu
- The Sleeping Sentinel (1914) – historical drama film based on William Scott, a private in the 3rd Vermont Infantry, who fell asleep while on guard duty

=== 1915 ===
- Barbara Frietchie (1915) – silent war drama film based on the life of Barbara Fritchie
- The Birth of a Nation (1915) – epic drama film chronicling the assassination of Abraham Lincoln by John Wilkes Booth and the relationship of two families in the Civil War and Reconstruction eras over the course of several years
- Captain Courtesy (1915) – historical drama film set against the events surrounding the formation of the California Republic on June 14, 1846, and its occupation by United States forces on July 9, 1846
- DuBarry (1915) – historical drama film about Madame du Barry
- Florence Nightingale (1915) – British silent historical film portraying the life of Florence Nightingale, particularly her innovations in nursing during the Crimean War
- Jane Shore (1915) – British silent historical film based on the life of Jane Shore
- Macbeth (1915) – French historical drama film based on the William Shakespeare play of the same name about Macbeth, King of Scotland
- Martyrs of the Alamo (1915) – historical war drama film about the siege of Béxar, the Battle of the Alamo, and the Battle of San Jacinto
- Mistress Nell (1915) – silent historical adventure film about Nell Gwyn
- The Prince and the Pauper (1915) – silent lost film about King Edward VI of England
- The Raven (1915) – biographical film based on the life of Edgar Allan Poe
- Regeneration (1915) – silent biographical crime drama based on the 1903 memoir My Mamie Rose, by Owen Frawley Kildare
- Titanic (1915) – Italian biographical film about the discovery of the mineral titanic
- Under the Crescent (1915) – drama miniseries based on the real life of its lead actress, Ola Humphreyy, who in 1911 married Egyptian Prince Ibrahim Hassan, cousin of the Khedive
- War and Peace (Russian: Война и мир) (1915) – Russian historical film chronicling the Napoleonic era within Russia, notably detailing the French invasion of Russia and its aftermath

=== 1916 ===
- A Yoke of Gold (1916) – historical melodrama set in the early days of the California missions
- The Blacklist (1916) – silent drama film based on the 1915 Colorado miners strike
- David Garrick (1916) – silent historical film based on the life of the eighteenth century British actor David Garrick
- Davy Crockett (1916) – silent film telling the story of the famous Tennessee frontiersman, soldier, scout Davy Crockett
- De Voortrekkers (1916) – epic historical film portraying the Boers' "Great Trek" of the 1830s, concluding with a hegemonic recreation of the Battle of Blood River that occurred on 16 December 1838, when a few hundred armed Afrikaners defeated several thousand Zulus
- Disraeli (1916) – British silent biographical film telling the story of mid-Victorian statesman Benjamin Disraeli manages to thwart the plans of Britain's rival Great Powers and gain control of the strategically important Suez Canal
- Intolerance (1916) – historical anthology film depicting a Judean story of Christ's mission and death, a French story of the events surrounding the St. Bartholomew's Day massacre of 1572 and a Babylonian story of the fall of the Babylonian Empire to Persia in 539 BC and a modern American story (set in about 1914 depicting an industrial strike and its suppression
- Joan the Woman (1916) – silent epic drama film about Joan of Arc
- Macbeth (1916) – historical drama film based on the play of the same name by William Shakespeare depicting an account of Macbeth, King of Scotland, Macduff, and Duncan
- The Mutiny of the Bounty (1916) – Australian-New Zealander silent film about the mutiny aboard HMS Bounty
- Nurse Cavell (1916) – Australian lost film about the execution of Nurse Edith Cavell in the previous year

=== 1917 ===
- Betsy Ross (1917) – silent historical film depicting the story of Revolutionary War heroine Betsy Ross who finds herself in competition with her sister for the affections of a British soldier
- The Black Stork (1917) – drama film depicting a fictionalized account of a "eugenic infanticide" of the child John Bollinger
- Cleopatra (1917) – silent historical drama film telling the story of Cleopatra
- The Conqueror (1917) – silent biographical Western film depicting he life of Sam Houston; soldier, statesman, patriot, and one of the founders of the Republic of Texas
- The Fall of the Romanoffs (1917) – silent drama film taking place during the final days of Rasputin's influence on the Imperial Family shortly before the Russian Revolution
- Her Country's Call (1917) – silent drama film depicting Abraham Lincoln as the American president and the Civil War up to Lincoln's assassination
- The Lincoln Cycle (1917) – silent film portraying the life of American president Abraham Lincoln
- Madame Du Barry (1917) – historical drama film about Madame du Barry, the last maîtresse-en-titre of King Louis XV
- Rasputin, the Black Monk (1917) – lost silent drama film depicting the rise and fall of Rasputin, the so-called "mad monk" who dominated the court of the Russian czar in the period prior to the Russian Revolution
- Santos Vega (1917) – Argentine historical drama film based on the story of the legendary gaucho Santos Vega
- The Spirit of '76 (1917) – historical drama film about the American Revolutionary War
- The Trooper of Troop K (1917) – drama war film based on a black U.S. Army cavalry unit in the early 1900s
- The Woman God Forgot (1917) – historical romantic drama film about Moctezuma II, the ninth Emperor of the Aztec Empire, and his daughter Isabel Moctezuma

=== 1918 ===
- Casanova (1918) – Hungarian biographical film about Giacomo Casanova
- The Crusaders (Italian: La Gerusalemme liberata) (1918) – Italian historical film set during the Crusades and describes Godfrey of Bouillon's conquest of Jerusalem in 1099
- Fabiola (1918) – historical drama film about the rise of Christianity in the Roman Empire
- Ferdinand Lassalle (1918) – German silent historical film portraying the life of Ferdinand Lassalle
- Fields of Honor (1918) – historical drama film depicting a dramatic portrayal of what women are sacrificing to World War I
- Het proces Begeer (1918) – Dutch silent drama film and based on the true story of three criminals who prepare a robbery on the diamond company of the firm Begeer in Amsterdam
- The Kaiser, the Beast of Berlin (1918) – war propaganda melodrama film depicting a propagandist view of the First World War, showing the political greed of the Kaiser Wilhelm II, the resistance of some of his own soldiers, and fanciful prediction of the nature of the war's end
- Lest We Forget (1918) – silent war drama film about the 1915 Lusitania sinking
- The Life Story of David Lloyd George (1918) – British silent biographical film about David Lloyd George, British Prime Minister from 1916 to 1922
- Men Who Have Made Love to Me (1918) – silent biographical feminist film based on Mary MacLane's experiences with six different men
- My Four Years in Germany (1918) – silent war drama film based on the experiences of real life U. S. Ambassador to Germany James W. Gerard
- Nelson (1918) – British historical film based on the biography of Admiral Horatio Nelson
- Private Peat (1918) – lost silent biographical drama film recalling Harold Peat's experiences as one of the first Americans to enlist in WW1
- Symbol of Sacrifice (1918) – South African historical war film dramatizing the 1879 Anglo-Zulu War
- The Woman the Germans Shot (1918) – silent war biographical film about the life and career of Nurse Edith Cavell

=== 1919 ===
- Charlotte Corday (1919) – silent historical drama film about Charlotte Corday, a figure of the French Revolution who assassinated revolutionary and Jacobin leader Jean-Paul Marat on 13 July 1793
- Deliverance (1919) – silent film which tells the story of the life of Helen Keller and her teacher, Annie Sullivan
- The Fighting Roosevelts (1919) – biographical film about Theodore Roosevelt
- Giuliano l'Apostata (1919) – Italian historical drama film about the Roman Emperor Julian, known as Julian the Apostate for his rejection of Christianity
- Madame Dubarry (1919) – German silent film based on the life of Madame du Barry
- Nocturne of Love (German: Nocturno der Liebe) (1919) – German silent historical film portraying the life of the composer Frederic Chopin
- Ravished Armenia (1919) – silent drama film about the Armenian genocide based on the account of survivor Aurora Mardiganian, who also played the lead role in the film
- The Romance of Lady Hamilton (1919) – British historical drama film following the love affair between the British Admiral Horatio Nelson and Lady Emma Hamilton during the Napoleonic Wars

== 1920s ==
=== 1920 ===
- Anna Boleyn (1920) – German historical film about Anne Boleyn
- Catherine the Great (1920) – German historical film about Catherine the Great, empress of Russia
- Countess Walewska (1920) – German historical film about Napoleon and Marie Walewska
- The Dancer Barberina (1920) – German historical film about Frederick the Great and Barberina Campanini
- The Duke of Reichstadt (German: Der Herzog von Reichstadt) (1920) – Austrian historical film about the life of Napoleon
- Headin' Home (1920) – silent biographical sports film about the life of baseball player Babe Ruth
- If I Were King (1920) – silent drama film about François Villon
- Madame Récamier (1920) – German historical film portraying the life of Juliette Récamier, a French society figure of the Napoleonic Era
- Mary Tudor (German: Maria Tudor) (1920) – German historical drama film based on the play of the same name by Victor Hugo, about Mary I of England
- The Tragedy of a Great (German: Die Tragödie eines Großen) (1920) – German silent historical film depicting the life of the painter Rembrandt
- Within Our Gates (1920) – silent race film portrays the contemporary racial situation in the United States during the early twentieth century, the years of Jim Crow, the revival of the Ku Klux Klan, the Great Migration of blacks to cities of the North and Midwest, and the emergence of the "New Negro"

=== 1921 ===
- Danton (1921) – German silent historical film following the trial and execution of several leading French Revolutionaries including Georges Danton
- Disraeli (1921) – silent historical drama film depicting the story of British prime minister Benjamin Disraeli and the purchase by England of the Suez Canal
- The Gunsaulus Mystery (1921) – silent race film inspired by events and figures in the 1913–1915 trial of Leo Frank for the murder of Mary Phagan
- Jánošík (1921) – Slovak historical film about the popular legend of the highwayman Juraj Jánošík
- Jesse James as the Outlaw (1921) – Western historical film about Jesse James' return home to Missouri after the American Civil War
- Jesse James Under the Black Flag (1921) – Western historical film about Jesse James' joining of the Quantrill's raiders, a guerrilla force which fought against union sympathizers during the American Civil War
- Lady Hamilton (1921) – German historical film depicting the love affair between the British Admiral Lord Nelson and Lady Emma Hamilton
- Ninety-Three (French: Quatre-vingt-treize) (1921) – French historical film concerning the Revolt in the Vendée and Chouannerie – the counter-revolutionary uprisings in 1793 during the French Revolution
- Orphans of the Storm (1921) – silent drama film set in late-18th-century France, before and during the French Revolution
- The Queen of Sheba (1921) – silent drama film about the story of the ill-fated romance between Solomon, King of Israel, and the Queen of Sheba
- Theodora (Italian: Teodora) (1921) – Italian historical film depicting the life of the Byzantine empress Theodora

=== 1922 ===
- A Prince of Lovers (1922) – British silent biographical film portraying the life of the British writer Lord Byron
- A Stage Romance (1922) – silent historical drama film portraying the adventures of the British actor Edmund Kean
- Cocaine (1922) – British crime film depicting the distribution of cocaine by gangsters through a series of London nightclubs and was reportedly based on real-life criminal Brilliant Chang
- Dick Turpin's Ride to York (1922) – British silent historical film telling the story of the famous 18th-century highwayman Dick Turpin and his legendary 200 mi (320 km) overnight ride from London to York on his mount Black Bess
- The Earl of Essex (German: Der Graf von Essex) (1922) – German silent historical film about Graf Essex
- The Game of Life – British historical film depicting great events of Queen Victoria's reign seen through the eyes of three girls
- In the Days of Buffalo Bill (1922) Western miniseries about Buffalo Bill Cody
- Louise de Lavallière (1922) – German historical drama film portraying the life of the seventeenth century French courtesan Louise de La Vallière, a lover of Louis XIV
- The Loves of Pharaoh (German: Das Weib des Pharao) (1922) – German historical epic film about Pharaoh Amenemope
- Lucrezia Borgia (1922) – German historical drama film portraying the life of the Renaissance Italian aristocrat Lucrezia Borgia
- Macbeth (1922) – British historical drama film based on the William Shakespeare play of the same name about Macbeth, King of Scotland
- Marie Antoinette, the Love of a King (German: Marie Antoinette – Das Leben einer Königin) (1922) – German historical drama film depicting the life of Marie Antoinette, Queen of France, during the years leading up to and during the French Revolution in which she was executed
- Nanook of the North (1922) – silent docudrama film following the lives of an Inuk, Nanook, and his family as they travel, search for food, and trade in the Ungava Peninsula of northern Quebec, Canada
- Nero (1922) – American-Italian silent historical film portraying the life of the Roman Emperor Nero
- Peter the Great (German: Peter der Große) (1922) – German silent historical film depicting the life of the reformist Russian Tsar Peter the Great
- Rob Roy (1922) – British silent historical film depicting the life of the early 18th century outlaw Rob Roy MacGregor
- Salomé (1922) – Christian drama film depicting a loose retelling of the biblical story of King Herod and his execution of John the Baptist at the request of Herod's stepdaughter, Salomé, whom he lusts after
- Samrat Ashoka (Telugu: సామ్రాట్ అశోక్) (1922) – Indian Telugu-language historical drama film based on the life of the 3rd Mauryan Indian emperor Ashoka
- Samson and Delilah (German: Samson und Delila) (1922) – Austrian Christian drama film depicting the biblical story of Samson and Delilah with a modern twist

=== 1923 ===
- A Royal Divorce (1923) – British historical drama film depicting the romantic relationship and political divorce between Emperor Napoleon and his wife Empress Josephine
- Bonnie Prince Charlie (1923) – British silent historical film depicting the Jacobite Rebellion of 1745 and its aftermath when the Jacobite pretender Charles Edward Stuart evaded capture by the forces loyal to the Hanoverians
- Christopher Columbus (1923) – German silent historical film depicting the Discovery of America by the Italian explorer Christopher Columbus in 1492
- The Courtship of Miles Standish (1923) – historical drama film about the early days of Plymouth Colony, the colonial settlement established in America by the Mayflower Pilgrims
- Franz Lehár (1923) – Austrian silent biographical film portraying the life of the composer Franz Lehár
- Friedrich Schiller (1923) – German silent historical film about the life of the eighteenth century writer Friedrich Schiller
- Guy Fawkes (1923) – British silent historical film depicting the Gunpowder Plot of 1605 in which a group of plotters planned to blow up the Houses of Parliament
- I.N.R.I. (1923) – German silent religious epic film depicting a retelling of the events leading up to the crucifixion of Jesus Christ
- The Little Napoleon (German: Der kleine Napoleon) (1923) – German silent historical comedy film depicting the life and amorous adventures of Jérôme Bonaparte, the younger brother of Napoleon, who installed him as King of Westphalia
- The Loves of Mary, Queen of Scots (1923) – British silent historical film depicting the life of Mary, Queen of Scots, and her eventual execution
- Our Hospitality (1923) – silent comedy film displaying satire of the real-life Hatfield–McCoy feud
- Paganini (1923) – German silent historical film about Niccolò Paganini
- Richard the Lion-Hearted (1923) – silent historical adventure film about Richard I of England
- The Royal Oak (1923) – British historical drama film about the Royal Oak in which King Charles II of England hid to escape the Roundheads following the Battle of Worcester in 1651
- The Ten Commandments (1923) – Christian epic film recreating the biblical story of the Exodus
- Under the Red Robe (1923) – historical drama film depicting a real historical event, the Day of the Dupes, the timing is the autumn of 1630 when Cardinal Richelieu was Chief Minister for Louis XIII
- The Virgin Queen (1923) – British historical film depicting the life of the English Queen Elizabeth I
- Wild Bill Hickok (1923) – Western drama film about Washington D.C. Gunfighter Wild Bill Hickok

=== 1924 ===
- Abraham Lincoln (1924) – biographical film featuring the presidency and assassination of Abraham Lincoln during the American Civil War
- America (1924) – Silent historical war romance film based on the heroic story of the events during the American Revolutionary War, in which filmmaker D. W. Griffith created a film adaptation of Robert W. Chambers' 1905 novel The Reckoning
- Beau Brummel (1924) – Silent historical drama film depicting the life of the British Regency dandy Beau Brummell
- Becket (1924) – British silent drama film depicting the fatal encounter between Henry II and the Archbishop of Canterbury Thomas Becket
- Charles XII's Courier (Swedish: Carl XII:s kurir) (1924) – Swedish historical adventure film about Charles XII following his defeat at Bender
- Claude Duval (1924) – British silent adventure film based on the historical story of Claude Duval
- The Colleen Bawn (1924) – British romantic drama film based on the actual 1819 murder of 15-year-old Ellen Scanlan
- Diego Corrientes (1924) – Spanish silent historical film portraying the life of the eighteenth century highwaymen Diego Corrientes Mateos
- Dorothy Vernon of Haddon Hall (1924) – historical drama film following the life and romances of Dorothy Vernon in Elizabethan England
- Helena (1924) – German historical drama film depicting the fall of Troy
- Henry, King of Navarre (1924) – British historical film about Henry IV of France
- The Iron Horse (1924) – Western drama film about the construction of the American first transcontinental railroad
- Janice Meredith (1924) – historical war drama film about the American Revolutionary War
- The Lord of Love and Power (1924) – Indian historical drama film depicting the rivalry between Munj, the Paramara monarch of Dharanagari and Tailap
- Messalina (1924) – Italian historical drama film portraying the life of Messalina, the third wife of the Roman Emperor Claudius

=== 1925 ===
- Battleship Potemkin (Russian: Бронено́сец Потёмкин) (1925) – Soviet silent drama film presenting a dramatization of the mutiny that occurred in 1905 when the crew of the Russian battleship Potemkin rebelled against its officers
- Charles XII (Swedish: Karl XII) (1925) – Swedish historical film depicting the life of Charles XII of Sweden (1682-1718) who oversaw the expansion of the Swedish Empire until its defeat at the Battle of Poltava
- The Goose Woman (1925) – silent drama film based in part on the then already sensational Hall-Mills murder case
- The Hussar of Death (Spanish: El Húsar de la Muerte) (1925) – Chilean silent biographical film based on the adventures of the guerrilla leader Manuel Rodríguez during the Reconquista, until his death in 1818
- Karel Havlíček Borovský (1925) – Czechoslovak biographical drama film about Karel Havlíček Borovský and is set during the 1848 revolutions
- Livingstone (1925) – British silent biographical film depicting the life of the African missionary David Livingstone including his efforts to end slavery and bring education in Africa and his celebrated meeting with Henry Morton Stanley
- Prem Sanyas (The Light of Asia) (1925) – Weimar-Indian silent film based on the life of Prince Siddhartha Gautama, who founded Buddhism by becoming the Buddha or the "Enlightened one"
- The Scarlet West (1925) – historical drama film about George Armstrong Custer and the Battle of the Little Bighorn
- Tumbleweeds (1925) – silent Western film depicting the Cherokee Strip land rush of 1893

=== 1926 ===
- The Captain from Köpenick (German: Der Hauptmann von Köpenick) (1926) – German silent film based on the case of Wilhelm Voigt
- The Eleven Schill Officers (German: Die elf Schill'schen Offiziere) (1926) – German historical film depicting the failed 1809 uprising of Prussian soldiers led by Ferdinand von Schill against the occupying French during the Napoleonic War
- The General (1926) – silent film inspired by the Great Locomotive Chase, a true story of an event that occurred during the American Civil War
- The Great K & A Train Robbery (1926) – silent Western film based on the actual foiling of a train robbery by Dick Gordon
- Irish Destiny (1926) – Irish historical war film dealing with the Irish War of Independence
- Jean Chouan (1926) – French historical film set at the time of the French Revolution, when Jean Chouan took part in a counterrevolutionary uprising
- The Johnstown Flood (1926) – Silent epic drama film that addresses the Great Flood of 1889 in Johnstown, Pennsylvania
- The Last Days of Pompeii (Italian: Gli ultimi giorni di Pompei) (1926) – Italian historical drama film about the cataclysmic destruction of the city of Pompeii by the eruption of Mount Vesuvius in AD 79
- Nell Gwyn (1926) – British silent romance film following the life of Nell Gwynne, the mistress of Charles II
- Nelson (1926) – British historical film about Admiral Horatio Nelson
- Our Emden (German: Unsere Emden) (1926) – German war film depicting the operations of the German First World War cruiser SMS Emden
- Secrets of a Soul (German: Geheimnisse einer Seele) (1926) – German silent drama film based on the works and theories of Sigmund Freud
- With Buffalo Bill on the U. P. Trail (1926) – historical Western film about Buffalo Bill Cody
- With Davy Crockett at the Fall of the Alamo (1926) – silent Western film focusing on Davy Crockett before & during his time at the Alamo as one of the defenders, and ultimately, one of those who gave their lives

=== 1927 ===
- The Beloved Rogue (1927) – silent romantic adventure film loosely based on the life of the 15th century French poet, François Villon
- Bismarck 1862–1898 (1927) – German historical film depicting the latter part of Otto von Bismarck's career including his long spell as Chancellor of Germany
- Boadicea (1927) – British biographical historical film depicting the life of the Celtic Queen Boudica and her rebellion against the Roman Empire
- The Chess Player (French: Le Joueur d'échecs) (1927) – French silent film based on the story of the chess-playing automaton known as The Turk
- Chicago (1927) – silent film inspired by the stories of Belva Gaertner and Beulah Annan, jazz babies on death row
- The Club of the Big Deed (Russian: Союз Великого дела) (1927) – Soviet silent historical drama film about the 1825 Decembrist revolt
- The End of St. Petersburg (Russian: Конец Санкт-Петербурга) (1927) – Soviet silent film depicting the Bolsheviks' rise to power in 1917
- The King of Kings (1927) – silent epic film depicting the last weeks of Jesus before his crucifixion
- The Loves of Casanova (1927) – French historical drama film portraying the life and adventures of Giacomo Casanova
- Madame Pompadour (1927) – British silent historical drama film depicting the life of Madame de Pompadour, mistress of Louis XV
- Mata Hari (German: Mata Hari, die rote Tänzerin) (1927) – German silent drama film depicting the life and death of the German World War I spy Mata Hari
- Napoléon (1927) – French silent epic historical film telling the story of Napoleon's early years
- Netaji Palkar (1927) – Indian biographical drama film based on the Maratha King Shivaji's Senapati (Commander-in-Chief) Netaji Palkar, and his struggle to save his kingdom
- October: Ten Days That Shook the World (Russian: Октябрь (Десять дней, которые потрясли мир)) (1927) – Soviet silent historical film depicting a dramatization of the 1917 October Revolution commissioned for the tenth anniversary of the event
- The Private Life of Helen of Troy (1927) – comedy adventure film about Helen of Troy based on the 1925 novel of the same name by John Erskine
- Queen Louise (German: Königin Luise) (1927) – German historical film portraying the short life of Louise of Mecklenburg-Strelitz, wife of the Prussian monarch Frederick William III
- The Yankee Clipper (1927) – historical adventure film set against the maritime rivalry between the United States and Great Britain in the mid-19th century

=== 1928 ===
- Balaclava (1928) – British silent war film based on accounts of the Charge of the Light Brigade
- The Charge of the Gauchos (Spanish: Una nueva y gloriosa nación) (1928) – Argentine-American silent historical film about Manuel Belgrano, one of the leaders of the 1810 May Revolution
- Cleopatra (1928) – historical film about Cleopatra, Queen of the Ptolemaic Kingdom of Egypt from 51 to 30 BC
- Clothes Make the Woman (1928) – historical romantic drama film loosely based on the story of Anna Anderson, a Polish woman who claimed to be Grand Duchess Anastasia Nikolaevna of Russia, the daughter of the last czar of Russia Nicholas II and his wife Alexandra
- Dawn (1928) – British silent war film based on the story of World War I martyr Edith Cavell
- The Divine Woman (1928) – silent film loosely based on stories of the early life of the French actress Sarah Bernhardt
- Dream of Love (1928) – silent biographical drama film depicting the story of Prince Maurice de Saxe and Adrienne Lecouvreur, a Gypsy performer
- Glorious Betsy (1928) – historical drama film depicting the real-life courtship, marriage, and forced breakup of Jérôme Bonaparte, brother of Napoleon, and his wife from the American South, Elizabeth Patterson
- Huragan (1928) – Polish historical film depicting the events running up to the January uprising
- Kastus Kalinovskiy (Russian: Кастусь Калиновский) (1928) – Soviet historical drama film portraying the nineteenth century revolutionary Konstanty Kalinowski
- Luther (1928) – German silent film about the life of Martin Luther, father of the Protestant Reformation
- Madame Récamier (1928) – French silent film about the life of Juliette Récamier
- Maria Marten (1928) – British silent drama film based on the real story of the Red Barn murder in the 1820s
- Mulan Joins the Army (Mandarin: 木蘭從軍) (1928) – Chinese historical film about Hua Mulan
- The Old Fritz (German: Der alte Fritz) (1928) – German silent historical drama film telling the story of Frederick the Great
- The Passion of Joan of Arc (French: La Passion de Jeanne d'Arc) (1928) – French silent historical film based on the actual record of the trial of Joan of Arc
- The Patriot (1928) – biographical film telling the story of Emperor Paul I of Russia
- Rasputin (German: Dornenweg einer Fürstin) (1928) – German-Soviet drama film about Russian mystic Grigori Rasputin
- Rasputin, the Holy Sinner (German: Rasputins Liebesabenteuer) (1928) – German historical film portraying the deep intrigue and mystical fanaticism of the last days of the Romanoffs, when Rasputin, the mad monk, had such a hold over them
- Shiraz (1928) – historical drama film based on the story of the commissioning of the Taj Mahal – the great monument of a Mughul prince for his dead queen
- Verdun: Visions of History (French: Verdun, visions d'histoire) (1928) – French biographical drama film portraying the battle of Verdun, primarily by recreating the battle on its location, but also with the use of newsreel footage and dramatic scenes

=== 1929 ===
- Andreas Hofer (1929) – German historical film based on the story of the Tyrolean innkeeper and patriot Andreas Hofer who led an Austrian uprising against Bavarian and French troops during the Napoleonic Wars
- Atlantic (1929) – British drama film based on the RMS Titanic
- Cagliostro (1929) – German silent drama film based on the life of the eighteenth century Italian occultist Alessandro Cagliostro
- Disraeli (1929) – pre-code historical film revolving around the British plan to buy the Suez Canal and the efforts of two spies to stop it
- The Divine Lady (1929) – pre-code drama film telling the story of the love affair between Horatio Nelson and Emma Hamilton
- The Iron Mask (1929) – part-talkie adventure film based on the French legend of the Man in the Iron Mask
- Ludwig II, King of Bavaria (German: Ludwig der Zweite, König von Bayern) (1929) – German silent historical film portraying the life and reign of the monarch Ludwig II who ruled Bavaria from 1864 to 1886
- The Miraculous Life of Thérèse Martin (French: La Vie miraculeuse de Thérèse Martin) (1929) – French silent film depicting biographical account of the late 19th century Discalced Carmelite nun who died at age 24 from tuberculosis and was canonized in 1925
- The New Babylon (Russian: Новый Вавилон) (1929) – Soviet historical drama film dealing with the 1871 Paris Commune and the events leading to it
- The Queen's Necklace (French: Le collier de la reine) (1929) – French historical drama film about the Affair of the Diamond Necklace which occurred before the French Revolution
- The Royal Box (German: Die Königsloge) (1929) – historical film about the life of the British actor Edmund Kean
- Waterloo (1929) – German war film depicting the victory of the Allied Forces over Napoleon at the Battle of Waterloo in 1815

== 1930s ==
=== 1930 ===
- A Lady's Morals (1930) – pre-code biographical film offering a highly fictionalized account of opera singer Jenny Lind
- Abraham Lincoln (1930) – pre-code biographical film about Abraham Lincoln
- Billy the Kid (1930) – pre-code Western film about the relationship between frontier outlaw Billy the Kid and lawman Pat Garrett
- Dreyfus (1930) – German drama film chronicling the Dreyfus affair
- The Flute Concert of Sanssouci (German: Das Flötenkonzert von Sans-souci) – German historical drama film telling the story of the rise to power of King Frederick II of Prussia and his military campaigns to make Prussia a major power in Europe
- The Loves of Robert Burns (1930) – British historical musical film depicting the life of the Scottish poet Robert Burns
- Ludwig II, King of Bavaria (German: Ludwig der Zweite, König von Bayern) (1930) – German silent historical film portraying the life and reign of the monarch Ludwig II who ruled Bavaria from 1864 to 1886
- St. Wenceslas (Czech: Svatý Václav) (1930) – Czechoslovak historical film about Wenceslaus I, Duke of Bohemia

=== 1931 ===
- Alexander Hamilton (1931) – pre-code biographical film about Alexander Hamilton
- Comradeship (German: Kameradschaft) (1931) – French-German drama film concerning a mine disaster where German miners rescue French miners from an underground fire and explosion. The story takes place in the Lorraine–Saar regions, along the border between France and Germany
- Danton (1931) – German historical drama film depicting the dramatic downfall and execution of Georges Danton in 1794 at the hands of Maximilien Robespierre
- Dreyfus (1931) – British drama film depicting the Dreyfus affair
- The Duke of Reichstadt (German: Der Herzog von Reichstadt) (1931) – German historical drama film based on the life of Napoleon II
- The Eaglet (French: L'aiglon) (1931) – French historical drama film portraying the life of Napoleon II
- Kalidas (Tamil: காளிதாஸ்; Telugu: కాళిదాసు) (1931) – Indian Tamil and Telugu language biographical film based on the life of the Sanskrit poet Kalidasa
- Mata Hari (1931) – pre-code drama film based on the life of Mata Hari, an exotic dancer and courtesan executed for espionage during World War I
- Road to Life (Russian: Putyovka v zhizn) (1931) – Soviet drama film in which hundreds of orphans are sent to a labor commune
- M (German: M) (1931) – M is a 1931 German mystery suspense thriller film directed by Fritz Lang, a film in which the German Police are unable to capture a notorious child murderer.
- The Theft of the Mona Lisa (German: Der Raub der Mona Lisa) (1931) – German drama film based on the 1911 real robbery
- Yorck (1931) – German war film portraying the life of the Prussian General Ludwig Yorck von Wartenburg, particularly his refusal to serve in Napoleon's army during the French Invasion of Russia in 1812

=== 1932 ===
- The Dancer of Sanssouci (German: Die Tänzerin von Sans Souci) (1932) – German historical drama film portraying the interactions between Frederick the Great and the celebrated dancer Barberina Campanini
- Danton (1932) – French historical drama film depicting the life of the French Revolutionary Georges Danton and his eventual execution by hardliners of the Revolution
- I Am a Fugitive from a Chain Gang (1932) – pre-code crime-drama film based on the story of a wrongfully convicted man on a chain gang who escapes to Chicago
- Jenny Lind (1932) – pre-code musical film about opera singer Jenny Lind
- Palio (1932) – Italian historical drama film about the Palio di Siena during the Medieval era
- Pergolesi (1932) – Italian historical musical film portraying the brief life of the eighteenth century Italian composer Giovanni Battista Pergolesi
- Rasputin and the Empress (1932) – pre-code film set in Imperial Russia during the last years of the reign of Czar Nicholas II and the Czarina Alexandra
- The Revenge of Pancho Villa (Spanish: La Venganza de Pancho Villa) (1932) – bilingual war film depicting the celebrated Mexican Revolutionary Pancho Villa (1878–1923)
- Silver Dollar (1932) – pre-code biographical film depicting the story of the rise and fall of Horace Tabor (renamed Yates Martin), a silver tycoon in 19th century Colorado
- Tannenberg (1932) – Swiss-German war film based on the 1914 Battle of Tannenberg during the First World War
- The Wet Parade (1932) – pre-code drama film showing how two families are devastated by the effects of alcohol consumption and Prohibition

=== 1933 ===
- The Bowery (1933) – pre-code epic historical drama film inspired by the real life exploits of Chuck Connors and Steve Brodie in 1890s New York
- Hans Westmar (German: Hans Westmar. Einer von vielen. Ein deutsches Schicksal aus dem Jahre 1929) (1933) – Nazi German propaganda film depicting a partially fictionalized biography of the Nazi martyr Horst Wessel
- The Hymn of Leuthen (German: Der Choral von Leuthen) (1933) – German biographical drama film depicting the life of Frederick the Great
- In the Wake of the Bounty (1933) – Australian action drama film about the 1789 Mutiny on the Bounty
- The Man Who Dared (1933) – pre-code drama film based on Anton Cermak, the Chicago mayor killed in an assassination attempt on Franklin D. Roosevelt in 1933
- Night Flight (1933) – pre-code aviation drama film based on Antoine de Saint-Exupéry's personal experiences while flying on South American mail routes
- The Private Life of Henry VIII (1933) – British drama film focusing on the marriages of King Henry VIII of England
- Queen Christina (1933) – pre-code biographical film portraying the life of Christina, Queen of Sweden, who became monarch at the age of six in 1632 and grew to be a powerful and influential leader
- Voltaire (1933) – pre-code biographical film about Voltaire, an 18th-century French writer and philosopher
- Waltz War (German: Walzerkrieg) (1933) – German musical comedy film loosely based on the rivalry between waltz composers Joseph Lanner and Johann Strauss I, as well as the life of the Austrian ballet dancer Katti Lanner (Joseph's daughter) who eventually settled in Victorian Britain

=== 1934 ===
- The Barretts of Wimpole Street (1934) – romantic drama film based on the real-life romance between poets Elizabeth Barrett and Robert Browning, despite the opposition of her abusive father
- British Agent (1934) – romantic spy film about R. H. Bruce Lockhart, who worked for the British Secret Service during the Russian Revolution and had an affair with a Russian agent, later known as Moura Budberg
- Chapaev (1934) – Soviet war film depicting the life of Vasily Ivanovich Chapayev (1887–1919), a Red Army notable commander of the Russian Civil War
- Cleopatra (1934) – epic film depicting a retelling of the story of Cleopatra VII of Egypt
- Colonel Blood (1934) – British historical adventure film based on a dramatised account of the exploits of the historical renegade, Thomas Blood, in the Seventeenth Century and his attempted theft of the English Crown Jewels
- The Eternal Dream (German: Der ewige Traum) (1934) – German historical film about mountaineer Jacques Balmat
- Ferdowsi (Persian: فردوسی) (1934) – Iranian biography drama film about the famous Iranian poet Ferdowsi, author of the Shahnameh book of epic poems
- The House of Rothschild (1934) – pre-code historical drama film chronicling the rise of the Rothschild family of European bankers
- The Iron Duke (1934) – British historical film depicting the story Arthur Wellesley, 1st Duke of Wellington in the events leading up to the Battle of Waterloo and beyond
- Jew Süss (1934) – British historical drama film about Joseph Süß Oppenheimer
- Love Time (1934) – historical drama film about the nineteenth century Austrian composer Franz Schubert
- Madame Du Barry (1934) – historical film portraying the life of Madame Du Barry, the last mistress of King Louis XV
- The Man They Could Not Hang (1934) – Australian drama film about the life of John Babbacombe Lee
- The Mighty Barnum (1934) – comedy biographical film about P.T. Barnum
- Nell Gwynn (1934) – British historical drama film portraying the historical romance between Charles II of England and the actress Nell Gwyn
- The Rise of Catherine the Great (1934) – British historical film about the rise to power of Catherine the Great
- The Scarlet Empress (1934) – historical drama film about the life of Catherine the Great
- Song of Farewell (French: La chanson de l'adieu) (1934) – German historical drama film based on the life of the composer Frédéric Chopin and his relationship with George Sand
- Unfinished Symphony (1934) – British-Austrian musical drama film based on the story of Franz Schubert who, in the 1820s left his symphony unfinished after losing the love of his life
- Viva Villa! (1934) – pre-code Western film about Mexican revolutionary Pancho Villa
- Waltzes from Vienna (1934) – British biographical film depicting the story of Johann Strauss, the Elder and the Younger
- Willem van Oranje (1934) – Dutch biographical film portraying the life of William the Silent, and the origins of the Dutch Revolt

=== 1935 ===
- Abdul the Damned (1935) – British historical drama film set in the Ottoman Empire in the years before the First World War, during the reign of Sultan Abdul Hamid II and the constitutionalist Young Turks who dethroned him for power
- Annie Oakley (1935) – Western film based on the life of Annie Oakley
- Cardinal Richelieu (1935) – historical film depicting the life of the great seventeenth century French statesman Cardinal Richelieu and his dealings with Louis XIII
- Casta Diva (1935) – Italian musical drama film concerning Italian composer Vincenzo Bellini and his problems with his opera Norma
- Clive of India (1935) – historical biographical film about the life of Robert Clive
- The Crusades (1935) – historical adventure film depicting the events of the Third Crusade
- Diamond Jim (1935) – biographical film depicting the life of legendary entrepreneur James Buchanan Brady, including his romance with entertainer Lillian Russell
- The Dictator (1935) – British historical drama film depicting the tumultuous relationship between King Christian VII and his English consort Caroline Matilda in 18th century Copenhagen and the Queen's tragic affair with the royal physician and liberal reformer Johann Friedrich Struensee
- Drake of England (1935) – British drama film depicting the life of Francis Drake and the events leading up to the defeat of the Armada in 1588
- Golgotha (1935) – French drama film about the death of Jesus Christ
- Harmony Lane (1935) – biographical drama film based upon the life of Stephen Foster
- Joan of Arc (German: Das Mädchen Johanna) (1935) – Nazi German historical drama film depicting the life of Joan of Arc, and is the first female embodiment of the Nazi Führer figure in film
- Joymoti (Assamese: জয়মোটি) (1935) – Indian Assamese-language historical film about the 17th-century Ahom princess Joymoti Konwari
- Lucrezia Borgia (French: Lucrèce Borgia) (1935) – French historical film about Lucrezia Borgia
- Maria Marten, or The Murder in the Red Barn (1935) – British melodrama film based on the true story of the 1827 Red Barn murder where a 25-year-old mother is shot dead by her lover and her stepmother claims to have dreamt of the murder the night of the event, before the young woman's body was discovered
- Murder in Harlem (1935) – race film about the 1913 trial of Leo Frank for the murder of Mary Phagan
- Mutiny on the Bounty (1935) – drama film depicting the mutiny-at-sea tale
- Pasteur (1935) – French biographical drama film portraying the life of the French scientist Louis Pasteur
- Peg of Old Drury (1935) – British historical film about 18th century Irish actress Peg Woffington
- The Private Life of Louis XIV (German: Liselotte von der Pfalz) (1935) – Nazi German historical film portraying the life of the Heidelberg-born Elizabeth Charlotte, Princess Palatine, who married into the French royal family during the reign of Louis XIV
- Royal Cavalcade (1935) – British drama film portraying a dramatised pastiche of great events that occurred during the reign of George V
- Together We Live (1935) – drama film about the 1934 West Coast waterfront strike
- Toni (1935) – French drama film based on a true story about migrant workers in Martigues
- Triumph of the Will (German: Triumph des Willens) (1935) – Nazi German propaganda film chronicling the 1934 Nazi Party Congress in Nuremberg, which was attended by more than 700,000 Nazi supporters

=== 1936 ===
- Augustus the Strong (German: August der Starke) (1936) – German-Polish biographical film depicting the life of Augustus the Strong, the Eighteenth Century ruler of Saxony and Poland
- Barbara Radziwiłłówna (1936) – Polish historical film about the life of Barbara Radziwiłł
- Beethoven's Great Love (French: Un grand amour de Beethoven) (1936) – French historical musical drama film depicting the career of the composer Ludwig van Beethoven
- Cafe Moscow (Hungarian: Café Moszkva) (1936) – Hungarian adventure anti-war film set during the First World War on the Eastern Front between Russia and the Austro-Hungarian Empire
- The Cardinal (1936) – British historical drama film depicting a power battle in sixteenth-century Rome between the leading church-statesman Giuliano de' Medici and one of his rivals
- Daniel Boone (1936) – western historical drama film telling the story of Daniel Boone settling Kentucky
- David Livingstone (1936) – British historical adventure film portraying the expedition of the British explorer David Livingstone to Africa to discover the source of the Nile, his disappearance, and the expedition to find him led by Stanley
- The Dawn (1936) – Irish historical film about the Fenian Rising and the Irish War of Independence
- The Emperor of California (German: Der Kaiser von Kalifornien) (1936) – Nazi German Western film following the life story of Johann Augustus Sutter, the owner of Sutter's Mill, famous as the birthplace of the great California Gold Rush of 1849
- The Great Ziegfeld (1936) – musical drama film portraying the ups and downs of Florenz Ziegfeld Jr., famed producer of extravagant stage revues
- Hearts Divided (1936) – musical film about the real-life marriage between American Elizabeth 'Betsy' Patterson and Jérôme Bonaparte, brother of Napoleon
- Hearts in Bondage (1936) – war drama film depicting the Union Navy's deliberate sinking of USS Merrimack, the Confederate States Navy's salvage and refitting of the ship as the ironclad CSS Virginia, the Union Navy's development of the ironclad USS Monitor to counter Virginia, and the subsequent engagement of the two vessels in the Battle of Hampton Roads
- Journey to Arzrum (Russian: Путешествие в Арзрум) (1936) – Soviet drama film depicting Alexander Pushkin's eponymous travel account of his journey to the Caucasus, Armenia, and Arzrum (modern Erzurum) in eastern Turkey during the Russo-Turkish War (1828–29)
- Juan Moreira (1936) – Argentine historical action film portraying the life of the nineteenth century guacho and outlaw Juan Moreira
- Lloyd's of London (1936) – historical drama film loosely based on historical events, following the dealings of a man who works at Lloyd's of London during the Napoleonic Wars
- Mary of Scotland (1936) – biographical drama film about the 16th-century ruler Mary, Queen of Scots
- The Plainsman (1936) – Western drama film presenting a highly fictionalized account of the adventures and relationships between Wild Bill Hickok, Calamity Jane, Buffalo Bill Cody, and General George Custer
- The Prisoner of Shark Island (1936) – drama film loosely based on the life of Maryland physician Samuel Mudd, who treated the injured presidential assassin John Wilkes Booth and later spent time in prison after his controversial conviction for being one of Booth's accomplices
- Rembrandt (1936) – British biographical drama film about the life of 17th-century Dutch painter Rembrandt van Rijn
- Rhodes of Africa (1936) – British biographical film charting the life of Cecil Rhodes
- Robin Hood of El Dorado (1936) – Western film about real-life Mexican folk hero Joaquin Murrieta
- San Francisco (1936) – musical-drama disaster film based on the April 18, 1906 San Francisco earthquake
- Sant Tukaram (Marathi: Sant Tukārām) (1936) – Indian Marathi-language film based on the life of Tukaram (1608–50), a prominent Varkari saint and spiritual poet of the Bhakti movement in India
- The Story of Louis Pasteur (1936) – biographical film about the renowned scientist who developed major advances in microbiology, which revolutionized agriculture and medicine
- Sutter's Gold (1936) – Western film depicting a fictionalized version of the aftermath of the discovery of gold on Sutter's property, spurring the California Gold Rush of 1849
- Tudor Rose (1936) – British historical film depicting a dramatization of Lady Jane Grey's brief reign as the queen of England
- Whom the Gods Love (1936) – British biographical film portraying the life of the Eighteenth Century Austrian composer Wolfgang Amadeus Mozart
- The White Angel (1936) – historical drama film depicting Florence Nightingale's pioneering work in nursing during the Crimean War

=== 1937 ===
- Ambikapathy (Tamil: அம்பிகாபதி) (1937) – Indian Tamil-language historical film about the poet Kambar who wrote the 'Kambaramayana' in Tamil at Karikala Chola's court
- Auld Lang Syne (1937) – British historical drama film based on the life of the eighteenth century Scottish poet Robert Burns
- Chintamani (Tamil: சிந்தாமணி) (1937) – Indian Tamil-language film based on the life story of a Sanskrit poet named Bilwamangal
- Condottieri (1937) – Italian historical drama film portraying the life of Giovanni de' Medici, a celebrated condottiere of the sixteenth century
- Conquest (1937) – historical drama film telling the story of the Polish Countess Marie Walewska, who becomes the mistress of Napoleon to influence his actions towards her homeland
- The Courier of Lyon (French: L'affaire du courrier de Lyon) (1937) – French historical drama film based on the Courrier de Lyon case of 1796
- The Edge of the World (1937) – British historical film loosely based on the evacuation of the Scottish archipelago of St Kilda
- Fanny Elssler (German: Fanny Elßler) (1937) – Nazi German historical drama film loosely based on the life of the dancer Fanny Elssler
- Fire Over England (1937) – British drama film set during the reign of Elizabeth I focusing on England's victory over the Spanish Armada
- Francis the First (French: François Premier) (1937) – French historical comedy film set during the reign of Francis I
- The Great Garrick (1937) – historical comedy film about the famous eighteenth-century British actor David Garrick, who travels to France for a guest appearance at the Comédie-Française
- Heroes of the Alamo (1937) – historical war film retelling of the events of the Texas Revolution and the Battle of the Alamo
- John Ericsson, Victor of Hampton Roads (Swedish: John Ericsson – segraren vid Hampton Roads) (1937) – Swedish historical drama film based on the life of the nineteenth century Swedish engineer and inventor John Ericsson, known for his work in Britain and the United States
- Lenin in October (Russian: Ленин в Октябре) (1937) – Soviet biographical drama film, made as Soviet-realist propaganda, portraying the activities of Lenin at the time of the October Revolution
- The Life of Emile Zola (1937) – biographical drama film about the 19th-century French author Émile Zola
- Parnell (1937) – biographical romantic drama film based on the life of Irish politician and Home Rule activist, Charles Stewart Parnell
- The Pearls of the Crown (French: Les Perles de la couronne) (1937) – French comedy film tracing the history of seven valuable pearls of the English Crown from the time of Henry VIII to the present day (1937)
- Peter the Great (Russian: Пётр Первый) (1937) – Soviet biographical drama film based on the life and activity of the Russian Emperor Peter I
- Pugachev (Russian: Пугачёв) (1937) – Soviet biographical drama film telling the story of Yemelyan Pugachev who pretended to be Peter III of Russia; he was one of several dozen impostors posing as Peter, and the most famous of them
- Purandaradasa (Kannada: ಪುರಂದರದಾಸರು) (1937) – Indian Kannada-language biographical film about Purandara Dasa
- Scipio Africanus: The Defeat of Hannibal (Italian: Scipione l'africano) (1937) – Italian historical propaganda film about Scipio Africanus from the time of his election as proconsul until his defeat of Hannibal at the Battle of Zama
- Sisters in Arms (French: Soeurs d'armes) – French spy drama film about Louise de Bettignies and Léonie Vanhoutte who formed an underground intelligence operation in German-occupied Belgium and Northern France during the First World War
- The Toast of New York (1937) – biographical comedy drama film depicting a fictionalized account of the lives of financiers James Fisk and Edward S. Stokes
- Victoria the Great (1937) – British historical film telling the story of Queen Victoria from her coronation, focused on her meeting and marriage to Prince Albert and the way they established shared responsibilities until his death
- Young Pushkin (Russian: Юность поэта) (1937) – Soviet biographical drama film portraying the youth of the Russian poet Alexander Pushkin

=== 1938 ===
- A Prussian Love Story (German: Preußische Liebesgeschichte) (1938) – Nazi German historical romance film depicting the love affair between Wilhelm I and Elisa Radziwill
- A Royal Divorce (1938) – British historical drama film portraying the complex relationship between Napoleon and his wife, Josephine Bonaparte from their first meeting until their divorce more than a decade later
- Adrienne Lecouvreur (1938) – French-German biographical drama film about the life of the eighteenth century actress Adrienne Lecouvreur
- The Adventures of Marco Polo (1938) – biographical adventure film telling the story of Marco Polo who travels to China, where he finds the Emperor Kublai Khan, court intrigue, danger, and unexpected love
- Alexander Nevsky (Russian: Алекса́ндр Не́вский) (1938) – Soviet historical drama film depicting the attempted invasion of Novgorod in the 13th century by the Teutonic Knights of the Holy Roman Empire and their defeat by Prince Alexander, known popularly as Alexander Nevsky
- Boys Town (1938) – biographical drama film based on Father Edward J. Flanagan's work with a group of underprivileged boys in a home/educational complex that he founded and named "Boys Town" in Nebraska
- The Buccaneer (1938) – biographical adventure film based on Jean Lafitte and the Battle of New Orleans during the War of 1812
- The Challenge (1938) – British drama film about the first ascent of the Matterhorn in 1865 by Edward Whymper
- The Childhood of Maxim Gorky (Russian: Детство Горького) (1938) – Soviet biographical film depicting Soviet writer Maxim Gorky's inauspicious early years as an orphan raised by conniving relatives
- The Defense of Volotchayevsk (Russian: Волочаевские дни) (1938) – Soviet historical drama film about the raid of Vladivostok during the Russian Civil War
- Ettore Fieramosca (1938) – Italian historical drama film based on the life of the 16th century condottiero Ettore Fieramosca
- Friends (Russian: Друзья) (1938) – Soviet biographical war film based on the life of Sergey Kirov
- Giuseppe Verdi (1938) – Italian biographical film portraying the life of the composer Giuseppe Verdi
- Gold Is Where You Find It (1938) – Western historical film set 30 years after the first California Gold Rush, when hydraulic mining sends floods of muddy sludge into the Sacramento Valley, destroying crops and homes, based on true events
- The Great Waltz (1938) – biographical film loosely based on the life of Johann Strauss II
- If I Were King (1938) – biographical historical film about medieval poet François Villon
- In Old Chicago (1938) – disaster musical drama film depicting the Great Chicago Fire of 1871
- Kościuszko at Racławice (Polish: Kościuszko pod Racławicami) (1938) – Polish historical drama film about the uprising led by Tadeusz Kościuszko, in particular the Battle of Racławice
- Life of St. Paul (1938) – biographical adventure miniseries about Paul the Apostle
- The Man with the Gun (Russian: Человек с ружьём) (1938) – Soviet historical drama film taking place during the October Revolution, when the army is approaching the army of General Krasnov
- Marie Antoinette (1938) – historical drama film based on the life of Marie Antoinette, from her betrothal to Louis XVI, through her time as the Queen of France, to her execution
- The Marseillaise (French: La Marseillaise) (1938) – French historical drama film about the French Revolution up to the autumn of 1792
- Pietro Micca (1938) – Italian historical war film portraying the life and death of Pietro Micca, who was killed in 1706 at the Siege of Turin while fighting for the Duchy of Savoy against France in the War of the Spanish Succession
- Rasputin (French: La Tragédie impériale) (1938) – French historical drama film depicting the rise and fall of the Russian mystic Grigori Yefimovich Rasputin, the advisor to the Romanov royal family
- Sixty Glorious Years (1938) – British biographical drama film depicting the life and reign of Queen Victoria
- Spirit of Youth (1938) – biographical sport film telling the story of the rise of boxer Joe Louis
- Suez (1938) – romantic drama film based on events surrounding the construction, between 1859 and 1869, of the Suez Canal, planned and supervised by French diplomat Ferdinand de Lesseps
- That Mothers Might Live (1938) – drama short film depicting a brief account of Hungarian physician Ignaz Semmelweis and his discovery of the need for cleanliness in 19th-century maternity wards
- Thayumanavar (Tamil: தாயுமானவர்) (1938) – Indian Tamil-language biographical drama film depicting the life story of Hindu Saint and Philosopher Thayumanavar who lived in the 18th century
- Yellow Jack (1938) – historical drama film following the events of the well-known "Walter Reed Boards", in which Major Walter Reed of the United States Army worked to diagnose and treat yellow fever (called "yellow jack") in Cuba in 1898–1900

=== 1939 ===
- Allegheny Uprising (1939) – historical adventure film loosely based on the historical event known as the Black Boys Rebellion, which took place in 1765 after the conclusion of the French and Indian War
- Cardinal Messias (Italian: Abuna Messias) (1939) – Italian historical drama film portraying the life of Guglielmo Massaia, a nineteenth-century Italian known for his missionary work in the Ethiopian Empire
- Confessions of a Nazi Spy (1939) – spy political thriller film based on a series of articles by FBI officer Leon G. Turrou, recounting his investigation of Nazi spy rings in the United States
- Drums Along the Mohawk (1939) – historical drama film portraying settlers on the New York frontier during the American Revolution
- The Empress Wu Tse-tien (Chinese: 武則天) (1939) – Chinese historical film based on the life of Wu Zetian, the only female emperor in Chinese history
- The Flying Irishman (1939) – biographical drama film about Douglas Corrigan's 1938 unofficial transatlantic flight in a dilapidated Curtiss Robin light aircraft
- Frontier Marshal (1939) – Western drama film depicting the life of Wyatt Earp
- Gjest Baardsen (1939) – Norwegian comedy drama film based on the life of the outlaw Gjest Baardsen
- Gorky 2: My Apprenticeship (Russian: В людях) (1939) – Soviet biographical film depicting Soviet writer Maxim Gorky's early adulthood and the struggles he faced
- The Great Victor Herbert (1939) – biographical musical film depicting the story of famous opera composer Victor Herbert
- The Immortal Heart (German: Das Unsterbliche Herz) (1939) – Nazi German historical biographical drama film about the inventor of the watch, Peter Henlein
- Immortal Waltz (German: Unsterblicher Walzer) (1939) – Nazi German historical drama film portraying the lives the Austrian composer Johann Strauss I and family
- Jesse James (1939) – Western film loosely based on the life of Jesse James, the outlaw from whom the film derives its name
- Juarez (1939) – historical drama film depicting the story of Mexican President Benito Juarez
- Lenin in 1918 (Russian: Ленин в 1918 году) (1939) – Soviet biographical drama film about the Russian Civil War after the October Revolution
- Let Us Live (1939) – crime drama film adapted from the 1936 Harper's Magazine story "Murder in Massachusetts" by Joseph F. Dinneen about a real criminal case
- The Life of Carlos Gardel (Spanish: La vida de Carlos Gardel) (1939) – Argentine musical film portraying the life of the French-born tango singer Carlos Gardel who became a popular film star in Argentina and the United States
- Lincoln in the White House (1939) – biographical historical film about Abraham Lincoln's first term of office, from his inaugural speech in 1861 to his delivery of the Gettysburg Address in 1863
- The Mad Empress (1939) – historical drama film depicting the 3-year reign of Maximilian I of Mexico and his struggles against Benito Juarez
- The Man in the Iron Mask (1939) – historical adventure film based on the French legend of the Man in the Iron Mask
- Man of Conquest (1939) – Western war film about the politician Sam Houston, focusing on his relationship with Andrew Jackson and his role during the Texas Revolution
- Manickavasagar (Tamil: மாணிக்கவாசகர்) (1939) – Indian Tamil-language film depicting the life story of Saint Manikkavacakar
- Minin and Pozharsky (Russian: Минин и Пожарский) (1939) – Soviet historical drama film about the Time of Troubles, Russia's struggle for independence led by Dmitry Pozharsky and Kuzma Minin against the Polish invasion in 1611–1612
- Nurse Edith Cavell (1939) – biographical war film depicting the story of Edith Cavell who went to German-occupied Brussels after the onset of the First World War
- The Private Lives of Elizabeth and Essex (1939) – historical romantic drama film based on the historical relationship between Queen Elizabeth I and Robert Devereux, 2nd Earl of Essex
- Pukar (Urdu: پُکار) (1939) – Indian Urdu-language historical film about Mughal emperor Jehangir's legendary justice and his inner conflict when his wife kills an innocent citizen by mistake
- The Real Glory (1939) – historical adventure film about the Moro Rebellion during the American occupation of the Philippines at the beginning of the 20th century
- Robert Koch (German: Robert Koch, der Bekämpfer des Todes) (1939) – Nazi German biographical propaganda film about the German pioneering microbiologist Robert Koch
- Shchors (Russian: Щорс) (1939) – Soviet biographical war film about the partisan leader and Ukrainian Bolshevik Nikolai Shchors
- Stanley and Livingstone (1939) – historical adventure film loosely based on the true story of Welsh reporter Sir Henry M. Stanley's quest to find Dr. David Livingstone, a Scottish missionary presumed lost in Africa, whom he finally met on November 10, 1871
- The Star Maker (1939) – biographical musical film based on the life of vaudevillian Gus Edwards
- Stepan Razin (Russian: Степан Разин) (1939) – Soviet drama film about Cossack leader Stenka Razin
- The Story of Alexander Graham Bell (1939) – biographical drama film about Alexander Graham Bell, inventor of the telephone
- The Story of Vernon and Irene Castle (1939) – biographical musical comedy based on the story of the dancing team (Vernon and Irene Castle) who taught the world to two-step
- Swanee River (1939) – biographical musical film about Stephen Foster, a songwriter from Pittsburgh who falls in love with the South, marries a Southern girl, then is accused of sympathizing with the Confederacy when the Civil War breaks out
- Thiruneelakantar (Tamil: திருநீலகண்டர்) (1939) – Indian Tamil-language film based on the life of Tirunilakanta Nayanar
- Tower of London (1939) – historical film based on the traditional depiction of Richard, Duke of Gloucester rising to become King of England in 1483 by eliminating everyone ahead of him
- Young Mr. Lincoln (1939) – biographical drama film about the early life of President Abraham Lincoln

== See also ==
- Docudrama
- List of films about the RMS Titanic
- List of historical drama films and series set in Near Eastern and Western civilization
