= Agnes Mapes =

American actress

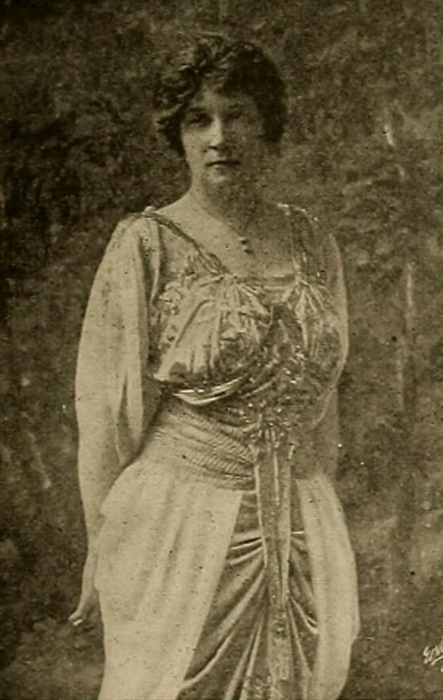
- Agnes Mapes c. 1914
- Occupation: Actress
- Years active: 1907-1925

Agnes Mapes (fl. 1907 - 1925) was an American actress who appeared in vaudeville performances and silent films throughout the 1900s and 1910s. Originally a part of the Crescent Theatre Stock Company, she was highly praised for her role in the 1907 production of The Holy City. She later worked for the Kalem Company and was part of some of its productions filmed in Ireland in 1911. Her multiple roles in 1912's A Fool There Was resulted from actors having to be swapped around which led to her playing the lead position and being applauded for her "fascinating and repellant" performance.

== Career ==
During the 1907 production of the play The Holy City, Mapes was asked to fill the role of Salome for the play's week in Philadelphia, as the several actresses who normally played the role were unavailable. The part includes a complex choreographed dance, but the dance instructor was too busy to teach her and could only show her the basic poses. At the same time, none of the dance partners were available to practice with her, forcing her to work on the dance on her own. Her performance, despite this, was highly praised by Philadelphia newspapers. This time period had her working with the Crescent Theatre Stock Company, though she did play some outsourced roles, such as in the 1909 play Are You a Mason? with the Gotham Company.

Mapes was part of the Kalem crew that traveled to Ireland on July 3, 1911, to make films after the success of the Kalem film The Lad from Old Ireland, acting as the wardrobe manager in addition to actress. After a series of tours throughout the highlands of Killarney, the Kalem crew produced 17 films of varying lengths, including The Colleen Bawn and Arrah-na-Pogue. The 1912 production of A Fool There Was had Mapes frequently play the role of the sister, but after the main actress became ill in November of that year, Mapes was moved to the primary role of the vampiric "Woman". Her characterization of the role was described by the St. Louis Globe-Democrat as "fascinating and repellant by turns".

By 1925, Mapes had become the plays department manager for Conational Plays Inc, helping promote plays to the executive staff for production.

== Theatre ==
- The Holy City (1907) as Salome
- Texas (1907) as Lady Cecelia Trevor
- The Dollar Mark (1908)
- The Sporting Duchess (1909) as Muriel, Countess of Desborough
- Robert Emmet (1909)
- Are You A Mason? (1909)
- The Fire Commissioner (1909) as the Commissioner's wife
- A Fool There Was (1912)
- Pilate's Daughter (1914) as Rebecca
- Hedda Gabler (1916) as Mrs. Elvsted

== Filmography ==
- The Lad from Old Ireland (1910) as Aileene's mother
- Hubby's Day at Home (1911) as Wifie
- The Colleen Bawn (1911) as Mrs. Cregan
- Arrah-na-Pogue (1911) as Fanny Powers, an adaptation of Arrah-na-Pogue
- Il trovatore (1914), a film adaptation of Il trovatore
- The Glory of Youth (1915)
- The Foolish Virgin (1916) as Ella Swanson
