= Are You a Mason? (1915 film) =

1915 film by Thomas N. Heffron

Are You a Mason? (aka:The Joiner)
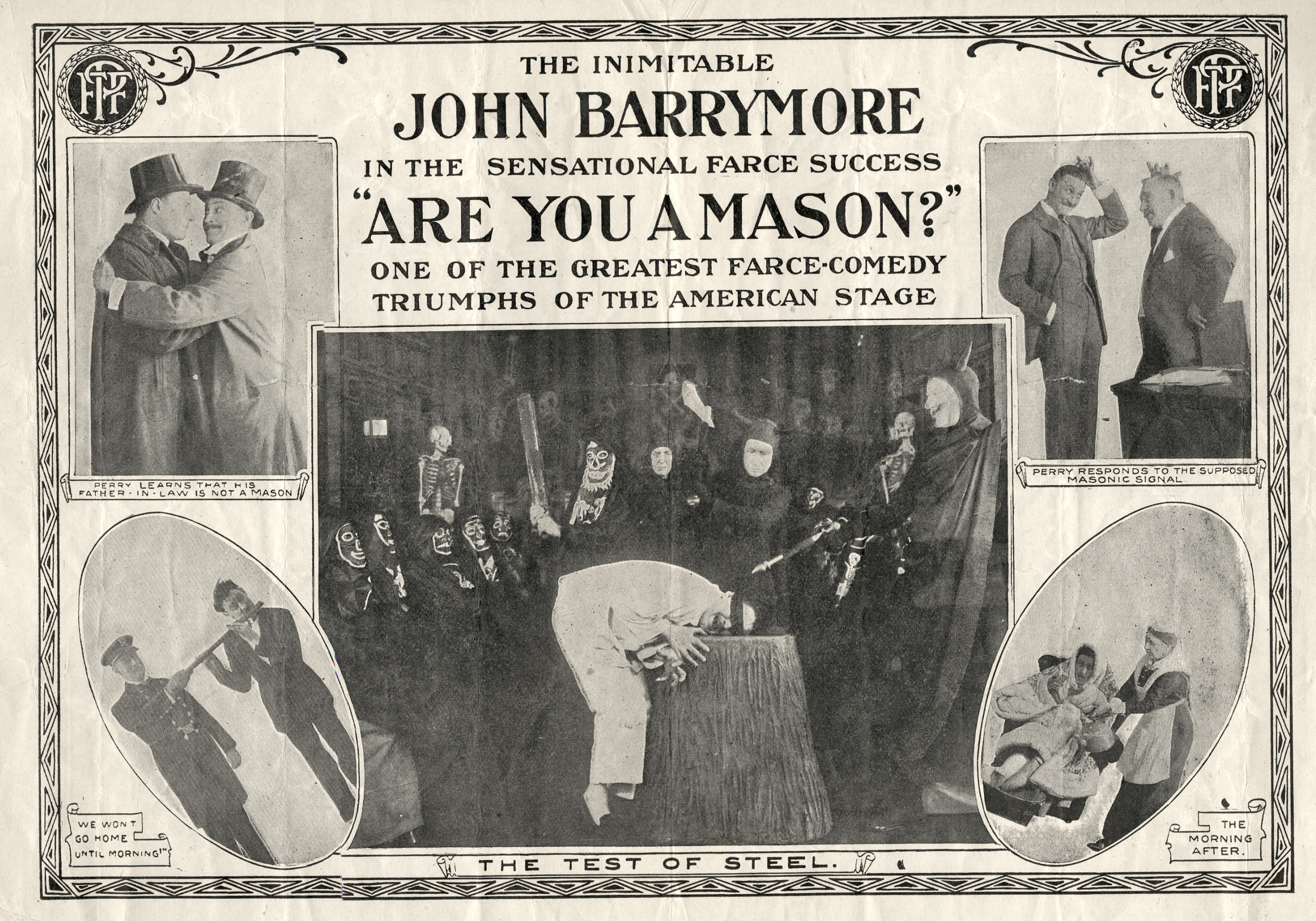
- Film poster
- Directed by: Thomas N. Heffron
- Screenplay by: Eve Unsell
- Based on: Are You a Mason? by Leo Ditrichstein
- Produced by: Adolph Zukor; Charles Frohman
- Starring: John Barrymore
- Production company: Famous Players Film Co.
- Distributed by: Paramount Pictures
- Release date: March 22, 1915
- Running time: 5 reels
- Country: United States
- Language: Silent (English intertitles)

Are You a Mason? is a 1915 American silent comedy film produced by Adolph Zukor (Famous Players Film Company) and Charles Frohman, and distributed through Paramount Pictures. Directed by Thomas N. Heffron, it starred John Barrymore as a young husband who pretends to join the Masons as an excuse to get out of the house. It was based on a 1901 play by Leo Ditrichstein.

This film is presumed lost.

== Plot summary ==
Frank Perry discovers that his wife desires him to become a Mason. Taking advantage of the opportunity, Perry goes out for several nights to carouse and have fun while telling his wife that he is undergoing initiation at the Masonic lodge. When his wife invites her father, a Grand Master of the Masons, for a visit, Frank goes to comedic lengths to avoid being found out. The farce is magnified by the circumstance that his father-in-law has also been lying about his Masonic association.

== Cast ==
- John Barrymore as Frank Perry
- Helen Freeman as Helen Perry
- Charles Dixon as Amos Bloodgood
- Harold Lockwood as Bob Trevors
- W. Dickinson as George Fisher
- Dodson Mitchell as Detective Ketchum
- Alfred Hickman as Billy
- Ida Waterman
- Charles Butler
- Jean Acker
- Lorraine Huling
- Kitty Baldwin

== Production ==
The film was based on a 1901 farce by Leo Ditrichstein, who in turn adapted it from a German play, Die Logenbrüder (The Freemason), by Curt Kraatz and Carl Laufs.

Are You a Mason? was Barrymore's third feature-length film as well as his third film under contract to Famous Players. Up and coming film hero Harold Lockwood had also appeared in Barrymore's earlier The Man from Mexico in 1914.

== Release and reception ==
Are You a Mason? was released on March 22, 1915.

Louella Parsons, writing for the Chicago Herald, praised the picture, and Barrymore in particular. The New York Dramatic Mirror called it a "screen comedy triumph", and found nothing in it to criticize. In Moving Picture World, reviewer Lynde Denig also liked the picture and thought that Barrymore improved on his earlier good performances.

The Variety reviewer was unimpressed, describing it as "a decidedly mild comedy" and saying that it had "innumerable opportunities for comedy situations, most of which have been sadly neglected"; the reviewer went on to credit Barrymore with whatever laughs the film was able to deliver.

It was re-released by Paramount in 1919 under their temporary re-issue banner The Success-Series, celebrating some of the company's major early first successes. A 1922 remake was planned for Roscoe "Fatty" Arbuckle but was dropped due to the Virginia Rappe murder scandal which ruined his career. The comedy was filmed again as a talkie in 1934.

== See also ==
- John Barrymore on stage, screen and radio
