= Are You a Mason? =

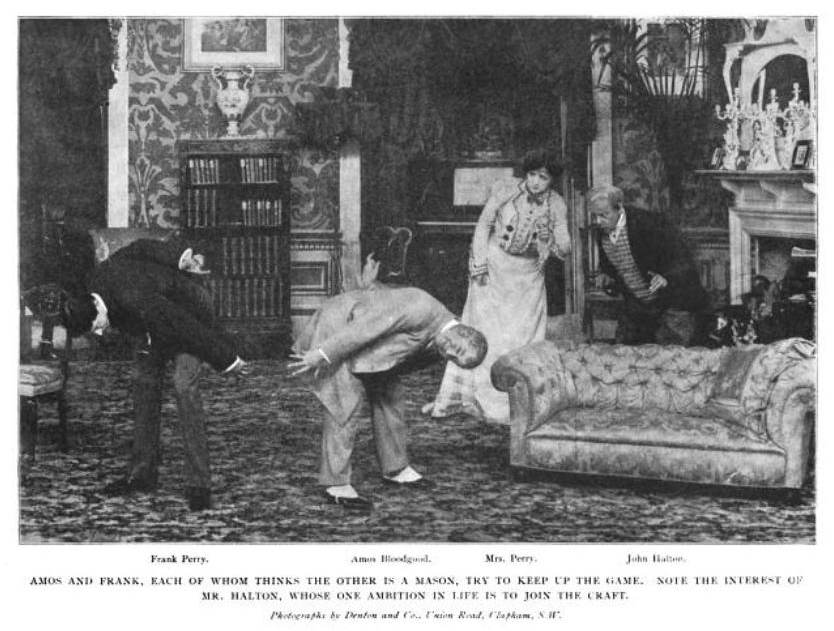
Scene from the 1901 production

Are You a Mason? is a farce in three acts by Leo Ditrichstein, who in turn adapted it from a German play, Die Logenbrüder (The Freemason), by Curt Kraatz and Carl Laufs. The play was performed at the Shaftesbury Theatre in 1901.

The play has been adapted for screen:

- Are You a Mason? (1915 film), an American silent comedy
- Are You a Mason? (1934 film), a British comedy

Agnes Mapes and Dora Booth appeared in the first production.

A 1922 adaptation was planned for Roscoe "Fatty" Arbuckle but was dropped due to the Virginia Rappe murder scandal.
