= Ellen Scanlan =

Irish murder victim in 1819

Ellen (Ellie) Scanlan (nee Hanley)
- Born: July 19, 1803
- Died: July 14, 1819 (aged 15)
- Known for: Inspiration for the play, movie and books Colleen Bawn

Ellen Scanlan, born Ellen Hanley, was an Irish murder victim. Born to a Limerick farming family in 1803, her murder at age 15 became the subject of books, plays, films, songs, and an opera, using the nickname given to her locally, "the Colleen Bawn", (an Anglicized spelling of the Irish Cailín Bán), which translates literally to "white girl", with "white" symbolically meaning purity, innocence, gentleness, or beauty. Thus the name can be interpreted as "the innocent maiden".

== Early life ==
Born in the village of Bruree, in Ireland, Ellen’s mother died when the girl was no more than six years old. Upon her father's remarriage, Ellen moved in with her uncle, a ropemaker who lived at Ballycahane, near Croom, County Limerick. Her beauty attracted the attention of John Scanlan, a member of the Anglo-Irish minor aristocracy, a former Royal Marine and a gambler, whose family lived in Ballycahane Castle, less than a mile from her uncle's home. Ellen was attracted to Scanlan both for his charming nature and the prospect of an elevated status. Their romance was well-known in the area and the subject of local gossip.

== Murder ==
When Ellen disappeared in June 1819, it was widely suspected that she had eloped with Scanlan. No marriage records exist, but it appears that Ellen and Scanlan may have been married in secret, perhaps informally, and that Ellen lived as his bride in Glan, a property of the Scanlan family on the opposite shore of the Shannon River. Within six weeks of the marriage, Scanlan's sister, who was unaware of the marriage to Ellen, allegedly proposed a match between Scanlan and the daughter of a wealthy nobleman. Scanlan hired his servant Stephen Sullivan to murder Ellen.

On the night of 14 July 1819, Sullivan convinced Ellen to share a drink with him. Both became intoxicated, and Sullivan persuaded Ellen to go rowing with him on the Shannon River. Once he had convinced the girl to join him in the boat, he shot her. He bound her body to a rock with a rope provided by Scanlan and threw her in the river.

On 6 September 1819, Ellen's bound body washed ashore near Money Point at Burrane, on the Clare coast. The rope and boat were linked to Scanlan, and a manhunt ensued. Due to an initial misunderstanding of the precise date of Ellen's death, the public was under the assumption that the girl had been murdered on her sixteenth birthday, 19 July, increasing the outrage and romanticization surrounding the murder.

Scanlan was almost immediately discovered, arrested, and made a full confession. His trial took place in March 1820. He was represented by Daniel O'Connell, a national hero in Ireland and a leading lawyer of the day. Nevertheless, in August of that year, Scanlan was found guilty. Local legend states that the horses that were to take Scanlan to the gallows refused to pull once Scanlan was placed in the wagon, therefore Scanlan was forced to walk the distance as the public jeered. He was hanged at Gallows Green, Garryowen, Limerick. However, the wealthy Scanlan family managed to contain the scandal, and the murder and execution were not well-known outside of the immediate area.

Sullivan eluded capture for nearly a year after Scanlan's execution, but was eventually found, tried, and hanged. In his confession, he fully implicated John Scanlan, and the story was reported by The Newgate Calendar, increasing its popularity.

== Memorial ==
Ellen is buried in the Burrane Cemetery near Kilrush, County Clare. The late Mrs. Reeves, of Bessborough House, erected a Celtic cross in her memory. It bore the following inscription: "Here lies the Colleen Bawn, Murdered on the Shannon, July 14th 1819. R.I.P."

During the Victorian era, the popularity of the play, opera and story about Colleen Bawn story saw both her original gravestone and the Celtic cross erected in her memory chipped away by souvenir hunters. In more recent times, a new monument to her was erected in Burrane Cemetery (close to the Killimer-Tarbert Ferry). The memorial features a bronze bust of Ellen, along with two small bronze reliefs, one depicting Ellen standing with John Scanlan, and the other showing a sailboat with Stephen Sullivan preparing to dispose of Ellen's body.

Ellen Scanlan was buried in the grave of Irish scholar Peter O'Connell, and a bronze plaque identifies both.

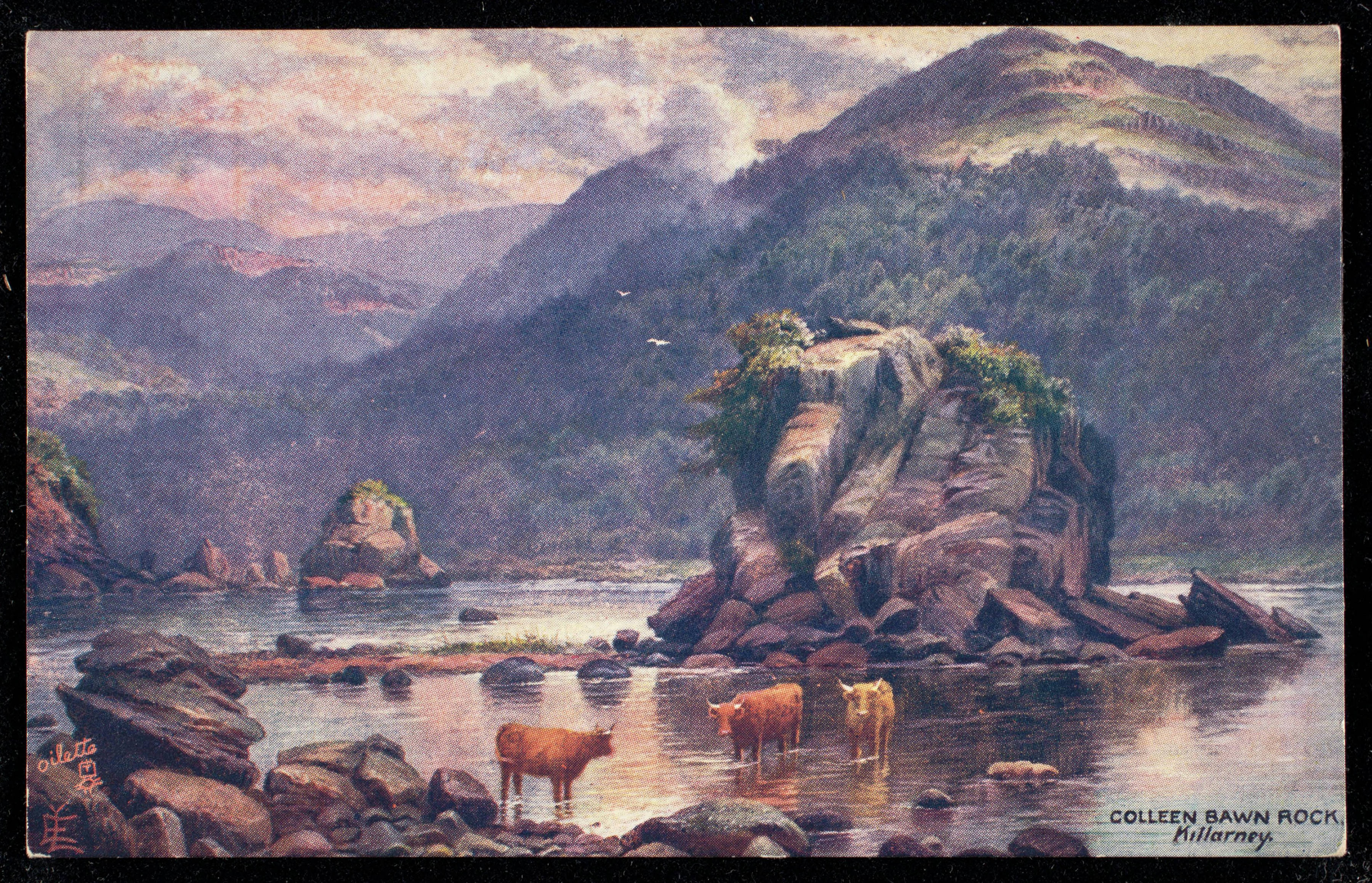
Colleen Bawn Rock

A large rock in Muckross Lake in County Kerry is known as the Colleen Bawn Rock. While the name of the stone appears to predate Ellen's murder, it has since been attributed as a memorial to her and is sometimes mistakenly assumed to be the place of her murder, the spot where her body was discovered, or her burial place.

== Works about her life ==
- Irish writer Gerald Griffin wrote a popular novel, The Collegians (1829), based on the story.
- The Colleen Bawn is mentioned by James Joyce in a satirical catalogue describing The Citizen in Ulysses [12.194].

Velasquez, Captain Nemo, Tristan and Isolde, the first Prince of Wales, Thomas Cook and Son, the Bold Soldier Boy, Arrah na Pogue, Dick Turpin, Ludwig Beethoven, the Colleen Bawn, Waddler Healy, Angus the Culdee, Dolly Mount, Sidney Parade, Ben Howth, Valentine Greatrakes, Adam and Eve, Arthur Wellesley, Boss Croker, Herodotus, Jack the Giantkiller, Gautama Buddha, Lady Godiva, The Lily of Killarney, Balor of the Evil Eye, the Queen of Sheba, Acky Nagle, Joe Nagle, Alessandro Volta, Jeremiah O’Donovan Rossa, Don Philip O’Sullivan Beare.

- The Colleen Bawn; or, The Brides of Garryowen: a domestic drama in three acts premiered on 27 March 1860. It was written by Dion Boucicault, a leading playwright of the English-speaking world for four decades in the 19th century, and largely based on Griffin's earlier novel (though Boucicault drastically changes the ending).
- Julius Benedict penned an opera, The Lily of Killarney, based on Boucicault's play. The opera premiered at Covent Garden Theatre, London on 10 February 1862. The opera enjoyed great popularity and is widely accepted to have spread knowledge of the murder case outside its native Ireland.
- The Colleen Bawn is a 1911 American silent film based on the murder and notable for being the first film shot by the Kalem Company. The film was restored by the Irish Film Institute and Trinity College Dublin in recognition of its historical significance to Irish cinema and culture.
- Two films, also titled The Colleen Bawn, were based on the play: a 1911 Australian production and a British one.
- A cocktail called the Colleen Bawn has existed since at least as 1903. While "Cailín Bán" is a common phrase in Ireland and has been widely applied, the cocktail is directly named for Ellen Scanlan, or more specifically, the film based on her murder.
