= The Wearing of the Green =

Traditional Irish song

"The Wearing of the Green"
A 1905 recording of "The Wearing of the Green" performed by J. W. Myers

"The Wearing of the Green" is an Irish street ballad lamenting the repression of supporters of the Irish Rebellion of 1798. It is to an old Irish air, and many versions of the lyric exist, the best-known being by Dion Boucicault. The song proclaims that "they are hanging men and women for the wearing of the green".

The revolutionary Society of United Irishmen adopted green as its colour, and supporters wore green-coloured garments, ribbons, or cockades. In some versions, the "green" being worn is shamrock rather than fabric.

== Versions ==
Many versions of the lyrics exist. The general format is that the narrator is a rebel who has left Ireland for exile and meets a public figure (Napper Tandy, in most versions), who asks for news from Ireland, and is told that those wearing green are being persecuted.

Halliday Sparling's Irish Minstrelsy (1888) includes the anonymous "Green upon the Cape", dated to 1798. This longer poem describes the narrator's journey into exile before reaching the elements common to later versions. The narrator is a croppy from Belfast who arrives in Paris and is questioned by "Boney" (Napoleon Bonaparte).

In an 1802 version published in Dundalk entitled "Green on my Cape", it is Robert Emmet who meets the narrator, in Brest. Versions from the 1840s and 1850s feature Napoleon.

The best-known version is by Dion Boucicault, adapted for his 1864 play Arragh na Pogue, or the Wicklow Wedding, set in County Wicklow during the 1798 rebellion. In the second verse, Boucicault's version recounts an encounter between the singer and Napper Tandy, an Irish rebel leader exiled in France. Boucicault claimed to have based his version on a half-remembered Dublin street ballad. His addition of the third and last verses is in notable contrast to the middle verse in advocating emigration to America rather than staying in defiance. Boucicault himself fled to New York after leaving his wife for a young actress.

Henry Grattan Curran (1800–76), son of John Philpot Curran, wrote a version of his own, and claimed the original was written in County Tipperary. Wellington Guernsey's version was published in 1866.

In the 1937 Hopalong Cassidy film, North of the Rio Grande, actor Walter Long's Irish character, Bull O'Hara, leads the singing of another version of the song. The lyrics in this version are lighthearted and celebrate the beauty of Ireland.

== Musical source ==
The tune of "The Wearing of the Green" was first published in The Citizen, or Dublin Monthly Magazine, vol. III, January–June 1841. The earliest melodic variant appeared four years later under the title "Up! For the Green" in James Duffy's The Spirit of the Nation (Dublin, 1845), p. 216. Other melodic versions exist in Alfred Moffat's The Minstrelsy of Ireland (London, 1897; p. 56) and Francis O'Neill's O'Neill's Music of Ireland (Chicago, 1903; p. 81, tune number 467).

== In popular culture ==
Gerald O'Hara sings this tune while escorting his daughters to the barbecue at Twelve Oaks in Chapter 5 of Margaret Mitchell's Gone with the Wind. The stranger known as "Namgay Dooly" sings something like these words in the short story "Namgay Doolyat", part of Rudyard Kipling's Life's Handicap.

== Recordings ==
Artists and groups to have recorded the song include John McCormack (1904, again in 1912), Judy Garland (1940), Patrick O'Malley (1961), The Kelly Family (1979), The Wolfe Tones (1985), Orthodox Celts (1997), and Irish Moutarde

== Allusions ==
Irish composer Wellington Guernsey (1817–1885) made a new version for voice and piano in 1866. Similarly, an arrangement of the melody with new words by Alfred Perceval Graves was written by Charles Villiers Stanford (1852–1924) in 1900.

Several 19th-century composers wrote piano arrangements of the tune, including Thomas Brown (1866), William Henry Goodban (1866), Fred Beyer (1875), and Willie Pape (1875).

The Franco-Irish composer Joseph O'Kelly (1828–1885) used the tune of "The Wearing of the Green" in his Air irlandais op. 58 (1877) for piano, consisting of a statement of the tune in piano arrangement, followed by two virtuoso variations.

Other songs which refer to "The Wearing of the Green" include "Monto", popularised by the Dubliners; and "Each Dollar A Bullet", by Stiff Little Fingers. Another 1798 ballad also entitled "The Wearing of the Green" references the more famous song in its chorus: 'Her faithful sons will ever sing "The Wearing of the Green."'

Songs sung to the same air include "The Rising of the Moon", whose subject is the same 1798 rising; "The Orange and the Green", about a mixed (Protestant–Catholic) marriage; and "Sae Will We Yet" by Scottish folk group The Corries.

"The Wearing of the Grey", a lament for the Confederate States Army, was published to the same tune in 1865, at the end of the American Civil War. Another Civil War song, “The Army of the Free”, was published at a similar time to the same tune.

In 1962 the comedic singer Allan Sherman used the tune for "Shake Hands With Your Uncle Max," a song about a struggling plastics salesman who is welcomed home after months on the road by the effusive and numerous members of his extended Jewish family. Although Sherman's parody is upbeat, the operatic close of his rendition clearly alludes to the dramatic ending of the version by John McCormack.
