= Arrah-na-Pogue =

1864 play in 3 acts by Dion Boucicault

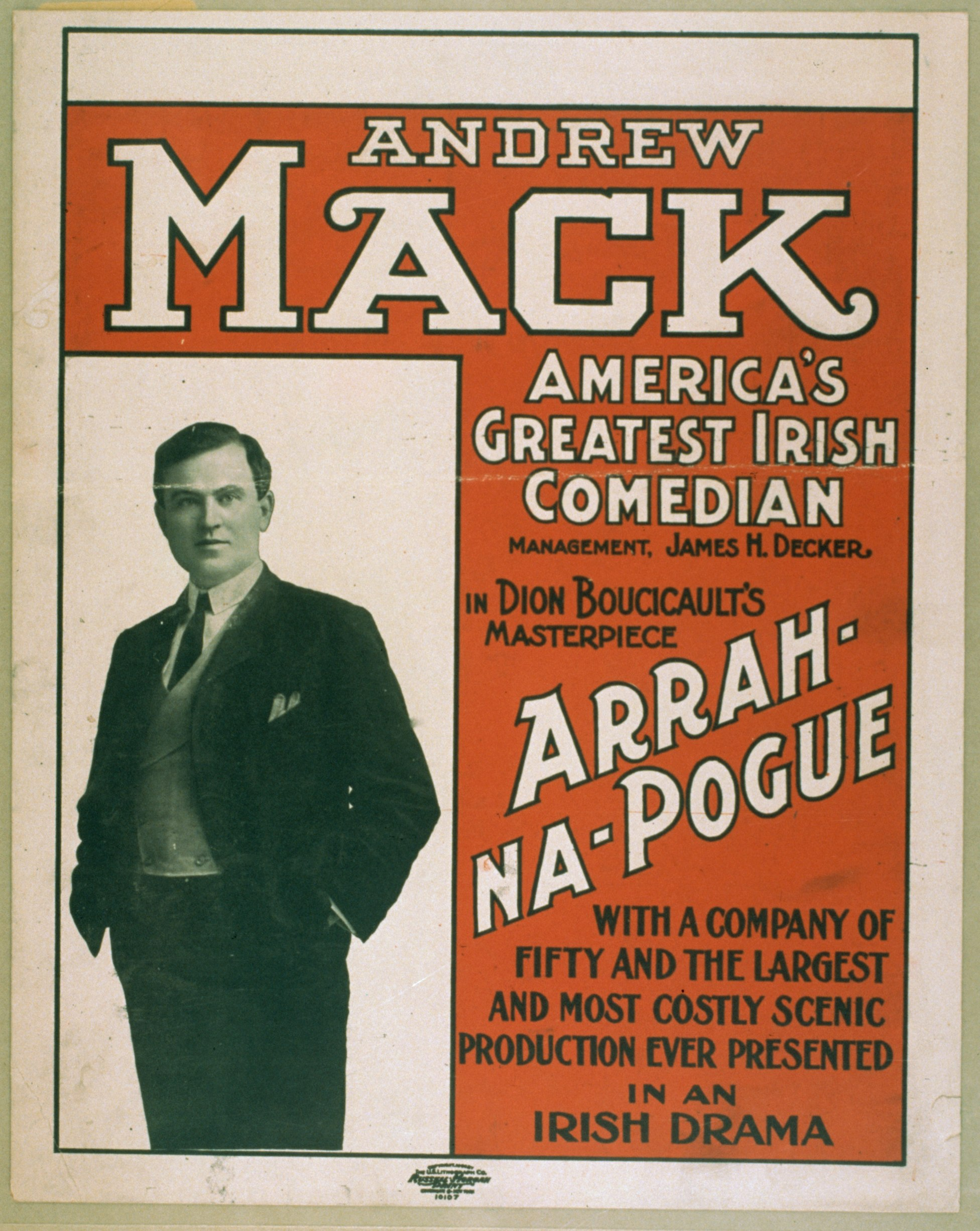
Lithograph poster for Arrah-Na-Pogue. (Title: Andrew Mack, America's greatest Irish comedian in Dion Boucicault's masterpiece, Arrah-Na-Pogue)

Arrah-na-Pogue, also known as Arrah-na-Pogue; or the Wicklow Wedding, is a play in 3 acts by Dion Boucicault. Along with The Colleen Bawn (1860) and The Shaughraun (1874), it is considered one of the three major Irish plays penned by Boucicault. Set during the Irish Rebellion of 1798, the play popularized the street ballad The Wearing of the Green; a rendition of which was included in the play with lyrics by Boucicault. It has had an enduring place in the canon of dramatic literature on the stage internationally, and has been adapted into other media.

== Plot ==
In the aftermath of the 1798 Rising, rebel Beamish Mac Coul is hiding out with his foster sister, Arrah Meelish. Beamish and Fanny Power plan to marry and flee the country for France the next day.

Beamish robs the corrupt rent collector Michael Feeny, and gives some of the money to Arrah as a dowry - she is to marry next day. But Feeny calls on Arrah with evil intentions; provoked, she shows him some of the money, which he recognises, and as he flounces out he sees Beamish hiding. The local magistrate, Colonel O'Grady, is in love with Fanny (Beamish's fiancée). She has said she'll marry the magistrate if he gets a pardon for Beamish. But now, she tells him she's going to marry Beamish, and asks him to destroy the pardon.

Fanny discovers the reason that Arrah is known as "Arrah-na-Pogue" - Arrah of the Kiss: she smuggled a letter to Beamish, her foster brother, when he was imprisoned after the Rising, by concealing it in her mouth and passing it to him during a kiss. On learning this she becomes enraged and jealous.

Arrah marries her fiancé Shaun - at the wedding he sings The Wearing of the Green, a ballad mourning the failure of the Rising. O'Grady leads a party of British soldiers in, accompanied by the jealous Fanny. Beamish escapes through the roof. Arrah is arrested for the theft, but Shaun claims to have been the robber, to save his new wife's life. He is imprisoned in Dublin.

Arrah tells O'Grady that she will marry him, on condition that he will save Shaun's life. But in Dublin, Shawn is sentenced to death despite O'Grady's evidence.

Beamish, O'Grady and Fanny all visit the Secretary of State. Shaun is pardoned, as is Beamish. Fanny and Beamish are together again; O'Grady rushes to prevent Shaun's execution. Fanny goes to the jail, and climbs to the battlements to sing to Shaun, who squeezes through the cell window and climbs the sheer wall to be with her. Feeny comes out and is thrown from the battlements. O'Grady arrives with the pardon, and all is resolved.

== History ==
Arrah-na-Pogue premiered on November 7, 1864, at the Theatre Royal, Dublin. The cast included Boucicault, Samuel Johnson, John Brougham and Samuel Anderson Emery among others. The work had its first staging in London's West End at the Princess's Theatre, London on 22 March 1865.

The United States premiere of the play was presented in New York City at the Broadway theatre Niblo's Garden on July 21, 1865, where it ran for 68 performances. It has been revived twice on Broadway; first as Niblo's Garden in 1869, and then at the Fourteenth Street Theatre in 1903.

The play was mounted at the Abbey Theatre in 2010. The play was performed Off-Broadway in New York City by the Storm Theatre Company at the Theatre of the Church of Notre Dame in 2012.

The play's central character, Shaun the Post, was both an inspiration and object of parody for James Joyce's character Shaun the Postman in his 1939 novel Finnegans Wake.

== Adaptations ==
- Arrah-na-Pogue (1911, silent film)
- Shaun the Post (1924, opera by librettist R. J. Hughes and composer Harold R. White under the pseudonym "Dermot Macmurrough")
- Arrah-na-Pogue, (1940, radio play by NBC Radio, broadcast February 4, 1940 with Richard Gordon as Shaun the Post)

== Bibliography ==
- Guy Beiner (2007). Remembering the Year of the French: Irish Folk History and Social Memory. University of Wisconsin Press. ISBN 9780299218232.
- Deirdre McFeely (April 12, 2012). "Music, myth, and censorship in Arrah-na-Pogue". Dion Boucicault: Irish Identity on Stage. Cambridge University Press. pp. 29–58. ISBN 9781107378254.
- James Fisher (2015). Historical Dictionary of American Theater: Beginnings. Rowman & Littlefield Publishers. ISBN 9780810878334.
- James MacKillop, ed. (1999). Contemporary Irish Cinema: From The Quiet Man to Dancing at Lughnasa. Syracuse University Press. ISBN 9780815605683.
- Chris Morash, Nicholas Grene, ed. (2005). Irish Theatre on Tour. Carysfort Press. ISBN 9781904505136.
- Dion Boucicault (September 6, 1984). Peter Thomson (ed.). Plays by Dion Boucicault. Cambridge University Press. ISBN 9780521239974.
- Chrissie Van Mierlo (2017). James Joyce and Catholicism: The Apostate's Wake. Bloomsbury Publishing. ISBN 9781472585967.
