= Arrah-na-Pogue (film) =

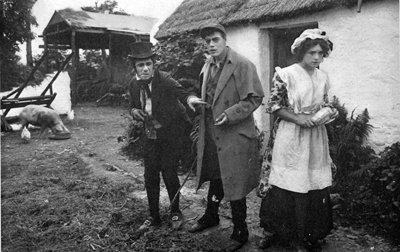
- From left to right: Robert Vignola, Sidney Olcott and Gene Gauntier.
- Directed by: Sidney Olcott
- Written by: Gene Gauntier
- Based on: Arrah-na-Pogue by Dion Boucicault
- Produced by: Sidney Olcot
- Starring: Gene Gauntier; Jack J. Clark; JP McGowan; Robert Vignola
- Cinematography: George K. Hollister
- Music by: Walter C. Simon
- Production company: Kalem Company
- Distributed by: General Film Company
- Release date: December 4, 1911
- Country: United States
- Languages: Silent film (English intertitles)

Arrah-na-Pogue is a 1911 American silent film produced by Kalem. It is based on the 1864 play of the same name by Dion Boucicault. It was directed by Sidney Olcott with Gene Gauntier, Jack J. Clark, JP McGowan and Robert Vignola. Gene Gauntier adapted a play written by Dion Boucicault, Arrah-na-Pogue, an Irish phrase that can be translated as "Arrah (a girl's name) of the Kiss".

== Plot ==
Set during the Irish rebellion of 1798, the play tells a story of love and loyalty under pressure. The action takes place over a forty-eight hour period.

The first act opens at night, with the rebel Beamish Mac Coul waylaying and robbing the cowardly rent-collector Michael Feeny. Beamish is preparing to leave the country with Fanny Power, whom he plans to marry the following night before they embark for France together. He gives part of the stolen money as a wedding present to his foster-sister Arrah Meelish, who has been sheltering him at her peril, unbeknown to her fiancé, Shaun, and to Fanny.

Feeny, who wants Arrah for himself, visits her the next morning - the morning of her wedding day; she rejects him and he swears to see her humbled in time. Arrah is provoked into showing Feeny the money, who recognizes it as his own; he then catches a glimpse of Beamish concealed in the barn. Next we discover that Colonel O'Grady, the local magistrate, is in love with Fanny and has procured a pardon for Beamish. This was Fanny's condition for marrying him, but now that she and Beamish are planning to flee together, she asks him to tear it up. However, Fanny learns that Arrah got her nickname "Arrah of the kiss" when she previously helped Beamish escape from prison by concealing a message in her mouth and passing it to him in a kiss; she begins to doubt Beamish's feelings for herself. Enter Feeny to report that he has been robbed, and that Arrah has the money and is giving shelter to the rebel Mac Coul.

Meanwhile, Arrah and Shaun have gotten married and a party is held in the barn, which culminates in Shaun singing "The Wearing of the Green". When a contingent of English soldiers arrives under the command of Major Coffin and accompanied by the O'Grady, Fanny and Feeney, Beamish, who had been hiding in the loft, escapes through a trapdoor in the roof. Arrah is forced to produce the money, but refuses to explain, even when evidence of Beamish's stay in the barn is found. Arrah is arrested. The first act ends with Shaun confessing to the robbery to save Arrah's life.

Believing Beamish to have been unfaithful to her, Fanny does not meet him at the appointed place for their wedding. Beamish learns what has happened and resolves to give himself up to the Secretary of State in Dublin and get Shaun and Arrah pardoned. Fanny again offers O'Grady her hand, this time on the condition that he will save Shaun's life.

Shaun is visited in prison by Fanny and Arrah. He learns the identity of the man Arrah was protecting, and rejoices to see his implicit trust in her vindicated, putting Fanny's lack of faith to shame. The climax of the second act is an uproarious court scene, during which the O'Grady unsuccessfully tries to convince the court of Shaun's innocence. Shaun is sentenced to death for conspiracy to rebellion and robbery.

In Act 3, the Secretary of State is visited by a succession of people on Shaun's behalf - Beamish Mac Coul, the O'Grady, and Fanny. Beamish and Shaun are pardoned, Beamish and Fanny reunited, and the O'Grady rushes off to prevent Shaun's execution. Meanwhile, Arrah has been refused permission to visit Shaun and has gone to the battlements above Shaun's cell from where she sings to him. Shaun manages to climb out of the window of his cell and begins to scale the sheer ivy covered wall to get to her. Feeny has followed Arrah, who rejects him again. He spots Shaun and threatens to raise the alarm; they struggle, Shaun reaches the top, and Feeny is thrown off the battlement. The O'Grady arrives with Shaun's pardon, and general happiness ensues.

== Cast ==
- Gene Gauntier - Arrah-na-Pogue
- Robert Vignola - Feeney
- Sidney Olcott - Shaun the Post
- Agnes Mapes - Fanny Powers
- Jack J. Clark - Beamish McCoul
- Arthur Donaldson - O'Grady
- JP McGowan - Secretary of State
- Anna Clark
- Harry O'Brien
- Thomas P. Glancy
- George H. Hardin
- Charles Lully

== Production notes ==
The film was shot in Beaufort, County Kerry, Ireland and in Flesk Castle, Killarney
