= Hubby's Day at Home =

- Directed by: Sidney Olcott
- Produced by: Sidney Olcott
- Starring: Jack J. Clark; Agnes Mapes
- Cinematography: George K. Hollister
- Production company: Kalem Company
- Distributed by: General Film Company
- Release date: July 12, 1911
- Running time: 990 ft
- Country: United States
- Languages: Silent film (English intertitles)

Hubby's Day at Home is an American silent film produced by Kalem Company and directed by Sidney Olcott with Agnes Mapes and Jack J. Clark in the leading roles.

== Cast ==
- Agnes Mapes - Wifie
- Jack J. Clark - Hubby
