= Robert Lyons Marshall =

Irish writer and clergyman (1887–1971)

The Reverend Robert Lyons Marshall
- Born: March 11, 1887; Drumragh, Omagh, County Tyrone, Ireland
- Died: 23 March 1971 (aged 84)
- Spouse: Isobel Marion Scott

Robert Lyons Marshall (11 March 1887 – 23 March 1971), known by the pen name Tullyneil, was an Irish writer and clergyman. Marshall was from Sixmilecross in County Tyrone, Ireland, where he was a Presbyterian minister, a writer and poet, and professor of English and history at Magee College, Derry.

== Biography ==
Marshall was the elder brother of William Forbes Marshall, the so-called 'Bard of Tyrone'.

In 1908, he and William entered the Presbyterian College in Belfast to study for the ministry; both went on to become ministers.

His short stories in At Home in Tyrone and some of his poems were written in the local Ulster English dialect. He wrote under the name ‘Tullyneill’.

He was the Presbyterian minister of Maghera from 1914 to 1932. He also worked as a professor of English and Catechetics at Magee College.

He was a fellow of the Royal Historical Society.

== Family ==
He was married to Isobel Scott.

== List of works ==
- The Heart of Tyrone (short stories) The Quota Press, 1940
- At Home in Tyrone (short stories) The Quota Press, 1944
- Rhymes of Tyrone (poems) The Quota Press, 1945
