= Gerald Griffin =

Irish-born novelist and playwright

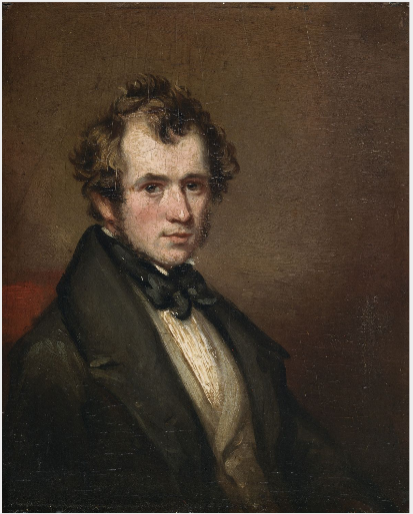
- by Richard Rothwell
- Born: 12 December 1803; Limerick, Ireland
- Died: 12 June 1840 (aged 36); Cork, Ireland

Signature
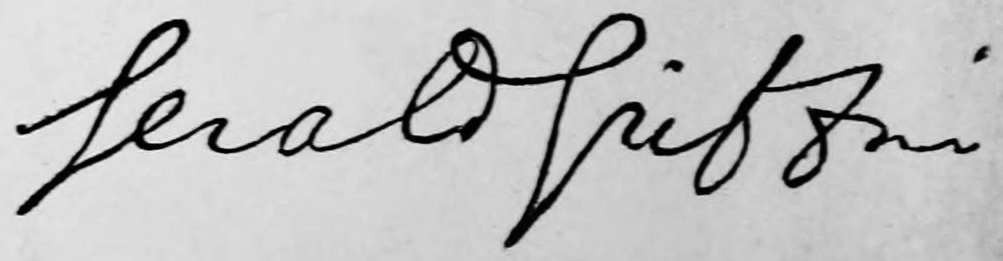

Gerald Griffin (Irish: Gearóid Ó Gríofa; 12 December 1803 – 12 June 1840) was an Irish-born novelist, poet and playwright. His novel The Collegians was the basis of Dion Boucicault's play The Colleen Bawn. Feeling he was "wasting his time" writing fiction, he joined the Christian Brothers, a Catholic religious congregation founded by Edmund Ignatius Rice to teach the children of the poor.

== Biography ==
=== Early life ===
Gerald Griffin was born in Limerick in 1803, the youngest son of thirteen children of a substantial Catholic farming family. Patrick Griffin, his father, also made a living through brewing, and he participated as one of Grattan's Irish Volunteers. His mother came from the ancient Irish family of the O'Brien's, and first introduced Gerald to English literature. When he was aged seven, Griffin's family moved to Fairy Lawn, a house near Loghill, County Limerick, which sat on a hill above the bank of the Shannon estuary, about twenty-seven miles from Limerick. Here Griffin had an idyllic childhood and received a classical education. "When free from his books he was wont to roam through the neighbouring countries, so rich in ruins, which told him of the past glories of his native land. At that time, too he got an insight into the customs of the people and became familiar with the popular legends and folk-tales which he later worked into his stories."

=== London ===
In 1820 the family at Fairy Lawn was broken up. The parents with several of the children emigrated to America and settled in the state of Pennsylvania. Gerald, with one brother and two sisters, was left behind under the care of his elder brother William, a practising physician in Adare, County Limerick. Griffin met John Banim in Limerick city. Inspired by the successful production of Banim's play Damon and Pythias (1821), Griffin moved to London in 1823; he was nineteen years of age. After an unsuccessful attempt at becoming a playwright, Griffin endured years of poverty in London, managing only to scrape by through writing reviews for periodicals and newspapers. At the end of two years he obtained steady employment in the publishing house as reader and reviser of manuscripts, and in a short time became a frequent contributor to some of the leading periodicals and magazines. Griffin's early Literary Gazette pieces vividly described the rural setting of his childhood; recounted Irish folklore; translated the Celtic Irish language for the English readers; and, as Robert Lee Wolff has observed, "waxed richly sardonic about Irishmen who tried to be more English than the English."

=== Return ===
Griffin's "Holland-Tide;" or, Munster Popular Tales was published by Simpkin and Marshall in 1827. "Holland-Tide" is a collection of seven short stories, all of which are told in the house of a hospitable Munster farmer during All Hallows' Eve in Munster. "Holland-Tide" established his reputation and he returned to Ireland, where he wrote Tales of the Munster Festivals in Pallaskenry to which his brother William had moved.

Experience led Griffin to modify his expectations in relation to literary work, and, with a view to the legal profession, he entered as a law student at the University of London, but in a short time removed to Dublin for the study of ancient Irish history, preparatory to his work "The Invasion", which was published in 1832. This work had a good sale and was highly praised by scholars, but never became popular.

=== Christian brother ===
With the exception of a tour through Scotland and a short trip on the Continent, he lived with his brother, keeping up to some extent his literary labours. By 1833, Griffin was increasingly concerned that "he was wasting his time", and began to devote himself to teaching the poor children of the neighbourhood. In 1838, Griffin burnt all of his unpublished manuscripts and joined the Congregation of Christian Brothers, a Catholic religious order which has as its special aim the education of children of the poor. Writing to an old friend he said "he felt a great deal happier in the practice of this daily routine than he ever did while roving about the great city, absorbed in the modest project of rivalling Shakespeare and throwing Scott in the shade". In June, 1839, he was transferred from Dublin to Cork, where he died of typhus fever at the age of thirty-six.

== Legacy ==
However, his play Gisippus was produced posthumously at the Drury Lane Theatre on February 23, 1842 by William Macready, and it ran to a second edition in print.

One of Griffin's most famous works is The Collegians, a novel based on a trial that he had reported on, involving the murder of a young Irish Catholic girl (Ellen Hanley) by a Protestant Anglo-Irish man (John Scanlon). The novel was later adapted for the stage as The Colleen Bawn by Dion Boucicault.

He has a street named after him in Limerick City and another in Cork City, Ireland. Loughill/Ballyhahill GAA club in west Limerick play under the name of Gerald Griffins.

== Works ==
- Tales of the Munster Festivals (1827)
- The Collegians (1829)
- Tales Illustrative of the Five Senses (1830)
- Poetical Works and Tragedy of Gisippus
- The Rivals; and, Tracy's Ambition (1830)
- The Invasion (1832)
- Tales of My Neighbourhood (1835)
- The Duke of Monmouth (1836)
- The Fate of Cathleen: a Wicklow Story (1841)
- Tales of the Jury Room (1842)

== Selected bibliography ==
- Griffin, D. The Life of Gerald Griffin, Vol. I (London: 1843). online.
