= William Forbes Marshall =

Poet and linguist from Northern Ireland

- Born: May 1, 1888
- Died: 1959 (aged 70–71)
- Occupation: Poet

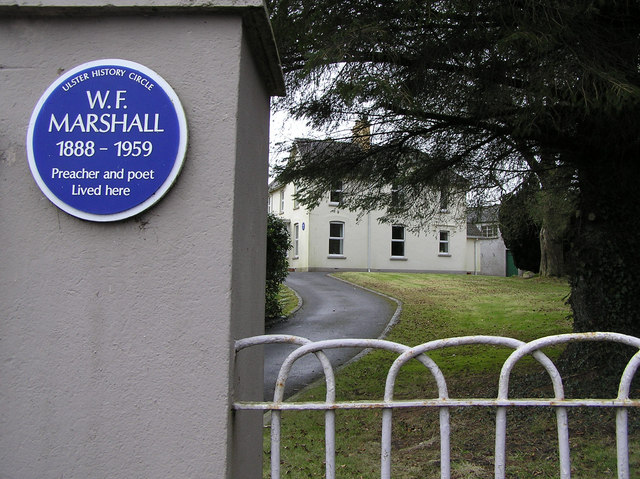
Blue plaque

William Forbes Marshall (8 May 1888 – 27 January 1959) was an Irish poet and Presbyterian minister from Sixmilecross, County Tyrone, Ireland. He was the younger brother of the Rev. Robert Lyons Marshall, professor, poet and dialect writer.

Marshall's father was principal teacher at Sixmilecross National School, where he was first educated. He was further educated at Royal School Dungannon (for which Marshall wrote the school song) and then Queens College Galway. He completed his law degree in 1910 and was ordained as a minister in 1916.

He served as a Presbyterian minister at Castlerock, County Londonderry for over thirty years. Known as "The Bard of Tyrone", Marshall composed poems such as Hi Uncle Sam, Me an' me Da (subtitled Livin' in Drumlister), Sarah Ann and Our Son.

In 1932 he became a lecturer of Elocution at Magee College Londonderry.

Marshall was a leading authority on Mid Ulster English (the predominant dialect of Ulster), and broadcast a series on the BBC entitled Ulster Speech. A prolific writer and poet, he also wrote Ulster Sails West, a book on people from Ulster who settled in North America during the 18th century.

== Family ==
In 1916 he married Susan McKee of Belfast; they had three children.

== Legacy ==
His poem ‘R.S.D.’ is now the school song for the Royal School Dungannon, and is sung there on special occasions.

The W.F. Marshall Summer School is an annual event held at Magee College in Londonderry in honour of Marshall.

== Works ==
- Ulster Sails West (1944)
- Planted by a River (1948)
