= James Gill (Irish cricketer) =

Irish cricketer (1911–2000)

Personal information
- Full name: James Rupert Gill
- Born: 24 September 1911; Dublin, Ireland
- Died: 18 October 2000 (aged 89); Blackrock, Dublin, Ireland
- Batting: Right-handed

Domestic team information
- Years: Team
- 1948: Ireland

Career statistics
Competition	First-class
Matches	1
Runs scored	106
Batting average	106.00
100s/50s	1/–
Top score	106
Catches/stumpings	–/–
- Source: Cricinfo, 2 January 2022

James Rupert Gill (24 September 1911 in Dublin, Ireland – 18 October 2000 in Dublin) was an Irish cricketer. A right-handed batsman, he played just once for Ireland, a first-class match against the MCC in August 1948, scoring 106 in the Ireland first innings.

He later served as president of the Irish Cricket Union in 1961.
