= Hi Uncle Sam =

Poem by William Forbes Marshall

Hi Uncle Sam! is a poem by Irish poet Rev. William Forbes Marshall. It asks of Americans that they remember the input and support of immigrants from Ulster on the United States throughout the American Revolution.

The poem was published in Marshall's book, Ulster Sails West, which was published in 1911. A mural in Newtownards displays a verse of the poem. The poem was also put to music and recorded by the Ulster Scots Folk Orchestra and verse was used by the Public Record Office of Northern Ireland in their Emigration Series publication.

The "Uncle Sam" of title refers to the later personification of the United States.

== Lyrics ==
For historical references and context, click on the highlighted words or phrases.

Hi Uncle Sam!
When freedom was denied you,
And imperial might defied you,
Who was it stood beside you
At Quebec and Brandywine?

And dared retreats and dangers,
Red-coats and Hessian strangers,
In the lean, long-rifled Rangers,
And the Pennsylvania Line!

Hi! Uncle Sam!
Wherever there was fighting,
Or wrong that needed writing,
An Ulsterman was sighting
His Kentucky gun with care:

All the road to Yorktown,
From Lexington to Yorktown,
From Valley Forge to Yorktown,
That Ulsterman was there!

Hi! Uncle Sam!
Virginia sent her brave men,
The North paraded grave men,
That they might not be slavemen,
But ponder this with calm:

The first to face the Tory,
And the first to lift Old Glory,
Made your war an Ulster story:
Think it over, Uncle Sam!
