= Are You a Mason? (1934 film) =

1934 British film by Henry Edwards

- Feature on the film in Picture Show (2 March 1935)
- Directed by: Henry Edwards
- Written by: Leo Ditrichstein; Emanuel Lederer; H. Fowler Mear
- Produced by: Julius Hagen
- Starring: Sonnie Hale; Robertson Hare; Davy Burnaby; Gwyneth Lloyd
- Cinematography: Sydney Blythe
- Release date: August 1934
- Running time: 70 minutes
- Country: United Kingdom
- Language: English

Are You a Mason? is a 1934 British comedy film directed by Henry Edwards and starring Sonnie Hale, Robertson Hare, Davy Burnaby and Gwyneth Lloyd. It was written by Leo Ditrichstein, Emanuel Lederer and H. Fowler Mear, and made at Twickenham Studios.

== Preservation status ==
The British Film Institute National Archive holds a collection of ephemera but no film or video materials.

== Premise ==
Two men pretend to be freemasons to impress each other.

== Cast ==
- Sonnie Hale as Frank Perry
- Robertson Hare as Amos Bloodgood
- Davy Burnaby as John Halton
- Gwyneth Lloyd as Eva
- Bertha Belmore as Mrs Bloodgood
- Joyce Kirby as Lulu
- Lewis Shaw as George Fisher
- Michael Shepley as Emest Monison
- Davina Craig as Annie
- May Agate as Mrs Halton

== Reception ==
Film Weekly wrote: "Sonnie Hale and Robertson Hare well 'teamed' in theatrical but hilarious adaptation of the famous stage farce about husbands to tending to be Masons in order to fool their wives. Plenty of broad fooling, though the fun is more in dialogue than in action."

Kine Weekly wrote: "Resourceful fooling of the cast achieves the maximum out of typical farce situations and help disguise a somewhat wordy script. ... Sonnie Hale's spirited and resourceful comedy is well suited to the role of Frank, and he misses few chances. Robertson Hare has seldom been so well served with opportunities, and his Bloodgood is in the best Robertson Hare vein of hen-pecked martyrdom."

The Daily Film Renter wrote: "Abundant store of laughs as plot ties itself in knots, before deftly unravelling in uproarious climax. Teaming of Sonnie Hale and Robertson Hare great success, with latter excelling in role allowing full scope to his peculiar individuality. ... Between them, they carry the picture without a slip, being happily cast in roles that fit them perfectly."
