= The Colleen Bawn =

1860 play by Dion Boucicault

The Colleen Bawn, or The Brides of Garryowen
- Original language: English
- Written by: Dion Boucicault
- Characters: Hardress Cregan; Myles na Coppaleen; Danny Mann; Mr Corrigan; Father Tom; Kyrle Daly; Eily O'Connor; Anne Chute; Mrs Cregan
- Genre: Melodrama
- Setting: Garrowen, rural Ireland

Premiere
- Date: 27 March 1860
- Place: Laura Keene's Theatre, New York City

The Colleen Bawn, or The Brides of Garryowen is a melodramatic play written by Irish playwright Dion Boucicault. It was first performed at Laura Keene's Theatre, New York, on 27 March 1860 with Laura Keene playing Anne Chute and Boucicault playing Myles na Coppaleen. It was revived at the Adelphi Theatre in 1885. It was most recently performed in Dublin at the Project Arts Centre in July and August 2010 and in Belfast by Bruiser Theatre Company at the Lyric Theatre in April 2018. Several film versions have also been made.

== Origins ==
While in America, Boucicault explored the turmoil that was boiling up in the new nation and wrote about it. As a result of this, in 1859 he wrote, produced, and acted in a very famous antislavery play called The Octoroon (Rowell 173). He and his wife played the leads and, after the first week of runs, only earned about 1500 dollars between the two of them. Boucicault thought this was a bit unfair since he had done the majority of the work for the production and asked for a larger cut for both him and his wife. Consequently, they both found themselves cut from the show entirely and jobless.

One evening, not long after the Octoroon incident, in the spring of 1860, Boucicault was walking home when he felt the sudden urge to venture into a bookstore he had passed a hundred times before. He came out moments later with a Gerald Griffin novel, The Collegians which was written in 1829. He was so excited that the first thing he did when he got home was to write Laura Keene a letter stating that he was writing a play based on The Collegians and that he would have the first act to her by the end of the weekend. He told her that they should start the rehearsal/build process immediately and he would finish the play as they rehearsed, so basically, the definition of theatre on the fly. Thus, Boucicault took his playwriting back to his Irish roots and The Colleen Bawn came to life and opened at the Laura Keene Theatre in May 1860.

The novel was based on the true story of Ellen Scanlan (née Hanley), a fifteen-year-old girl who was murdered on 14 July 1819. She was recently married to John Scanlan, but when he saw that she would not be accepted into his family he persuaded his servant, Stephen Sullivan, to kill her. Sullivan took her out on the River Shannon near Kilrush, County Clare where he killed her with a musket, stripped her and dumped her body in the river, tied to a stone. Her body was washed ashore six weeks later at Moneypoint. Both men had fled but Scanlan was found first and arrested for murder. At his trial, he was defended by Daniel O'Connell. He was found guilty and hanged at Gallows Green, the place of execution on the Clare side of the Shannon. Sullivan was apprehended shortly afterwards, confessed and was also hanged.

== Characters ==
Jessie Millward in costume as Anne Chute (1885)

- Hardress Cregan – an Irish landowner fallen on hard times
- Myles na Coppaleen (from the Irish Myles na gcapaillín, 'Myles of the ponies') – a poacher and moonshine brewer
- Danny Mann – loyal servant to Hardress; a hunchback
- Father Tom – an alcoholic Roman Catholic priest
- Kyrle Daly – a servant of the Cregans, in love with Anne
- Mr Corrigan – a villainous local magistrate who aims to seize the Cregan estate
- Eily O'Connor, the Colleen Bawn (from the Irish cailín bán, "fair/pale girl") – a peasant girl, Hardress's secret wife
- Anne Chute, the Colleen Ruaidh (from the Irish cailín ruadh, "red-haired/ruddy girl") – a wealthy heiress
- Mrs Cregan – the mother of Hardress

== Plot ==
The Colleen Bawn captivated audiences with its interwoven character plots and overall story. The play begins with Hardress Cregan planning his trip across the lake to see his wife, Eily O’Connor, with his noble follower Danny Mann. It is only known to the two of them and the two caretakers of Eily that the pair is married. During this conversation Hardress's dear friend, Kyrle Daly, and mother, Mrs. Cregan, enter. Mrs. Cregan immediately explains to Kyrle that Hardress is to marry their cousin Anne Chute, trying to convince him that his love for Anne is futile and that he should move on. After this exchange, the mortgage holder of the Cregan land, Mr. Corrigan, enters and converses with Mrs Cregan about her payment options. In order to save their estate, she is given an ultimatum: either have her son marry Anne, whom he obviously does not love, or marry Mr. Corrigan.

The play then switches focus to the love that is burgeoning between Anne and Kyrle despite Mrs. Cregan's warnings. After Kyrle exits, Danny appears and convinces Anne that Kyrle's love for her is false and that he is, in fact, wed to another woman, posing Hardress's reality as Kyrle's. This convinces her to go around the lake and try to catch Kyrle in the act of rowing across to this supposed 'other woman' - in reality, it is really Hardress that she sees, who is going across the lake to see his wife.

The play then switches back to Hardress as he enters the house in which he has placed Eily, well away from anyone who would notice his regular comings and goings. Hardress is angered upon entering the home by Eily's peasant ways and speech, then infuriated further when he finds out that a man, Myles-Na-Coppaleen, who has loved Eily for as long as he can remember, is visiting her along with her other two caretakers. Hardress then leaves in a fit of rage, leaving Eily to mourn and wonder if she will ever see him again. As Eily is doing so, Anne arrives and witnesses this episode, and talks to Eily about what she believes is the work of Kyrle. She leaves none the wiser, giving up on Kyrle, convinced that the best thing for her is to marry Hardress.

"Colleen Bawn Rock" near Killarney, designated in the Victorian period as the 'location' of Eily's murder.

The action then switches back to Hardress, who is boating back home with Danny. Danny, who is willing to do anything for Hardress, offers to kill Eily to rid Hardress of his plight, so that he may marry Anne and use her family money to keep his estate. He tells Hardress to give him one of his gloves if he wishes Danny to commit the act. Hardress sternly refuses, still loving Eily and knowing that it would be an unspeakable crime if committed. After arriving home, Hardress immediately retires to his room, leaving Danny and Mrs. Cregan to converse about the offer that Danny had made Hardress. Mrs. Cregan follows after Hardress, finds his gloves, and takes one back to Danny. Danny wrongly believes that Hardress had agreed to give him the glove, and, seeking only to obey his master, takes off in his boat to fetch Eily for slaughter.

Danny arrives at Eily's home and convinces her that Hardress wants to meet her on a secluded cliff. She obeys, only to find that it is just her and Danny. After a failed attempt to retrieve her marriage license, Danny pushes her off the cliff. Immediately after, a shot is heard and we see Danny crumple to the earth. Unbeknownst to Danny, Myles leaps into the lake and saves Eily, whom he loves.

The truth then begins to unravel. On hearing of Eily's death, Hardress agrees to marry Anne, but during the wedding Mr. Corrigan, believing Hardress to be behind the murder, brings soldiers to the Cregans' estate demanding that they turn over Hardress. During this confrontation, Myles and Eily show up just in time and disprove all the charges against Hardress. Eily and Hardress stay together, Anne gives the Cregans the money they need to save their land and runs off with Kyrle, happily in love.

== Adaptations ==
=== Opera ===
Sir Julius Benedict composed his opera The Lily of Killarney from a text provided by Boucicault and John Oxenford based on The Colleen Bawn. It opened at the Royal Opera House, Covent Garden, on 8 February 1862 and remained a highly regarded and popular opera throughout the Victorian era. In Kobbé's Complete Opera Book, first published in 1922, it still merited a full summary of the plot, which remains in the current edition.

=== Film ===
The Colleen Bawn (1911), directed by Sidney Olcott

- In 1911 the play was adapted into two films: an American version directed by Sidney Olcott, and an Australian one directed by Gaston Mervale.
- In 1924, a British edition was made, directed by W.P. Kellino.
- In 1929 the play was made into a film, Lily of Killarney directed by George Ridgwell.
