= The Colleen Bawn (1911 American film) =

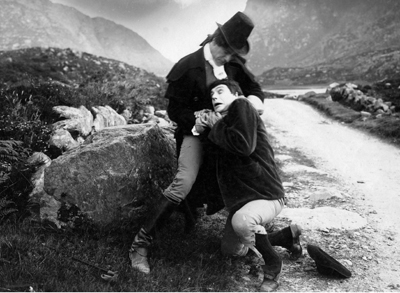
- J. P. McGowan (left, as Hardress Cregan) and Sidney Olcott (Danny Mann)
- Directed by: Sidney Olcott
- Written by: Gene Gauntier
- Based on: play The Colleen Bawn by Dion Boucicault
- Starring: Gene Gauntier; J. P. McGowan; Sidney Olcott
- Cinematography: George K. Hollister
- Production company: Kalem Company
- Release date: October 16, 1911
- Running time: Three reels
- Country: United States
- Language: English

The Colleen Bawn (1911)

The Colleen Bawn is a 1911 American silent romantic drama film based on the 1860 play of the same name. A secret marriage leads to murder. The story is based on the actual 1819 murder of 15-year-old Ellen Scanlan.

== Cast ==
- Gene Gauntier as Eily O'Connor, the "Colleen Bawn"
- J.P. McGowan as Hardress Cregan
- Sidney Olcott as Danny Mann
- Jack J. Clark as Myles na Copaleen
- Alice Hollister as Anne Chute
- Arthur Donaldson as Father Tom
- Robert G. Vignola as Mr. Corrigan
- Agnes Mapes as Mrs. Cregan
- Anna Clark as Sheelah

== Production ==
The film was shot in Beaufort, County Kerry, Ireland, during the summer of 1911.

== Preservation ==
A 1914 re-release print of the film is held by the National Archives of Canada, and the George Eastman Museum Motion Picture Collection has one reel.
