= The Colleen Bawn (1924 film) =

1924 British film by W. P. Kellino

- Directed by: W. P. Kellino
- Written by: Dion Boucicault (play); Eliot Stannard
- Starring: Henry Victor; Colette Brettel; Stewart Rome; Gladys Jennings
- Cinematography: Basil Emmott
- Production company: Stoll Pictures
- Distributed by: Stoll Pictures
- Release date: January 1924
- Running time: 6,400 feet
- Country: United Kingdom
- Languages: Silent; English intertitles

The Colleen Bawn is a 1924 British silent drama film directed by W. P. Kellino and starring Henry Victor, Colette Brettel and Stewart Rome. It is an adaptation of the 1860 Irish play The Colleen Bawn by Dion Boucicault.

== Plot ==
In Ireland a poor aristocrat hires a half-wit to drown his secret wife so he can wed an heiress.

== Cast ==
- Henry Victor – Hardress Cregan
- Colette Brettel – Eily O'Connor
- Stewart Rome – Myles na Coppaleen
- Gladys Jennings – Anne Chute
- Clive Currie – Denny Mann
- Marie Ault – Sheelah
- Marguerite Leigh – Mrs. Cregan
- Aubrey Fitzgerald – Sir Patrick Chute
- Dave O'Toole – Mike

== Bibliography ==
- Low, Rachael. History of the British Film, 1918–1929. George Allen & Unwin, 1971.
