= The Colleen Bawn (1911 Australian film) =

- Directed by: Gaston Mervale
- Based on: play by Dion Boucicault
- Starring: Louise Carbasse
- Production company: Australian Life Biograph Company
- Release date: 25 September 1911 (Melbourne)
- Running time: 4,000 feet
- Country: Australia
- Languages: Silent film; English intertitles

The Colleen Bawn is a 1911 Australian silent film directed by Gaston Mervale starring Louise Lovely. It is adapted from a popular melodrama by Dion Boucicault.

It is considered a lost film.

== Plot ==
Hardess Cregan is an impoverished Irish aristocrat whose mother wants him to marry Anne Chute, an heiress, in order to restore the family fortunes. However he falls in love and marries a peasant girl, Eily O'Connor (Louise Lovely). Hardess' servant Danny (James Martin) tries to murder the girl but she is rescued by a villager and hidden away. Thinking she is dead, Hardess is about to marry Anne and is about to be arrested for Eily's murder when she reappears. Hardress is released, Eily is accepted by Mrs Cregan, Anne and Kyrle are reconciled and Anne offers to pay off the Cregans' debt.

== Production ==
A cliff and a cave on Sydney harbour were used for the scene of the attempted murder and the rescue of the colleen. The rest of the movie was shot in the studio of Australian Life Biograph Company in Manly.

== Release ==
A British version of the same play, shot in Ireland, appeared in cinemas the same year.

== Cast ==
- Louise Carbasse as Eily O'Connor
- James Martin as Danny Mann
- Mervyn Barringont
