= Harry Beresford =

English-American actor (1863–1944)

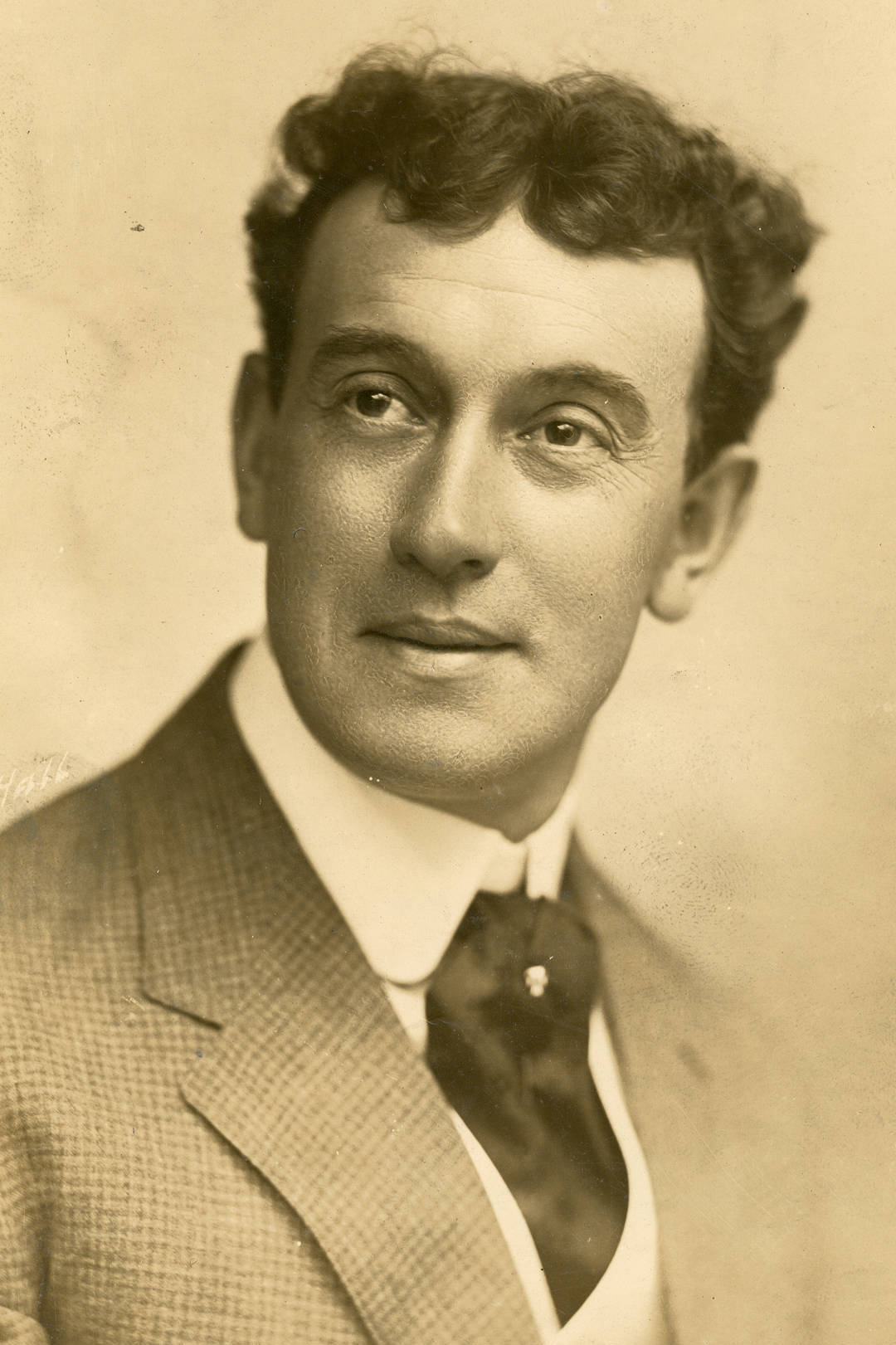
- Beresford in 1909
- Born: Henry William Walter Horseley Beresford; 4 November 1863; London, England
- Died: 4 October 1944 (aged 80); Los Angeles, California, U.S.
- Resting place: Forest Lawn Memorial Park, Glendale, California
- Other name: Harry J. Morgan
- Occupation: Actor
- Years active: 1880–1938
- Spouses: Emma Dunn (m. 1897; div. 1909): Edith Wylie (m. 19??)
- Children: 1

Henry William Walter Horseley Beresford (4 November 1863 – 4 October 1944) was an English-born actor on the American stage and in motion pictures. He used the professional name Harry J. Morgan early in his career.

== Career ==
Harry Beresford began his acting career in 1885, as a member of the chorus of Little Jack Sheppard at the Gaiety Theatre, London. After moving to the United States in 1886, he performed throughout the country in repertory theatre and with various touring companies—including his own—for the next 30 years. His first major Broadway theatre success was in 1919, in Boys Will Be Boys, which was soon followed by a starring role in Shavings (1920). In August 1922, he created the role of the alcoholic Clem Hawley in Don Marquis's comedy The Old Soak, a character Beresford made famous and played for two years. He won praise for his character performances in the Broadway productions of Stolen Fruit (1925) and The Perfect Alibi (1928).

Between 1926 and 1938, Beresford appeared as a supporting actor in more than 50 Hollywood films, including Doctor X (1932), The Sign of the Cross (1932), Dinner at Eight (1933), I Cover the Waterfront (1933), David Copperfield (1935) and Follow the Fleet (1936). He made his final film appearance in 1938, and received original story credit for the 1939 horse racing film, Long Shot.

== Personal life ==
Beresford was born in London 4 November 1863, to Henry George and Sarah Christie. His professional name was Harry J. Morgan at the time of his first marriage, to actress Emma Dunn, on 4 October 1897, in Chicago. They divorced on 10 February 1909, in New York City, and Dunn was awarded sole custody of their young daughter, Dorothy. Beresford married actress Edith D. Wylie, who had appeared opposite him in the play, The Other House. They were married for the remainder of his life.

Dunn, who likewise worked in Hollywood pictures in her later years, recalled testing for the role of a bullied wife in a 1935 film. When the casting director said she was too small for the part, she asked to be seen beside the actor who would play her husband—and discovered it was Harry Beresford. In 1936, columnist Jimmie Fidler reported that Beresford, then aged 72, had collapsed while working on an RKO Pictures soundstage. Unconscious for two hours, he was cared for by Dunn, who happened to be working on a set nearby.

Beresford died 4 October 1944, at his home in Toluca Lake, Los Angeles, of a heart ailment. He was interred at Forest Lawn Memorial Park.

== Theatre credits ==
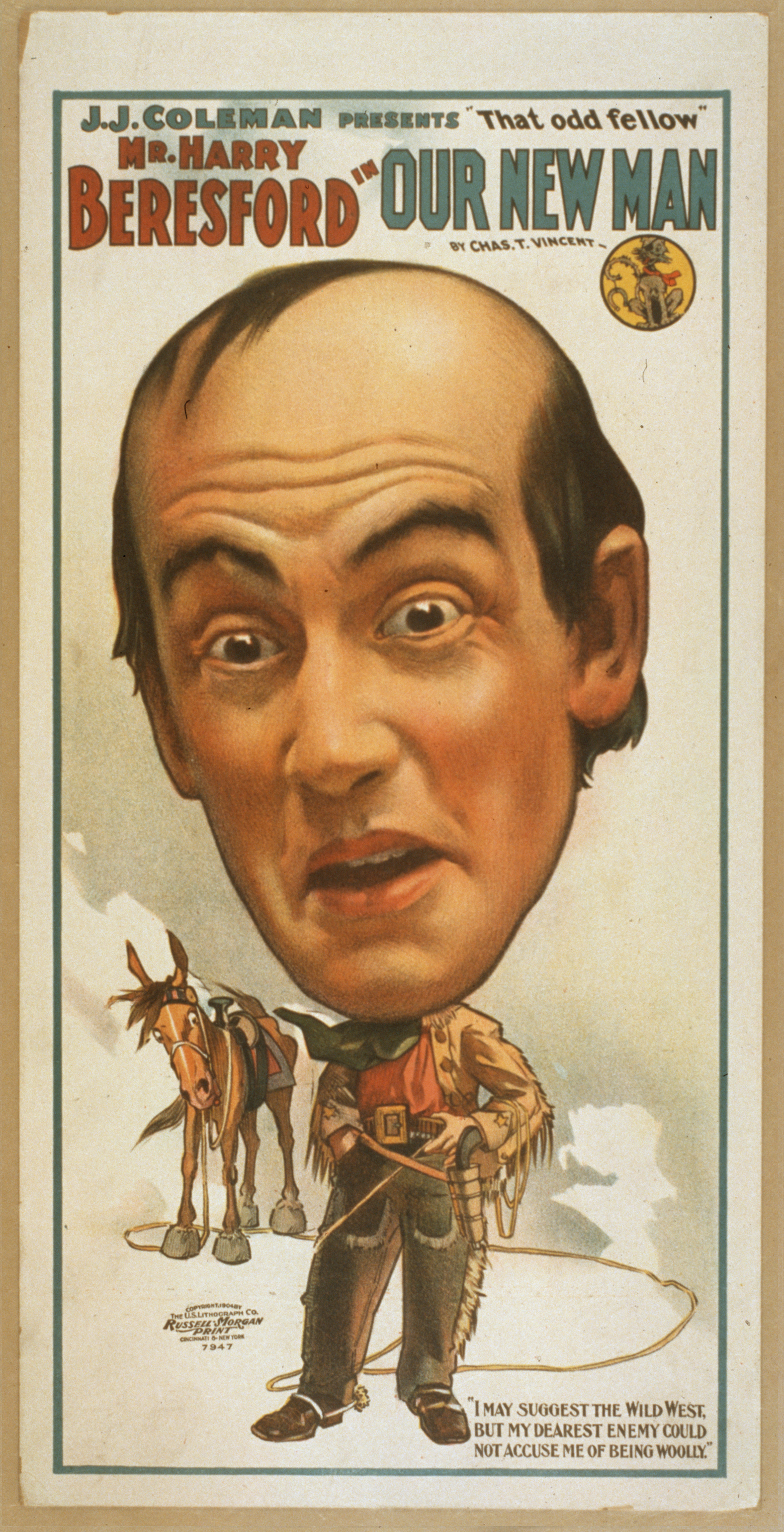
Theatrical poster for Harry Beresford in Our New Man (c. 1904)

Date	Title	Role	Notes
December 1885 –	Little Jack Sheppard	Chorus member	Gaiety Theatre, London; debut
November 1893 –	Walker, London	Andrew McPhail	National tour including several weeks at the Grand Opera House, Chicago
30 November – 6 December 1902	The Wrong Mr. Wright	Mr. Sites	National tour beginning at Morosco's Burbank Theatre, Los Angeles
13 October – November 1919	Boys Will Be Boys	Peep O'Day	Belmont Theatre, New York City
16 February – June 1920	Shavings	J. Edward Winslow	Knickerbocker Theatre, New York City
22 August 1922 – August 1923	The Old Soak	Clem Hawley	Plymouth Theatre, New York City
June 1924	She Stoops to Conquer	Aminadab	Empire Theatre, New York City
1924	Out-a-Luck		Touring production
February 3 – February 1925	The Undercurrent	Jason Mills	Cort Theatre, New York City
7 October – December 1925	Stolen Fruit	Ballou	Eltinge 42nd Street Theatre, New York City
27 November 1928 – July 1929	The Perfect Alibi	P. C. Ballet	Charles Hopkins Theatre, New York City
3 December 1929 – July 1930	Michael and Mary	P. C. Tuff	Charles Hopkins Theatre, New York City

== Filmography ==
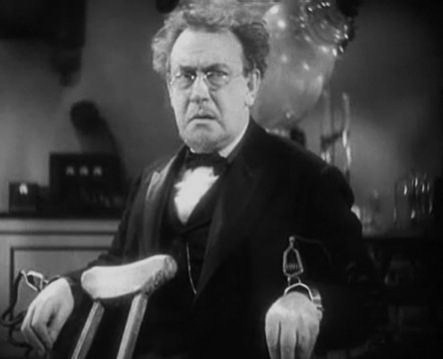
Harry Beresford in Doctor X (1932)

Year	Title	Role	Notes
1926	The Quarterback	Elmer Stone	Film debut
1931	Charlie Chan Carries On	Kent	
1931	Finn and Hattie	Street cleaner	
1931	Heaven on Earth	Captain Lilly	
1931	Scandal Sheet	Arnold	
1931	The Secret Call	Frank Kelly	
1931	Sob Sister	Pa Stevens	
1931	Sooky	Mr. Willoughby	
1931	Up Pops the Devil	Mr. Platt	
1932	Dance Team	Herbert Wilson	
1932	Doctor X	Dr. Duke	
1932	Forgotten Commandments	Priest	
1932	High Pressure	Dr. Rudolph	
1932	The Match King	Christian Hobe	
1932	Scandal for Sale	Brownie	
1932	The Sign of the Cross	Flavius	
1932	So Big	Adam Ooms	
1932	The Strange Love of Molly Louvain	Taxi driver	
1932	Two Seconds		
1933	Bondage		
1933	Bureau of Missing Persons	The Man	
1933	College Coach	Professor	
1933	Dinner at Eight	Fosdick	
1933	Ever in My Heart	Eli	
1933	I Cover the Waterfront	Old Chris	
1933	Little Women	Doctor Bangs	
1933	The Mind Reader	Blaney	
1933	Murders in the Zoo	Professor Evans	
1933	Night Flight	Roblet	
1934	Cleopatra	Soothsayer	
1934	Fashions of 1934	Bookseller	
1934	The Friends of Mr. Sweeney	Claude	
1934	The Little Minister	John Spens	
1934	The Merry Frinks	Mr. Brumby	
1935	Anna Karenina	Matve	
1935	David Copperfield	Dr. Chillip	
1935	A Dog of Flanders	Sacristan	
1935	I Found Stella Parish	James	
1935	I'll Love You Always	Henry Irving Clegg	
1935	Page Miss Glory	Kimball	
1935	Seven Keys to Baldpate	Lige Quimby	
1936	Follow the Fleet	Captain Hickey	
1936	Grand Jury	Tom Evans	
1936	In His Steps	Davidson	
1936	Klondike Annie	Brother Bowser	
1936	Postal Inspector	Ritter	
1937	The Go Getter	M. M. Baker	
1937	The Prince and the Pauper	The Watch	
1937	She Asked for It	Mr. Switch	
1937	She's No Lady	Uncle John	
1937	They Won't Forget	Confederate Soldier	
1938	Newsboys' Home	O'Dowd	Final film
1939	Long Shot	—	Original story
