= The Old Soak =

1926 film by Edward Sloman

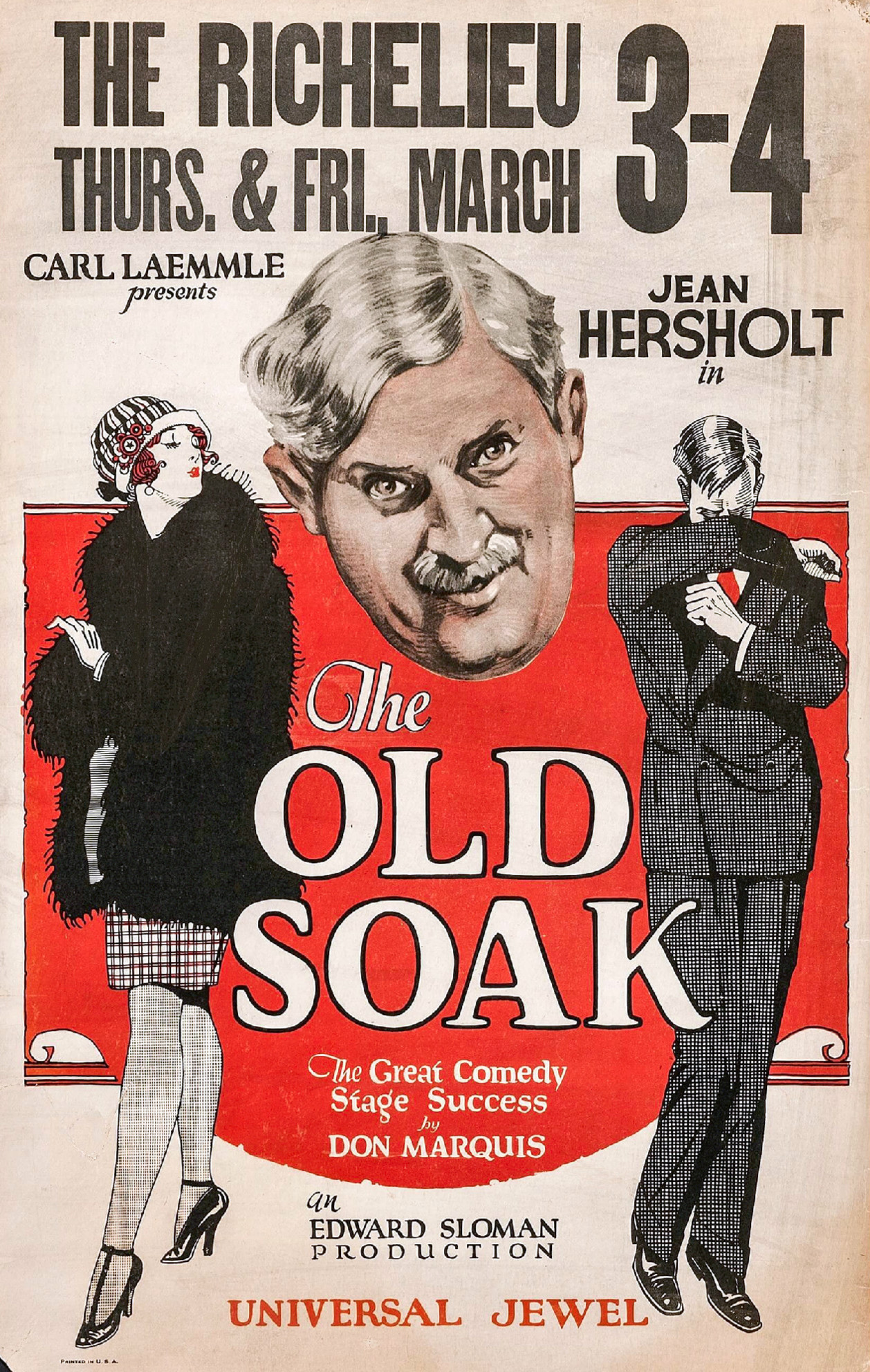
- Theatrical poster
- Directed by: Edward Sloman
- Written by: Charles Kenyon (adaptation)
- Screenplay by: Charles Kenyon
- Based on: The Old Soak by Don Marquis
- Starring: Jean Hersholt; George J. Lewis; June Marlowe
- Cinematography: Jackson Rose
- Distributed by: Universal Pictures
- Release date: October 24, 1926
- Running time: 80 minutes
- Country: United States
- Language: Silent (English intertitles)

The Old Soak is a 1926 American silent comedy crime film directed by Edward Sloman. The film stars Jean Hersholt, George J. Lewis, and June Marlowe, and is based on a 1922 Broadway play of the same title by Don Marquis. The play was later adapted into the 1937 release The Good Old Soak starring Wallace Beery.

== Cast ==
- Jean Hersholt as Clement Hawley Sr.
- George J. Lewis as Clemmy Hawley
- June Marlowe as Ina Heath
- William V. Mong as Cousin Webster
- Gertrude Astor as Sylvia De Costa
- Louise Fazenda as Annie
- Lucy Beaumont as Mrs. Hawley
- Adda Gleason as Lucy
- Tom Ricketts as Roue
- George Siegmann as Al
- Arnold Gray as Shelly Hawley (credited as Arnold Gregg)

== Preservation ==
The Old Soak is now presumed to be a lost film. However, a 16mm reduction positive print may exist in a private collection.

== See also ==
- Gertrude Astor filmography
