= Philip Goodman =

Philip Goodman may refer to:

- Philip Goodman (producer) (1885–1940), American publisher and theatrical producer
- Philip H. Goodman (1914–1976), American politician in Maryland
- Philip S. Goodman (1926–2015), American screenwriter, producer, and director
