= USS Crowley =

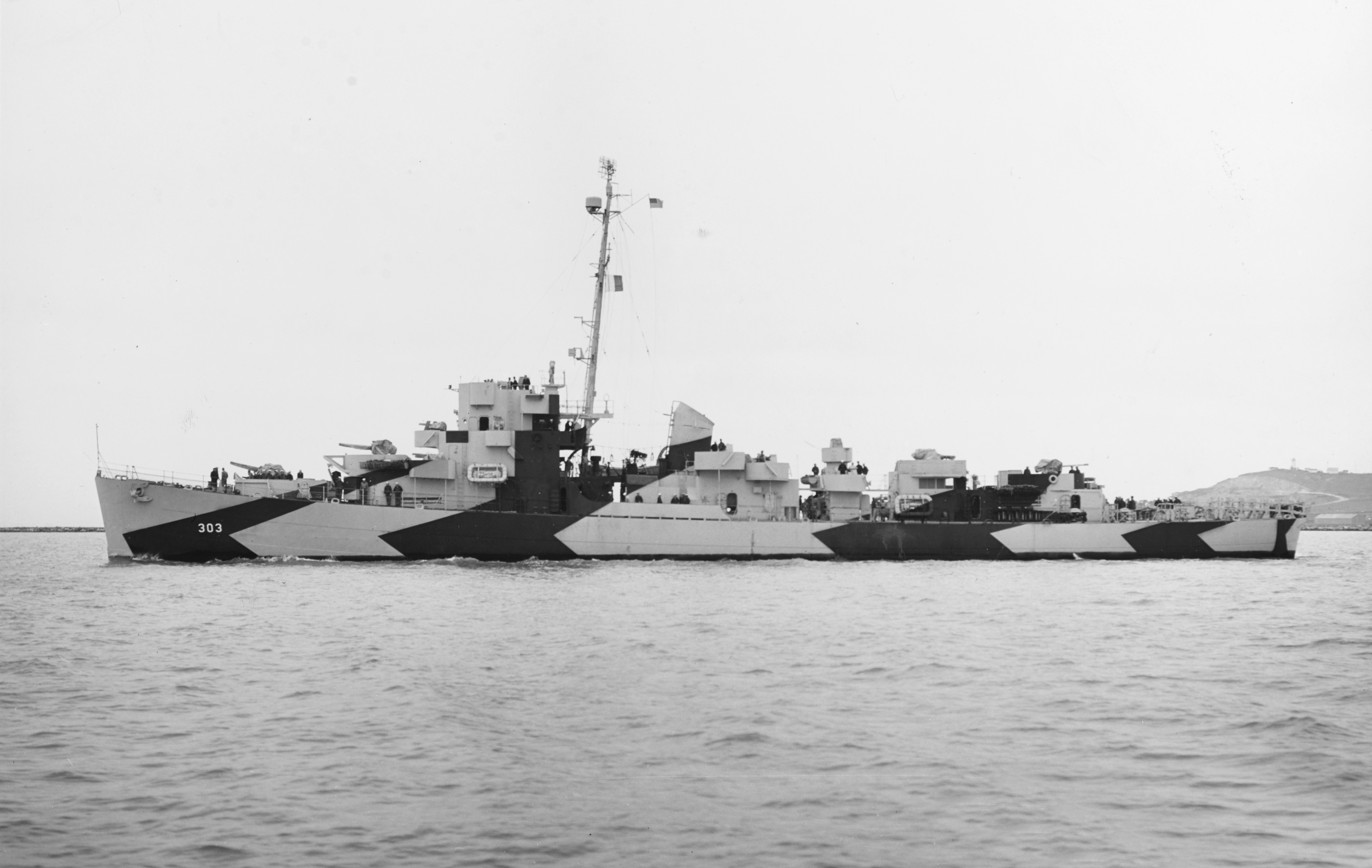
- USS Crowley off Mare Island Naval Shipyard on 2 April 1944

History

United States
- Name: USS Crowley
- Builder: Mare Island Navy Yard
- Laid down: 24 May 1943
- Launched: 22 September 1943
- Commissioned: 25 March 1944
- Decommissioned: 3 December 1945
- Stricken: 19 December 1945
- Honors and awards: 5 battle stars (World War II)
- Fate: Sold for scrapping, 21 December 1946

General characteristics
- Type: Evarts-class destroyer escort
- Displacement: 1,140 long tons (1,158 t) standard; 1,430 long tons (1,453 t) full
- Length: 289 ft 5 in (88.21 m) o/a; 283 ft 6 in (86.41 m) w/l
- Beam: 35 ft 2 in (10.72 m)
- Draft: 11 ft (3.4 m) (max)
- Propulsion: 4 × General Motors Model 16-278A diesel engines with electric drive, 6,000 shp (4,474 kW); 2 screws
- Speed: 19 knots (35 km/h; 22 mph)
- Range: 4,150 nmi (7,690 km)
- Complement: 15 officers and 183 enlisted
- Armament: 3 × single 3"/50 Mk.22 dual purpose guns; 1 × quad 1.1"/75 Mk.2 AA gun; 9 × 20 mm Mk.4 AA guns; 1 × Hedgehog Projector Mk.10 (144 rounds); 8 × Mk.6 depth charge projectors; 2 × Mk.9 depth charge tracks

USS Crowley (DE-303) was an Evarts-class destroyer escort of the United States Navy during World War II. She was sent off into the Pacific Ocean to protect convoys and other ships from Japanese submarines and fighter aircraft. She performed escort and antisubmarine operations in dangerous battle areas and returned home with five battle stars.

== Design ==
The Evarts-class destroyer escorts were 289 ft 5 in (88.21 m) long overall, and they had a beam of 35 ft 2 in (10.72 m). They had an average draft of 10 ft 1 in (3.07 m) at their full load displacement of 1,416 long tons (1,439 t). Each ship had a normal crew numbered 156 officers and sailors.

Crowley was propelled by a pair of diesel motors manufactured by General Motors, which drove a pair of screw propellers. Her propulsion system was rated to produce 6,000 brake horsepower (4,500 kW) for a top speed of 19.5 knots (36.1 km/h; 22.4 mph). Oil storage amounted to between 131 and 197 long tons (133 and 200 t), which allowed a cruising radius of up to 6,000 nautical miles (11,000 km; 6,900 mi) at an economical pace of 10 knots (19 km/h; 12 mph).

The ship's armament consisted of a main battery of three 3-inch (76 mm) /50-caliber guns in individual pivot mounts, which could be used against air or surface targets. These were supported by a light anti-aircraft battery that initially consisted of four 1.1 in (28 mm) /75-caliber guns in a quadruple mount and nine 20 mm (0.79 in) Oerlikon guns. For attacks against submarines, the ship was equipped with a Hedgehog mortar, eight depth charge throwers, and two depth charge racks.

== Service history ==
Crowley was launched on 22 September 1943 by Mare Island Navy Yard. The ship was named after Thomas Crowley, an officer killed aboard USS Arizona in the attack on Pearl Harbor; his widow christened the ship at the launching ceremony. The ship was commissioned on 25 March 1944 and reported to the Pacific Fleet.

Departing San Francisco, California, on 25 May 1944, Crowley arrived at Pearl Harbor on 31 May and joined in anti-submarine training exercises in Hawaii until 12 August. Escorting a convoy, she arrived at Guadalcanal on 25 August, and with another convoy reached Manus on 14 September. Between 15 September and 18 November 1944, Crowley sailed out of Manus escorting shipping to the Palau Islands during the invasion and consolidation, with occasional voyages to Humboldt Bay, New Guinea, and the Solomons. On 26 September she joined Donaldson (DE-44) in giving assistance to the merchant ship SS Don Marquis rescuing her survivors and bringing her fires under control to save her war cargo.

Crowley based at Ulithi from 21 November 1944, joining a logistics group supporting the fast carrier task forces. Until 1 February 1945 she escorted oilers to the ocean rendezvous at which they replenished the carrier forces striking Luzon, Formosa, and the China coast, then operated with the oilers in the assault on Iwo Jima until 22 March. Departing Ulithi on 22 March, Crowley arrived at Guam on 9 April and continued escorting oilers during the Okinawa operations until 18 June. From 3 July to the end of hostilities Crowley supported the 3rd and the 5th Fleet raids on the Japanese home islands. On similar logistics duty for the occupation forces, Crowley arrived at Sagami Wan, Honshū, on 9 September. Crowley departed Tokyo Bay on 16 September 1945 and arrived at San Francisco on 8 October. Crowley was decommissioned on 3 December 1945 and sold on 21 December 1946.
