= The Good Old Soak =

1937 film by J. Walter Ruben

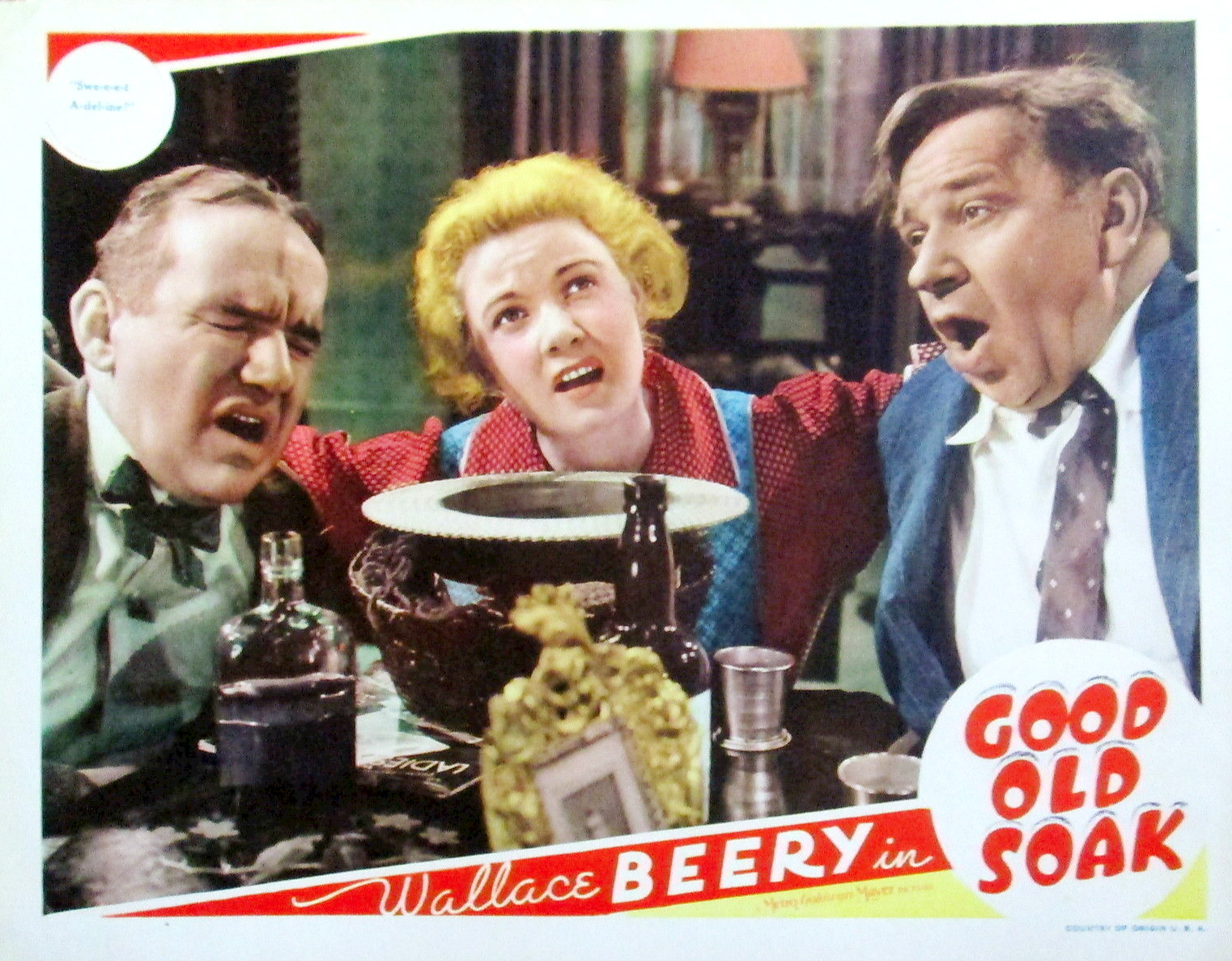
- Lobby card with Ted Healy and Wallace Beery
- Directed by: J. Walter Ruben
- Written by: A.E. Thomas
- Based on: The Old Soak by Don Marquis
- Produced by: Harry Rapf
- Starring: Wallace Beery; Una Merkel; Eric Linden; Judith Barrett; Betty Furness; Ted Healy
- Cinematography: Clyde De Vinna
- Edited by: Frank Sullivan
- Music by: Edward Ward
- Production company: Metro-Goldwyn-Mayer
- Release date: April 23, 1937 (Location)
- Running time: 67 minutes
- Country: United States
- Language: English

The Good Old Soak is a 1937 American drama film starring Wallace Beery. It was directed by J. Walter Ruben from a screenplay by A. E. Thomas, based upon the 1922 stage play The Old Soak by Don Marquis.

The picture's supporting cast features Una Merkel, Eric Linden, Betty Furness, and Ted Healy.

== Plot ==
Wallace Beery as Clem Hawley (Old Soak)

Margaret Hamilton

Clem Hawley is a married man living in Nassau County on Long Island in New York. Some people call him "The Old Soak" because he has an alcohol abuse problem. His wife is named Matilda and his grown-up son is Clemmie, who has a good job in Manhattan.

Matilda has been trying to keep her family out of bankruptcy. She asks her cousin, banker Webster Parsons, for advice on selling some stock certificates she owns. He knows that the stocks are worth $11,000, but tells her they are worthless and should just keep them. Matilda takes his advice and stores the stock certificates in her safe.

Clemmie is enamored with Ina Heath, a show girl in Manhattan. He has boasted to her that his family on Long Island is wealthy and has been showering her with expensive gifts. To maintain the illusion, he has been making risky trades on the stock market and owes a lot of money due to losses. Desperate for cash, Clemmie asks Webster for a loan. Webster agrees, but only if Clemmie "borrows" his mother's stock to serve as collateral on the loan. Clemmie then steals the stock certificates from his mother's safe and gives them to Webster as collateral.

Some time later, Matilda's daughter Lucy announces her engagement to the wealthy Tom Ogden. Matilda happily goes to her safe to obtain a family heirloom to give to Lucy. To her horror, she discovers that the stock certificates are gone. Matilda is certain that Clem cashed them to buy more liquor. She doesn't share her suspicions with anyone, but soon begins to treat Clem very coldly. Clem has no idea what is going on with her. He meets a kindly peddlar named Kennedy, who lets him buy a gift for Matilda on credito. However, it does not please her. Matilda finally accuses Clem of stealing her stock certificates. Despite his denials, she does not believe him.

While Clemmie is at work, Clem happens to look into Clemmie's room. When he sees a picture of the glamorous Ina, he begins to suspect that his son took the certificates. He then hitches a ride into New York on Kennedy's wagon and goes to Ina's club. When Ina meets Clem, she thinks he is pretending to be a poor "hick" to discourage her from dating Clemmie. After Ina finally realizes the truth, she is furious. When Clemmie arrives, she says that she never wants to see him again. Ina said he should be giving money to his family instead of spending it on a fur coat for her. Clemmie then confesses about his stock market losses and said that he might go to jail if he cannot cover his debt. Ina throws the fur coat at him and tells him to go away.

When Clem finally confronts Clemmie about the stock certificates, he reveals everything. Clem knows that it would break Matilda's heart if she learned her son was a thief. At this moment, Clem finally realizes that he has been a neglectful father and husband. He even convinces Lucy that he stole the certificates. Clem also learns the true value of the stock certificates. Clem tells Matilda that he will move out of the house. However, as Matilda is helping him pack, she sees their honeymoon picture in his suitcase. It reminds her of how much she still loves him. She begs Clem to stay, but he refuses and remains silent about Clemmie.

Just as Clem is about to leave home, Webster calls the house. Clem arranges to meet him at his office that evening. Meanwhile, Al Simmons, a bootlegger friend of Clem's, reveals that to Clem that Webster is really his secret partner. Clem arrives at Webster's office just as Al is leaving. Webster tries to pretend that Al is merely looking for a job. Clem confronts Webster about the bootlegging and his swindling Matilda.

An enraged Clem threatens to kill Webster and make it look like a suicide. A fearful Webster gives Clem the entire $11,000 in cash. Clem then finds Kennedy and asks him to take the money to Matilda. Kennedy arrives at the Hawley house with the money, just after Clemmie has finally confessed everything to Matilda and Lucy. When Kennedy tells them that Clem is taking the 10:57 train to New York, they rush to the train station in Kennedy's wagon and arrive in time to stop Clem from leaving town.

== Cast ==
- Wallace Beery as Clem Hawley
- Una Merkel as Nellie
- Eric Linden as Clemmie Hawley
- Judith Barrett as Ina Heath
- Betty Furness as Lucy Hawley
- Ted Healy as Al Simmons
- Janet Beecher as Matilda Hawley
- George Sidney as Kennedy
- Robert McWade as Webster Parsons
- James Bush as Tom Ogden
- Margaret Hamilton as Minnie

== Production ==
Screenwriter Thomas was disturbed that MGM changed the film title from the original The Old Soak to the Good Old Soak. MGM did that because it felt Wallace Beery's fans considered the word "good" synonymous with Beery. Rollin Kirby, a distinguished political cartoonist on the New York World newspaper, and good friend of Don Marquis, got a laugh from Marquis when he suggested how appropriate it was that a man named Beery would portray the Old Soak himself. The story was previously made as a silent film by Universal in 1926 called The Old Soak, starring Jean Hersholt.
