= USS Donaldson =

United States Navy ship

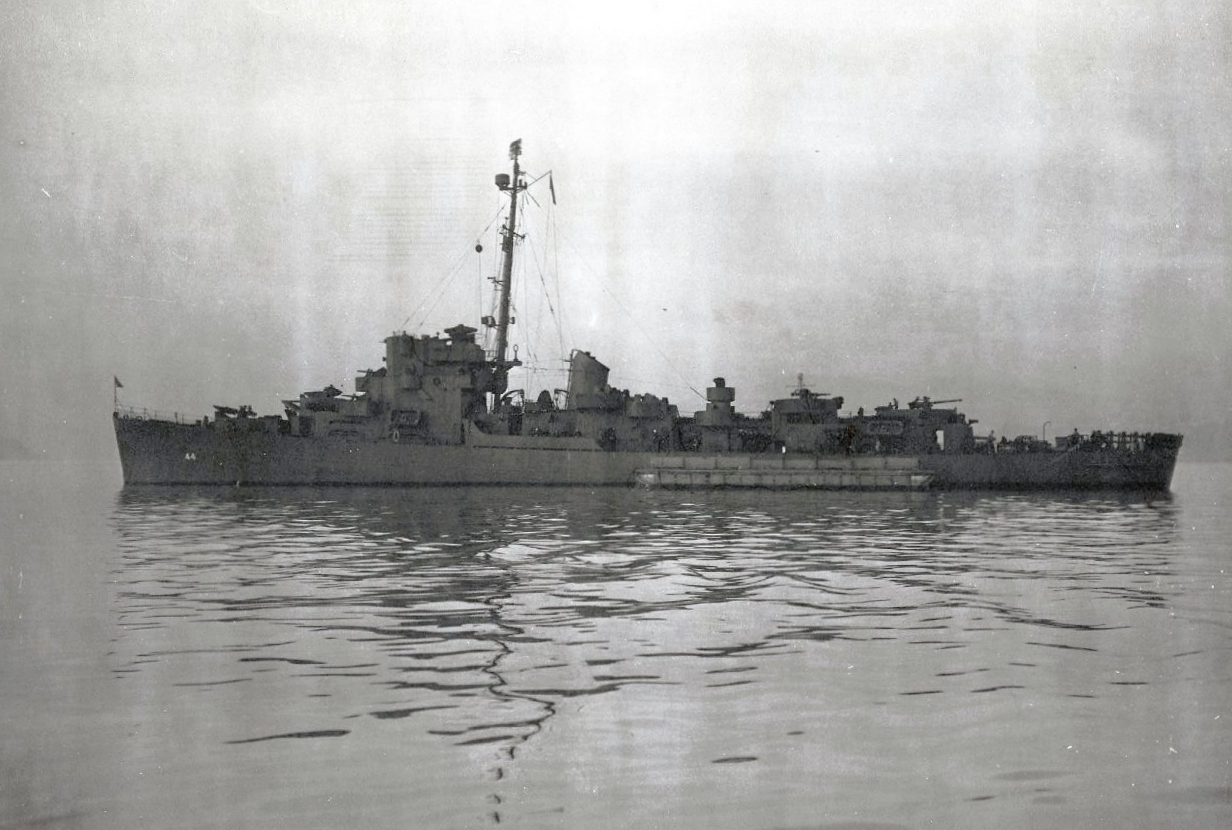
- Donaldson underway on 15 December 1943

History

United States
- Name: USS Donaldson
- Namesake: Lt. (jg) Trose Emmett Donaldson
- Builder: Puget Sound Navy Yard
- Laid down: 12 January 1943
- Launched: 1 August 1943
- Commissioned: 1 December 1943
- Decommissioned: 5 December 1945
- Stricken: 19 December 1945
- Honors and awards: 7 battle stars (World War II)
- Fate: Sold for scrapping, 2 July 1946

General characteristics
- Type: Evarts-class destroyer escort
- Displacement: 1,140 long tons (1,158 t) standard; 1,430 long tons (1,453 t) full
- Length: 289 ft 5 in (88.21 m) o/a; 283 ft 6 in (86.41 m) w/l
- Beam: 35 ft 2 in (10.72 m)
- Draft: 11 ft (3.4 m) (max)
- Propulsion: 4 × General Motors Model 16-278A diesel engines with electric drive, 6,000 shp (4,474 kW); 2 screws
- Speed: 19 knots (35 km/h; 22 mph)
- Range: 4,150 nmi (7,690 km)
- Complement: 15 officers and 183 enlisted
- Armament: 3 × single 3"/50 Mk.22 dual purpose guns; 1 × quad 1.1"/75 Mk.2 AA gun; 9 × 20 mm Mk.4 AA guns; 1 × Hedgehog Projector Mk.10 (144 rounds); 8 × Mk.6 depth charge projectors; 2 × Mk.9 depth charge tracks

USS Donaldson (DE-44) was an Evarts-class destroyer escort of the United States Navy during World War II. She was sent off into the Pacific Ocean to protect convoys and other ships from Japanese submarines and fighter aircraft. She performed escort and anti-submarine operations in dangerous battle areas and was awarded seven battle stars, a very high number for a ship of her type.

== Design ==
The Evarts-class destroyer escorts were 289 ft 5 in (88.21 m) long overall, and they had a beam of 35 ft 2 in (10.72 m). They had an average draft of 10 ft 1 in (3.07 m) at their full load displacement of 1,416 long tons (1,439 t). Each ship had a normal crew numbered 156 officers and sailors.

Donaldson was propelled by a pair of diesel motors manufactured by General Motors, which drove a pair of screw propellers. Her propulsion system was rated to produce 6,000 brake horsepower (4,500 kW) for a top speed of 19.5 knots (36.1 km/h; 22.4 mph). Oil storage amounted to between 131 and 197 long tons (133 and 200 t), which allowed a cruising radius of up to 6,000 nautical miles (11,000 km; 6,900 mi) at an economical pace of 10 knots (19 km/h; 12 mph).

The ship's armament consisted of a main battery of three 3-inch (76 mm) /50-caliber guns in individual pivot mounts, which could be used against air or surface targets. These were supported by a light anti-aircraft battery that initially consisted of four 1.1 in (28 mm) /75-caliber guns in a quadruple mount and nine 20 mm (0.79 in) Oerlikon guns. For attacks against submarines, the ship was equipped with a Hedgehog mortar, eight depth charge throwers, and two depth charge racks.

== Service history ==
She was originally intended for transfer to the United Kingdom as BDE-44, but was retained by the US Navy and was renamed Donaldson after Trose Donaldson, who had been killed during the Philippines campaign. The ship was launched on 1 August 1943 by Puget Sound Navy Yard; sponsored by Mrs. J. J. Donaldson, mother of the ship's namesake. Donaldson was commissioned on 1 December 1943.

Donaldson arrived at Pearl Harbor on 9 February 1944 and five days later got underway for the invasion of the Marshall Islands. She screened a convoy to Roi Namur and gave local escort service there and at Eniwetok until returning to Pearl Harbor 25 March. From 23 April to 4 June she trained with submarines, most of the period serving as flagship for Commander, Escort Division 49.

Donaldson departed Pearl Harbor on 12 June 1944 to escort a convoy to Kwajalein, then sailed to Eniwetok where she joined a hunter-killer group with Hoggatt Bay (CVE-75) and three other escorts for operations between the Marshalls and Marianas from 5 July to 9 August. Donaldson returned to Pearl Harbor on 15 August and five days later got underway to escort the Western Garrison Force for the assault and occupation of the Palaus, patrolling off Peleliu and Angaur from 20 to 22 September. She escorted unladen transports to Hollandia, New Guinea, then arrived at Manus on 26 September. That evening she and Crowley (DE-303) assisted in bringing the fires on the merchantman SS Don Marquis under control. Returning to Palau on 2 October, Donaldson made anti-submarine patrols and two escort voyages to the Russell Islands until 21 November.

Arriving at Ulithi on 21 November 1944 Donaldson reported to the 3rd Fleet for duty as escort for the logistics group supporting the fast carrier task force. By able ship handling she survived Typhoon Cobra on 18 December, but lost three men overboard and suffered damage which was repaired at Ulithi from 24 December 1944 to 12 January 1945. She returned to duty with the 3rd Fleet fueling group operating in support of the assaults on Iwo Jima and Okinawa and the final strikes on the Japanese homeland and on 31 August she was detached to join a logistics unit in the Yellow Sea for the occupation of Jinsen, Korea. Donaldson sailed from Okinawa on 16 September 1945 for Saipan, Pearl Harbor and San Francisco arriving on 8 October. Donaldson was decommissioned on 5 December 1945, and sold on 2 July 1946.

== Awards ==
- American Campaign Medal
- Asiatic-Pacific Campaign Medal (with seven service stars)
- World War II Victory Medal
