= Josephine Victor =

Hungarian-born American stage actress, director and playwright

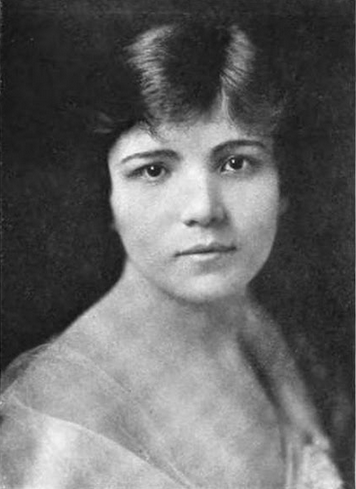
Josephine Victor, from a 1916 publication.

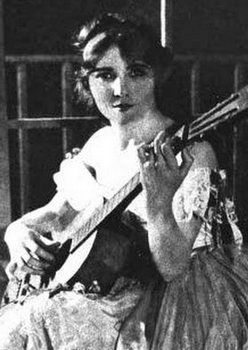
Josephine Victor, in a 1920 publication

Josephine Victor (born Josephine Gunczler; June 28, 1885 – 1963) was a Hungarian-born American stage actress, director, and playwright.

== Early life ==
Victor was born in the Tokay Hills in Hungary in 1885, and moved to New York City as a child. She may have attended the Wheatcroft School of Acting on a scholarship. She used her brother Victor's first name for a surname when she began acting. She began performing with the Howard Kyle Company, and made headlines as early as 1906, when her costume caught fire on stage, and she doused the flames without breaking character.

== Career ==
On Broadway she debuted in The Secret Orchard by Channing Pollock (1908), and appeared in The Temperamental Journey (1913), The Yellow Ticket (1914), The Bargain by Hermann Georg Scheffauer (1915), Just a Woman by Eugene Walter (1916), Martinique by Laurence Eyre (1920), Dolly Jordan by Ben Iden Payne (1922), The Cup (1923), Judgment Day by Elmer Rice (1934), Wise Tomorrow (1937), and finally Summer Night (1939). She is credited as director of one play, Doctor X (1931), a "mystery thriller". She toured the United States with a vaudeville show in 1921. She also appeared on the London stage, in Pelican by F. Tennyson Jesse (1924), and in a few films.

Victor was also a playwright. In 1910 she co-wrote a play, Ashes, with Eleanor Maud Crane. Later, as Josephine Victor Reid, she wrote The Prize Pig's Tea-party (1934), a play, How to Get Rich (1930). She also co-wrote two plays, Clay Pigeon (1936, with Marjorie Paradis) and Read about Laura Keene (1937, with I. S. Strouse). She collaborated with Laurence Eyre on creating the 1920 play Martinique, but was not credited as its co-author.

== Personal life ==
Josephine Victor married Francis E. Reid, a publicist and drama critic. She was widowed in 1933. She died in 1963, aged 78 years.

== Filmography ==
| Year | Title | Role | Notes |
|---|---|---|---|
| 1946 | The Stranger | Minor Role | Uncredited |
| 1947 | Desire Me | Woman | Uncredited, (final film role) |
