= Minnie Dupree =

American actress (1875–1947)

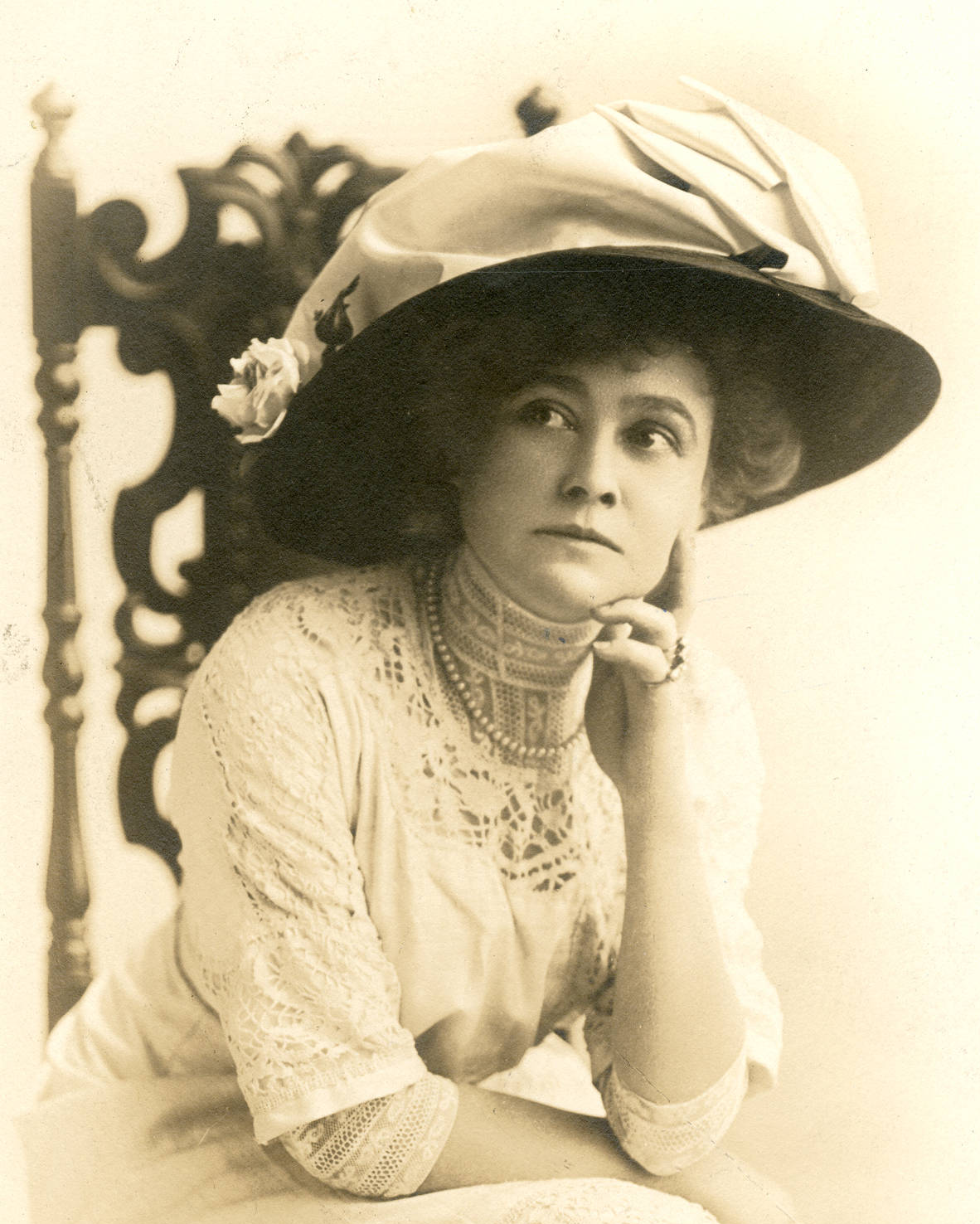
- Born: January 19, 1875; San Francisco, California, U.S.
- Died: May 23, 1947 (aged 72); New York City, U.S.
- Occupation: Actress
- Years active: 1887—1947

Minnie Dupree (January 19, 1875 – May 23, 1947) was an American stage, film, and radio actress. During the Great Depression, she helped organize the Stage Relief Fund to assist unemployed actors and actresses.

== Biography ==
Born in San Francisco, California, Dupree made her acting debut in a touring company under John A. Stevens in 1887. The next year, she made a big impression in a small role in William Gillette's New York play Held by the Enemy. She received a number of important supporting roles, working with Richard Mansfield, Stuart Robson, and Nat Goodwin. She landed a starring role in 1900 in Women and Wine. Other leading roles followed, including in The Climbers (1901), A Rose o' Plymouth-town (1902), Heidelberg (1902), The Music Master (1904), and The Road to Yesterday (1906).

Her later stage career was not successful, and exceptions were The Old Soak (1922), The Shame Woman (1923), Outward Bound (1924), playing Mrs. Midge, and as a replacement for the part of Martha Brewster in the hit Arsenic and Old Lace in 1941. This was followed by the role of Emma Jolonik in Lily of the Valley (1942). Her last stage appearance was in Land's End (1946). She acted in two feature-length films: The Young in Heart (1938), with Janet Gaynor, Douglas Fairbanks, Jr., Paulette Goddard, Roland Young, and Billie Burke, and Anne of Windy Poplars (1940).

== Personal life ==
On November 8, 1896, it was announced that she would marry Major William H. Langley, a reputed millionaire, at the end of the season. At the time, she was described as a "handsome blonde, and the possessor of a magnificent head of curly hair."

Dupree died in New York City on May 23, 1947, at age 72.
