= Lily of the Valley (play) =

Lily of the Valley is a drama in three acts by Ben Hecht. The play is set inside New York City's county morgue and centers around a visiting preacher who hears the ghosts of the dead. Other central characters include a police lieutenant and a photographer for the morgue. It premiered on Broadway at the Windsor Theatre on January 26, 1942. It had a short run of just eight performances. It was produced by Gilbert Miller and directed by Hecht. Harry Horner designed both the lights and sets. Helene Pons designed the costumes. The cast was led by Siegfried Rumann as the Rev. Swen Houseman, Clay Clement as Lieutenant Balboa, Myron McCormick as the longshoreman Shorty, Minnie Dupree as Emma Jolonick, Katharine Bard as Frances, Will Lee as Joe, Grania O'Malley as Annie, Alison Skipworth as Mag, and Richard Taber as Blakie Gagin among others.
