= The Quarterback (1926 film) =

1926 film

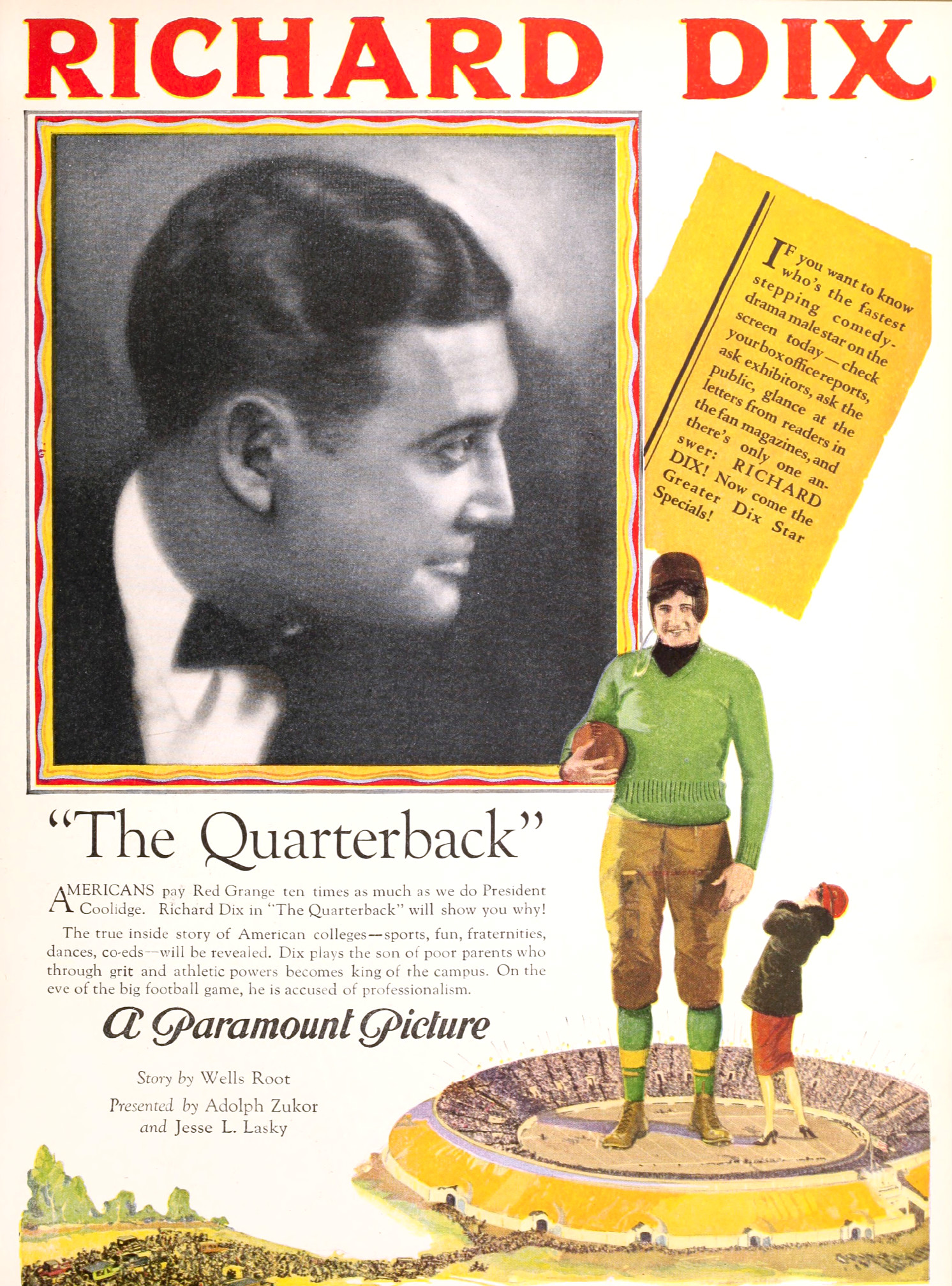
- Advertisement
- Directed by: Fred C. Newmeyer
- Screenplay by: William Slavens McNutt; W. O. McGeehan; Ray Harris
- Produced by: Jesse L. Lasky; Adolph Zukor; Ralph Block
- Starring: Richard Dix; Esther Ralston; Harry Beresford; David Butler
- Cinematography: Edward Cronjager
- Production company: Famous Players–Lasky Corporation
- Distributed by: Paramount Pictures
- Release date: October 11, 1926
- Running time: 80 minutes
- Country: United States
- Language: Silent (English intertitles)

The Quarterback is a 1926 American silent comedy film directed by Fred C. Newmeyer and written by William Slavens McNutt, W. O. McGeehan, and Ray Harris. The film stars Richard Dix, Esther Ralston, Harry Beresford, David Butler, Robert W. Craig, and Mona Palma. The film was released on October 11, 1926, by Paramount Pictures.

== Plot ==
Elmer Stone, quarterback of the 1899 Colton College football team vows to remain a student until Colton beats its biggest rival, State University. Twenty-seven years later, Elmer is still in school and is a classmate of his son, Jack. Other than driving a milk wagon in his spare time, Jack is also the quarterback of the football team. A matter of his eligibility comes up but he is cleared and goes out to do-or-die for Colton against State University. Maybe they will win The Big Game, and Jack's father can get a life...and a job.

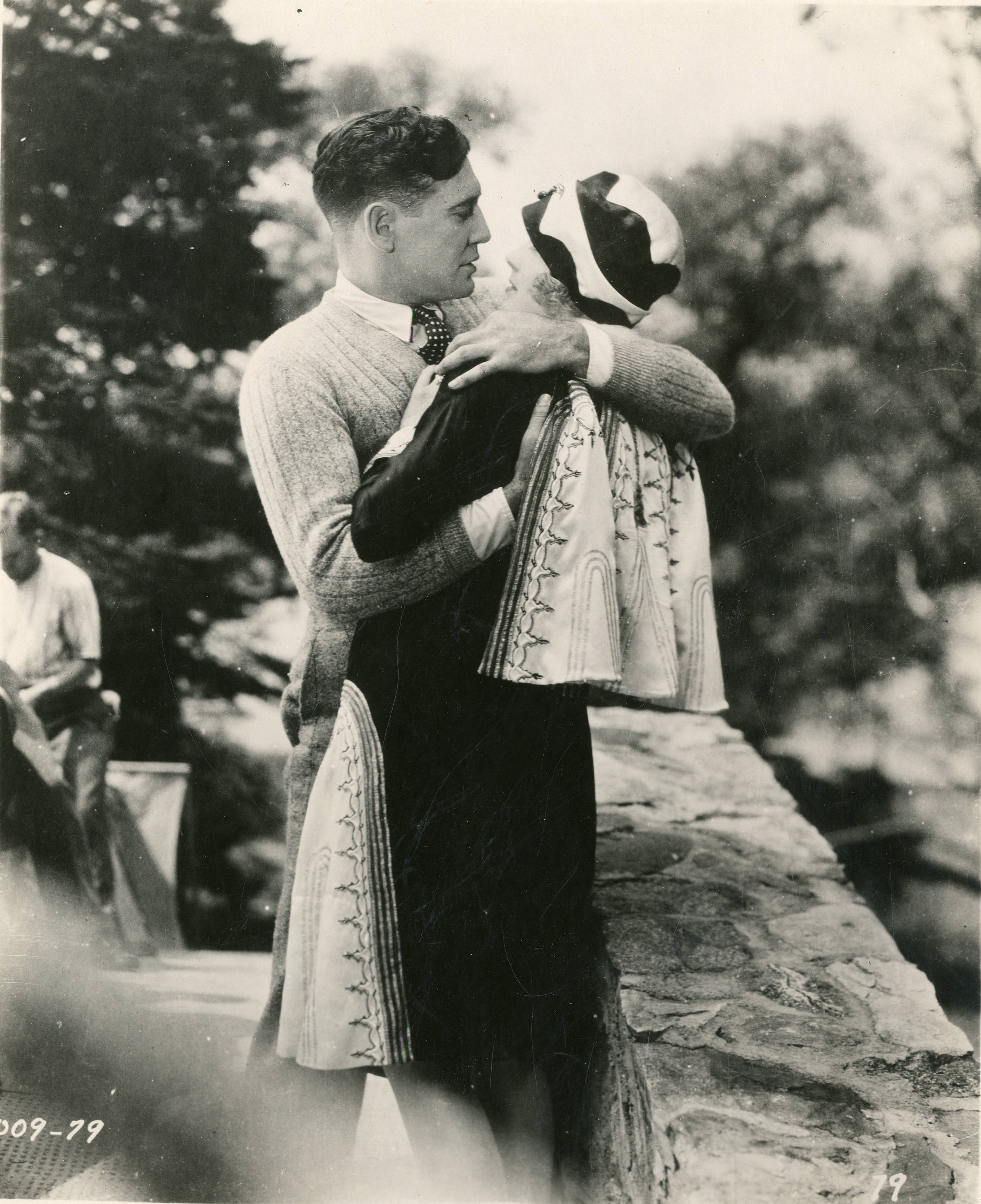
Still with Richard Dix and Esther Ralston

== Cast ==
- Richard Dix as Jack Stone
- Esther Ralston as Louise Mason
- Harry Beresford as Elmer Stone
- David Butler as "Lumpy" Goggins
- Robert W. Craig as Denny Walters
- Mona Palma as Nellie Webster

== Preservation status ==
A print of the film is preserved in the Library of Congress collection.

== See also ==
- List of American football films
