= Doctor X (play) =

Doctor X is a play in three acts by Howard Warren Comstock and Allen C. Miller. It was written in 1928 under the title of Terror but retitled Doctor X when it finally reached the stage in 1931. It premiered on Broadway at the Hudson Theatre on February 9, 1931. It ran there for 80 performances; closing on April 18, 1931. It was directed by Josephine Victor and produced by William Brandt and Harry Brandt. The cast was led by Howard Lang in the title role. Some of the other cast members included J. W. Austin as Leyden Duke, Eden Gray as Mavis, Boris Marshalov as Prof. Haines, May Vokes as Jessie, Barry Macollum as Ben, George Blackwood as Neil Merlin, and Florence Shirley as Eleanor Stevens. The play was the basis for the 1932 film Doctor X.
