= She Asked for It =

1937 film by Erle C. Kenton

- Theatrical release poster
- Directed by: Erle C. Kenton
- Screenplay by: Frederick J. Jackson; Theodore Reeves
- Produced by: B. P. Schulberg
- Starring: William Gargan; Orien Heyward; Vivienne Osborne; Richard Carle; Roland Drew; Harry Beresford; Alan Birmingham
- Cinematography: Leon Shamroy
- Edited by: Robert Bischoff
- Production company: Paramount Pictures
- Distributed by: Paramount Pictures
- Release date: September 17, 1937
- Running time: 69 minutes
- Country: United States
- Language: English

She Asked for It is a 1937 American comedy film directed by Erle C. Kenton and written by Frederick J. Jackson and Theodore Reeves. The film stars William Gargan, Orien Heyward, Vivienne Osborne, Richard Carle, Roland Drew, Harry Beresford, and Alan Birmingham. It was released on September 17, 1937, by Paramount Pictures.

== Cast ==
- William Gargan as Dwight Stanford
- Orien Heyward as Penelope Stanford
- Vivienne Osborne as Ceila Stettin
- Richard Carle as Ted Hoyt
- Roland Drew as Randolph Stettin
- Harry Beresford as Mr. Switch
- Alan Birmingham as Conrad Norris
- Harry Fleischmann as Jenkins
- Tully Marshall as Old Man Stettin
- Miki Morita as Kaito
