= Doctor X (film) =

1932 film

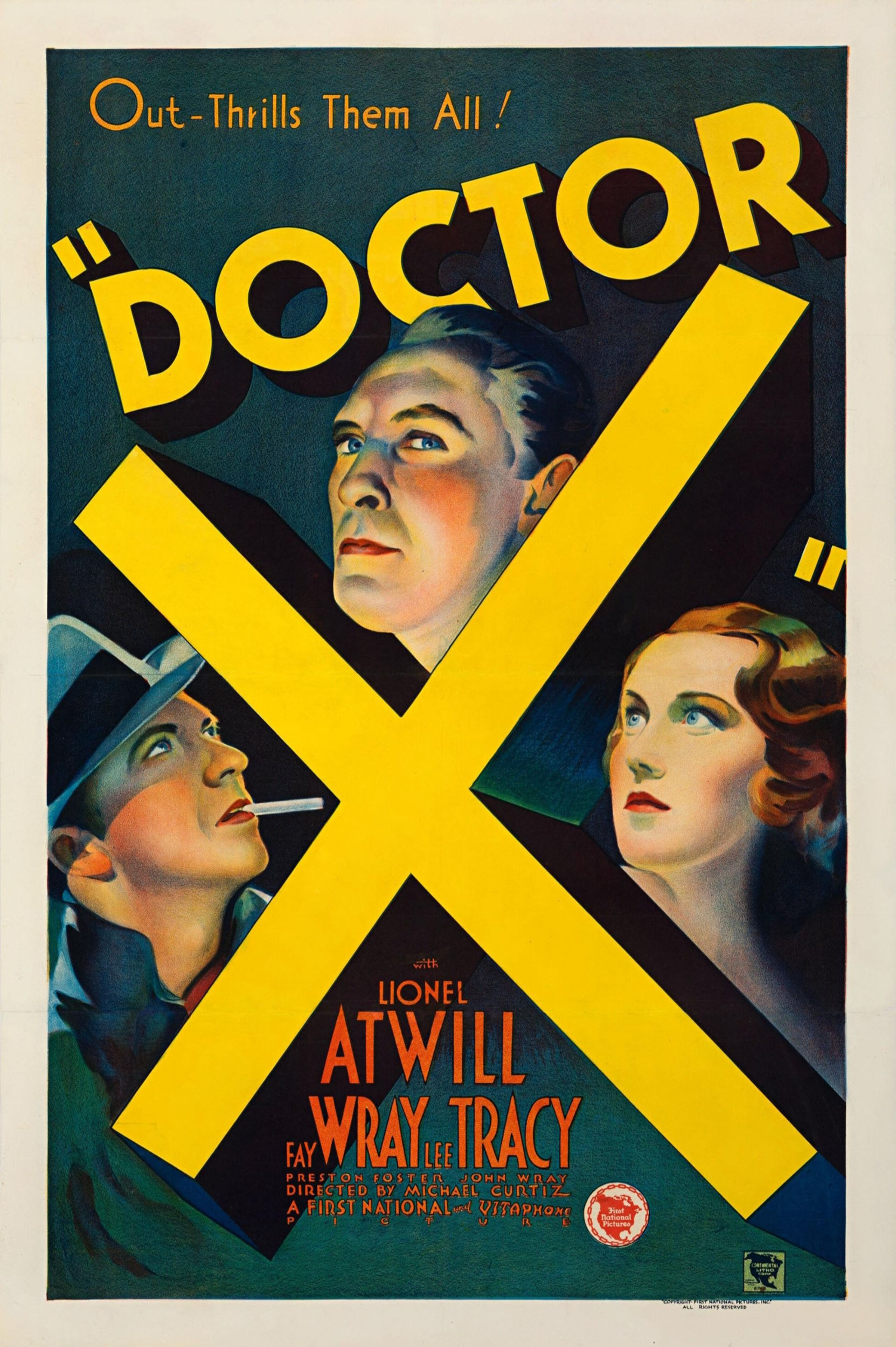
- Theatrical release poster
- Directed by: Michael Curtiz
- Written by: Robert Tasker; Earl Baldwin
- Based on: Doctor X by Howard W. Comstock; Allen C. Miller
- Produced by: Hal B. Wallis (uncredited); Darryl F. Zanuck (uncredited)
- Starring: Lionel Atwill; Fay Wray; Lee Tracy; Preston Foster
- Cinematography: Ray Rennahan (Technicolor version); Richard Tower (black-and-white version)
- Edited by: George Amy
- Music by: Leo F. Forbstein; Bernhard Kaun
- Color process: Technicolor
- Production company: First National Pictures
- Distributed by: Warner Bros. Pictures
- Release date: August 3, 1932 (New York City)
- Running time: 76 minutes
- Country: United States
- Language: English
- Budget: $224,000
- Box office: $594,000

Doctor X is a 1932 American pre-Code mystery horror film produced jointly by First National and Warner Bros. Pictures. Based on the 1931 play Doctor X (originally titled Terror) by Howard W. Comstock and Allen C. Miller, it was directed by Michael Curtiz and stars Lionel Atwill, Fay Wray and Lee Tracy.

Doctor X was produced before the Motion Picture Production Code was enforced. Themes such as murder, rape, cannibalism and prostitution are interwoven into the story. The film was one of the last produced, along with Warner Bros.' subsequent Mystery of the Wax Museum (1933), in the early two-color Technicolor process. Separate black-and-white prints were shipped to small towns and foreign markets, while color prints were reserved for major cities.

In the film, there are a series of murders in New York City. Each murder takes place under the full moon, and each body has been cannibalized post-mortem. Dr. Xavier is asked to provide his medical insight into the crimes, though the police actually suspect him and other people in Xavier's medical academy. The Moon Killer is conducting his own experiments, in an attempt to collect samples from his victims.

== Plot ==
Daily World newshawk Lee Taylor is investigating a series of pathological murders that have taken place over a series of months in New York City. The murders always take place at night, under the glow of a full moon, and each body has been cannibalized after the murder. Witnesses describe a horribly disfigured "monster" as the killer.

Doctor Xavier is called in for his medical opinion, but the police have an ulterior motive. They want to investigate Xavier's medical academy, as the brain scalpel used to cannibalize the bodies of the victims is exclusive to that institution. Aside from Xavier, the other suspects are: Wells, an amputee who has made a study of cannibalism; Haines, who displays a sexual perversion with voyeurism; Duke, a grouchy paralytic; and Rowitz, who is conducting studies of the psychological effects of the moon.

The police give Xavier 48 hours to apprehend the killer in his own way. During this time, reporter Taylor investigates the doctor's intentions and in the process, meets Joanne Xavier, the doctor's daughter. Joanne is exceedingly cold to Taylor, particularly after finding out that it was his story that pointed a finger at her father and ruined his first attempt at locating the killer. Taylor takes a romantic interest in Joanne, despite her hostility.

At Dr. Xavier's beach-side estate, all of the suspects gather for an unorthodox experiment. Each member is being investigated except Wells, because the killer has two hands and Wells has but one. Each man is connected to an electrical system that records his heart rate. When a re-enactment of the murder of the cleaning woman appears before them, the detector will expose the guilty man. Dr. Xavier's butler and maid, Otto and Mamie, carry out the reenactment.

During the experiment, a blackout occurs. When power is regained, it is discovered that Rowitz, whose monitor supposedly revealed him as the guilty party just before the blackout, has been murdered by use of a scalpel to the brain. Later that night, it is discovered that Rowitz's body has been cannibalized.

The following evening, Xavier asks Otto and Mamie to re-enact another of the murders. Mamie is too frightened to play her part, so Joanne takes her place. All of the men, save for Wells, are this time handcuffed to their seats, and the doors locked to keep Wells at the recording cabinet.

During the experiment, Wells sneaks into a secret laboratory where he transforms himself with "synthetic flesh" into the monstrous Moon Killer. After strangling Otto, Wells reveals to his horrified colleagues that he has been committing the murders to collect living samples of human flesh for his experiments. He declares his intention to collect Joanne as his victim.

As Wells is about to strangle Joanne, Taylor – concealed among a series of wax figures representing the killer's victims – jumps Wells. After an extended fight, Taylor hurls a kerosene lamp at Wells, setting him on fire. Wells crashes through a window and falls down a cliff in flames to the ocean shore below. Reporting his story into the paper, Taylor tells his editor to make space in the marriage section for Joanne and himself.

== Cast ==
- Lionel Atwill as Dr. Jerry Xavier, a "Mad Scientist"
- Fay Wray as Joanne Xavier, Dr. Xavier's Daughter
- Lee Tracy as Lee Taylor, Daily World reporter
- Preston Foster as Dr. Wells, Academy of Surgical Research
- John Wray as Dr. Haines, Academy of Surgical Research
- Harry Beresford as Dr. Duke, Academy of Surgical Research
- Arthur Edmund Carewe as Dr. Rowitz, Academy of Surgical Research
- Leila Bennett as Mamie, Dr. Xavier's maid
- Robert Warwick as Police Commissioner Stevens
- George Rosener as Otto, Dr. X's butler
- Willard Robertson as Detective O'Halloran
- Thomas Jackson as Daily World editor
- Harry Holman as Mike, waterfront policeman
- Mae Busch as Madam
- Tom Dugan as Sheriff
- Selmer Jackson as Willard Keefe, Daily World night editor (uncredited)

== Production ==
The film was the second Warner Bros. feature to be filmed in the improved Technicolor process, which removed grain and improved both the color and clarity of a reel's images. This improved process had initially been used on The Runaround (1931) and resulted in an attempt at a color revival by the studios late in 1931. However, facing public apathy, the studios quickly retreated from their ambitious plans for color films late in 1932.

During production, an alternative black-and-white version was shot and still exists, although side-by-side comparison shows that most takes between the two are the same. Differences in takes are minor, such as Tracy's ad-lib with a skeleton in the closet, and Mae Busch's dialogue as a madam at a brothel. The black-and-white version was offered to exhibitors (much to Technicolor's dismay) as an alternative upon the initial release of the film.

The film was produced in the pre-Code era of Hollywood and contains adult themes throughout, such as those of murder, cannibalism, prostitution, and rape.

Following the success of Doctor X at the box office, Warner Bros. followed up with Mystery of the Wax Museum (1933), which also starred Fay Wray and Lionel Atwill and was directed by Curtiz. Mystery of the Wax Museum was again shot in Technicolor to fulfill Warner Bros.' contract with Technicolor Inc., which ensured that no black-and-white cameras were present on the set. The film became the last two-color Technicolor feature released by a major studio.

Anton Grot designed the sets for both Doctor X and Mystery of the Wax Museum. The makeup was designed by Max Factor, who at that point had been associated with beauty makeup. Mystery of the Wax Museum also shared Factor's horror makeup design.

Doctor X was the first of three Curtiz films with Lionel Atwill, along with Mystery of the Wax Museum and the 1935 Errol Flynn adventure film Captain Blood. Doctor X was also the first of three films that costarred Lionel Atwill and Fay Wray. They would later star together in The Mystery of the Wax Museum and The Vampire Bat.

== Reception ==
Time magazine's reviewer wrote: "Doctor X is a routine nightmare ... and is intended for avid patrons of synthetic horror rather than for normal cinemaddicts." However, Doctor X was well received by many critics and proved to be a success at the box office. Because of the popularity of the film, Warner Bros. followed it with Mystery of the Wax Museum. Despite the title, The Return of Doctor X (1939) is not considered a sequel. However, the 1942 Universal horror movie Night Monster, which also co-stars Atwill as a doctor, has a similar plot and virtually the same denouement.

=== Box office ===
According to Warner Bros., the film earned $405,000 domestically and $189,000 foreign.

== Preservation ==
By the late 1950s, when the black-and-white version of the film was included in a package of older films syndicated to television, the Technicolor version was thought to be lost. No print could be found, and Technicolor had discarded most of its two-color negatives on December 28, 1948.

After the death of Jack L. Warner on September 9, 1978, a print was discovered in his personal collection. It was copied to safety film for preservation, distribution to revival theaters and transfer to video. The original nitrate film print was donated to the UCLA Film & Television Archive, which on very rare occasions has allowed it to be screened publicly at properly equipped and licensed facilities. A far superior digital restoration was conducted by the archive in 2020 and debuted on Blu-ray disc in April 2021.

== In popular culture ==
In the stage musical The Rocky Horror Show and its film adaptation, the opening song, "Science Fiction/Double Feature", references many classic sci-fi/horror films. Among these references is the line "Doctor X will build a creature", despite the fact that Doctor X does not build a creature in the original film.

In homage to the film, the progressive metal band Queensrÿche featured a character named Doctor X (known as Dr. X in the lyrics) as the main antagonist of the band's 1988 concept album Operation: Mindcrime.

A line of dialogue early in the film was sampled on the album Dr. Octagonecologyst by rapper Kool Keith and producer Dan the Automator.

== See also ==
- List of early color feature films
- The Silence of the Lambs
