= The Old Soak (play) =

1922 play by Don Marquis

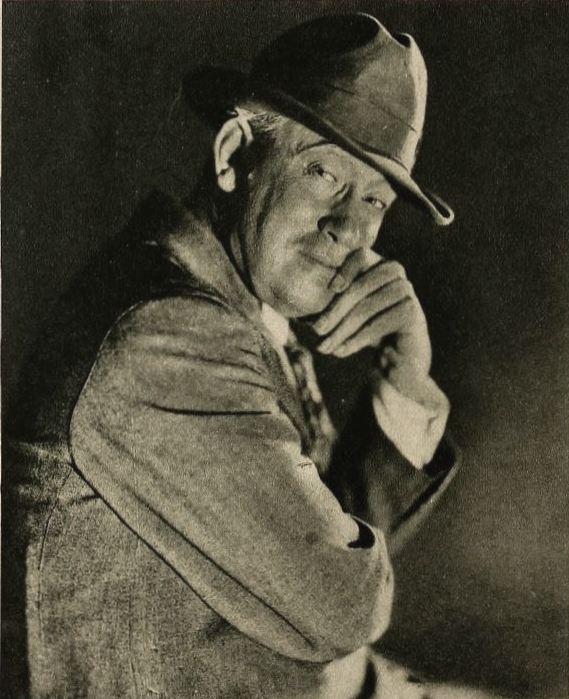
- Harry Beresford in The Old Soak
- Original language: English
- Written by: Don Marquis
- Based on: Newspaper column by Don Marquis
- First publication: 1926
- Genre: Comedy
- Setting: Hawley house on Long Island, and local bank office.

Premiere
- Date: August 22, 1922
- Place: Plymouth Theatre
- Directed by: Arthur Hopkins
- Original run: 337 performances

The Old Soak is a 1922 play by Don Marquis. It is a comedy in three acts and four scenes, with two settings and eleven speaking parts. The action of the play takes place over several days at the small village of Baycliff, on Long Island. The story concerns a retired garage owner who laments the Volstead Act but rallies himself to help his family. Subtitled A Timely Comedy for its concern with Prohibition, the title character was invented by Don Marquis several years earlier for his syndicated newspaper column.

The play was first produced and staged by Arthur Hopkins with settings by Cleon Throckmorton. The Old Soak starred Harry Beresford in the title role, with Minnie Dupree, Robert McWade, George Le Guere, and Robert E. O'Connor in support, and featured Mary Philips. The production had three-day tryouts at Harrisburg and Allentown, Pennsylvania during August 1922 then premiered on Broadway the same month. It ran until early June 1923 for 337 performances. A line from the play, "Al's Here!", announcing the arrival of the local bootlegger, became a popular catchphrase and was even used in advertising. Burns Mantle included The Old Soak among the top ten of The Best Plays of 1922-23.

The Old Soak was adapted for a 1926 silent film of the same name and a 1937 movie titled The Good Old Soak.

== Characters ==
Characters are listed in order of appearance within their scope.

Lead

- Clem Hawley is a retired garage owner, a convivial and constant tippler nicknamed The Old Soak.

Supporting

- Matilda Hawley is Clem's long-suffering wife, who dotes on their spoiled son.
- Webster Parsons is a cousin of Matilda; a deceitful, conniving bank president.
- Clem Hawley, Jr called Clemmie, is Clem and Matilda's son, an office manager for an insurance company.
- Al is a former bartender, now trying his hand at illicit distilling and bootlegging.

Featured

- Lucy Hawley is Clem and Matilda's daughter, a private secretary to a stock broker.
- Tom Ogden is the son of Lucy's boss, a stock broker himself, and romantically interested in her.
- Nellie is the Hawley's hired girl, a former roadhouse chambermaid, an old friend of Al.
- Ina Heath is Clemmie's shimmy dancing big city infatuation, a rough diamond.

Voice Only

- Peter the Parrot unwisely consumes too much of Al's homemade hooch.
- Johnnie Peters is the village constable, himself a drinking man.

== Synopsis ==
The storyline is topical, originating from the recent implementation of the 18th Amendment of the U.S. Constitution, prohibiting the manufacture, sale, and distribution of alcohol within the United States.

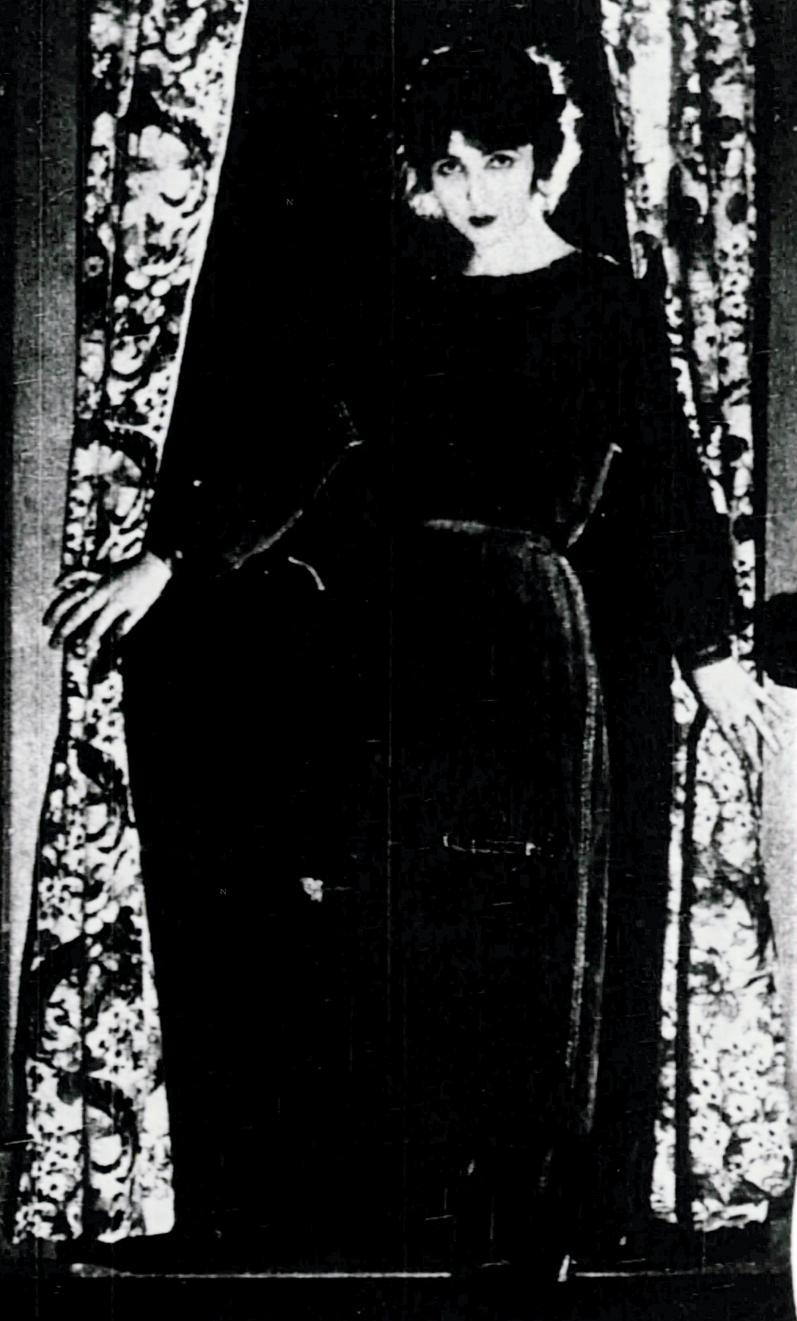
Helene Sinnott as Lucy Hawley

Act I (The Hawley Home on Long Island.) Matilda and Cousin Webster are playing checkers, while Lucy hangs pictures around the room. Matilda is worried about Clem's idleness since retiring. Webster asks about the stock Matilda inherited from her father. Clemmie suggest Matilda let him sell it for her, but Tom Ogden, come to see Lucy, cautions Matilda to hang on to it. Clem arrives home in a fine state, reeling a bit and deflecting talk of work with rosy expectations for the "dee-vice" he has invented. He is vague about its nature, and suggests it will work with autos, submarines, airplanes and all manner of machinery. Clem is alone when Nellie enters to say Al has come to visit. Al has brought homemade spirits, but Clem is skeptical and will not try it or let Nellie do so. Nellie gives some to Peter the Parrot, who shortly is heard squawking out lines of a ribald song from the kitchen. Al and Clem commiserate over the advent of Prohibition, lamenting the loss of the "good ole days". Later, Clemmie removes Matilda's stock certificates from their hiding place. He has her power of attorney, since Clem is not to be relied on when it comes to money. Webster has learned of the deficit in Clemmie's office accounts, and suggested he sell the stock to replace the shortfall. Clemmie, however, wants to invest it in a sure scheme his broker recommended. (Curtain)

Act II (Same as Act I. A few days later, afternoon.) Nellie brings Al in to see Clem. This time Al has brought a flask of fine old alcohol, from his new bootlegging operation. They reflect sadly as Nellie relates the demise of Peter the Parrot, who after begging for more of Al's hooch, croaked "Nellie is a lady" before giving out. Later, Matilda and Lucy are humiliated by Clem's drunken state in front of Tom, who has come for dinner. Matilda confesses her anxiety that Clem has taken her stock. Lucy and Tom quarrel, and he tells Nellie he will not be staying for dinner. Clemmie arrives home in an anxious state. He receives a phone call from his broker. His investment gamble has fizzled, while Matilda's stock he sold to Webster has increased enormously in value. Ina Heath appears unexpectedly, startling Lucy and Matilda, and dismaying Clemmie. It is clear he has misled her into thinking he is wealthy. A tough cabaret dancer, she has her standards: she would never have let Clemmie give her gifts if she had known his humble background. She puts the expensive fur coat he gave her on a chair and leaves. Clemmie breaks down and tells Clem the whole story: how he embezzled the firm's money for gifts to impress Ina, sold Matilda's stock to Webster for capital to invest to make good the deficit, only to lose that as well. Worse, he has deliberately let Matilda think Clem took the stock. Clem gives him a tongue-lashing then tells him to keep his mouth shut around the family; he will deal with Cousin Webster. Getting the market value of the stock from Clemmie, Clem calls Webster and arranges a meeting at his bank. (Curtain)

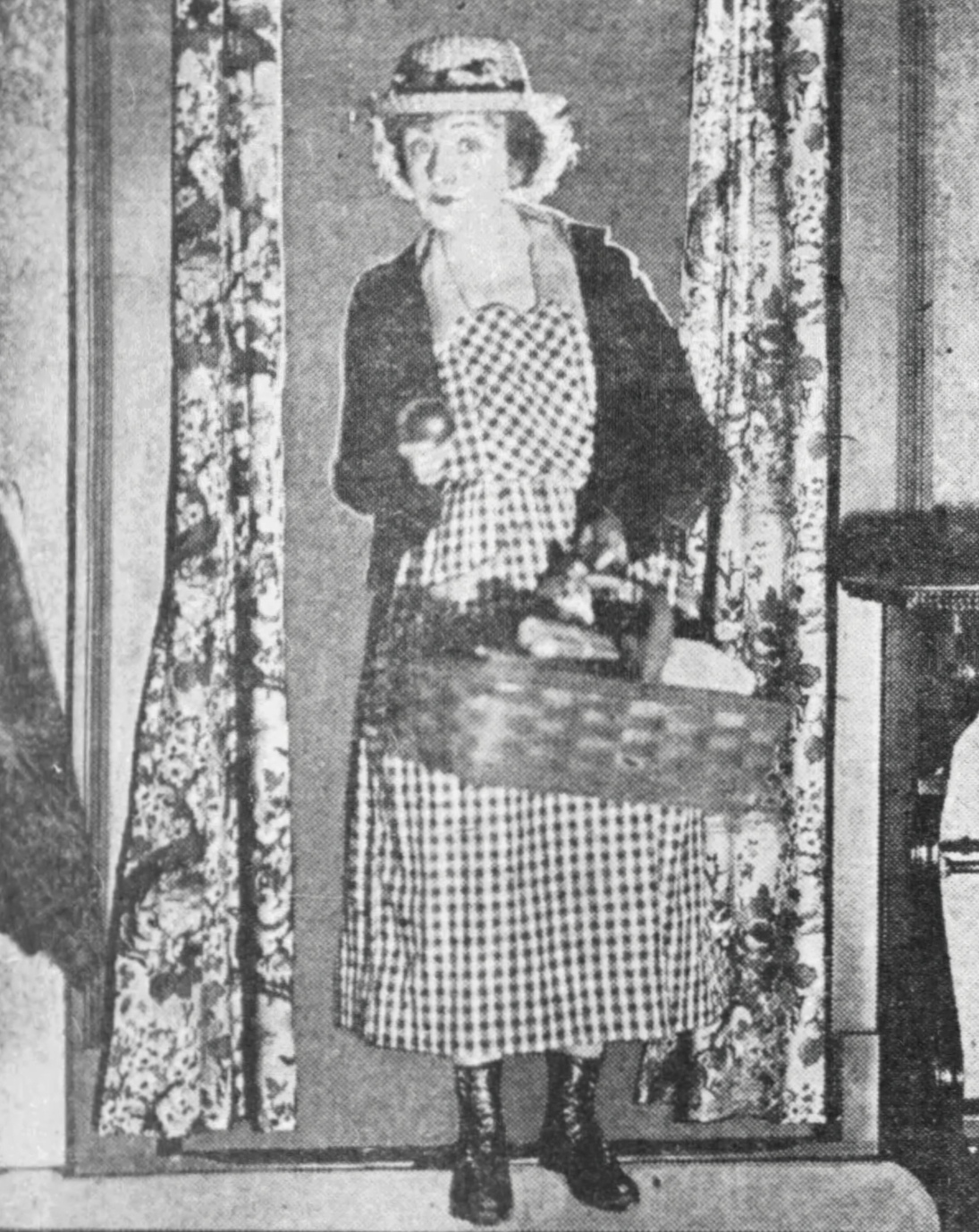
Eva Williams as Nellie

Act III (Scene 1: Webster Parson's Bank. A half-hour later.) Al and Webster are alone in the bank while the latter waits for Clem. Al reminds Webster that they are partners and cautions him about the village constable, who has helped Federal officers bust a roadhouse. Webster is anxious that Al leave before Clem sees him; he does not want his part in financing local bootlegging known. But Clem meets Al while Webster is in his office. Al tells Clem he has partners in bootlegging, and gives him a fancy metal cigar lighter before leaving. Clem confronts Webster with a demand for $10,000, the balance of what Matilda's stock sold for on the market. Webster refuses, but then gives in when threatened with exposure as a bootlegger. Clem asks for the money in $100 bills. As Webster opens the cash drawer, Clem pushes the cigar lighter in his coat pocket out as if it were a gun barrel. Webster hesitates, and Clem steps around him to pull a revolver from the cash drawer. Webster then counts out the money. (Curtain)

Act III (Scene 2: Same as Act I. A few minutes later.) Clemmie has confessed to taking the stock and letting Clem be blamed. Matilda excoriates him for being weak and a coward, and turns on Lucy when she tries to defend her brother. But most of all she blames herself, for doubting Clem. Nellie lets Tom Ogden in; he has come to reconcile with Lucy. Now Clem arrives, and dumps one-hundred $100 bills onto a table. Not knowing Clemmie has confessed, he tries to credit his son for the windfall from the stock sale. He bids Clemmie to take a couple thousand for a "commission", which would be used to reimburse his office accounts. Clem is nonplussed when Matilda says she knows all. Clem then rallies and shows the cigar lighter, claiming it as his long-heralded "device", the invention that has recouped the family fortunes. The family allows him his momentary triumph but are not fooled. Nellie announces that the supper is ruined from waiting, so they decide to go out to eat. As the family exits, Nellie quietly tells Clem, "Al's here!" Clem pauses as Al cautiously enters and slips him a flask. (Curtain)

== Original production ==
=== Background ===
Don Marquis had a daily newspaper column, first as "The Sun Dial" in The Sun, second as "The Lantern" in the New-York Tribune. The columns featured several fictitious characters Marquis had created, who would offer opinions through the medium of letters to the columnist. The Old Soak joined this coterie in early 1920, much to the consternation of an earlier character, Hermione, a suffragist and Greenwich Village free-thinker, who described the latest addition as "obnoxious and illiterate". With the enforcement of the Volstead Act beginning on January 17, 1920, the Old Soak's melancholy over prohibition of "likker" and nostalgia for "the ole days" became popular among readers. Don Marquis said producer John D. Williams and actor Henry E. Dixey independently suggested a play based on the character, but he did not start writing until another producer, Philip Goodman, "bought the play on faith". Goodman sold it to Arthur Hopkins, who helped Marquis correct some structural issues.

Hopkins put the play into rehearsal by early August 1922, with Harry Beresford as the lead, and Cleon Throckmorton designing the sets. At this point a name change to The Old Man was considered, then dropped.

=== Cast ===
Cast from the Harrisburg and Allentown tryouts through the Broadway run.
Role	Actor	Dates	Notes and sources
Clem Hawley	Harry Beresford	Aug 14, 1922 - Jun 2, 1923	
Matilda Hawley	Minnie Dupree	Aug 14, 1922 - Jun 2, 1923	
Cousin Webster	Robert McWade	Aug 14, 1922 - Jun 2, 1923	
Clem Hawley, Jr	George Le Guere	Aug 14, 1922 - Jun 2, 1923	
Al	Robert E. O'Connor	Aug 14, 1922 - Jun 2, 1923	Not to be confused with the Robert O'Connor who performed in the musical Glory the same season.
Lucy Hawley	Helene Sinnott	Aug 14, 1922 - Jun 2, 1923	
Tom Ogden	Grant Mills	Aug 14, 1922 - Jun 2, 1923	
Nellie	Eva Williams	Aug 14, 1922 - Jun 2, 1923	
Ina Heath	Mary Philips	Aug 14, 1922 - Jun 2, 1923	

=== Tryouts ===
The Old Soak had a three-day tryout at the Orpheum Theatre in Harrisburg, Pennsylvania, starting August 14, 1922. The reviewer for The Evening News said the audience was quite small on opening night, with producer Arthur Hopkins and author Don Marquis both in attendance. Max Robertson in the Harrisburg Telegraph proclaimed it "constant good comedy", ascribing its success mainly to the writing but also a superb cast, among which Harry Beresford as Clem, Robert E. O'Connor as Al, and Eva Williams as Nellie stood out.

The production then opened August 17, 1922 at the Lyric Theatre in Allentown, Pennsylvania, for another three-day tryout. The local reviewer said the audience greatly appreciated the comedy and praised the entire cast for excellent performances.

=== Broadway premiere and reception ===
The play had its Broadway premiere at the Plymouth Theatre on Tuesday, August 22, 1922. Lawrence Reamer suggested the genesis of the play may have been the recent success of Dulcy, based on another newspaper columnist's character. He acknowledged the plot and character types were standard, but rendered enjoyable by the authors "unhackneyed" way of treating them, and said the audience was constantly amused. Percy Hammond felt the character of the Old Soak came across better on stage than in the newspaper, and said fellow first night viewers John Barrymore and John Farrar also thought the play had merit. Alexander Woollcott also considered that Dulcy may have inspired The Old Soak but thought the slightly older Lightnin' a more suitable candidate. Woollcott also thought it a typical play of sentiment, redeemed by charm and humor in the writing and performances.

The line "Al's here!", uttered by the character of Nellie whenever the bootlegger showed up in the play, quickly became a popular catchphrase, and was inserted into advertising for the play. Long after the premiere, Heywood Broun revealed that he had won money playing poker with Don Marquis, and realized afterwards that Marquis had deliberately let him win in order to put Broun in a sweet mood to review the play. Marquis confirmed this suspicion in a later column, confessing how hard he worked to lose to Broun, a notoriously wretched poker player.

During June 1922, Burns Mantle included The Old Soak among the top ten plays of the season in The Best Plays of 1922-23.

=== Broadway closing ===
The Old Soak closed at the Plymouth Theatre on Saturday, June 2, 1923, after 337 performances. (Note: This included 335 performances as recorded in the New York Daily News daily feature, "The Golden Dozen", on June 2, 1923, plus the matinee and evening performances for that last day. For unknown reasons, Burns Mantle reported 423 performances in The Best Plays of 1922-23, however, The New York Times confirms the lower figure based on numbers provided by Variety.)

== Adaptations ==
=== Film ===
- The Old Soak (1926) - A Universal silent film, adapted by Charles Kenyon and directed by Edward Sloman, it starred Jean Hersholt in the title role.
- The Good Old Soak (1937) - An MGM film, adapted by A. E. Thomas and directed by J. Walter Ruben, it starred Wallace Beery and had Robert McWade reprising his role as Webster from the Broadway play.

== Bibliography ==
- Burns Mantle (ed). The Best Plays of 1922-23 And The Year Book Of The Drama In America. Dodd, Mead and Company, 1961 (1923).
- Don Marquis. The Old Soak: A Comedy in Three Acts. Samuel French, 1926.
