= Philip Goodman (producer) =

Philip Goodman

Philip Goodman (c. 1885 – July 20, 1940) was an American publisher and theatrical producer. After an early career in advertising and copy writing he entered show business, starting with The Old Soak in 1922, followed by Broadway musicals including Poppy, The Ramblers, Rainbow, and The Five O'Clock Girl. Goodman was a friend of author H. L. Mencken and published two of his books. Goodman's memoir, Franklin Street, describing his childhood in Philadelphia, was published posthumously in 1942 and adapted into a stage comedy by his daughter, Ruth Goetz, and her husband the same year.
