= USS Don Marquis =

United States Navy ship

History

United States
- Name: Don Marquis
- Namesake: Don Marquis
- Builder: California Shipbuilding Corporation, Los Angeles
- Yard number: 245
- Way number: 1
- Laid down: 31 July 1943
- Launched: 23 August 1943
- Acquired: 31 May 1945
- In service: 31 May 1945
- Out of service: Date unknown
- Stricken: 5 June 1946
- Fate: Returned to the War Shipping Administration, 28 November 1945; Scrapped, 1949

General characteristics
- Type: Liberty ship
- Displacement: 4,023 long tons (4,088 t) light; 14,250 long tons (14,479 t) full
- Length: 441 ft 7 in (134.59 m)
- Beam: 56 ft 11 in (17.35 m)
- Draft: 27 ft 7 in (8.41 m)
- Propulsion: Triple expansion reciprocating steam engine, single propeller, 2,500 shp (1,864 kW)
- Speed: 11 knots (20 km/h; 13 mph)
- Range: 17,000 nmi (31,000 km)

USS Don Marquis (IX-215), an unclassified miscellaneous vessel, was the only ship of the United States Navy to be named for that writer, poet, and artist. Her keel was laid down by the California Shipbuilding Corporation, in Los Angeles, California, as a Type EC2-S-C1 hull under Maritime Commission contract number 1874. She was launched on 23 August 1943.

She was acquired and placed in service by the Navy on 31 May 1945. She was employed as dry floating storage in the Pacific until returned to the War Shipping Administration on 28 November 1945. On 26 September, 1944, near Manus, New Guinea, while carrying highly explosive ammunition, USS Don Marquis was rammed at night by a tanker, burst into flames and began settling by the head. She was assisted by USS Donaldson DE-44 and USS Crowley DE-303, which were operating in the area. She was declared a total loss on 27 September 1944. Don Marquis was stricken from the Naval Vessel Register on 5 June 1946.
