= Don Marquis =

American writer (1878–1937)

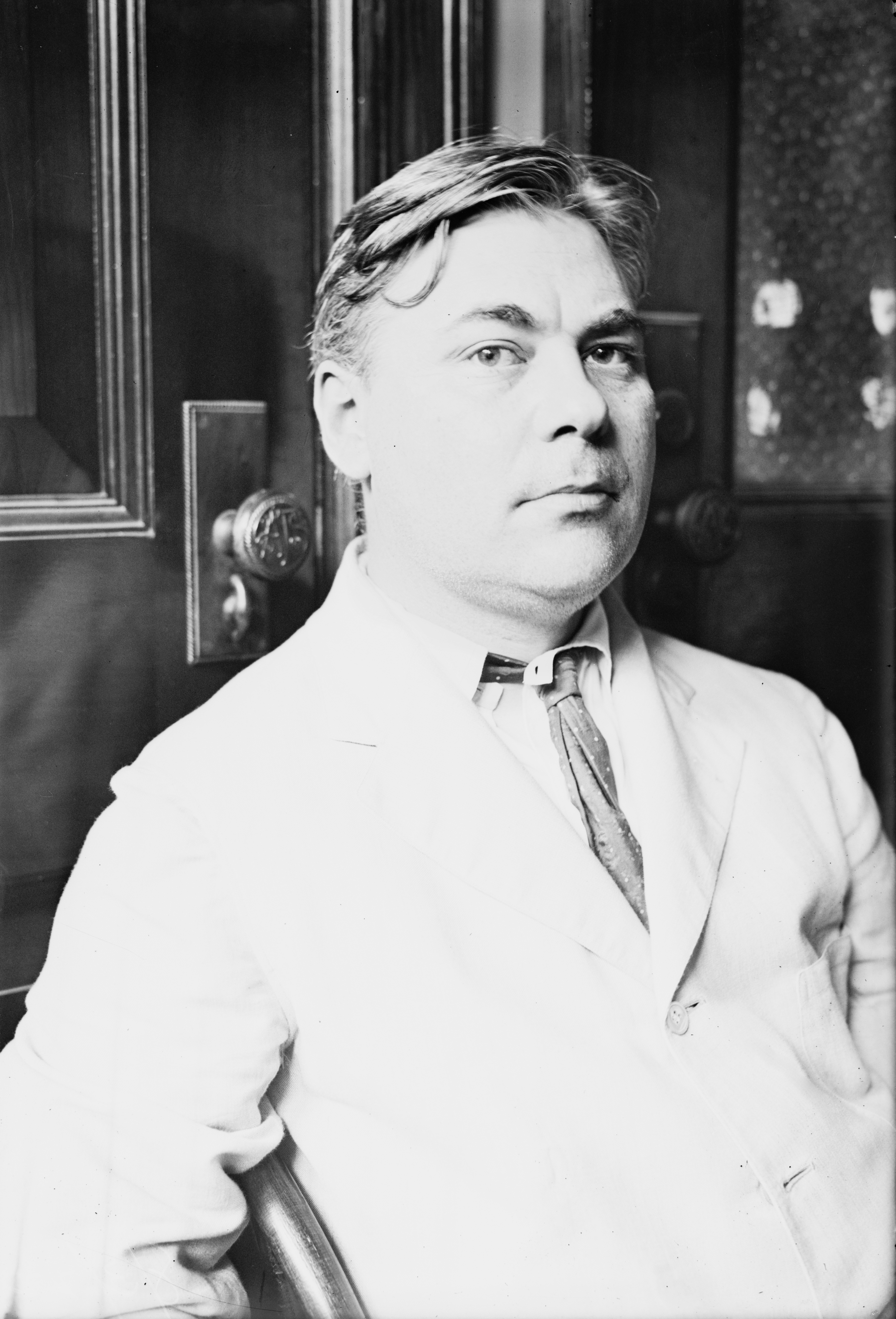
Don Marquis, early, 1910s

Donald Robert Perry Marquis (/ˈmɑːrkwɪs/ MAR-kwis; July 29, 1878 – December 29, 1937) was an American humorist, journalist, and author. He was variously a novelist, poet, newspaper columnist, and playwright. He is remembered best for creating the characters Archy and Mehitabel, Archy being a supposed author of humorous verse. During his lifetime he was equally famous for creating another fictitious character, "the Old Soak," who was the subject of two books, a hit Broadway play (1922–23), a silent film (1926) and a talkie (1937).

== Life ==
Marquis was born to James Stuart Marquis (1816–1897) and Elizabeth Virginia Marquis (née Whitmore, 1834–1915), and he grew up in the small village of Walnut, Illinois. His brother David died in 1892 at the age of 20; his father James, a medical doctor from Ohio died in 1897. His mother had been born in Virginia. After graduating from Walnut High School in 1894, he attended Knox Academy, a now-defunct preparatory program run by Knox College, in 1896, but left after three months.

In 1909, Marquis married Reina Melcher, with whom he had a son, Robert (1915–1921), and a daughter, Barbara (1918–1931).

Reina died on December 2, 1923, and three years later Marquis married the actress Marjorie Potts Vonnegut, whose first husband, the actor Walter Vonnegut, was a cousin of Kurt Vonnegut Jr., the bestselling author, playwright and satirist. Marjorie died in her sleep on October 25, 1936.

Marquis died of a stroke in New York City, after suffering three other strokes that partly disabled him.

On August 23, 1943, the United States Navy christened a Liberty ship, the USS Don Marquis (IX-215), in his memory.

== Career ==
In 1900, Marquis began working with the Census Bureau in Washington, D.C. In 1902 he became an associate editor of the Atlanta News and in 1904 moved to the Atlanta Journal newspaper, where in 1907 as a member of the editorial board he wrote many editorials during the heated gubernatorial election between his publisher Hoke Smith and future Pulitzer Prize winner, Clark Howell (Smith was the victor). In 1907, he began work as an associate editor at Joel Chandler Harris' newly launched Uncle Remus Magazine, where he met his first wife Reina, who was a contributor to the magazine.

In 1912 he began work for the New York Evening Sun, and edited for the next eleven years a daily column, "The Sun Dial". In 1922 he left The Evening Sun (shortened to The Sun in 1920) for the New York Tribune (renamed the New York Herald Tribune in 1924), where his daily column, "The Tower" (later "The Lantern") was a great success. He regularly contributed columns and short stories to the Saturday Evening Post, Collier's and American magazines and also appeared in Harper's, Scribner's, Golden Book, and Cosmopolitan.

Marquis's best-known creation was Archy, a fictional cockroach who first appeared in his newspaper column on March 29, 1916. Archy had been a free-verse poet in a previous life, and supposedly left poems on Marquis's typewriter by jumping on the keys, letter by letter. He typed only lower-case letters, without punctuation, because he could not operate the shift key. His verses were a type of social satire, and appeared regularly in Marquis' newspaper columns. Mehitabel, an alley cat and occasional companion of Archy, was the subject of some of Archy's verses. The Archy and Mehitabel book collections were illustrated by cartoonist George Herriman, better known to posterity as the author and artist of the newspaper comic strip Krazy Kat. Other characters developed by Marquis included Pete the Pup, Clarence the Ghost, an anti-prohibitionist drinker known as "The Old Soak", a bohemian Greenwich Village character named Hermione, and an egomaniacal toad named Warty Bliggins.

Marquis was the author of about 35 books. He co-wrote (or contributed posthumously to) the films The Sports Pages, Shinbone Alley, The Good Old Soak and Skippy. The 1926 film The Cruise of the Jasper B was supposedly based on his 1916 novel of the same name, although the plots have little in common.

== Publications ==
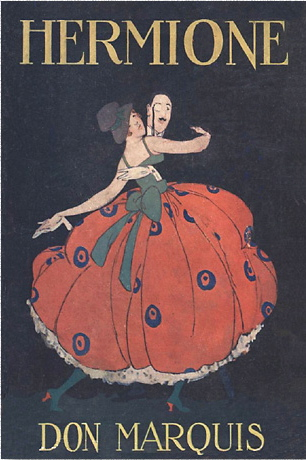
Front dust jacket art by Thelma Cudlipp for Hermione and Her Little Group of Serious Thinkers, 1916.

- 1912: Danny's Own Story (novel)
- 1915: Dreams & Dust (poems)
- 1916: The Cruise of the Jasper B. (novel)
- 1916: Hermione and Her Little Group of Serious Thinkers (sketches)
- 1919: Prefaces (essays)
- 1921: The Old Soak and Hail and Farewell (sketches) Dramatized 1921, 1926, 1937.
- 1921: Carter and Other People (short stories)
- 1921: Noah an' Jonah an' Cap'n John Smith (poems, sketches)
- 1922: Poems and Portraits (poems)
- 1922: Sonnets to a Red-Haired Lady and Famous Love Affairs (poems)
- 1922: The Revolt of the Oyster (short stories)
- 1924: The Dark Hours (play) This play about the trial, passion and crucifixion of Jesus premiered on 14 March 1932 at the Maryland Theatre in Baltimore, Maryland. Bretaigne Windust directed the University Players with a cast of more than 50, which included Joshua Logan as Caiaphas, Charles Crane Leatherbee as Pilate, Henry Fonda as Peter, and Kent Smith as Jesus. The play subsequently opened on Broadway on 14 November 1932 and ran 8 performances.
- 1924: Pandora Lifts the Lid (novel)
- 1924: Words and Thoughts (play)
- 1924: The Awakening (poems)
- 1927: Out of the Sea (play)
- 1927: The Almost Perfect State (essays)
- 1927: archy and mehitabel (poems, sketches)
- 1928: Love Sonnets of a Cave Man (poems)
- 1928: When the Turtles Sing (short stories)
- 1929: A Variety of People (short stories)
- 1930: Off the Arm (novel)
- 1933: archys life of mehitabel (poems, sketches)
- 1934: Master of the Revels (play)
- 1934: Chapters for the Orthodox (short stories)
- 1935: archy does his part (poems, sketches)
- 1936: Sun Dial Time (short stories)
- 1939: Sons of the Puritans (novel)
- 1940: the lives and times of archy and mehitabel (omnibus)
- 1946: The Best of Don Marquis (omnibus)
- 1978: Everything's Jake (play)
- 1982: Selected Letters of Don Marquis (letters) Edited by William McCollum Jr.
- 1996: archyology (poems, sketches) Edited by Jeff Adams.
- 1998: archyology ii (poems, sketches) Edited by Jeff Adams.
- 2006: The Annotated Archy and Mehitabel (poems, sketches) Edited by Michael Sims.

== See also ==
- Franklin Pierce Adams
- Heywood Broun
- Christopher Morley

== General and cited references ==
- "Humor's sober side: Being an interview with Don Marquis, another of a series on how humorists get that way by Josephine van der Grift," Bisbee Daily Review, October 13, 1922, p. 4.
