= Edith Evans – stage and film roles =

The English actress Edith Evans, appeared in a wide range of stage and screen productions. After playing in amateur productions she turned professional in 1912 under the tutelage of the director William Poel. She came to wide public notice in 1924 with her performance as Millamant in The Way of the World and for the next fifty years was one of the leading performers on the British stage. She played several seasons on Broadway and made occasional appearances in continental Europe.

After briefly working in silent films during the First World War, Evans made no more screen appearances until after the Second. From 1949 to 1977 she made nineteen films. Two of them captured her celebrated stage performances: Lady Bracknell in The Importance of Being Earnest and Mrs St Maugham in Enid Bagnold's The Chalk Garden. In some films she played supporting character roles, and in others took a leading part, notably The Whisperers in 1967 for which she received several awards and an Oscar nomination.

Evans can also be heard in sound recordings of two of her most famous roles - Lady Bracknell in The Importance of Being Earnest, opposite John Gielgud, and the Nurse in the Caedmon Records production of Romeo and Juliet.

== Theatre ==
Year	Play	Role	Venue London, unless otherwise stated
1912	Sakuntalá	Gautaumi	Cambridge University
1912	Troilus and Cressida	Cressida	King's Hall, Covent Garden
1913	Elizabeth Cooper	Martin	Haymarket
1914	Hamlet	Gertrude	Little Theatre
1914	The Ladies' Comedy	Isota	Little Theatre
1914	Acid Drops	Mrs Taylor	Royalty
1914	My Lady's Dress	Moeder Kaatje and Miss Sylvia	Royalty
1914	Milestones	Mrs Rhead	Royalty
1916	The Conference	Lady Frances Ponsonby	Court
1916	The Man Who Stayed at Home	Miss Myrtle	Royalty
1918	The Dead City	Nurse	Court
1918	The Merry Wives of Windsor (basket scene, in variety)	Mistress Ford	London Coliseum and on tour
1918	The Merchant of Venice (trial scene, in variety)	Nerissa	London Coliseum and on tour
1918	Manfred	Witch of the Alps and Destiny	Drury Lane
1919	The Player Queen	Nona	King's Hall, Covent Garden
1919	The Merchant of Venice	Nerissa	Court
1920	My Lady's Dress	Moeder Kaatje and Lady Appleby	Royalty
1920	Wedding Bells	Mrs Hunter	Playhouse
1920	Venice Preserv'd	Aquilina	Lyric, Hammersmith
1921	Daniel	Madame Girard	St James's
1921	Mother Eve	Mrs Chester	Ambassadors
1921	Polly With a Past	Mrs Van Zile	St James's
1921	The Witch of Edmonton	Anne Ratcliffe	Lyric, Hammersmith
1921	Out to Win	Mrs Barraclough	Shaftesbury
1921	Heartbreak House	Lady Utterword	Court
1922	The Wheel	Mrs Faraker	Apollo
1922	All for Love	Cleopatra	Shaftesbury
1922	I Serve	Kate Harding	Kingsway
1922	The Laughing Lady	Cynthia Dell	Globe
1922	Rumour	Ruby	Globe
1923	Taffy	Marged	Prince of Wales
1923	Back to Methuselah	The Serpent, the Oracle, the She Ancient, the Ghost of the Serpent	Birmingham Repertory
1923	The Merry Wives of Windsor	Mistress Page	Lyric, Hammersmith
1924	The Way of the World	Millamant	Lyric, Hammersmith
1924	The Adding Machine	Daisy Devore	Strand
1924	Tiger Cats	Suzanne	Savoy
1924	Getting Married	Mrs George Collins	Everyman, Hampstead
1924	Back to Methuselah	The Serpent, the She Ancient	Court
1924	A Midsummer Night's Dream	Helena	Drury Lane
1925	The Painted Swan	Ann	Everyman, Hampstead
1925	The Merchant of Venice	Portia	Old Vic
1925	Richard III	Queen Margaret	Old Vic
1925	The Taming of the Shrew	Katherina	Old Vic
1925	Measure for Measure	Mariana	Old Vic
1925	Antony and Cleopatra	Cleopatra	Old Vic
1925	The Child in Flanders	Vision	Old Vic
1925	The Merry Wives of Windsor	Mistress Page	Old Vic
1926	She Stoops To Conquer	Kate Hardcastle	Old Vic
1926	Julius Caesar	Portia	Old Vic
1926	As You Like It	Rosalind	Old Vic
1926	Everyman		Old Vic
1926	Romeo and Juliet	Nurse	Old Vic
1926	The Shoemaker's Holiday	Dame Margery Eyre	Old Vic
1926	Much Ado About Nothing	Beatrice	Old Vic
1926	Caroline	Maude Fulton	Playhouse
1926	Rosmersholm	Rebecca West	Kingsway
1927	The Beaux' Stratagem	Mrs Sullen	Lyric, Hammersmith
1927	The Lady in Law	Maître Bolbec	Wyndham's
1927	The Way of the World	Millamant	Wyndham's
1928	Back to Methuselah	The Serpent, the ghost of the Serpent	Court
1928	The Tragic Muse	Miriam Rooth	Arts
1928	Napoleon's Josephine	Josephine	Fortune
1929	The Lady with a Lamp	Florence Nightingale	Arts (transferred to Garrick)
1929	The Apple Cart	Orinthia	Malvern Festival
1929	Heartbreak House	Lady Utterword	Malvern Festival
1929	The Apple Cart	Orinthia	Queen's
1930	The Beaux' Stratagem	Mrs Sullen	Royalty
1930	Delilah	Delilah	Prince of Wales
1931	OHMS	Mrs Carruthers	Arts (transferred to New)
1931	Tiger Cats	Suzanne	Royalty
1931	The Old Bachelor	Laetitia	Lyric, Hammersmith
1931	The Lady with a Lamp	Florence Nightingale	Maxine Elliott Theatre, New York
1932	Othello	Emilia	Old Vic
1932	Twelfth Night	Viola	Old Vic
1932	Heartbreak House	Lady Utterword	Queen's
1932	Evensong	Irela	Queen's
1932	Bulldog Drummond	Irma Petersen	Adelphi
1933	Evensong	Irela	Selwyn Theatre, New York
1933	Once in a Lifetime	May Daniels	Queen's
1933	The Late Christopher Bean	Gwenny	St James's
1934	Viceroy Sarah	Duchess of Marlborough	Arts
1934	Romeo and Juliet	Nurse	Martin Beck Theatre, New York
1935	The Old Ladies	Agatha Payne	New
1935	Romeo and Juliet	Nurse	New
1936	The Seagull	Arkadina	New
1936	The Country Wife	Lady Fidget	Old Vic
1936	As You Like It	Rosalind	Old Vic
1936	The Witch of Edmonton	Mother Savage	Old Vic
1937	As You Like It	Rosalind	New
1937	The Taming of The Shrew	Katherina	New
1937	Robert's Wife	Sanchia Carson	Globe
1939	The Importance of Being Earnest	Lady Bracknell	Globe and on tour
1940	Cousin Muriel	Muriel Meilhac	Globe
1940	Diversion (revue)	various	Wyndham's
1941	Diversion No 2 (revue)	various	Wyndham's
1941	Old Acquaintance	Katherine Markham	Apollo
1942	The Importance of Being Earnest	Lady Bracknell	Phoenix
1942	ENSA revue	various	Gibraltar
1943	Heartbreak House	Hesione Hushabye	Cambridge
1944	The Late Christopher Bean	Gwenny	India (ENSA tour)
1945	The Rivals	Mrs Malaprop	Criterion
1946	Crime and Punishment	Katerina	New
1946	Antony and Cleopatra	Cleopatra	Piccadilly
1948	The Way of the World	Lady Wishfort	New
1948	The Cherry Orchard	Ranevskaya	New
1949	Daphne Laureola	Lady Pitts	Wyndham's
1950	Daphne Laureola	Lady Pitts	Music Box Theatre, New York
1951	Waters of the Moon	Helen Lancaster	Haymarket
1954	The Dark Is Light Enough	Countess Rosmarin Ostenburg	Aldwych
1956	The Chalk Garden	Mrs St Maugham	Haymarket
1958	Henry VIII	Queen Katherine	Old Vic, and toured to Paris, Antwerp, and Brussels
1959	All's Well That Ends Well	Countess of Rousillon	Shakespeare Memorial Theatre, Stratford
1959	Coriolanus	Volumnia	Shakespeare Memorial Theatre, Stratford
1961	Richard III	Queen Margaret	Royal Shakespeare Theatre, Stratford
1961	Romeo and Juliet	Nurse	Royal Shakespeare Theatre, Stratford
1963	Gentle Jack	Violet	Queen's
1964	Hay Fever	Judith Bliss	Old Vic
1965	The Chinese Prime Minister	Mrs Forest	Globe
1968	Aerial Football and The Black Girl in Search of God	Narrator	Mermaid
1971	Dear Antoine	Carlotta	Chichester Festival
1974	Edith Evans and Friends	Reciter	Haymarket

Sources: Who's Who in the Theatre, and Who's Who, except where noted in fourth column

== Filmography ==
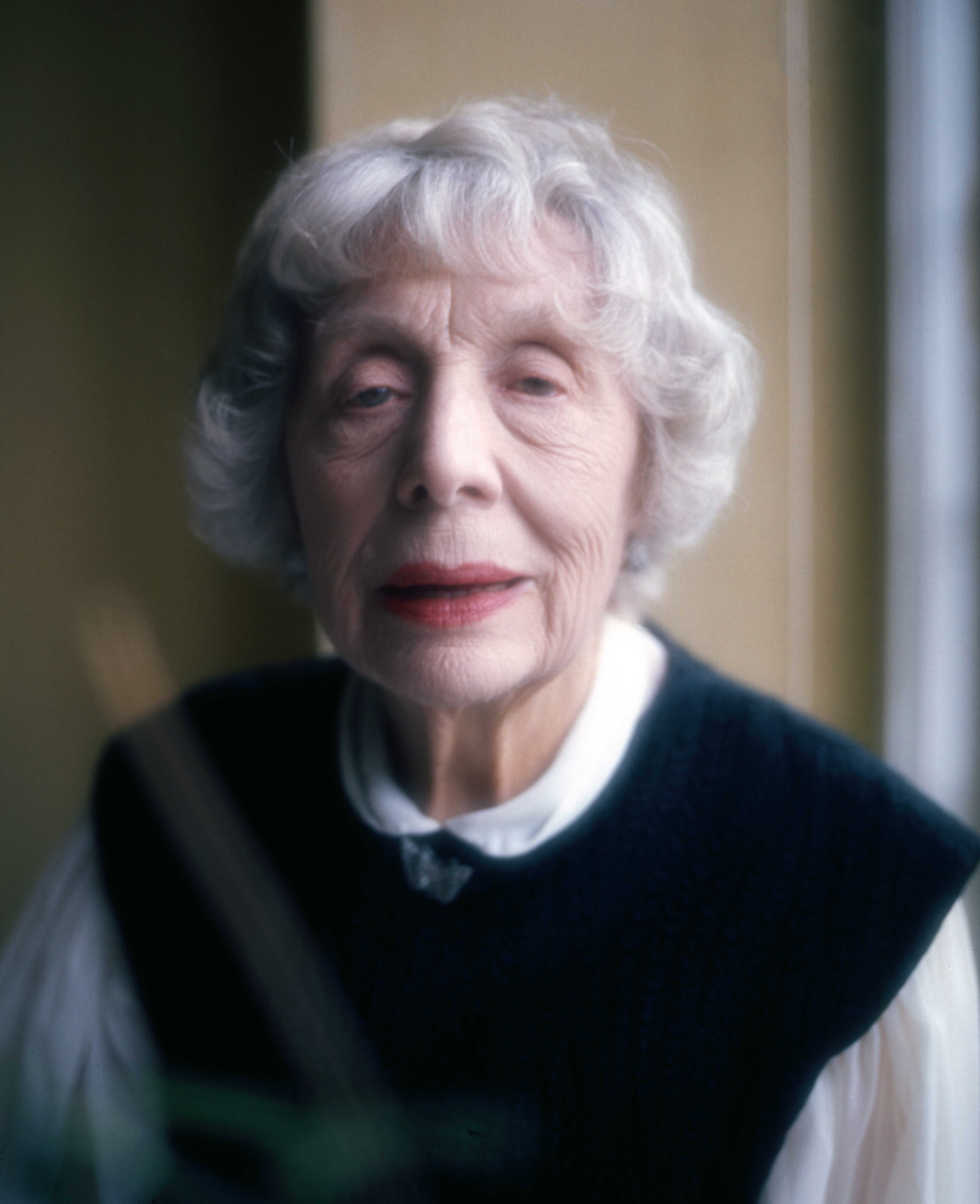
Edith Evans photographed in 1972 by Allan Warren

Year	Title	Role	Notes
1915	Honeymoon for Three		
1915	A Welsh Singer	Mrs Pomfrey	
1916	East Is East	Aunt	
1949	The Queen of Spades	The Old Countess Ranevskaya	
1949	The Last Days of Dolwyn	Merri	aka Women of Dolwyn
1952	The Importance of Being Earnest	Augusta Lady Bracknell	
1958	Look Back in Anger	Mrs Tanner	
1959	The Nun's Story	Rev Mother Emmanuel	(as Dame Edith Evans); National Board of Review Award for Best Supporting Actress; Nominated – Golden Globe Award for Best Supporting Actress – Motion Picture
1963	Tom Jones	Miss Western	Nominated – Academy Award for Best Supporting Actress; Nominated – BAFTA Award for Best British Actress
1964	The Chalk Garden	Mrs St Maugham	National Board of Review Award for Best Supporting Actress; Nominated – Academy Award for Best Supporting Actress; Nominated – BAFTA Award for Best British Actress
1965	Young Cassidy	Lady Gregory	
1967	The Whisperers	Mrs Maggie Ross	BAFTA Award for Best British Actress; Silver Bear for Best Actress (Berlin); Golden Globe Award for Best Actress – Motion Picture Drama; National Board of Review Award for Best Actress; New York Film Critics Circle Award for Best Actress; Nominated – Academy Award for Best Actress
1967	Fitzwilly	Miss Victoria Woodworth	
1968	Prudence and the Pill	Lady Roberta Bates	
1969	Crooks and Coronets	Lady Sophie Fitzmore	
1969	The Madwoman of Chaillot	Josephine	
1970	David Copperfield	Aunt Betsy Trotwood	TV movie
1970	Scrooge	Ghost of Christmas Past	
1973	A Doll's House	Anne-Marie	
1973	El caballo torero		
1974	QB VII	Dr. Parmentier	1 episode
1974	Craze	Aunt Louise Nash	
1976	The Slipper and the Rose	Dowager Queen	
1977	Nasty Habits	Sister Hildegard	(final film role); Posthumous Release
