= Platonov (play) =

Play by Anton Chekhov

Platonov (Russian: Платонов, also known as Fatherlessness and A Play Without a Title) is the name in English given to an early, untitled play in four acts written by Anton Chekhov in 1878. It was the first large-scale drama by Chekhov, written specifically for Maria Yermolova, rising star of Maly Theatre. Yermolova rejected the play and it was not published until 1923.

The lead character is Mikhail Platonov, a disillusioned provincial schoolmaster. The play is set in a dilapidated country house in the Russian provinces. Landowner Anna Petrovna, Sofia Yegorovna, wife of Anna Petrovna's stepson, and one of his colleagues fall in love with the married Platonov. He thinks society is without ideas and principles, but is aware that he himself is very much part of that society. He is compared to Hamlet and Don Juan, and likes to think of himself as a witty and intellectually stimulating entertainer. In the end, he recognises his hopeless position between the four women and retreats into alcohol. Finally, Sofia understands that she cannot hope for a new life with Platonov and shoots him.

== Publication and performance history ==
=== Full translations into English ===
- Platonov: A Play in Four Acts and Five Scenes. Translated by David Magarshack (Faber and Faber, 1964).
- Platonov. Translated by Ronald Hingley, The Oxford Chekhov. Volume II: Platonov, Ivanov, The Seagull, edited by Ronald Hingley (Oxford UP, 1967).
- Untitled Play. Translated by Laurence Senelick, The Complete Plays by Anton Chekhov, translated by Laurence Senelick (W. W. Norton & Company, 2007).

=== Abridged translations into English ===
- That Worthless Fellow Platonov. Translated by John Cournos (J.M. Dent, 1930).
- Don Juan (in the Russian Manner). Translated by Basil Ashmore (Peter Nevill, 1952).
- A Country Scandal. Translated and adapted by Alex Szögyi (Coward-McCann, 1960).
- Platonov: An Abridged Version of an Untitled Play in Four Acts. Translated by Dmitri Makaroff (Methuen, 1961).
- Wild Honey. Translated and adapted by Michael Frayn (Methuen, 1986).
- Platonov. Translated and adapted by Carol Rocamora, Chekhov: The Early Plays, translated and adapted by Carol Rocamora (Smith and Kraus, 1999).
- Platonov. Translated and adapted by David Hare (Faber and Faber, 2001).
- Platonov. Translated by Ani Szamosi, adapted by Susan Coyna and Laszlo Marton (Scirocco Drama, 2001).
- Sons without Fathers: The Untitled Play, Known as Platonov. Translated and adapted by Helena Kaut-Howson (Oberon Books, 2013).
- Platonov. Translated and adapted by John Christopher Jones (Dramatist's Play Service, 2016).

The first unabridged version in English was published in 1964 by Faber and Faber in a translation by David Magarshack.

A widely performed adaptation by playwright Michael Frayn, given the title Wild Honey, debuted at London's National Theatre in 1984, starring Ian McKellen as Platonov. The production won Olivier Awards in three categories, including Actor of the Year in a Revival for McKellen.

Chekhov's own text, which despite a running time of about five hours he never thought of as finished, is seldom played. However, in 1997 the director Lev Dodin and the Maly Theatre of St Petersburg presented a faithful, and once again untitled, version at the annual Weimar summer arts festival Kunstfest Weimar, presented at E-Werke, the city's former central power station. Dodin cut nine characters (and their interlocking sub-plots) but replaced them with a nine-piece jazz band. The running time was four hours. The production was taken to Saint Petersburg and Milan later that year. Five performances were mounted at the Barbican Arts Centre, London, in June 1999.

The work has been adapted and produced at the Almeida Theatre in London in 2001 by David Hare, starring Aidan Gillen (Mikhail) and Helen McCrory (Anna). Platonov was also adapted and produced by the Bristol Old Vic and by the Soulpepper Theatre Company in Toronto. Hare's 2001 version was revived at the Chichester Festival Theatre in 2015 and subsequently transferred to the Royal National Theatre in 2016.

A new version translated and adapted by Ilya Khodosh was produced at the Yale School of Drama in October 2013.

Andrew Upton adapted the play in 2015 under the title The Present for the Sydney Theatre Company where it was directed by John Crowley and performed by Cate Blanchett (Anna), Richard Roxburgh (Mikhail), Jacqueline McKenzie (Sophia), Marshall Napier (Ivan) and Toby Schmitz (Nikolai). That production transferred to Broadway at the Ethel Barrymore Theatre. The play began previews on 17 December 2016, opened 8 January 2017 and closed 19 March 2017. The first time an all-Australian cast has performed on Broadway, it marked the Broadway debut for Blanchett, Roxburgh, McKenzie and the rest of the cast.

== Film and television ==
BBC Television produced a version for their Play of the Month series in 1971 which features Rex Harrison in the title role. In 1977 writer Aleksandr Adabashyan and director Nikita Mikhalkov transformed the work into another film, Неоконченная пьеса для механического пианино (Neokonchennaya pyesa dlya mekhanicheskogo pianino), made in Russian by Mosfilm and released in the west as An Unfinished Piece for Mechanical Piano. This in turn was reworked by Trevor Griffiths into a new stage version called Piano, produced at the Cottesloe Theatre, London, in August 1990. Stephen Rea was Platonov.
