= Edith Evans =

English actress (1888–1976)

Dame Edith Evans DBE
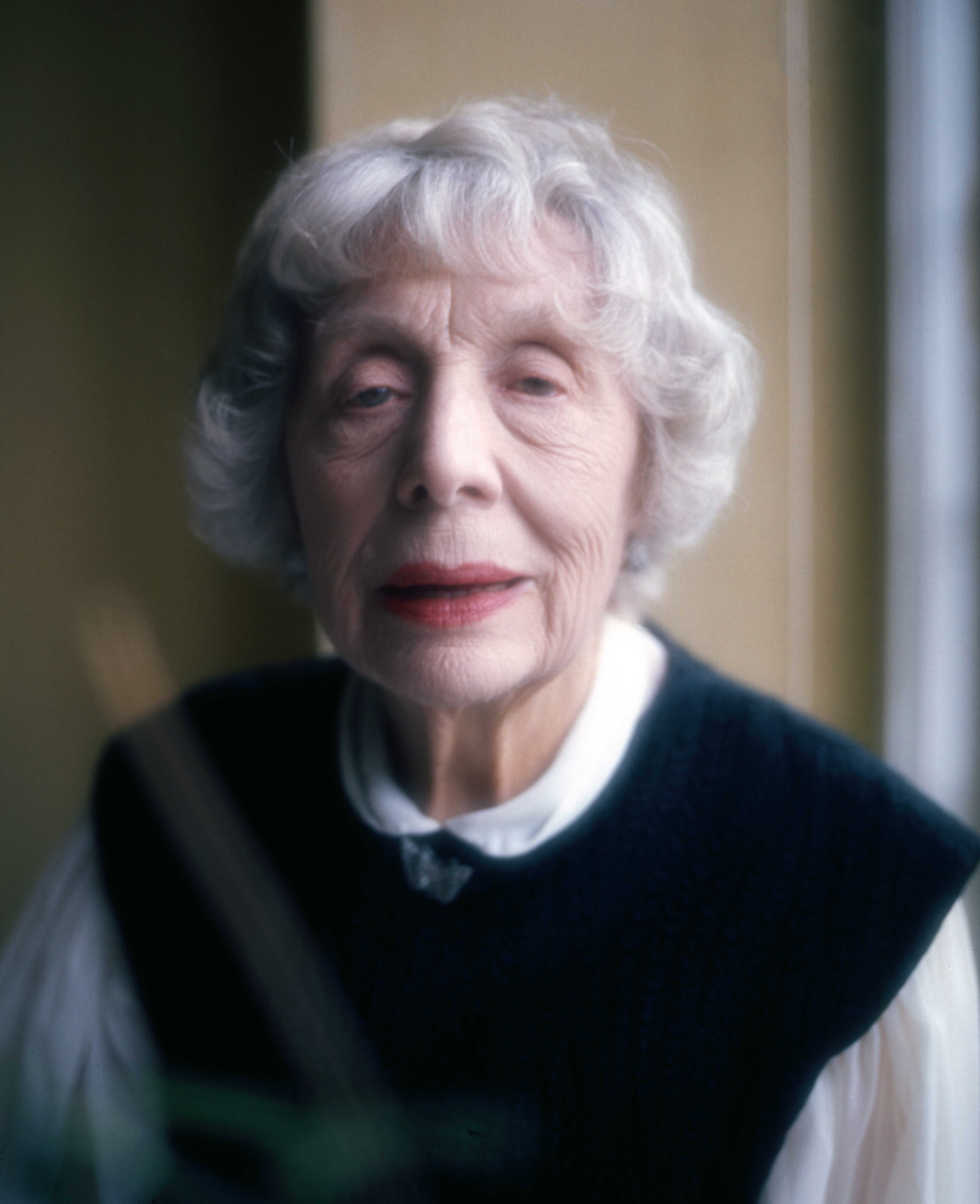
- Dame Edith Evans in a 1972 portrait
- Born: Edith Mary Evans; 8 February 1888; Pimlico, London, England
- Died: 14 October 1976 (aged 88); Cranbrook, Kent, England
- Occupation: Actress
- Years active: 1910–1976
- Spouse: George Booth (m. 1925; died 1935)

Dame Edith Mary Evans (8 February 1888 – 14 October 1976) was an English actress. She was best known for her work on the West End stage, but also appeared in films at the beginning and towards the end of her career. Between 1964 and 1968, she was nominated for three Academy Awards.

Evans's stage career spanned sixty years, during which she played more than 100 roles, in classics by Shakespeare, Congreve, Goldsmith, Sheridan and Wilde, and plays by contemporary writers including Bernard Shaw, Enid Bagnold, Christopher Fry and Noël Coward. She created roles in two of Shaw's plays: Orinthia in The Apple Cart (1929), and Epifania in The Millionairess (1940) and was in the British premières of two others: Heartbreak House (1921) and Back to Methuselah (1923).

Evans became widely known for portraying haughty aristocratic women, as in two of her most famous roles as Lady Bracknell in The Importance of Being Earnest, and Miss Western in the 1963 film of Tom Jones. During her performance as Lady Bracknell, her elongated delivery of the line 'A handbag' has become synonymous with the Oscar Wilde play. By contrast, she played a downtrodden maid in The Late Christopher Bean (1933), an eccentric, impoverished old woman in The Whisperers (1967) and – one of her most celebrated roles – Nurse in Romeo and Juliet, which she played in four productions between 1926 and 1961.

== Life and career ==
=== Early years ===
Evans was born in Pimlico, London, the daughter of Edward Evans, a junior civil servant in the General Post Office, and his wife, Caroline Ellen née Foster. She had one sibling, a brother who died at the age of four. She was educated at St Michael's Church of England School, Pimlico, before being apprenticed at the age of 15 in 1903 as a milliner. She commented in later years that she loved the rich and beautiful materials of the craft, but could not manage to make two hats alike. While working in a milliner's shop in the City she began attending drama classes in Victoria; the classes developed into an amateur performing group, the Streatham Shakespeare Players, with whom she made her first stage appearance in October 1910, as Viola in Twelfth Night. In 1912, playing Beatrice in Much Ado About Nothing, she was spotted by the producer William Poel and made her first professional appearance for him in Cambridge in August of that year; she played Gautami in a 6th-century Hindu classic, Sakuntalá, in a cast including the young Nigel Playfair. Poel then cast her as Cressida in Troilus and Cressida in London and subsequently at Stratford-upon-Avon. The critic of The Manchester Guardian found her diction inadequate, but otherwise approved: "Miss Edith Evans, who, without quite the invincible charm for Cressida, gave an interesting performance".

In The Laughing Lady, 1922

Evans's West End debut was in George Moore's Elizabeth Cooper in 1913. (Note: Moore had intended to cast Evans in the leading role, but was overruled by the theatre management. Instead she played the supporting role of Martin, a maid.) The play received poor notices, but Evans was praised: "In the very small part of a maid Miss Edith Evans made the success of the afternoon. She put more into her few minutes than most of our approved 'stars' can suggest in leading parts." In January 1914 she made her professional Shakespearian debut as Gertrude in Hamlet.

In 1914, at Moore's instigation, Evans was given a year's contract by the Royalty Theatre in Soho. She played character roles in comedies, as a junior member of casts that included Gladys Cooper and Lynn Fontanne. Over the next ten years she polished her craft in a wide range of parts. She played in a silent film called A Welsh Singer, directed by and featuring Henry Edwards in 1915, and also had a minor role in another 1915 film, A Honeymoon for Three, starring Charles Hawtrey. She then appeared in East is East in 1917, but thereafter made no more films for over thirty years. She toured in Shakespeare with Ellen Terry's company in 1918, appeared in light comedy alongside the young Noël Coward (Polly With a Past, 1921) and played five new Shavian roles, Lady Utterword in Heartbreak House (1921) (Note: Evans did not create the role: the play had been given in New York, Vienna and Stockholm before its London production.) and the Serpent, the Oracle, the She-Ancient and the ghost of the Serpent in Back to Methuselah (1923). In 1922 she made what J. T. Grein in The Illustrated London News called "a personal triumph" in Alfred Sutro's comedy The Laughing Lady.

=== Stardom ===
By this time Evans was well known to the critics, and frequently received excellent notices; with her performance as Millamant in The Way of the World in 1924 she achieved wide public fame for the first time. Nigel Playfair cast her as the strong-willed and witty heroine in his revival of Congreve's Restoration comedy at the Lyric Hammersmith, in 1924. The critics resorted to superlatives:

[T]he main pleasure of the evening is due to Miss Edith Evans's Millamant, a part in which she definitely "arrives." This actress imposes herself upon the audience first of all by her Rubens-like vitality. We have always known that she can fill the stage. Physically she may have no more affinity with Congreve than a fiower-girl of Piccadilly Circus, but she has the art and the wit that transfigure the woman and give us the great lady, the coquette, the rogue, and the lover all in one. It was delicious to hear her demand to be "sole empress of her tea-table," but sublime to see her "dwindle into a wife."

James Agate wrote, "Let me not mince matters. Miss Edith Evans is the most accomplished of living and practising English actresses." Arnold Bennett noted in his journals that this Millamant was the finest comedy performance he had ever seen. Her colleagues too were struck by the performance. John Gielgud recalled:

It was as Millamant ... that she took the town by storm. It was a unique and exquisite performance. She purred and challenged, mocked and melted, showing her changing moods by subtly shifting the angles of her head, neck and shoulders. Poised and cool, like a porcelain figure in a vitrine, she used her fan – which she never opened – in the great love scene, as an instrument for attack or defence, now coquettishly pointing it upwards beneath her chin, now resting it languidly against her cheek. Her words flowed on, phrasing and diction balanced in perfect cadences, as she smiled and pouted in delivering her delicious sallies.

In the 1925–26 season, Evans joined the company of the Old Vic, playing Portia in The Merchant of Venice, Cleopatra in Antony and Cleopatra, Katherina in The Taming of the Shrew, Rosalind in As You Like It, Mistress Page in The Merry Wives of Windsor, Beatrice in Much Ado and Nurse in Romeo and Juliet – one of her most celebrated roles. (Note: In The Daily Telegraph W A Darlington called Evans's Nurse "as earthy as a potato, as slow as a cart-horse, and as cunning as a badger".) The schedule of rehearsals and performances was hectic. She recalled, "It was altogether a momentous season for me. I lost 17lb in weight and on the only free day from rehearsal ran off and got married." Her husband was George (Guy) Booth (1882 or 1883–1935), an engineer whom she had known for more than twenty years; there were no children. Marriage to someone unconnected with the theatre suited Evans, who did not share the taste of many of her colleagues for what Gielgud called "publicity, gossip and backstage intrigue".

Looking back in 1976 at Evans's career The Times observed that the two decades after her success as Millamant showed the range of her talent. The paper counted among her "performances of absolute assurance" in this period those in Tiger Cats (1924), The Beaux' Stratagem (1927), The Lady with a Lamp (1929), and The Apple Cart (1929) in which she played Orinthia, the king's mistress, a role written for her by Shaw. (Note: The character was partly modelled on Shaw's leading lady of an earlier generation, Mrs Patrick Campbell. She encountered Evans before the premiere of the play, and was not pleased to learn that the younger actress was to some extent impersonating her. Evans later admitted, "I don't like Orinthia very much.") During the 1930s she played in several Broadway seasons, some productions transferred from London and others new. While she was in New York playing the Nurse opposite Katharine Cornell as Juliet, Evans's husband died suddenly in London. She returned, devastated, and encouraged by colleagues found solace by throwing herself into her work.

Evans's notable roles of the 1930s included Irela in Evensong (1932), Gwenny in The Late Christopher Bean (1933), four Shakespeare parts, and in 1939 Lady Bracknell in The Importance of Being Earnest. She played the last of these on and off for seven years, on tour and in London, and by 1947, when a Broadway run was offered, she declined to act in the piece again. She played Lady Bracknell on film (1952) and television (1960) but never again on the stage.

During the Second World War Evans joined an ENSA company travelling to Gibraltar to entertain Allied troops. The following year she played in a West End revival of Heartbreak House, this time playing Hesione Hushabye. She toured for ENSA in Britain, Europe and India in 1944 and 1945. Returning to London, at the end of the war she played Mrs Malaprop in The Rivals. The production was not liked by the critics, and Evans's performance drew respectful rather than ecstatic reviews.

=== Postwar ===
Evans played Shakespeare's Cleopatra for the last time in 1946–47, in her late fifties. Her performance divided the critics: opinions varied from "an agonising disaster" to "a joy to watch". Kenneth Tynan said, "Lady Bracknell has been involved in a low Alexandrian scandal". Evans had never been classically good looking, but she was a great enough actress to "convey beauty without being conventionally beautiful". What troubled many, including Agate and Gielgud, about her Cleopatra and other tragic heroines was not her appearance but a sense that tragedy came less naturally to her than comedy. Some of the great Shakespearian tragic roles she constantly refused to play, notably Lady Macbeth. She told Gielgud, "I could never impersonate a woman who had such a peculiar notion of hospitality", which he took to mean that she could not contemplate the character's "explicit admission of evil". Evans once remarked, "I don't think there is anything extraordinary about me except this passion for the truth", a passion revered by Gielgud and others, but one that prevented her from attempting a character whose essence she could not understand. She said to Shaw that she had been asked to play Volumnia in Coriolanus, but "isn't she a bloodthirsty old harridan? I could never play her." (Note: Evans eventually undertook the role in 1958 to the Coriolanus of Laurence Olivier.) This did not mean that she had to like the characters she played, but she had to understand them. When she first read through the role of Lady Bracknell with Gielgud she commented, "I know those sort of women. They ring the bell and tell you to put a lump of coal on the fire."

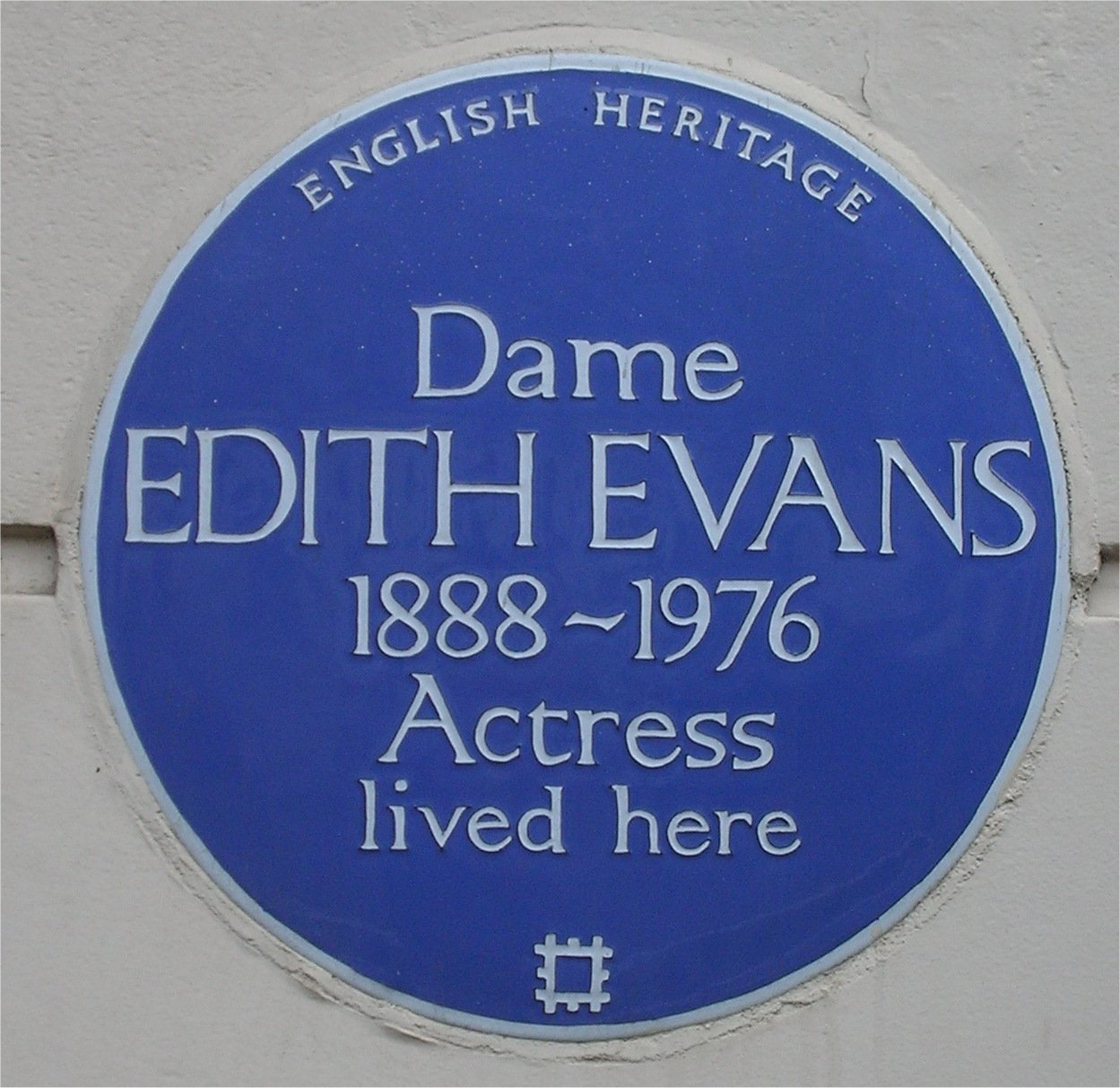
Blue plaque at Evans's home

In 1948 Evans returned to the film studios after an absence of more than thirty years. At the instigation of Emlyn Williams she appeared in The Last Days of Dolwyn. The cast included Williams, Richard Burton, in his first film, and Allan Aynesworth, who had created the role of Algernon in The Importance of Being Earnest in 1895. This was Aynesworth's last film; Evans went on to make eighteen more over the next three decades. She played an elderly Welsh woman, (Note: Despite her typically Welsh surname, and her roles in her first silent film and first talkie, Evans had no Welsh blood.) and was well received by reviewers, although one wondered if she was yet quite at home before the camera: "there are indeed moments when she looks as disproportionate as a life-size Rembrandt in a one-room flatlet. But it is not, of course, the flatlet which stays in the memory". In the same year she played Countess Ranevskaya in Thorold Dickinson's film version of The Queen of Spades. (Note: Authorities differ on which of Evans's 1948 films was made first; The Queen of Spades was released first, in March 1949, with The Last Days of Dolwyn following in April.)

In the theatre, Evans returned to The Way of the World in 1948, exchanging the role of Millamant for that of the formidable old Lady Wishfort. The production received mixed notices, and Evans's Wishfort – "like a preposterous caricature of Queen Elizabeth" – though much admired, overshadowed the rest of the cast. In November of the same year she made one of her rare appearances in Chekhov, as Ranevskaya in The Cherry Orchard. Her performance divided opinion: in The Observer Ivor Brown wrote of "the glorious impact of an authentic genius at the highest level of world-theatre", but the anonymous reviewer in The Times thought that she "remains, a little mysteriously, outside of the character".

Over the next ten years Evans played in only six stage productions because she appeared in long-running West End plays. From March 1949 to November 1950 she appeared as Lady Pitts in Daphne Laureola in London and then New York. At the Haymarket she played Helen Lancaster in Waters of the Moon, which ran for more than two years. In April 1954 she played Countess Rosmarin Ostenburg in The Dark Is Light Enough, and at the Haymarket she was Mrs St Maugham in The Chalk Garden from April 1956 to November 1957. In May 1958 she returned to the Old Vic company, playing Queen Katharine in Henry VIII in London and then at the Shakespeare Memorial Theatre, Stratford-upon-Avon. At the same theatre in the 1959 season she played the Countess of Rousillon in All's Well That Ends Well, and, despite her earlier words to Shaw, Volumnia in Coriolanus. In the 1950s she made three films, The Importance of Being Earnest (1952) - in which she famously gave an exaggerated delivery of the line "A handbag?" - Look Back in Anger (1959) and The Nun's Story (1959).

=== 1960s and 1970s ===
In 1960 Evans played Judith Bliss in a television production of Noël Coward's Hay Fever. In the 1961 Stratford season Evans played Queen Margaret in Richard III and appeared for the last time as the Nurse in Romeo and Juliet. At the Queen's Theatre in November 1963, she played Violet in Gentle Jack by Robert Bolt. (Note: The title role was played by Kenneth Williams, according to whom Evans expressed reservations about his casting. He liked to mimic her characteristic swooping tones protesting, "He has such an extraordinary voice.") In 1964 in a production for the National Theatre, she returned to the role of Judith Bliss in Hay Fever, heading a cast that in Coward's words "could play the Albanian telephone directory". Her films from the first half of the 1960s were Tom Jones (1963), The Chalk Garden and Young Cassidy (both made in 1964). Her biggest film part of the 1960s was the central character, Mrs Ross, in The Whisperers (1967) for which she received an Oscar nomination and five major awards. (Note: See Edith Evans – stage and film roles#Filmography for the list of her film awards and nominations.) After that her screen appearances were in supporting roles in ten more films. When she was 87 she played the Dowager Queen in The Slipper and the Rose (1976), in which she sang and danced.

Evans's last stage roles were Mrs Forrest in The Chinese Prime Minister at the Globe (1965), the Narrator in The Black Girl in Search of God at the Mermaid (1968), and Carlotta in Dear Antoine, Chichester Festival (1971). After she found learning new roles too much, she presented an anthology of prose, poetry and music under the title Edith Evans and Friends, both in the West End and elsewhere. In this show she made her final performance on the West End stage, on 5 October 1974. Her last public appearance was a BBC radio programme With Great Pleasure, a selection of her favourite works, given before an invited audience in August 1976. In The Guardian, Nicholas de Jongh wrote of her evident frailty, "Yet she can still give the single words and phrases an imperious or serene grandeur, as in her final speaking of Richard Church's poem where she welcomed 'that summoning touch of death our neighbour'. What a glorious star is going out."

Bryan Forbes, who had directed Edith Evans in The Whisperers and The Slipper and the Rose, wrote her biography Ned's Girl, first published in 1977.

Evans died at her home in Cranbrook, Kent, on 14 October 1976, aged 88.

== Honours ==
Evans was appointed Dame Commander of the Order of the British Empire (DBE) by King George VI in 1946. She received honorary degrees from the universities of London (1950), Cambridge (1951), Oxford (1954) and Hull (1968).

Evans was painted by Walter Sickert as Katharina in Shakespeare's The Taming of the Shrew. For many years a sculpted head of Evans was on display at the Royal Court Theatre. In 1977 a portrait by Henry Glintenkamp was sold as part of her estate.

== Last resting place and memorial ==
Evans's ashes are interred at St Paul's, Covent Garden, London. A blue plaque was unveiled outside her house at 109 Ebury Street, London, in 1997.

== Awards and nominations ==
Year	Award	Category	Nominated work	Result
1949	New York Film Critics Circle Awards	Best Actress	Woman of Dolwyn/The Queen of Spades	Nominated
1960	Golden Globe Awards	Best Supporting Actress	The Nun's Story	Nominated
1960	National Board of Review	Best Supporting Actress	The Nun's Story	Won
1964	Academy Awards	Best Supporting Actress	Tom Jones	Nominated
1964	BAFTA Awards	Best British Actress	Tom Jones	Nominated
1965	Academy Awards	Best Supporting Actress	The Chalk Garden	Nominated
1965	BAFTA Awards	Best British Actress	The Chalk Garden	Nominated
1965	National Board of Review	Best Supporting Actress	The Chalk Garden	Nominated
1968	Academy Awards	Best Actress	The Whisperers	Nominated
1968	Berlin International Film Festival	Best Actress	The Whisperers	Won
1968	BAFTA Awards	Best British Actress	The Whisperers	Won
1968	Golden Globe Awards	Best Actress	The Whisperers	Won
1968	National Board of Review	Best Actress	The Whisperers	Won
1968	National Society of Film Critics Awards	Best Actress	The Whisperers	Nominated
1968	New York Film Critics Circle Awards	Best Actress	The Whisperers	Won

== See also ==
- List of actors with Academy Award nominations

== Notes and references ==
Notes

== Sources ==
- Agate, James (1925). The Contemporary Theatre, 1924. London: Chapman & Hall. OCLC 7980480.
- Agate, James; Tim Beaumont (1976). Beaumont (ed.). The Selective Ego. London: Harrap. ISBN 0245528490.
- Bennett, Arnold (1933). The Journal of Arnold Bennett. New York: Literary Guild. OCLC 363005.
- Coward, Noël (1979). Plays: Volume One: The Mid-twenties. London: Methuen. ISBN 0413460509.
- Croall, Jonathan (2011). John Gielgud – Matinee Idol to Movie Star. London: Methuen. ISBN 978-1408131060.
- Gaye, Freda, ed. (1967). Who's Who in the Theatre (fourteenth ed.). London: Sir Isaac Pitman and Sons. OCLC 5997224.
- Gibbons, Brian (2011). ""He shifteth his speech": accents and dialects in plays by Shakespeare and his contemporaries". In Christa Jansohn; Lena Cowen Orlin; Stanley Wells (eds.). Shakespeare Without Boundaries. Newark, NJ: University of Delaware Press. ISBN 978-0874130959.
- Gielgud, John; John Miller; John Powell (1979). An Actor and His Time. London: Sidgwick and Jackson. ISBN 0283985739.
- Hart-Davis, Rupert; George Lyttelton (1987) [1983 and 1984]. Lyttelton/Hart-Davis Letters Vol 5 (1960 letters) and Vol 6 (1961–62 letters). London: John Murray. ISBN 0719543819.
- Holroyd, Michael (1997). Bernard Shaw. London: Chatto and Windus. ISBN 0701162791.
- Osborne, Charles (1986). Giving It Away. London: Secker & Warburg. ISBN 0436354012.
