= Boudu Saved from Drowning =

1932 film directed by Jean Renoir

- French film poster
- Directed by: Jean Renoir
- Screenplay by: Jean Renoir
- Based on: A play by René Fauchois
- Produced by: Michel Simon
- Starring: Michel Simon; Charles Granval; Marcelle Hainia
- Cinematography: Marcel Lucien; Georges Asselin
- Edited by: Suzanne de Troeye
- Music by: Raphaël; Jean Boulze; Edouard Dumoulin
- Distributed by: Les Établissements Jacques Haïk
- Release date: 11 November 1932
- Running time: 85 minutes
- Country: France
- Language: French

Boudu Saved from Drowning (French: Boudu sauvé des eaux, "Boudu saved from the waters") is a 1932 French social satire comedy of manners film directed by Jean Renoir. Renoir wrote the film's screenplay, from the 1919 play by René Fauchois. The film stars Michel Simon as Boudu.

Pauline Kael called it, "not only a lovely fable about a bourgeois attempt to reform an early hippie... but a photographic record of an earlier France."

== Synopsis ==
Bourgeois Latin Quarter bookshop owner Edouard Lestingois rescues Boudu, a tramp, after his suicidal plunge from the Pont des Arts in Paris into the River Seine. The family adopts him and dedicates itself to reforming him into a well-mannered, middle-class person. He is shaved, given a haircut, and put in a suit. However, Boudu shows his gratitude by shaking the household to its foundations, challenging its hidebound manners, propositioning the housemaid and raping the wife.

Then he wins a large sum of money on the lottery from a ticket Lestingois gives him and is guided into marrying the housemaid. However, at the wedding, Boudu capsizes a rowboat and floats away, "back to his old vagrancy, a free spirit once more."

== Cast ==
- Michel Simon as Priape Boudu
- Charles Granval as Edouard Lestingois
- Marcelle Hainia as Emma Lestingois
- Sévérine Lerczinska as Chloe Anne Marie, la bonne
- Jean Gehret as Vigour
- Max Dalban as Godin
- Jean Dasté as L'etudiant
- Jacques Becker as Poet on park bench

== Notes ==
Renoir changed the ending of René Fauchois's play. The play ends with the marriage of Boudu and Anne-Marie, whereas in Renoir's film, Boudu escapes 'from holy padlock' and heads for ' a future of independent, vagrant liberty.' Initially angry, according to Renoir, Fauchois threatened to have his name removed from the credits, but later changed his mind, and (in Cinéma 56, no.7, November 1955) said: "I have just seen the film again and I admired it and am happy to say so. As a very free adaptation of my work, Boudu belongs to Renoir." (Fauchois's career started as an actor with the Sarah-Bernhardt company, and in 1925 when Michel Simon played Boudu on the stage Fauchois was Lestingois.) In narrative terms, another major change by Renoir from the play, consists in shifting the centre of attention from the character of Lestingois to that of Boudu.

Michel Simon was at various times, a boxer, a boxing instructor, a right-wing anarchist, a frequenter of prostitutes, pimps and petty crooks. He was extremely well read, a talented photographer, a hypochondriac, a misanthrope, owner of a vast collection of pornography and with a reputation for unorthodox sexual behaviour which he did not bother to deny. The writer Richard Boston has stated that, "Whether or not he was a pleasant man, he was certainly a complex one, with a good deal of Boudu in him," and Renoir called Simon "a genius of an actor...Boudu was conceived primarily to make use of the genius of Michel Simon."

Michel Simon called Boudu a pique-assiette, a sponger, while the writer Richard Boston rejected the idea that Boudu had much in common with the hippies of the late 1960s, as Pauline Kael had suggested. "The Oxford English Dictionary says that hippie is a hipster; a person usually exotically dressed; a beatnik. None of this sounds remotely like Boudu. Boudu doesn't reject conventional values: he never had them in the first place: you wouldn't catch him doing anything as pussy-footing as 'rejecting conventional values.' " Rather, Boston argues, Boudu is what the French call a marginal. Boudu is anarchic, chaotic, and finally, a fool. An archetype, "these agents of chaos act out our secret desires. If we see a big bum we might want to kick it: Chaplin does kick it...Laurel and Hardy, the Marx Brothers, Boudu, and Hulot are the enemies of conformity, of what can be regulated. They are the awkward squad."

== Remake ==
The film was remade for an American audience as Down and Out in Beverly Hills (1986), directed by Paul Mazursky. For another remake, Boudu (2005). Gérard Jugnot directed, from a screenplay by Philippe Lopes-Curval. It starred Gérard Depardieu as Boudu.

== See also ==
- List of films with a 100% rating on Rotten Tomatoes, a film review aggregator website
