= René Fauchois =

French dramatist

Fauchois, left, as Gioachino Rossini and Sarah Bernhardt (right) as his mother, 1920

René Fauchois (31 August 1882 – 10 February 1962) was a French dramatist, librettist and actor. Stagestruck from his youth, he moved from his native Rouen to Paris as a teenager to pursue a stage career. He had early success both as an actor and as a playwright. Among those with whom he collaborated as his career flourished were Sarah Bernhardt and Sacha Guitry. His career lasted for more than sixty years, and his output was prolific.

As a librettist Fauchois is probably best known for writing the "poème lyrique" for Fauré's Pénélope (1913). His best-known play is Prenez garde à la peinture (1932), a comedy of bourgeois avarice, adapted for US and British stage and screen as The Late Christopher Bean. His 1919 comedy Boudu sauvé des eaux has been filmed in both French and English.

== Life and career ==
Fauchois was born in Rouen to a family of modest means. He was educated at the state schools of the city, the école maternelle, école communale and école primaire supérieure. He sang in the choir of a local church, where he developed a strong interest in ritual and religion. Determined on a theatrical career he moved to Paris as a young man, enrolling as a student at the Conservatoire national de musique et de déclamation. He supported himself by selling newspapers and working as a prompter at the Théâtre de l'Œuvre.

While still a student Fauchois had his first play produced. This was Le Roi des Juifs, a verse drama in five acts, which the Théâtre de l’Œuvre staged in 1899. The following year he successfully auditioned for a small role in Edmond Rostand's play L'Aiglon, presented by and starring Sarah Bernhardt. From this beginning he made a successful career as an actor, appearing in several more productions with Bernhardt and with Mounet-Sully. He was a versatile actor, capable of playing tragic classical heroes or modern light comedy leads.

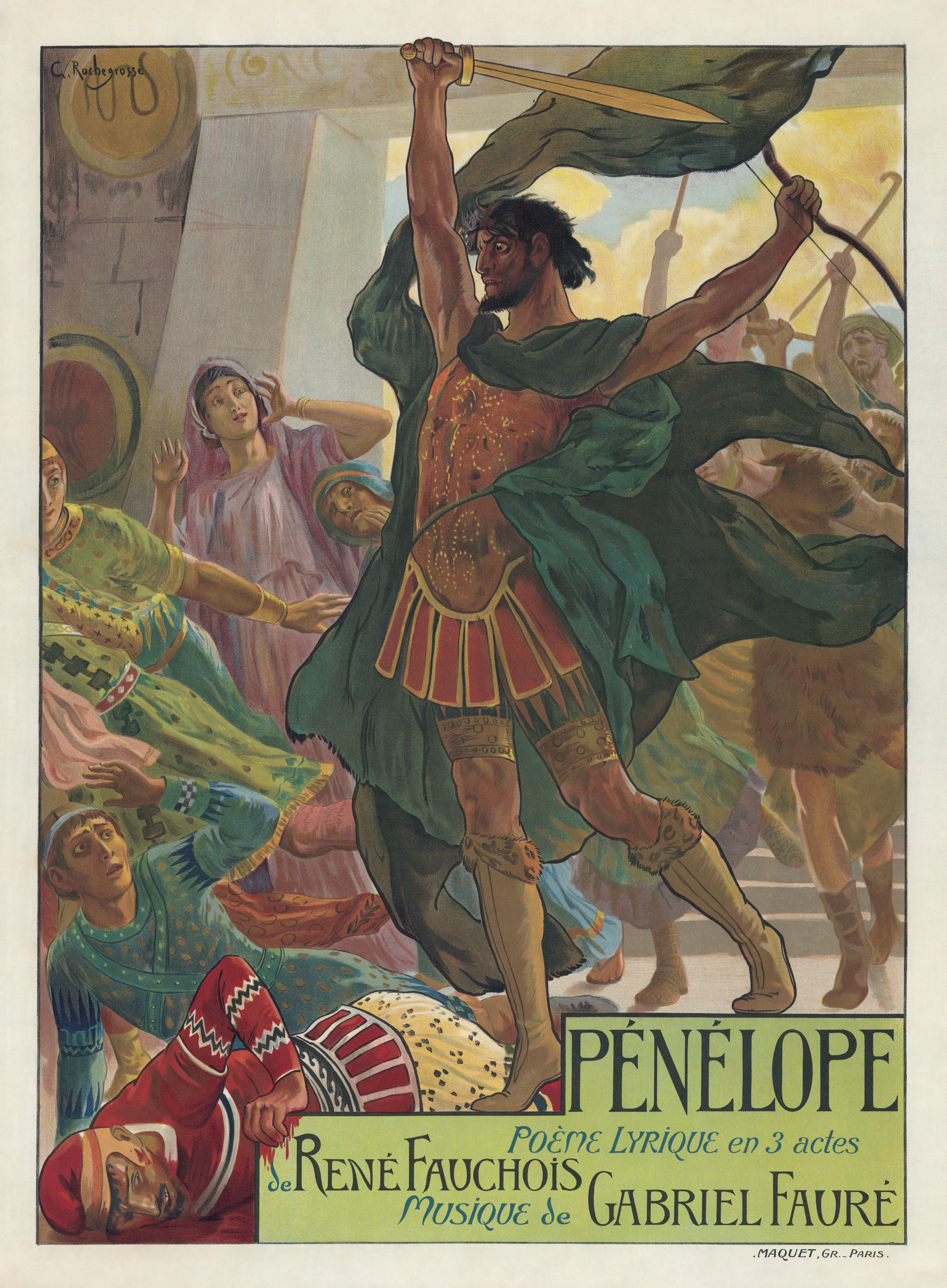
Poster for Pénélope at the Théâtre des Champs-Elysées (1913)

As a playwright Fauchois had a series of modest successes between 1902 and 1909. His first real triumph was in 1909, a three-act verse drama called Beethoven, a portrayal of the composer's life and personality. It was translated into several languages and produced in many parts of the world. A succession of plays followed, none quite such great hits as Beethoven, but successes nevertheless. A long-term project, begun in 1907 but not complete until 1913, was an opera, Pénélope, with a libretto by Fauchois and music by Gabriel Fauré. The Fauré scholar Jean-Michel Nectoux comments on aspects of the libretto that he regards as flawed, but Fauré was much impressed by "the straightforwardness of the action and by the dignity of the characters". The work was a success when presented at the Théâtre des Champs-Elysées in Paris, but its fame was short-lived: the furore of the premiere of The Rite of Spring in the same theatre less than a month later relegated the opera to the background. A few years later Fauchois wrote another libretto on a classical theme: Nausicaa, to music by Reynaldo Hahn, which was premiered in 1919.

During the First World War Fauchois wrote and acted less, although three of his plays were presented at the Comédie-Française: La Veillée des armes (1915), L'Augusta and Vitrail (1916). Resuming his career as a playwright after the war he found himself typecast as the author of grand verse dramas. He struggled to establish himself as a writer of prose comedy. His Boudu sauvé des eaux (1919), in which he played a leading role, was a succès de scandale, (Note: The play was made into a film of the same title by Jean Renoir in 1932 and was adapted again in 1986 as Down and Out in Beverly Hills.) but it was not until Sacha Guitry produced Fauchois' La Danseuse éperdue in 1922 that the writer's gift for comedy was widely recognised.

In the view of the writer Clifford Parker, Fauchois' masterpiece is Prenez garde à la peinture (1932):

He has laid the action of his play in Provence and has filled it with the atmosphere of that cheerful region. His characters are largely his own creations; typically bourgeois, they give us an intimate picture of French domestic life. Into the household of a small-town doctor come the "sharks" from Paris, lured by the bait of a dead artist's canvases, now discovered to be of tremendous value. Through various scenes we get a clear-cut view of the shady practices and tricks of the trade that go on behind the scenes in the manufacture and distribution of paintings. To reveal these practices and these tricks, through the medium of an alert, amusing, and satirical comedy, was undoubtedly the chief purpose of the author.

The play had a long run at the Théâtre des Mathurins in Paris, and was also played in the Netherlands, Germany, Sweden, Italy, the US and England. The American and English versions of the play are both called The Late Christopher Bean. The American adaptation was filmed in 1933 with Marie Dressler and Lionel Barrymore in the leading roles. The French film version (1932), which retains the original title, follows the action of the stage play more closely than the American and English adaptations.

Fauchois' career continued for nearly three decades after the success of Prenez garde à la peinture. He wrote more than twenty further stage works, and continued to act in plays and films. Among the works of his later years was a third libretto, an operatic adaptation of Madame Bovary (1951) to music by Emmanuel Bondeville. French Wikipedia has a complete list of Fauchois' plays.

Fauchois died in Paris on 10 February 1962 at the age of 79.

== Filmography ==
- The Monkey Talks, directed by Raoul Walsh (1927, based on the play Le Singe qui parle)
- Boudu Saved from Drowning, directed by Jean Renoir (France, 1932, based on the play Boudu sauvé des eaux)
- Prenez garde à la peinture, directed by Henri Chomette (France, 1933, based on the play Prenez garde à la peinture)
- Christopher Bean, directed by Sam Wood (1933, based on the play Prenez garde à la peinture)
- Dreams of Love, directed by Christian Stengel (France, 1947, based on the play Rêves d'amour)
- Down and Out in Beverly Hills, directed by Paul Mazursky (1986, based on the play Boudu sauvé des eaux)
- Boudu, directed by Gérard Jugnot (France, 2005, based on the play Boudu sauvé des eaux)

== Notes and references ==
Notes

== Sources ==
- Duchen, Jessica (2000). Gabriel Fauré. London: Phaidon. ISBN 0714839329.
- Nectoux, Jean-Michel (1991). Gabriel Fauré – A Musical Life. Roger Nichols (trans.). Cambridge: Cambridge University Press. ISBN 0521235243.
