= Arthur Ibbetson =

British cinematographer (1922-1997)

- Born: 8 September 1922; Bishop Auckland, County Durham, England
- Died: 19 October 1997 (aged 75); Hillingdon, London, England
- Occupation: Cinematographer
- Years active: 1949–1986

Arthur Ibbetson BSC (8 September 1922 in Bishop Auckland, England – 19 October 1997 in Hillingdon, Middlesex, England) was a British cinematographer.

== Biography ==
Ibbetson was born in Bishop Auckland, England in 1922, and died from cancer in Hillingdon, Middlesex, England.

Starting out as a child actor in 1935, some of his best-known projects as a cinematographer were films with or for children, including Whistle Down the Wind (1961), The Railway Children (1970) and Willy Wonka & the Chocolate Factory (1971). However, he was also the cinematographer for a number of other major films of the 1960s, including The Angry Silence (1960), The League of Gentlemen (1960), Where Eagles Dare (1968) and Anne of the Thousand Days (1969).

== Awards ==
- Nominee, Best Cinematography, British Society of Cinematographers, The Bounty (1984)
- Nominee, Best Cinematography (for a Series or Special), Emmy Award, Witness for the Prosecution (1982)
- Winner, Best Cinematography (for a Series or Special), Emmy Award, Little Lord Fauntleroy (1980)
- Nominee, Best Cinematography, Academy Award, Anne of the Thousand Days (1969)
- Nominee, Best Cinematography, BAFTA, The Chalk Garden (1964)
- Nominee, Best Cinematography, BAFTA, Nine Hours to Rama (1963)

== Selected filmography ==
- Poet's Pub (1949)
- The Horse's Mouth (1958)
- The Angry Silence (1960)
- The League of Gentlemen (1960)
- There Was a Crooked Man (1960)
- Tunes of Glory (1960)
- Whistle Down the Wind (1961)
- The Inspector (1962)
- Nine Hours to Rama (1963)
- Murder at the Gallop (1963)
- The Chalk Garden (1964)
- Fanatic (1965)
- A Countess from Hong Kong (1967)
- Inspector Clouseau (1968)
- Where Eagles Dare (1968)
- Anne of the Thousand Days (1969)
- The Railway Children (1970)
- When Eight Bells Toll (1971)
- Willy Wonka & the Chocolate Factory (1971)
- Frankenstein: The True Story (1973, TV)
- It Shouldn't Happen to a Vet (1975)
- A Little Night Music (1978)
- The Medusa Touch (1979)
- The Prisoner of Zenda (1979)
- The Bounty (1984)
- Santa Claus: The Movie (1984)
- Babes in Toyland (1986)
