= Pénélope (Fauré) =

1913 opera by Gabriel Fauré

- Opera by Gabriel Fauré
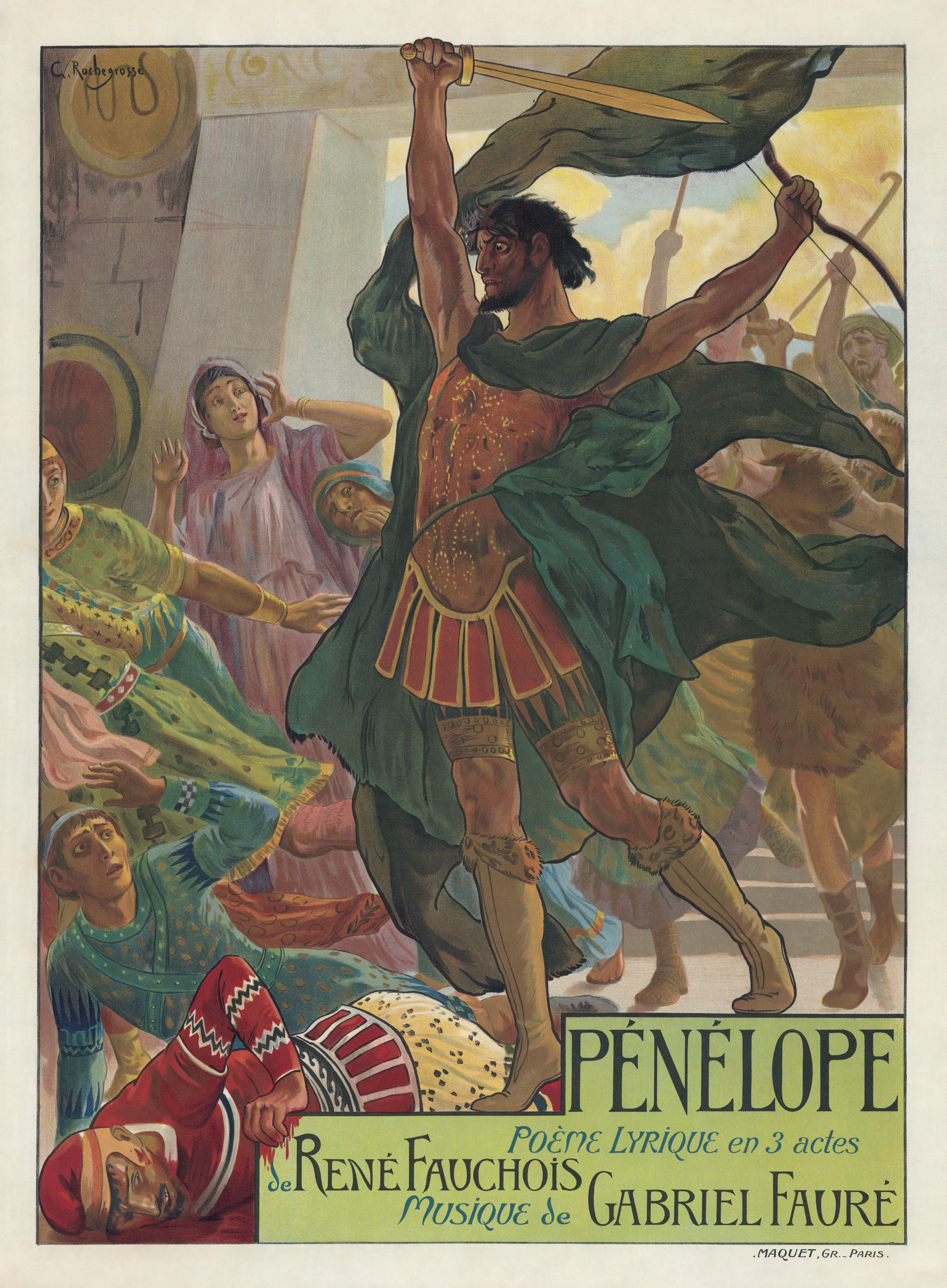
- Poster by Georges Rochegrosse used for the 1913 Théâtre des Champs-Élysées premiere
- Librettist: René Fauchois
- Language: French
- Based on: Odyssey
- Premiere: 4 March 1913; Salle Garnier, Monte Carlo

Pénélope is an opera in three acts by the French composer Gabriel Fauré. The libretto, by René Fauchois, is based on Homer's Odyssey. It was first performed at the Salle Garnier, Monte Carlo, on 4 March 1913. The piece is dedicated to Camille Saint-Saëns.

== Background and performance history ==
In 1907 the Wagnerian soprano Lucienne Bréval encountered Fauré in Monte Carlo. She expressed surprise that he had never written an opera, and introduced him to the young René Fauchois, who had recently written a play based on the section of the Odyssey dealing with Ulysses' return to Ithaca. Work on the score was slow because Fauré's teaching and administrative duties as head of the Paris Conservatoire left him only the summer holidays free for composing. For this reason he asked Fauchois to reduce the libretto from five to three acts and to cut the character of Ulysses' son Telemachus.

Fauré worked on the opera each summer between 1907 and 1912. He orchestrated most of the piece himself, in contrast with his frequent practice of delegating orchestration to one of his students. However, at the end of October 1912 he had orchestrated only half the score; with the premiere announced for the following March he recognised that with his commitments to the Conservatoire entrance examinations he needed the help of an assistant to ensure that the score was completed in time. For the sections that least interested him, (Note: Act 2 from the duet "O mon hôte, à présent", and the end of Act 3.) he recruited Fernand Pecoud, a composer and violinist in the orchestra of the Concerts Hasselmans. (Note: Fauré was not unusual in having such recourse. The Fauré scholar Jean-Michel Nectoux writes: "This was quite normal practice for the period: Saint-Saëns, superb orchestrator that he was, had allowed Messager to score an act of his opera Phryné and, as is well known, Debussy needed the help of André Caplet to meet the deadline for Le Martyre de St-Sébastien.") The opera is scored for an orchestra of full symphonic strength, with triple woodwind and a full complement of strings.

It is often stated that Fauré was one of the composers of his generation least influenced by Wagner. However, for Pénélope he adopted essential elements of Wagner's compositional technique: character and themes represented by leitmotifs, continuous music with no individual arias and requiring the two main roles to have voices of heroic quality. In Fauré's late style, "tonality is stretched hard, without breaking."

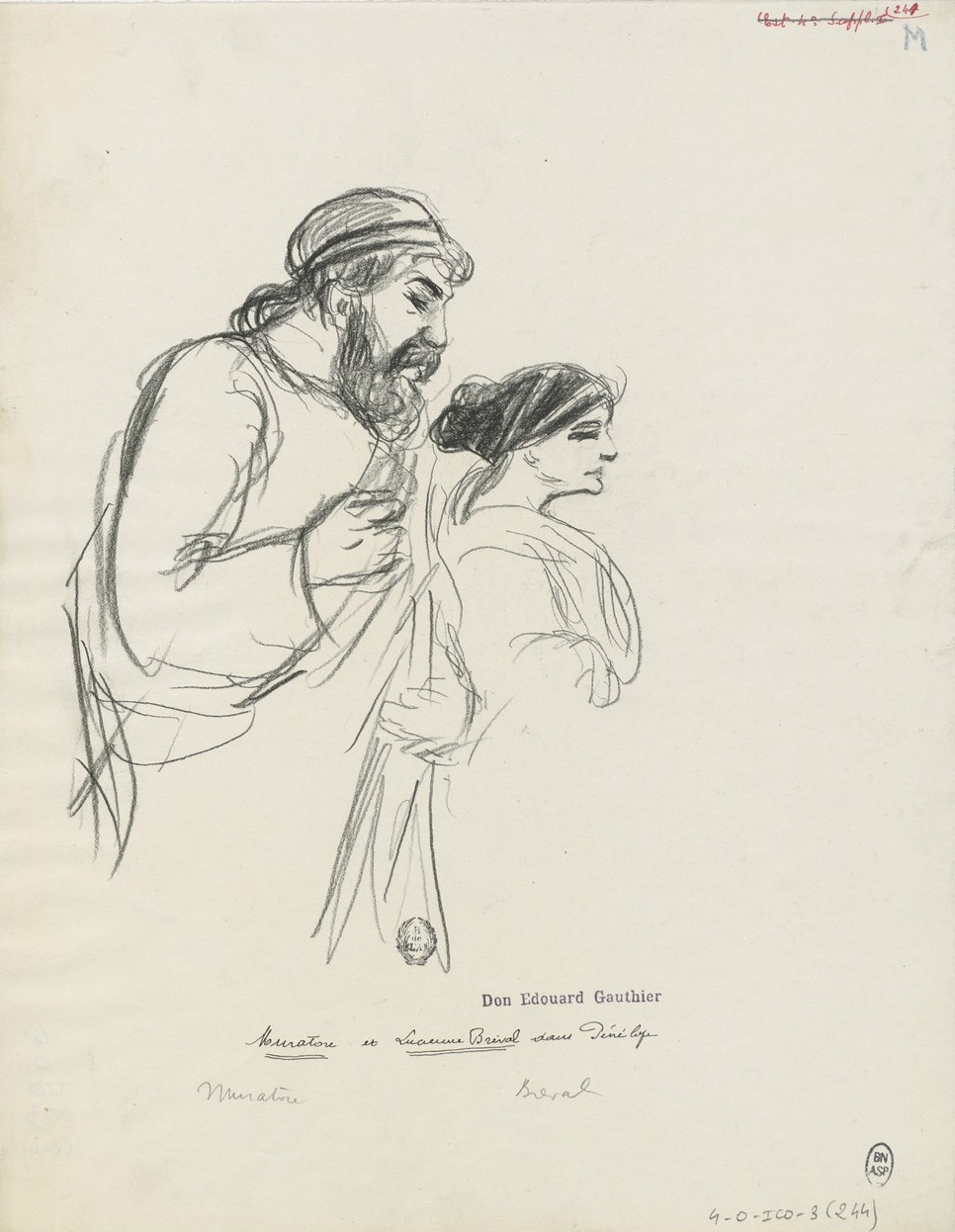
Muratore and Lucienne Bréval as Ulysse and Pénélope, Paris, 1913, drawn by Paul Charles Delaroche

The premiere at Monte Carlo was not a great success, partly because the director of the theatre, Raoul Gunsbourg, was more concerned with promoting his own opera, Vénise, which made its debut four days later. Fauré was not greatly troubled at the modest success of the piece: he regarded the Monte Carlo production as "a rehearsal for Paris", where the work was to be given two months later. Pénélope was rapturously received at the Théâtre des Champs-Elysées in Paris on 10 May 1913. Several newspapers from foreign countries thought it worthwhile sending their critics to the premiere. The New York Herald and The Daily Mail of London both praised the work highly, though Die Neue Zeitschrift für Musik was unconvinced by Fauré's music, finding it cold. Fauchois was praised for changing details of Homer's story to accommodate Fauré's delicate style. The Paris cast was headed by Bréval, with Lucien Muratore as Ulysse, Cécile Thévenet as Euryclée and Paul Blancard as Eumée. Muratore in particular was considered a great improvement on his Monte Carlo counterpart.

The piece was only very briefly the principal topic of discussion in Parisian musical circles: less than three weeks after the premiere of the opera the Théâtre des Champs-Elysées was the venue for the first performance of The Rite of Spring. The scandal at and after the ballet's premiere preoccupied the French press, and Fauré's opera was hardly mentioned. A second blow to the fame of Pénélope was the financial collapse and near bankruptcy of the theatre six months after the premiere. The sets and costumes had to be sold.

The Opéra-Comique took Pénélope into its repertoire on 20 January 1919, with a cast including Germaine Lubin in the title role and Charles Rousselière as Ulysse and Félix Vieuille as Eumée, conducted by François Ruhlmann. Later revivals were conducted by Albert Wolff (1922), Désiré-Émile Inghelbrecht (1924, with Claire Croiza in the title role), and Wolff again in 1927 and 1931, totalling 63 performances. On 14 March 1943 the Paris Opera staged Pénélope, conducted by Ruhlmann, with Lubin in the title role.

The US premiere was in 1945, in Cambridge, Massachusetts. The Teatro Colón in Buenos Aires staged Pénélope in 1962, with Regine Crespin in the title role and Guy Chauvet as Ulysse, conducted by Jean Fournet.The UK premiere was a student production at the Royal Academy of Music in 1970. The opera was staged at the Wexford Festival in 2005, conducted by Jean-Luc Tingaud, with Nora Sourouzian in the title role and Gerard Powers as Ulysse.

== Roles ==
Lucien Muratore as Ulysse in 1913

Role	Voice type	Premiere cast, 4 March 1913 Conductor: Léon Jehin
Pénélope (Penelope)	soprano	Lucienne Bréval
Ulysse (Ulysses)	tenor	Charles Rousselière
Eumée (Eumaeus)	baritone	Jean Bourbon
Euryclée (Euryclea)	mezzo-soprano	Alice Raveau
Antinoüs	tenor	Charles Delmas
Alkandre	mezzo-soprano	Criticos
Mélantho	soprano	Cécile Malraison
Phylo	mezzo-soprano	Gabrielle Gilson
Ctésippe	tenor	Robert Couzinou
Pisandre	tenor	Bindo Gasparini
Eurymache	baritone	André Allard
Cléone	mezzo-soprano	Durand-Servière
Leodès	tenor	Sorret
Lydie	soprano	Florentz
Une suivante (a follower)	soprano	Nelly Courcelle

== Synopsis ==
=== Act One ===
Penelope has been waiting for ten years for the return of her husband, Ulysses, King of Ithaca. In the meantime she has been besieged by suitors for her hand in marriage. She promises she will choose between them once she has finishing weaving a shroud for her father-in-law, Laertes, but every night she unpicks the day's work. Ulysses arrives at the palace disguised as a beggar and is recognised by his old nurse Euryclea.

=== Act Two ===
That night, as ever, Penelope keeps watch for Ulysses' ship on a hill-top overlooking the sea. She talks nostalgically to the shepherd Eumaeus. The beggar offers to help Penelope defeat the suitors. He claims to be a fugitive Cretan king who has seen Ulysses alive at his court. After Penelope leaves, Ulysses reveals his true identity to the overjoyed shepherds.

=== Act Three ===
The suitors have arranged Penelope's wedding in the palace hall. She tells them that they must decide which one will win her hand by holding a competition to see who can draw Ulysses' bow. Not one of them succeeds. The beggar steps forward and draws the bow with ease, before turning to shoot the suitors. The shepherds join in the killing with their knives. Finally, Ulysses and Penelope are happily reunited.

== Recordings ==
- Pénélope: Régine Crespin, Raoul Jobin, Robert Massard, Christiane Gayraud, Choir and Orchestra of RTF, conducted by Désiré-Émile Inghelbrecht (live recording from 1956, GOP, 2007)
- Pénélope: Jessye Norman, Alain Vanzo, José van Dam, Michèle Command, Ensemble Vocal Jean Laforge, Orchestre Philharmonique de Monte Carlo, conducted by Charles Dutoit (Erato, 1982)

== Notes and references ==
Notes

== Sources ==
- Duchen, Jessica (2000). Gabriel Fauré. London: Phaidon. ISBN 0714839329.
- Jones, J Barrie (1989). Gabriel Fauré – A Life in Letters. London: B T Batsford. ISBN 0713454687.
- Murray, David (1997). "Fauré, Gabriel". In Amanda Holden (ed.). The Penguin Opera Guide. London: Penguin Books. ISBN 014051385X.
- Nectoux, Jean-Michel (1991). Gabriel Fauré – A Musical Life. Roger Nichols (trans.). Cambridge: Cambridge University Press. ISBN 0521235243.
- Orledge, Robert (1979). Gabriel Fauré. London: Eulenburg Books. ISBN 0903873400.
- Phillips, Edward R (2011). Gabriel Fauré: A Guide to Research (second ed.). London: Routledge. ISBN 978-0415998857.
- Wolff, Stéphane (1953). Un demi-siècle d'Opéra-Comique 1900–1950. Paris: André Bonne. OCLC 2174128.
