= Down and Out in Beverly Hills =

1986 film by Paul Mazursky

- Theatrical release poster
- Directed by: Paul Mazursky
- Screenplay by: Paul Mazursky; Leon Capetanos
- Based on: Boudu sauvé des eaux by René Fauchois
- Produced by: Paul Mazursky
- Starring: Nick Nolte; Bette Midler; Richard Dreyfuss
- Cinematography: Donald McAlpine
- Edited by: Richard Halsey
- Music by: Andy Summers
- Production companies: Touchstone Films; Silver Screen Partners II
- Distributed by: Buena Vista Distribution Co.
- Release date: January 31, 1986
- Running time: 103 minutes
- Country: United States
- Language: English
- Budget: $14 million
- Box office: $62.1 million

Down and Out in Beverly Hills is a 1986 American comedy film co-written and directed by Paul Mazursky, based on the 1919 French play Boudu sauvé des eaux, which was later adapted into the 1932 film Boudu sauvé des eaux by Jean Renoir. The film stars Nick Nolte, Bette Midler, and Richard Dreyfuss. The plot follows a rich but dysfunctional family who save the life of a suicidal homeless man. Musician Little Richard appears as a neighbor, and performs "Great Gosh A'Mighty" during a party scene.

Produced by Touchstone Films, a film label of The Walt Disney Studios, Down and Out in Beverly Hills has the distinction of being the first film produced by a Disney-owned studio receive an R rating by the MPAA. The film was Dreyfuss' first substantial success after his much publicized drug problems and helped to reignite his career.

== Plot ==
Dave Whiteman and his wife, Barbara, are a nouveau-riche couple in Beverly Hills whose 20-year marriage has become stale and sexless. Dave is the owner of Dav-Bar, a manufacturing business that makes wire garment hangers. He is having an affair with Carmen, the live-in maid, while Barbara tries to relieve her constant feelings of anxiety through shopping and experimenting with various New Age therapies. She admits to having hired Carmen partly to satisfy Dave's lust. Their teenage son, Max, has a strained relationship with his parents, communicates with them largely through his avant-garde videos, and is having issues around his gender presentation. Dave feels estranged from his 19-year-old daughter Jenny, who he believes is anorexic and making poor life choices. The family dog, Matisse, is also poorly adjusted.

Jerry Baskin, a down-and-out homeless man, attempts to drown himself in the Whitemans' pool, driven to despair by the loss of his own dog. Dave saves him and offers to let him to recuperate at their home for a few days. He is intrigued by Jerry's colorful accounts of his past life and former success and wealth, and offers to help him get back on his feet. As they spend time together, meeting Jerry's friends, Dave finds liberation in observing Jerry's lifestyle and outlook, which contrasts his own materialistic conformism. Meanwhile, Jerry overcomes Barbara's hostility and begins a sexual relationship with her. This reawakens her sex drive, and she and Dave re-consummate their marriage.

Jerry soon also has sex with Carmen, who now rejects Dave's advances as exploitative, thanks to the political literature Jerry introduced her to. He also cures Matisse of its behavioral problems through his empathetic skills, and he persuades Max to come out to his parents in his androgynous persona. Finally, he seduces Jenny, just as she vehemently denounces him as a manipulative psychopath. At an extravagant party thrown by the Whitemans, Jenny tells Dave she has overcome her apparent anorexia and declares herself deeply in love with Jerry. This development impels Dave to physically attack Jerry, and the two, along with several guests, end up floundering in the swimming pool.

The following morning, Jerry ruefully confesses to inventing the stories he had told of his past and prepares to leave the Whiteman house. Wandering down the back service alley with Matisse (now his firmly bonded companion), Jerry turns to see the entire household gathering in the alley, gazing after him longingly. He silently turns back to rejoin them, and they re-enter the grounds of the house together.

== Cast ==
- Nick Nolte as Jerry Baskin
- Bette Midler as Barbara Whiteman
- Richard Dreyfuss as Dave Whiteman
- Little Richard as Orvis Goodnight
- Tracy Nelson as Jenny Whiteman
- Elizabeth Peña as Carmen
- Evan Richards as Max Whiteman
- Felton Perry as Al
- Eloy Casados as Tom "Tom-Tom"
- Michael Yama as Nagamichi
- Dorothy Tristan as Dorothy
- Toni Grant as herself
- Alexis Arquette as Alexis (uncredited)
- Mike the Dog as Matisse

== Reception ==
=== Box office ===
The film opened on 806 screens and was number one at the US box office, with an opening weekend gross of $5,726,495. It added 10 more theatres and grossed 7% more in its second weekend, remaining at number one. It grossed $62,000,000 in the United States and Canada on a budget of $14,000,000.

=== Critical response ===
On the review aggregator website Rotten Tomatoes, the film holds an approval rating of 77% based on 31 reviews, with an average rating of 6.9/10. The website's critics consensus reads, "An enjoyable farce that relocates Jean Renoir's Boudu Saved From Drowning to '80s California, offering fine comedic performances from Nick Nolte, Richard Dreyfuss and Bette Midler." Metacritic, which uses a weighted average, assigned the film a score of 72 out of 100, based on 16 critics, indicating "universal acclaim". Audiences polled by CinemaScore gave the film an average grade of "B" on an A+ to F scale.

Janet Maslin of The New York Times quipped, "No film of Mr. Mazursky's is without its occasional sentimental excess, and this one even has its silly side; certainly Mr. Mazursky, who wrote the film with Leon Capetanos, knows better than to throw everyone into the pool at the end of a party scene. But as a comedy of manners it has a dependably keen aim, with its most wicked barbs leavened by Mr. Mazursky's obvious fondness for his characters." Roger Ebert of the Chicago Sun-Times gave the film four out of four stars and concluded, "Mazursky has a way of making comedies that are more intelligent and relevant than most of the serious films around; his last credit, for example, was the challenging Moscow on the Hudson. So let me just say that Down and Out in Beverly Hills made me laugh longer and louder than any film I've seen in a long time." Sheila Benson's review in the Los Angeles Times called it "depth-charge comedy"; however, she had reservations on the outcome of Nick Nolte's character.

== Television series ==
In April 1987, a series based on the film aired on the newly formed Fox Broadcasting Company. Evan Richards (Max) was the only actor to star in both the film and show. It aired eight episodes before cancelation, being one of two shows (the other being Karen's Song) that were canceled by the start of the 1987–88 television season by Fox.

== Soundtrack ==
Down and Out in Beverly Hills

Soundtrack album by Various Artists
- Released: 1986
- Recorded: 1986
- Genre: Soundtrack
- Length: 30:35

1. "Great Gosh A'Mighty!" – Little Richard
2. "California Girls" – David Lee Roth
3. "El Tecaliteco" – Mariachi Vargas de Tecalitlan
4. "I Love L.A." – Randy Newman
5. "Tutti Frutti" – Little Richard
6. "Down and Out in Beverly Hills Theme" – Andy Summers
7. "Search for Kerouac" – Andy Summers
8. "Nouvelle Cuisine" – Andy Summers
9. "Wave Hands Like Clouds" – Andy Summers
10. "The Mission Blues" – Andy Summers
11. "Jerry's Suicide Attempt" – Andy Summers

While the soundtrack omits the song, the opening and closing credits feature a remix of "Once in a Lifetime" from the 1984 Talking Heads concert film Stop Making Sense.
