= Marcelle Hainia =

French actress (1896–1968)

- Born: 13 November 1896; Paris, France
- Died: 9 August 1968 (aged 71); Paris, France
- Other name: Marcelle Pontagnier
- Occupation: Actress
- Years active: 1932-1968 (film)

Marcelle Hainia (1896–1968) was a French stage and film actress.

== Filmography ==
| Year | Title | Role | Notes |
|---|---|---|---|
| 1932 | Boudu Saved from Drowning | Emma Lestingois | |
| 1938 | The Little Thing | Madame Fougeroux | |
| 1943 | It Happened at the Inn | Goupi-Cancan | |
| 1944 | Night Shift | Madame Sandoz | |
| 1945 | Paris Frills | | Uncredited |
| 1945 | Le père Serge | | |
| 1946 | Gringalet | Madame Blanchard | |
| 1946 | Martin Roumagnac | Madame Percheron, la pompiste | |
| 1947 | Torrents | Tante Coralie | |
| 1947 | Antoine and Antoinette | Une invitée au marriage | Uncredited |
| 1950 | Justice Is Done | Angèle Popélier - l'autre l'hôtelière | |
| 1950 | Mademoiselle Josette, My Woman | Madame Dutilleul | |
| 1952 | Love, Madame | Madame Broussard | |
| 1952 | La demoiselle et son revenant | La grand-mère | |
| 1953 | Les Révoltés de Lomanach | Une douairière | |
| 1954 | Cadet Rousselle | La dame en diligence | |
| 1955 | Rififi | Fredo's Wife | |
| 1955 | School for Love | L'habilleuse | |
| 1956 | Le Salaire du péché | | Uncredited |
| 1957 | Les Collégiennes | | |

== Bibliography ==
- Nicholas Macdonald. In Search of La Grande Illusion: A Critical Appreciation of Jean Renoir's Elusive Masterpiece. McFarland, 2013.
