= The Adventures of the Black Girl in Her Search for God =

1932 short-story collection by Bernard Shaw

The Adventures of the Black Girl in Her Search for God (and Some Lesser Tales)
- Original cover design
- Author: George Bernard Shaw
- Illustrator: John Farleigh
- Publisher: Constable and Company
- Publication date: 1932

The Adventures of the Black Girl in Her Search for God (and Some Lesser Tales) is a book of short stories written by George Bernard Shaw, published in London by Constable and Company in 1932. The title story is a satirical allegory relating the experiences of an African black girl, freshly converted to Christianity, who takes literally the biblical injunction to "Seek and you shall find me" and attempts to seek out and actually speak to God.

== Synopsis ==
After she becomes dissatisfied with the inconsistencies of the answers the missionary who has converted her gives to her questions, an African girl leaves to wander in the forest, searching for God. One by one, she actually meets several versions of "God", from the vengeful deity of the early books of the Bible to the philosophical version of the Book of Job. She also meets two versions of Jesus, a kindly but ineffective young man and another who makes a living by posing for an artist depicting him on a cross. Muhammad, and the Muslim view of God, fare no better.

She then meets an atheist behaviourist (with a strong resemblance to Ivan Pavlov) and a coterie of intellectuals who explain that speculations about God are passé, and that a better quest lies in abstract mathematics. She disposes of them all, first and last, by trenchant logic and the occasional skilled use of her knobkerry (wooden club).

Eventually she meets an old gentleman who (like Voltaire) persuades her to seek God by working in a garden. He eventually persuades her to abandon her quest, settle down with a "coarse" red-headed Irishman and rear a "charmingly coffee-coloured" family. Only after the children are grown and gone does she resume her searching, and by then her "strengthened mental powers take her far beyond the stage at which there is fun in smashing idols".

== Satire ==
The Black Girl, as protagonist, serves the same purpose as Christian in John Bunyan's The Pilgrim's Progress; that is to say her own "inner", or "spiritual" life is represented as a series of physical events and encounters. The over-all tone of the argument is agnostic: through all the rejection of false gods there remains an implied conviction that there is a true god to find: at the end of the work the girl, now an old woman, resumes her search rather than finally abandoning it.

Her intellectual powers and red-blooded humanity are contrasted with the "white" characters—especially the insipid missionary woman who "converted" her in the first place, and her thoroughly non-intellectual husband. This use of a superior person supposed by popular prejudice to be inferior, both by her sex and her race, is paralleled by the character of "The Negress"—a powerful figure in The Thing Happens, which is the third part of Shaw's Back to Methuselah.

== Publishing history ==
The book was first published in 1932, as Short Stories, Scraps and Shavings. In December 1932 Constable and Company published an edition engraved and designed by John Farleigh with the title The Adventures of the Black Girl in her Search for God.

A 1934 reprinting including Black Girl, already serialized in 1932, along with a companion essay that disclaimed the supernatural origin of the Bible. In the essay, Shaw declares the Bible to be a book without divine authority—but still important for its ethical messages and valuable as history.

== Reaction ==
Both the story and the essay outraged the religious public, creating a demand that supported five reprintings. Shaw was greatly distressed when the perceived "irreligious" tone of Black Girl caused a rift in his long-term friendship with Dame Laurentia McLachlan, Abbess of Stanbrook; although eventually they reconciled. Shaw exacerbated the general furore by proposing intermarriage of blacks and whites as a solution to racial problems in South Africa. This was taken as a bad joke in Britain and as blasphemy in Nazi Germany. The full text of this story is available on-line.

Several books used variations on the title as satirical or serious replies to Shaw. A lighthearted riposte appeared in a similarly presented volume, The Adventures of the White Girl in her Search for God by Charles Herbert Maxwell, which showed a modern young woman wielding a niblick (golf club) on the cover. This book advanced different views of what is really taught by Christianity, defending orthodox Christian doctrine, and deflected the racial construct presented by Shaw. The story involves the modern white girl meeting Shaw and the black girl. She follows Shaw to meet H. G. Wells, Aldous Huxley and other authors, discussing their various views of God. Every so often she hits Shaw with her niblick.

Another response, the Adventures of the Brown Girl (companion to the Black girl of Mr. Bernard Shaw) in her Search for God by I. I. and Elsa Kazi was published in 1933 by A. H. Stockwell. This was a liberal Muslim reply which argued that the monotheistic view of the divine existed throughout history, and thus that "every prophet preached Islam in its theistic aspects". Other titles include W. R. Matthews' The Adventures of Gabriel in his Search for Mr. Shaw (1933) and The Adventures of the White Girl in her Search for Knowledge (1934) by Marcus Hayman. In Matthews' book God sends the Archangel Gabriel to seek out the real Shaw, discovering four "sham" Shaws (his public personas) that hide the real individual. Hayman's book was a left-wing criticism of Shaw's religious ideology. In 1973 Brigid Brophy published The Adventures of God in his Search for the Black Girl, in which Shaw himself appears.

In 1968 the story was adapted into a play, which was first produced at the Mermaid Theatre under the direction of Basil Ashmore. Passages from the story were read out by a narrator (Edith Evans) and the Black Girl was played by Mona Hammond. Hammond later said that she had to push to get the part, as the casting director objected that she was not sufficiently black to play the character.

Mabel Dove's satirical response, entitled The Adventures of the Black Girl in her Search for Mr Shaw (1933), was included in the British Library's 2015–16 exhibition West Africa: Word, Symbol, Song.
