= The Dark Is Light Enough =

1954 verse play by Christopher Fry

Cover first edition, Oxford University Press, 1954 (illustration: Ronald Searle)

The Dark Is Light Enough is a 1954 verse play by Christopher Fry, which he wrote for Dame Edith Evans and set during the Hungarian Revolution of 1848. It is formally a comedy, but Fry subtitled the play 'A Winter Comedy' to signal its tragic qualities.

The play, directed by Peter Brook, premiered at the Aldwych Theatre in London in May 1954.

== Original London cast ==
- Jakob – John Moffatt
- Bellmann – Hugh Griffith
- Kassel (Doctor) – Peter Bull
- Stefan (Son of the Countess) – Peter Barkworth
- Bella – Violet Farebrother
- Willi – David Spencer
- Gelda (Daughter of the Countess) – Margaret Johnston
- Richard Gettner – James Donald
- Countess Rosmarin Ostenburg – Edith Evans
- Colonel Janik – John Glen
- Count Peter Zichy – Jack Gwillim
- Beppy – George Murcell
- Rusti – Patrick Halliday
- 1st Soldier – Peter Sallis
- 2nd Soldier – Frederick Treves
- 3rd Soldier – Churton Fairman

Source: The Stage.

== Original Broadway cast ==
The extended preview season started on Broadway at the ANTA Playhouse on 23 February 1955 and closed on 23 April 1955, after a total of 69 performances. It was directed by Guthrie McClintic.

- Countess Rosmarin Ostenburg – Katharine Cornell
- Richard Gettner – Tyrone Power
- Gelda (Daughter of the Countess) – Marian Winters
- Colonel Janik – Arnold Moss
- Count Peter Zichy – Christopher Plummer
- Stefan (Son of the Countess) – Paul Roebling
- Kassel (Doctor) – William Podmore
- Bella – Eva Condon
- Belmann – John Williams
- Fourth Soldier – Dario Barri
- Third Soldier – Jerome Gardino
- Beppy – Ted Gunther
- Jakob – Donald Harron
- Willi – Charles Macaulay
- Rusti, A Hungarian corporal – Sydney Pollack

== Adaptations ==
A 90-minute BBC TV version was broadcast in January 1958, starring Edith Evans as the Countess and Peter Wyngarde as Richard Gettner. It was directed by Stuart Burge.
