= The Whisperers =

1967 British film by Bryan Forbes

- Film Poster
- Directed by: Bryan Forbes
- Written by: Robert Nicolson; Bryan Forbes
- Based on: The Whisperers by Robert Nicholson
- Produced by: Michael Laughlin; Jack Rix; Ronald Shedlo
- Starring: Edith Evans; Eric Portman; Nanette Newman; Ronald Fraser; Avis Bunnage; Gerald Sim
- Cinematography: Gerry Turpin
- Edited by: Anthony Harvey
- Music by: John Barry
- Color process: Black and white
- Production companies: Seven Pines; Lopert Pictures Corporation
- Distributed by: United Artists
- Release date: 24 August 1967
- Running time: 106 minutes
- Country: United Kingdom
- Language: English
- Budget: $400,000

The Whisperers is a 1967 British drama film directed by Bryan Forbes and starring Edith Evans. It is based on the 1961 novel by Robert Nicolson.

== Plot ==
Mrs Margaret Ross, an impoverished, eccentric 76-year-old woman, is living in a ground floor flat in an unnamed town in northern England. She is dependent on National Assistance from the British government. She hears voices, the whisperers of the title, of whom she asks "Are you there?".

She is visited by her criminal son, who hides a package containing a large sum of money in her spare room. The son confesses to the police of his robbery, and is sent to jail. Meanwhile, Mrs Ross finds the money. Thinking the money is a windfall intended for her, she makes elaborate plans. She casually confides to a stranger, who befriends her in order to ply her with spirits, kidnap her, then rob her of the stolen money. Rendered drunk and abandoned to the elements by her captors, Mrs Ross contracts pneumonia.

She is found by neighbours, then after almost dying, recovers in a hospital. It is the first time anyone has cared for her in years. Doctors, nurses, psychiatrists, and social workers all focus on her case. An agent at the National Assistance bureau traces down her husband, Archie (who deserted her decades ago). Motivated by the agent, who threatens him with legal pressure, informing him of his legal responsibility to her, the husband is strongly encouraged to move back in with her, which he does. Soon, Archie becomes involved with gamblers, then steals their money at a chance opportunity, which forces him to flee, so he deserts her again.

Having been on the verge of a return to functional living, Mrs Ross resumes her life living by herself. Her voices had gone away, but when she returns she asks the whisperers again if they are there.

The movie depicts these events as occurring in 1966, the year that British National Assistance was replaced by Supplementary Benefit.

== Cast ==
- Edith Evans as Mrs Ross
- Eric Portman as Archie Ross
- Nanette Newman as girl upstairs
- Harry Baird as man upstairs
- Jack Austin as Police Sergeant
- Gerald Sim as Mr Conrad
- Lionel Gamlin as Mr Conrad's colleague
- Glen Farmer as 1st redeemer
- Oliver MacGreevy as 2nd redeemer
- Ronald Fraser as Charlie Ross
- Kenneth Griffith as Mr Weaver
- Avis Bunnage as Mrs Noonan
- John Orchard as Grogan
- Peter Thompson as Publican
- Sarah Forbes as Mrs Ross when young
- Kaplan Kaye as Jimmie Noonan
- Penny Spencer as Mavis Noonan
- Robin Bailey as psychiatrist
- Leonard Rossiter as Assistance Board officer
- Margaret Tyzack as Hospital Almoner
- Frank Singuineau as doctor
- Michael Robbins as Mr Noonan

== Production ==
Forbes was approached by two American producers, Ronald Shedlo and Michael Laughlin, to adapt the novel. He felt it could be a vehicle for Edith Evans. Forbes wrote the script in two weeks. He said it was the one film in his career where he had complete creative control.

=== Filming location ===
Although the fictional setting of the film is not named, it was mainly shot on location in the Lancashire town of Oldham (now in Greater Manchester), a once-thriving textile centre near Manchester which, by 1967, had fallen into decline.

== Release ==
=== Awards ===
Edith Evans was nominated for the Academy Award for Best Actress and the National Society of Film Critics Award for Best Actress, and won the BAFTA Award, the Silver Bear for Best Actress award at the 17th Berlin International Film Festival, the National Board of Review Award, the New York Film Critics Circle Award, and the Golden Globe Award, all for Best Actress.

=== Home media ===
In March 2019, distributor Kino Lorber announced that a new 2K scan of The Whisperers would soon be arriving on Blu-ray. The disc was released in January 2020.
