= The Chalk Garden (film) =

1964 film by Ronald Neame

- Theatrical release poster
- Directed by: Ronald Neame
- Screenplay by: John Michael Hayes
- Based on: The Chalk Garden play by Enid Bagnold
- Produced by: Ross Hunter
- Starring: Deborah Kerr; Hayley Mills
- Cinematography: Arthur Ibbetson
- Edited by: Jack Harris
- Music by: Malcolm Arnold
- Production companies: Ross Hunter Productions; Quota Rentals Limited; Universal Pictures
- Distributed by: Universal Pictures (United States); Rank Film Distributors (United Kingdom)
- Release date: 21 May 1964
- Running time: 106 minutes
- Countries: United Kingdom; United States
- Language: English
- Box office: $3.25 million (US/ Canada rentals)

The Chalk Garden is a 1964 British-American drama film directed by Ronald Neame. It stars Deborah Kerr and Hayley Mills and is an adaptation of the 1955 play of the same name by Enid Bagnold. Set in a secluded country house in East Sussex, the story revolves around an elderly woman hiring Miss Madrigal, a governess with a mysterious past, to look after her disturbed and spoiled teenage granddaughter Laurel. The film received generally positive reviews from critics.

== Plot ==
Miss Madrigal, an attractive thirtyish woman, applies for the position of governess to Laurel, the granddaughter of Mrs. St. Maugham. A disturbed, overindulged 16-year-old, Laurel has driven away many governesses and six prior applicants. As Miss Madrigal and another applicant await interviews, Laurel claims a previous governess was eaten by sharks and expresses her compulsion to burn down the house. The other applicant flees, but Miss Madrigal remains unflustered. Maitland, an insolent butler, advises her to emphasize her oddity: "Mrs. St. Maugham cherishes the unusual." Miss Madrigal produces no references, but Mrs. St. Maugham hires her anyway when she shows gardening knowledge.

Laurel threatens Miss Madrigal with blackmail, even if she has to invent something. After claiming Maitland killed his wife and child, Miss Madrigal confronts Laurel about her constant lies. Laurel responds by claiming she was in the room when her father shot himself. Maitland explains that Laurel's lies are "dramatized truth". Laurel's father died of alcoholism while Maitland was driving the car in the crash that killed his wife and daughter.

Laurel searches Miss Madrigal's bedroom and finds all her clothes are new, her painting kit has the initials "CDW", and she possesses no family pictures. Laurel shares her suspicions with Maitland, and when Miss Madrigal joins them, Laurel and Maitland discuss their interest in true crime stories. Miss Madrigal dismisses them, commenting that "truth doesn't always ring true in a court of law. What the prisoner listens to is not his life. It's the shape and shadow of his life with the accidents of truth taken out of it." She discloses that she once attended a trial.

Laurel intensely resents her mother, Olivia, who left the family for her current husband. When Olivia comes to take custody of Laurel, Mrs. St. Maugham refuses and Olivia promises to return with the necessary legal papers. Mrs. St. Maugham discusses legal options with her old friend, Judge McWhirrey over lunch. Miss Madrigal is unnerved at the sight of the judge, spilling a glass of wine and acting oddly. Maitland lingers over serving lunch and Laurel questions the judge about his murder cases. Miss Madrigal admits she heard him give a verdict with which she did not agree. Laurel prompts him to describe the case of 15-year-old Constance Doris Wakeland, whose death sentence for killing her stepsister was commuted to prison time. When he quotes the words of the accused - "What I have been listening to is not my life, but the shape and shadow of my life with the accidents of truth taken out of it" - Miss Madrigal rushes out of the room in tears. Laurel expresses remorse for her behaviour to Maitland.

Maitland expresses his admiration for Miss Madrigal and convinces her to stay. She tells Maitland she fears Laurel is following the same path that led to her being accused of murder, with no one believing the truth. Maitland convinces her to speak to Judge McWhirrey. He hadn't recognized her, but suggests she appeal directly to Mrs. St. Maugham. For Laurel's sake, Miss Madrigal reveals her identity to the grandmother and pleads for Laurel to go back to her mother. Laurel recognizes Miss Madrigal's self-sacrifice and agrees to go back to her mother.

Mrs. St. Maugham convinces Miss Madrigal to stay on as her companion, then asks her if she truly killed her stepsister. With Maitland looking on approvingly, Miss Madrigal asks why she should know what the judge and jury were unable to determine. Mrs. St. Maugham vows that before she dies, she will find out the truth.

== Cast ==
- Deborah Kerr as Miss Madrigal
- Hayley Mills as Laurel
- John Mills as Maitland
- Edith Evans as Mrs St. Maugham
- Felix Aylmer as Judge McWhirrey
- Elizabeth Sellars as Olivia

== Production ==
Don Hartman acquired the story for Paramount Pictures and took it over when he left Paramount in 1956 to become an independent producer. Shortly before Hartman died in 1958, Paramount halted pre-production. In 1960, producer Ross Hunter said that he had the rights to the play, having "forced the studio to buy it." He worked with a writer to make the script "more commercial."

The film was announced in May 1962 and Joanne Woodward was slated to star with Sandra Dee. Hunter wanted Ingrid Bergman for the film and had originally sought Gladys Cooper for the role of Mrs. St. Maugham in place of Edith Evans. Sandra Dee pulled out of the film when she fell pregnant and was replaced by Hayley Mills. Neame says "Except for my disappointment with the clean, white, sterile decor, the shooting period itself was most enjoyable." He left the film after handing in his cut, and was unhappy at the use of music, which he thought was overused. However he said "In all honesty, even if I’d remained on the picture, I very much doubt anything could be achieved other than what Ross wanted. He was Universal’s most successful producer and the studio would naturally back his decisions— he was where the money was."

== Reception ==
=== Critical reception ===
In a contemporary review for The New York Times, critic Bosley Crowther wrote: "A great deal of scrupulous cultivation and orderly shaping of the plot have been done ... Ronald Neame, who has directed the picture, and John Michael Hayes, who has written the script, present us with a cozy, compact drama that follows a comfortable, sentimental line. ... There are moments, however, when the sharpness of Miss Bagnold's oblique slant on life cuts through, usually in glints of hidden mischief or in lines of slashing paradox and wit. When these come, the film sparkles briefly beyond the brightness of its Technicolored hues."

On the review aggregator website Rotten Tomatoes, 71% of 7 critics' reviews are positive. Metacritic, which uses a weighted average, assigned the film a score of 61 out of 100, based on 4 critics, indicating "generally favorable" reviews.

=== Box office ===
The film grossed $180,000 in its second week at Radio City Music Hall in New York City, which was a record for Memorial Day week, and it become the number-one film in the United States. It earned theatrical rentals of $3.25 million in the U.S. and Canada. Filmink said it "proved again that [Hayley] Mills didn't need the Disney name to bring in the punters."

=== Awards ===
Award	Category	Subject	Result
Academy Award	Best Supporting Actress	Edith Evans	Nominated
BAFTA Award	Best British Actress	Edith Evans	Nominated
BAFTA Award	Best British Actress	Deborah Kerr	Nominated
BAFTA Award	Best Cinematography (Colour)	Arthur Ibbetson	Nominated
BAFTA Award	Best British Production Direction (Colour)	Carmen Dillon	Nominated
Golden Globe Award	Best Motion Picture - Drama	Ross Hunter	Nominated
