= The Late Christopher Bean =

Play by Sidney Howard

- Original language: English
- Written by: René Fauchois; Sidney Howard
- Characters: Susan Haggett; Mrs. Haggett; Dr. Haggett; Tallant; Rosen; Ada Haggett; Davenport; Warren Creamer; Abby

Premiere
- Date: 31 October 1932
- Place: Henry Miller's Theatre, Broadway

The Late Christopher Bean is a comedy drama adapted from Prenez garde à la peinture by René Fauchois. It exists in two versions: an American adaptation by Sidney Howard (1932) and an English version by Emlyn Williams (1933). Williams's is an anglicisation of Howard's, with the action moved from near Boston to the English countryside. The events are unchanged, although two characters are renamed. The family maid, Abby in Howard's version, becomes Gwenny, a Welsh woman of mature years, and the ingénue's young admirer Warren Creamer becomes the Scottish Bruce McRae in Williams's adaptation.

Howard's version was first published in 1932 under the title Muse of All Work. It was first performed at the Ford's Opera House in Baltimore on October 24, 1932. It opened a week later on Halloween at the Henry Miller's Theatre in New York. It was produced by Gilbert Miller. After the initial run it was neglected and was not revived in New York until 2009 by TACT/The Actors Company Theatre. A film version of the play, titled Christopher Bean starring Marie Dressler and Lionel Barrymore, was released by Metro-Goldwyn-Mayer in 1933.

Williams's version opened at the St James's Theatre, London on May 16, 1933; it ran for 488 performances. Like the American production, it was produced by Gilbert Miller. The play was revived at the Victoria Palace in 1936. During the Second World War Edith Evans headed the cast in a revival under the auspices of ENSA which toured India entertaining the troops. There was a London revival at the Embassy Theatre in 1951.

The play depicts the effect on a respectable but not well-off family of the discovery that paintings bequeathed to them by a neglected artist are now highly regarded and very valuable. The ensuing outbreak of avarice affects most of the household, but the family's maid, Abby/Gwenny, remains uncorrupted and virtue is finally triumphant.

== Original casts ==
Role	New York	London
Dr Haggett	Walter Connolly	Cedric Hardwicke
Susan Haggett	Adelaide Bean	Lucille Lisle
Abby/Gwenny	Pauline Lord	Edith Evans
Mrs Haggett	Beulah Bondi	Louise Hampton
Ada Haggett	Katherine Hirsch	Nadine March
Warren Creamer/Bruce McRae	William Lawson	Barry K Barnes
Tallant	George Coulouris	Robert Holmes
Rosen	Clarence Derwent	Clarence Derwent
Maxwell Davenport	Ernest Lawford	Frederick Leister

== Plot ==
(From Howard's version of the text)

=== Act 1 ===
The story opens on a Thursday morning in a small village outside of Boston. Dr Haggett arrives home after delivering a baby and has his breakfast. He is reminded by his daughter Susan that that day is the last day that their maid, Abby, will be working for them before going to Chicago to help her recently widowed brother with his children. He then receives a telegram that an "admirer of the late Christopher Bean" will visit him that day at noon, signed by an art critic from New York named Maxwell Davenport. Putting it out of his mind, he is forced to cope with the petty quarrels of his family, including the desire of his older daughter Ada and Mrs Haggett for their traditional annual pilgrimage to Florida, a trip that seems unlikely thanks to their dwindling finances. The morning is interrupted when the village paper hanger Warren Creamer visits, showing off his recently completed paintings and offering to paint Susan and Ada. Meanwhile, Dr Haggett goes upstairs to shave, followed shortly by Mrs Haggett and Ada exiting to greet the new maid from Boston. While the family is out, Warren proclaims his love for Susan and asks her to elope with him, but is caught kissing her by Ada. Outraged, Ada calls the rest of the family back in, evoking a tidal wave of fury from Mrs Haggett, who throws Warren out of the house. Dr Haggett comforts Susan while Ada and his wife storm off, and finds himself rather unable to offer a solution to Susan's need to decide between staying and running off. He soon leads Susan upstairs so he can make his calls and so she can relax.

Meanwhile, Tallant arrives at the house and is let in by Abby. His treatment of her appears friendly enough, but some of his comments rub her the wrong way. Dr Haggett comes downstairs, and Tallant begins to explain that he has come to pay off the debt to the doctor left behind by his late friend, Chris Bean. Mistaking Tallant for Davenport, the doctor shows Tallant the telegram he received that morning, which gives Tallant the idea to pose as Davenport. Tallant then pretends that Bean's work is of limited value, as the Haggetts previously believed, but requests to take the paintings away as "souvenirs." Dr Haggett readily agrees, and gives Tallant two paintings that are in questionable condition. He also asks Abby to examine the attic for any other paintings, explaining to her that Tallant is Davenport, a friend of Bean's. This statement strikes her as suspicious, but she reluctantly agrees to search. She returns empty-handed, so Tallant decides to leave with what he has, mentioning briefly that he and Dr Haggett might go into business together. Dr Haggett becomes very excited by the small debt that Tallant paid him and the prospective business, but Abby warns him to keep an eye on Tallant, whose extensive knowledge of Bean she finds disturbing.

=== Act 2 ===
Realizing his need to fool Abby as well lest she blow his cover, Tallant quickly returns to the Haggett home in the hopes of having a private conversation with her. She confronts him about his claim to be a friend of Chris Bean's, stating that the only friend Bean ever mentioned was Bert Davis. Thinking quickly, Tallant says that he is indeed Davis, using Davenport as a professional name. Abby then lightens up, and expresses the close relationship she shared with Chris and the things about art that he taught her. Pretending to be sympathetic, Tallant gently coaxes her into revealing that she still possesses a life-size portrait of herself, painted by Chris and whose existence is unknown to the world at large. He asks that she visit him that night at the hotel he's staying at and that she bring the portrait. She shoos him away, afraid the Haggetts will find them talking, and promises to contemplate his offer to buy the portrait from her. Susan then rushes in and confesses her dilemma to Abby, followed shortly by the arrival of Warren. The three conspire to leave that afternoon, Abby to go to Chicago and Susan and Warren to elope. Warren says that they must meet at four-thirty that day in order to catch Abby's five o'clock train, then leaves.

Warren's departure is followed almost immediately by the arrival of Rosen who, like Tallant, succeeds in making Abby uncomfortable with his knowledge of her and the household. He greets Dr Haggett by insisting on paying Chris Bean's debts, and asking if he could buy all of Bean's paintings for $1000. Stunned, Dr Haggett admits that he gave the paintings away to Davenport. Rosen is dissatisfied with this story, knowing Davenport to be more honest than to take any painting without paying the proper price. They go into the doctor's office to discuss this problem, while the real Davenport arrives right on time at noon. He too knows a lot about Abby, who has now reached a breaking point in light of all the suspicious visitors of that day. Davenport quickly introduces himself to Dr Haggett, who has now returned with Rosen. Rosen confirms that this is indeed the real Davenport, which frightens Dr Haggett, who has no idea now who the first man was. Davenport explains that he is there to collect information on Bean for a biography. He explains that Bean is a revered artist in New York and that his letters have been published the latest issue of the "Atlantic Monthly." Dr Haggett, finally realizing the meaning of the day's prior events, confesses that a third man simply took away the paintings of which he knew. Stressed considerably now, he requests that Davenport and Rosen return later.

As Abby prepares lunch for the Haggetts, the doctor learns from his wife that she burned the other paintings left there by Bean. They also recall the portrait of Abby in her room and conspire on how to steal it, but to their dismay fail. Dr Haggett's anger and stress are exacerbated by numerous phone calls from New York requesting that he sell the Beans that he has. A confused Abby finally serves the distraught family their lunch.

=== Act 3 ===
Act 3 opens with Davenport returning and Dr Haggett having left to investigate the whereabouts of Tallant. Susie explains to Davenport her plans to elope and asks his opinion of Warren's paintings, afraid that, if she marries him, they will run into financial trouble. She then offers to show Davenport around the village and give him details on Bean's life there. Dr Haggett finally returns, having learned Tallant's name and that he's placed the stolen paintings in a bank vault.

Desperate, he, Mrs Haggett, and Ada try to fool Abby into selling them her portrait. She brings it into the living room, but still refuses to part with it. Tallant finally returns to talk to Abby, who quickly brushes him off and goes upstairs to pack. Dr Haggett now confronts Tallant, who requests that Mrs Haggett and Ada leave them alone. Tallant explains that the business he had in mind was the forgery of paintings by dead artists, and reveals that he himself is an accomplished artist and forger. Dr Haggett agrees to join Tallant's scheme, but Rosen then arrives looking to purchase real Christopher Bean works. Ditching Tallant, Dr Haggett single-handedly haggles with Rosen and sells him Abby's portrait. Meanwhile, Davenport returns to verify the authenticity of Abby's portrait and to try and deter Rosen from scamming the Haggetts. Warren arrives to help Abby pack, but Abby is distracted by the apparent sale of her painting, which Dr Haggett tries to claim she had sold to him. Her strong protests make him feel ashamed, but when she now reveals that she had saved the paintings that Mrs Haggett thought she had burned, he demands that she show them to him. Tallant, realizing his scheme to forge Chris Beans is now at an end, quickly leaves. Rosen and Davenport assess the paintings, while Abby miserably tries to say goodbye. Susie and Warren take her things out to Warren's truck, and Abby turns to go. Davenport catches her and begs her to consider loaning her portrait to an art museum, where it'll be safe and near her so she can visit it. She confesses to him that she married Christopher Bean, which quickly ends Dr Haggett's and Rosen's business dealings. Rosen, realizing that the portraits are rightfully hers and thus impossible to purchase (considering her attachment to them), gives up. Dr Haggett, realizing that Abby now has legal claim to the paintings and her portrait, gives them to her and sits miserably in his chair, with Mrs Haggett and Ada mourning their lost chances and Davenport smiling widely at Abby's triumph.

== Characters ==
=== Characters on stage ===
- Dr Milton Haggett—Dr Haggett is the first character we meet. At the play's opening, he is a humble doctor living in the countryside of Boston trying to collect his patients' bills and support his family in the difficult times of the Great Depression. He is fifty years old and declares himself free from greed, although the events of the play change his perspective on money.
- Susan Haggett—The younger daughter of Dr Haggett, a pretty girl of nineteen, Susan has genuine affection for the maid Abby and wants nothing to do with the shady art deals that ensue following Tallant's first visit to the house. She is in love with the local paper hanger and would-be artist, Warren Creamer, and wishes to elope with him.
- Abby Bean—Abby is the maid of the Haggett household, and although very compassionate and caring for the family, she soon finds herself pitted against their greed for money. Her connection with Susan is eclipsed only by her love for the title character. As we only discover at the very end of the play, she married Bean shortly before his death.
- Mrs Hannah Haggett—The strong-willed wife of Dr Haggett, Mrs Haggett is the same age as her husband, but their opinions on many matters differ. Unlike Dr Haggett, she is greedy by nature, and is quick to indulge in the business dealings of the visiting art experts.
- Ada Haggett—At twenty-six years of age, Ada is the elder Haggett daughter, and is fairly spoiled. Desperate to find a husband before her younger sister, she is devastated at the prospect of losing their annual trips to Florida, where she feels her prospects of finding a suitor are better than at home. Like her mother, her greed is considerably more powerful than Dr Haggett's.
- Warren Creamer—Warren is the village paper hanger and painter. He has painted the house and fences of the Haggett family for many years, but he secretly aspires to be a professional painter like his former mentor, Christopher Bean. He confesses this ambition and his love to Susan Haggett, asking her to elope with him. Though respected by Dr Haggett and later Davenport, Warren is generally unwelcome in the Haggett home following his kiss with Susan, which upsets Mrs Haggett and Ada.
- Tallant—Tallant is the first art expert to arrive at Dr Haggett's house. Greedy and self-centered, he follows in the tradition of those who produced fake works of Corot and Cézanne, and forges paintings of painters after their deaths. Rather than pay Dr Haggett for Chris Bean's works, he instead persuades him to give them away.
- Rosen—Like Tallant, Rosen is a greedy art expert but he differs from his rival in several ways. Unlike Tallant, he prefers to make his money by offering an inordinately low price to unsuspecting people owning valuable paintings, then sells the paintings for a higher price.
- Maxwell Davenport—Davenport apparently has no interest in possessing the paintings or indeed selling them. In the last analysis he is more concerned that the paintings be preserved and be given the appropriate reverence. He tells Dr Haggett he has come to his house in the hopes of writing a detailed biography on Chris Bean. He is sympathetic to Abby's plight, and is desperate to place proper prices on Bean's works and ensure that they reach the right hands.

=== Characters mentioned ===
- Christopher Bean—Chris Bean is the famous artist who resided with the Haggett family for the last years of his life. Poor and suffering from a drinking problem, Chris was given the Haggetts' red barn to live in, where he painted pictures of the scenery surrounding him. Taken particularly with Abby, he eventually fell in love with her and asked her to marry him. Shortly thereafter, he died of tuberculosis. At the time of his death, his work is considered to be abysmal, but ten years later (when this play takes place), he is revered as a master of art.
- Bert Davis—Davis is Chris Bean's dear friend. While living with the Haggetts, Bean wrote numerous letters to Davis, describing his life in their little village and describing his love for Abby and all the things she did for him. Abby reveals to us in the course of the play that Davis was notorious for skipping his rent, and got into the same sort of trouble as his friend. As revealed by Davenport, Davis is also dead by the time the art experts visit the Haggett household.
- The New Maid—Abby's intended successor after Abby leaves, this unnamed character is from Boston and apparently has social graces that make her superior to Abby in Mrs Haggett's eyes.
