= Basil Ashmore =

British theatrical director/author

- Born: 13 September 1915; Sutton Coldfield, Warwickshire, England
- Died: January 1998; England
- Occupations: Director; Author
- Years active: 1935–1998

Basil Norton Ashmore (13 September 1915 – January 1998) was a British theatrical director and author. In addition to writing his own plays, Ashmore also adapted and translated existing works, such as The Adventures of the Black Girl in Her Search for God and The Spoils of Poynton.

== Biography ==
Ashmore was born in Sutton Coldfield, Warwickshire, on 13 September 1915. His parents were William Gerald Ashmore and Frances Daisy Ashmore (née Shuter).

== Theatrical career ==
Ashmore began his theatrical career as an actor. He made his first stage appearance at the Birmingham Repertory Theatre in 1935. He went on to serve as assistant stage manager for the Glyndebourne Opera Company and the Covent Garden Opera. Ashmore directed his first production, Hassan, at the Midland Institute in 1937. After directing several plays from 1937 through 1974, Ashmore organized the Milton Tercentenary Festival. In 1975, he became the honorary director of the Chiltern Festival.

== Works ==
Ashmore wrote several plays. In 1957, the Wycombe Repertory Theatre featured the English-speaking premiere of Ashmore's The Threatening Storm. He was also the co-author of such plays as Strange Haven, The Triangle, Where There's a Will, and Quintet in A Flat. In addition to writing original plays, Ashmore has also adapted existing works for the stage. These include Our Little Life, The Gulls, The Adventures of the Black Girl in Her Search for God, and The Spoils of Poynton. Ashmore also translated existing works into English, such as On the High Road and Humulous.
