= The Chalk Garden (play) =

1955 play written by Enid Bagnold

- First edition (Random House, 1956)
- Original language: English
- Written by: Enid Bagnold

Premiere
- Date: 21 September 1955
- Place: Shubert Theatre, New Haven, Connecticut, USA

The Chalk Garden is a play by Enid Bagnold that premiered in the USA in 1955 and was produced in Britain the following year. It tells the story of the imperious Mrs St Maugham and her granddaughter Laurel, a disturbed child under the care of Miss Madrigal, a governess, whose past life is a mystery that is solved during the action of the play. The work has been revived numerous times internationally, and was adapted for the cinema in 1964.

== Background and first productions ==
Bagnold wrote the play with an English premiere in mind, but the West End producer, Binkie Beaumont, turned it down: "I confess I find some of the symbolism confusing and muddling." The piece was taken up by the American producer Irene Selznick, who proposed a Broadway premiere. She found the play challenging and tantalising – "I am haunted by its gossamer flashes of poetry and beauty" – but lacking in focus. In July 1954 she travelled to England to work with Bagnold for six weeks, tightening the play. They discussed the casting for the production; the author hoped Edith Evans would play Mrs St Maugham, but Selznick insisted on casting Gladys Cooper. For the enigmatic role of Miss Madrigal, Selznick hoped to cast her friend Katharine Hepburn, but Hepburn did not respond to the play and turned the part down. Selznick and Bagnold agreed to offer the part to Wendy Hiller, who declined it because she did not wish to leave England. Finally, Siobhán McKenna accepted the role.

Selznick engaged George Cukor to direct; he took the play through its rehearsals and out-of-town previews, but handed over to Albert Marre before the Broadway premiere. The designer for both sets and costumes was Cecil Beaton, whom Cukor and Selznick found intolerable to work with, but whose designs were highly praised.

The Chalk Garden was first performed at the Shubert Theatre, New Haven, Connecticut, on 21 September 1955, and was given on Broadway at the Ethel Barrymore Theatre on 26 October. It ran for 182 performances.

When Beaumont saw the enthusiastic reviews by the New York critics he immediately changed his mind about producing the piece in London. The play had its British premiere at the Alexandra Theatre, Birmingham, on 21 March 1956 and was first seen in London on 11 April at the Theatre Royal Haymarket. The director was John Gielgud, the sets were by Reece Pemberton and the costumes by Sophie Harris. The play ran at the Haymarket for 658 performances, ending on 9 November 1957.

	US cast	London cast	Replacements during London run
Maitland	Fritz Weaver	George Rose	
Judge	Percy Waram	Felix Aylmer	
Miss Madrigal (First Applicant)	Siobhán McKenna	Peggy Ashcroft	Pamela Brown; Gwen Ffrangcon-Davies; Mavis Walker
Second Applicant	Georgia Harvey	Ruth Lodge	
Third Applicant	Eva Leonard-Boyne	Janet Burnell	Margery Weston
Laurel	Betsy von Furstenberg	Judith Stott	Erica Bruce
Mrs St Maugham	Gladys Cooper	Edith Evans	Gladys Cooper
Nurse	Marie Paxton	Mavis Walker	Gwen Hill
Olivia	Marian Seldes later Lori March	Rachel Gurney	

Sources: Internet Broadway Database, and The London Stage 1950–1959.

== Synopsis ==
Mrs St Maugham lives in her country house in a village in Sussex, where the garden is on lime and chalk, making it difficult for her to succeed in her determined but incompetent efforts as a gardener. She is taking care of her disturbed teenage grandchild, Laurel, who has been setting fires. Miss Madrigal, an expert gardener, is hired as a governess, despite her lack of references. Also in the household is a valet, Maitland, who has just been released from a five-year sentence in prison. Olivia, Laurel's mother, who has remarried, arrives for a visit. When the Judge comes to the house for lunch, he reveals that he had sentenced Miss Madrigal to jail for murder.

== Revivals and adaptations ==
=== Revivals ===
The first Australian production, in 1957, featured Sybil Thorndike, Lewis Casson, Patricia Kennedy and Gordon Chater. In Britain, Gladys Cooper again played Mrs St Maugham in a 1970 revival directed by Laurier Lister at the Yvonne Arnaud Theatre, Guildford, with Joan Greenwood as Miss Madrigal, Robert Flemyng as Maitland and Donald Eccles as the Judge. Cooper and Greenwood reprised their roles in the play's first West End revival, in 1971 at the Haymarket, directed by William Chappell, with Michael Goodliffe as the Judge and Peter Bayliss as Maitland.

The first revival in New York was given by the Roundabout Theatre Company at Roundabout Stage 1 from 30 March 1982 to 20 June 1982. The cast featured Constance Cummings as Mrs St Maugham, Irene Worth as Miss Madrigal and Donal Donnelly as Maitland. The director was John Stix. As at 2020 this was the only further staging of the piece in New York, a planned production in 2017 starring Angela Lansbury having fallen through.

A 1984 British tour of the play starred Eleanor Summerfield as Mrs St Maugham and Nyree Dawn Porter as Miss Madrigal; Ernest Clark was the Judge and Bruce Montague played Maitland. A revival at the King's Head Theatre, London in 1992 again featured Cummings as Mrs St Maugham, with Jean Marsh as Miss Madrigal and Robert Flemyng as the Judge. The play was revived in Australia in 1995, starring Googie Withers, Judi Farr and John McCallum.

A 2008 production at the Donmar Warehouse, London was directed by Michael Grandage, with Margaret Tyzack as Mrs St Maugham, Penelope Wilton as Miss Madrigal, Felicity Jones as Laurel, and Jamie Glover as Maitland. In 2018 the Chichester Festival Theatre presented a new production, featuring Penelope Keith (Mrs St Maugham), Amanda Root (Miss Madrigal) and Oliver Ford Davies (Judge). The director was Alan Strachan.

=== Adaptations ===
A 1964 film adaptation featured Edith Evans as Mrs St Maugham, Deborah Kerr as Miss Madrigal, Hayley Mills as Laurel, and John Mills as Maitland. It was directed by Ronald Neame.

The BBC broadcast a radio adaptation of the play in 1968, with Edith Evans recreating her role of Mrs St Maugham, Mary Morris as Miss Madrigal, Cecil Parker as the Judge and Angela Pleasence as Laurel. The cast of the 2008 Donmar production recorded a studio performance for BBC Radio 3, first broadcast in March 2011.

== Critical response ==
=== First productions ===
The notices for the Broadway premiere were excellent. Brooks Atkinson wrote in The New York Times:

It is a coruscating piece of work – witty in the literary tradition of Congreve, the lines carefully polished, the observations of character shrewd and hard-headed, the portrait of an upper-class world intimate and objective ... There is a stimulating mind at work in The Chalk Garden. It is courageous, subtle and detached. It is one of the keenest minds that have upset the complacence of Broadway for a long time.

In The Daily News John Chapman called it "A tantalizing, fascinating and stimulating piece of theatre … the most literate and sophisticated" of recent plays. Walter Kerr of the New York Herald Tribune wrote, "I can't quite remember any other occasion in the theater when I so resisted a first act only to wind up at the end of the third wishing there were a fourth."

When the play opened in London, Philip Hope-Wallace wrote in The Manchester Guardian of experiencing "a unique theatrical pleasure" at Edith Evans's performance, invoked Chekhov's The Seagull and called the piece "a woman's play in the very best sense, being laconic, compassionate and wonderfully gay-hearted". In The Observer, Kenneth Tynan commented that The Chalk Garden "may well be the finest artificial comedy to have flowed from an English (as opposed to an Irish) pen since the death of Congreve."

=== Revivals ===
Rex Reed, in his review of the 1971 West End production, wrote: "This endearing play never seems to age, perhaps because its characters are written with such wit and brittle cleverness... It is a fragile, gossamer-winged play..."

Frank Rich reviewed the 1982 Roundabout production for The New York Times, writing: " 'The Chalk Garden' is extraordinarily modern for a high comedy set in the drawing room of a stuffy Sussex manor house: its plot and structure are elliptical; its witty lines aren't brittle but are instead redolent with what the author calls 'the shape and shadow of life.'... Bagnold's play is in part a journey to the bottom of Miss Madrigal's identity; it is also about the effect the woman has on her employer's household. Mrs St Maugham is a selfish, eccentric paragon of privilege who spends her days gardening but can't make anything grow."

== Sources ==
- Sebba, Anne (1987). Enid Bagnold: The Authorized Biography. New York: Taplinger. ISBN 978-0-8008-2453-2.
- Wearing, J. P. (2014). The London Stage 1950–1959: A Calendar of Productions, Performers, and Personnel. Lanham: Rowman & Littlefield. ISBN 978-1-322-15916-4.
