= Back to Methuselah =

Play written by George Bernard Shaw

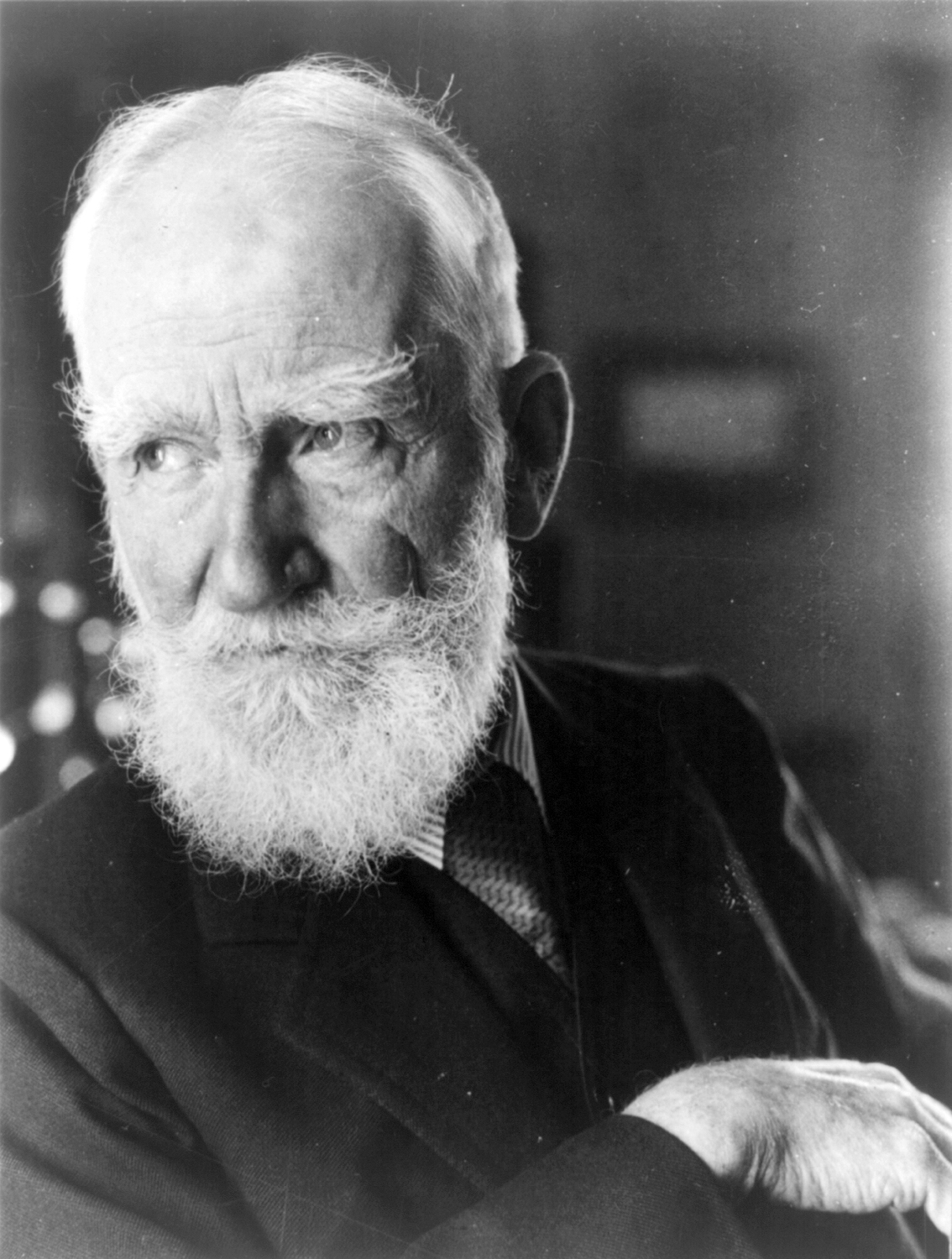
- Original language: English
- Written by: George Bernard Shaw
- Subject: Evolving stages in the future progress of humanity
- Genre: Visionary epic
- Setting: Various, spanning 36,000 years

Premiere
- Date: 27 February 1922
- Place: Garrick Theatre, New York

Back to Methuselah (A Metabiological Pentateuch) by George Bernard Shaw consists of a preface (The Infidel Half Century) and a series of five plays: In the Beginning: B.C. 4004 (In the Garden of Eden), The Gospel of the Brothers Barnabas: Present Day, The Thing Happens: A.D. 2170, Tragedy of an Elderly Gentleman: A.D. 3000, and As Far as Thought Can Reach: A.D. 31,920.

All were written during 1918 to 1920 and published simultaneously by Constable (London) and Brentano's (New York) in 1921. They were first performed in 1922 by the New York Theatre Guild at the old Garrick Theatre in New York City and, in Britain, at the Birmingham Repertory Theatre in 1923.

== Synopsis ==
=== Preface ===
In the preface, Shaw speaks of the pervasive discouragement and poverty in Europe after World War I, and relates these issues to inept government. Simple primitive societies, he says, were easily governable while the civilized societies of the twentieth century are so complex that learning to govern them properly cannot be accomplished within the human lifespan: People with experience enough to serve the purpose fall into senility and die. Shaw's solution is enhanced longevity: we must learn to live much longer; a centenarian should be less than middle aged. (Shaw was in his mid-60s when the plays were written). This change, Shaw predicts, will happen through Creative Evolution (evolutionary change that occurs because it is needed or wanted—the Lamarckian view— and not as a result of natural selection—Darwinism) as influenced by the Life Force (l'élan vital). Neither Creative Evolution nor the Life Force were Shavian inventions. Shaw says they are his names for what the churches have called Providence and scientists call Functional Adaptation and Natural Selection (among other names) and gives due credit to Henri Bergson's élan vital. Nevertheless, he uses both terms in Man and Superman which was written nine years before Bergson's work was published. These concepts had some currency among Shaw's contemporaries, and the Methuselah plays are based on Shaw's extrapolations from the two principles. Although both ideas are out of scientific favour as the twenty-first century begins, Shaw accepted them completely (See Commentary, below.) Shaw also advocates what he calls homeopathy as a pedagogical method, arguing that society "can only be lamed and enslaved by" education. Shaw's "homeopathic" educational method consisted of lying to students, until the students were able to see through the lies and argue with the teachers.

=== In the Beginning: B.C. 4004 ===
In the Beginning: B.C. 4004 is allegorical. Adam and Eve, as avatars for aboriginal humanity, discover a fawn dead from a broken neck and realize they, too, will die eventually from some mishap, even though they are immune to ageing. Their dread of death is overwhelmed by the yet more dreadful prospect of life unending, with its tedium and burdens, but they feel bound to live forever because Eden must be taken care of and they are the only ones available to do it. The Serpent—spoken of in Genesis.—offers a solution: Lilith, who came before them, and was, in fact, their mother, made them male and female, so they have the ability to reproduce. If they learn to propagate they can make other humans to tend the garden and thus be free to escape from living when they wish. Discovering the possibility of death suggests possibilities for other changes and a discussion follows that deals progressively with loneliness and love, uncertainty and fear, fidelity and marriage and the courage found in laughter. At the end the Serpent whispers—for Eve's ears alone—the secret of reproduction, which Eve hears with greatly mixed emotions.

A few centuries slip by; Eve and Adam have aged a bit, but otherwise have changed but little. She spends her time by spinning flax for weaving, he digs in the garden. Their son Cain arrives, boastful and aggressive, proud to have invented murder by killing his brother Abel. He is now a warrior who also kills beasts for food. He is utterly disdainful of the simple farming life and soon rudely goes away. Eve thoughtfully remarks that there is more to living than killing or digging in the garden and says her future sons will find things more wonderful to do.

=== The Gospel of the Brothers Barnabas: Present Day ===
The Gospel of the Brothers Barnabas is intended to teach an audience what readers of the Preface are assumed to have learned. Two brothers, one a retired, but influential cleric (Franklyn) and the other a biologist of note (Conrad), independently conclude that humans must increase their lifespans to three centuries in order to acquire the wisdom and experience needed to make complex civilizations functional. Conrad has published their conclusions in a book.

A housemaid announces the opportune arrival of Lubin and Burge, two prominent politicians with antagonistic viewpoints; they will serve as sounding-boards while the brothers present their case for the need of longer lifetimes. Members of the younger generation, in the persons of Franklyn's daughter Savvy and her sweetheart, a young cleric named Haslam, are at the presentation, too.

Both politicians seize upon the promise of enhanced longevity as a way of attracting votes. One of them is cynical, not believing longevity will happen, but the other deems the theory valid, yet rejects the prospect out of hand because longer lives will be available to everyone instead of only the elite. Savvy and Haslam are nearly unaffected because the entire idea is well above their heads. The brothers are disappointed but remain completely confident that the change is sure to happen. Except for the brothers, only the housemaid is greatly influenced by the prospect of longevity, for she turns out to be the only one who has really read Conrad's book.

[Shaw wrote an extra scene for this part, which he later deleted and then published separately as A Glimpse of the Domesticity of Franklyn Barnabas]

=== The Thing Happens: A.D. 2170 ===
The Thing Happens begins in 2170, 150 years after the Barnabas brothers disclosed their inferences, Englishmen continue immature throughout their lives. As a result, governmental dignities are mere figureheads, useful only for formalities and ceremonial occasions. The hard work of government is carried out by hired consultants from Africa and China unless competent Scots, Irishmen or Welshmen chance to be available. (The foreigners live no longer than the English, but they mature early.)

The first scene opens with England's president, Burge-Lubin (descendant and composite of the politicians seen in The Gospel of the Brothers Barnabas) squabbling with a Barnabas descendant—via telephones equipped with television—about which of them should welcome a visiting American who has invented a method for breathing underwater. Barnabas goes to meet the American inventor, who wants to use Records Office film footage to create a promotional cinema showing sundry important Britons who have lost their lives by drowning, but who, with the invention's help, might not have perished. Burge-Lubin summons Confucius, the Chief Secretary, to brief him on governmental matters. Confucius—nominally a consultant from China— is, de facto, the head of government. After their conversation, Burge-Lubin suggests a game of marine golf, but Confucius refuses on the ground that he is too mature to enjoy playing games. Burge-Lubin excuses himself, saying he must confer privately with the Minister of Health. The Minister of Health is a beautiful Black African woman, and the Presidential conference turns out to be a dalliance via long-distance videophone. She enjoys the flirting, but rejects a rendezvous and breaks the connection.

Burge-Lubin is chiding himself indulgently for mixing romance with business when Barnabas bursts in, completely overwhelmed. He reveals that the drowned notables in the film clips at the Records Office are all the same person whose multiple demises had ended several significant careers. Moreover, he has recognized the person as the currently alive and active Archbishop of York. Burge-Lubin considers that impossible and calls Barnabas mad. Meanwhile, the Archbishop, having learned of the furore at the Records Office, presents himself for questioning. The Archbishop is recognizably the Reverend Haslam, Savvy Barnabas' sweetheart, no longer callow, but dignified and confident and looking no more than fifty. He readily admits repeatedly feigning death and explains that the laws enforcing mandatory retirement at a certain age and those controlling eligibility for pensions left him with no alternative: When his record showed him old enough to be retired, he could no longer keep his job but he was always denied a pension because he looked too young. His solution was to fake his death and, as a different person, begin a new career. Barnabas hotly contested the legality of this and favoured prosecuting. Burge-Lubin, realising that he, or anyone else, might turn out to be long-lived, counsels moderation.

The discussion is interrupted by the arrival of the Domestic Minister, Mrs Lutestring to give her mandatory quarterly report. Both Burge-Lubin and Barnabas are considerably put off because they stand in awe of her although they deem her quite good-looking. She learns of the Archbishop's longevity with great interest but no evident surprise and it soon emerges that she, also, is long lived and remembers Archbishop Haslam from the time she was parlour maid for Franklyn Barnabas. After the briefest sort of conversation, the pair leaves together, obviously intending to produce some long-lived children. Consternation reigns behind them because the others realise that, with the secret out, other long-lifers, previously in hiding, will emerge to join them and form a colony that will seem a threat to short-lived people. However, counter-measures are not taken because it is realised that any one of them may be long-lived too, but not yet aware of it.

At that point the Minister of Health phones again to tell Burge-Lubin she has changed her mind and invites him to share an amorous adventure aboard her yacht, presently in Fishguard Bay. He is to take an aeroplane to the location and be dropped near the yacht by parachute. She will fish him out and dry him off and then let nature take its course. She is outraged when Burge-Lubin declines the offer. The reason for his doing so, as he tells Confucius, is that he doesn't wish to risk contracting rheumatism from exposure to the cold waters of the bay, since he might have to live 300 years, rheumatic. Confucius congratulates him on having reached the first stage of maturity.

=== Tragedy of an Elderly Gentleman: A.D. 3000 ===
The Tragedy of an Elderly Gentleman begins in 3000 AD, on the south shore of Galway Bay where an old man is found sitting on an ancient stone bollard, once used as a mooring for ships. His face is buried in his hands and he is sobbing. A woman approaches to ask if he needs help. He says no and tries to hide his tears, which he attributes to hay fever. She asks if he is a foreigner and he denies it and says he is a Briton who lives in the capital. "Baghdad?" she inquires and he says "Yes," adding that he is touring these islands for sentimental reasons because, in ancient times, they were the centre of the British Commonwealth.

Both are speaking English, but their cultural backgrounds are so different that communication is not easy. She, being long lived understands no metaphors and speaks the literal truth, while he consistently uses figures of speech instead of stating simple facts. She belongs to a colony of long-lived people and has been assigned the task of protecting short-lived visitors. Her concern is that the old man's tears are a sign that he is suffering from discouragement, a dire sickness contracted by short-livers when they talk to long-livers over sixty. Youthful nurses are provided to tourists to keep that from happening but he has evaded Zozim, the one assigned to him. He lapses into tears and she puts in a call for help, saying she has encountered an unattended short-liver who is disorientated.

While awaiting help, she asks how he obtained admission to the island, since ordinary tourists are routinely turned away. He says he is with the Prime Minister, who is married to his daughter and with General Aufsteig, who is really the Emperor of Turania, travelling incognito. They have come to consult the oracle about matters of utmost importance. Zozim catches up, recuses himself as overly mature, and asks to be replaced by someone younger. Zoo is the replacement. She is a mere girl of fifty-six and looks more like nineteen to the Elderly Gentleman, who is approaching seventy. They can converse—with difficulty—and have a long discussion that reveals the advantages of long living. Their conversation ends only when the time comes to consult the oracle.

The Emperor of Turania, calling himself Napoleon, impatient of ceremony, bursts into the courtyard of the Temple of the Oracle. He encounters a veiled woman and demands direction to the oracle. She says she is the oracle, but he has contempt for women and insists on being directed to one of the older and more able men. She tells him he would die of discouragement if he talked to elders, male or female—even with her, conversation would be dangerous if she were not veiled and robed with insulating material. He defiantly dares her to remove her veil and robe. When she merely lifts her veil he shrieks that he is dying, covers his eyes, and begs her to veil herself again. She does so and asks if he still wants to consult an older person. No longer arrogant, he asks her for advice.

He says he is the world's foremost general, invincible in battle, and adored by all his followers, although his victories cost great carnage. He is at his zenith now but realizes a time will come when the people will rebel and he will become the casualty. His question: "How am I to satisfy my genius for fighting until I die?" The Oracle thinks the answer simple: "Die now, before the tide of glory turns," she says, and fires at him with a pistol he has conveniently provided. He shrieks and falls, but rises once again, because the Oracle has missed her target. He rushes from the courtyard, blowing a whistle to summon the police, but is immobilized within a force-field near a monument of Falstaff, where he will stand and gibber until it is convenient to collect him.

Zozim and Zoo, dressed impressively in costumes that they disparage as foolish, but are demanded by their short-lived clients, lead the visiting party into the temple. It, too, is most impressive with a show of eerie lighting in a measureless abyss. Zozim belittles that display as well, but the visitors are overawed and become unnerved completely when the oracle appears as an insubstantial figure amidst flashes of lightning and peals of thunder. The Prime Minister, now called The Envoy, is too overwhelmed to ask his question until he swallows a half-pint of brandy. Thus emboldened, he grandiosely speaks of the greatness of his party, the Potterbills, currently in power, but also losing ground to the villainous opposition party, the Rotterjacks. Ultimately he is asking if it would be expedient to hold elections now or better to put them off till spring. He begs the oracle to respond in the same way she did to his illustrious predecessor, Sir Fuller Eastwind. And that request is granted: "Go home, poor fool," the oracle replies—repeating what she had said to Eastwind. Whereupon she vanishes, the lighting turns to daylight and the abyss is no more. Zoo removes and folds her costume—the magic and mystery are gone.

The answer they had expected was the one Sir Eastwind had reported: "When Britain was cradled in the west, the east wind hardened her and made her great. Whilst the east wind prevails Britain shall prosper. The east wind shall wither Britain's enemies in the day of contest. Let the Rotterjacks look to it." Sheer fabrication, but so pleasing to the voters that he stayed in power for another fifteen years. The Prime Minister's choice was clear. All he had to do was tell the public that the oracle had told him exactly what she told his predecessor and let the public believe it was what Sir Eastwind had reported. All present could attest to the truth of that, with no need for lying!

That is too much for the Elderly Gentleman to swallow. He leaves the group and seeks out the Oracle, begs her to let him stay on the island, says he will die of disgust and despair if he goes back home. The Oracle tells him that he will die of discouragement if he stays behind. He says he will take that chance, since it is more honourable. She agrees to let him stay and grasps his hands and looks at him. He rises, stiffens, and falls dead. "Poor short-lived thing!" she says, "What else could I do for you?"

=== As Far as Thought Can Reach: A.D. 31,920 ===
As Far as Thought Can Reach is in a time when short-lived people are a mere footnote in ancient history, and great longevity is the norm. The opening scene is a sunlit glade at the foot of thickly wooded hill, on a warm summer afternoon in 31,920 AD. On the west side stands a little classic temple and in the middle of the glade there is a marble altar, shaped like a table, and long enough for a man to lie on. Rows of curved marble benches, spaced well apart, fan out from the altar. A path with stairs of rough-cut stone leads upward from the temple to the hill.

In the glade, a group of youths and maidens, all appearing to be eighteen or older are dancing gracefully to music played on flutes. As they dance, a stranger, physically in the prime of life but with a wrinkled, timeworn face, comes down the stony stairs, rapt in contemplation, and bumps heedlessly into a pair of dancers. He is an "Ancient". Remonstrances ensue and the Ancient apologizes, saying that had he known there was a nursery here, he should have gone another way. However, after a swift reconciliation, he is invited to join the festivities. The Ancient refuses, saying he is too mature for gambolling; ancients must stick to their own ways of enjoyment. He leaves and the children pledge to stay forever young, but Chloe, somewhat older, says she feels drawn toward the ancient's way of life. She is nearly four years old and is wearying of the activities of children. This leads to a rift with two-year-old Stephen, her romantic partner, but she doesn't mind because it frees her to seek solitude, where she can meditate. Acís, a three-year-old, tries unsuccessfully to comfort him, but Stephen insists on remaining disconsolate until he finds another partner.

It will be a busy day at the nursery: a birth is scheduled followed by the Festival of the Artists. A She-Ancient arrives to supervise the birthing. She asks if the child is ready to be born and Acis says the child is more than ready, that she has been shouting and kicking inside her egg and refuses to wait quietly. The birthing proceeds: In procession, youths carry a new tunic, ewers of water, big sponges and, finally a huge egg, which is placed upon the altar. The egg keeps shouting "I want to be born! I want to be born!" and internal kicking rocks it so hard that it must be held steady to keep it from rolling off the altar. The Ancient deftly opens the shell using a pair of saws and reveals a pretty girl, looking fresh and rosy, but with strands of spare albumen clinging to her body. She looks seventeen years old. The other children bathe her, despite her shrieks and protestations. Her fury turns to delight with the beauty of her tunic when they dress her. She takes a few uncertain steps, but quickly learns to walk, then the Ancient names her Amaryllis, as requested by the other children. The Ancient examines the newly born carefully and pronounces her fit to live. The other children are jubilant because defective children are painlessly destroyed. She, however, will live until she has a fatal accident, which, by the laws of chance, is inevitable for everyone. The Ancient leaves the children to their play. Amaryllis provides amusing interludes throughout the remainder of the play.

The Festival of the Artists begins. Their two greatest sculptors will show their latest masterpieces and be crowned with flowers, honoured with dithyrambs and have dances done around them. The sculptors, Arjillax and Martellus, arrive. Martellus apparently brought nothing and Arjillax is jeered because he brought busts of ancients, which the children think are ugly; they want youthful beauties, like themselves. Arjillax explains that he intends to place images in the temple that range in age from the newly-born to the full glory of maturity. Martellus laughs, but not in mockery; he says he, too, attempted such a project, but has smashed all his sculptures and thrown away his tools. Asked why, he says life alone is true and meaningful and that marble remains marble, no matter how skilfully it is shaped. Instead of sculptures, he has brought a scientist, Pygmalion, who is a greater artist than the world has seen before. Pygmalion has successfully created a pair of living, artificial human beings and is ready to display them, which he does, to an audience made impatient by his incomprehensible scientific explanations.

The creations are a man and woman, noble in appearance, beautiful to look at and splendidly attired. Arriving hand in hand, they are gratified by the attention they receive. They are plainly modelled from the primitives of the twentieth century. Pleasant at first, their behaviour soon turns murderous and Pygmalion is killed during his efforts to control them. The Ancients arrive, having sensed that they were needed, and destroy the couple painlessly. Their remains are collected, using sanitary precautions, and burnt at Pygmalion's laboratory, which is also destroyed.

The Ancients make use of the occasion to explain the realities of life to the young ones, compare artistic images to dolls and to say interest in them will be outgrown. One's own body is the last of many dolls and it will be shed, as well. A man's eventual destiny is to be bodiless, a vortex of energy, immortal, and free to roam among the stars. Tired of their talk with children, the Ancients go their separate ways. As night is falling, the children seek shelter in the temple.

Darkness ensues and the ghost of Adam appears as a vague radiance. Next come the ghosts of Eve and Cain, then those of the Serpent and Lilith, mother of mankind. Each has a say, in accordance with their characters, and Lilith prophesies an end of life's slavery to matter, whereupon the spectres vanish.

== Commentary ==
Michael Holroyd describes the plays as "a masterpiece of wishful thinking" and calls them science fiction. Methuselah is said to be Shaw's only real engagement with science fiction. Shaw uses science fictioneering in Methuselah to add plausibility to scenarios and to keep readers entertained while he propounds his vision of the human destiny. His prime interest was not scientific, but political, as stated in the Preface where he discusses changes he considers essential before mankind can govern itself successfully. The final play, As Far as Thought Can Reach, offers no solution to the problem: Humans evolve to the point of becoming free-ranging vortices of energy, able to wander, solitary, through the Universe, thus requiring no government at all. Furthermore, one of Shaw's last plays, Farfetched Fables (1950) also qualifies as science fiction, and The Simpleton of the Unexpected Isles (1934). comes close to qualifying.

Shaw had an exalted opinion of Back to Methuselah as both literature and philosophy; in the press release he wrote for its publishers (Constable & Co., London) he said it would "interest biologists, religious leaders, and lovers of the marvellous in fiction as well as lovers of the theatre" and described it as his supreme work in dramatic literature. He considered it a book for reading rather than playing on the stage, and was agreeably surprised when Lawrence Langner in New York and Barry Vincent Jackson in Birmingham insisted on producing it despite expectations of monetary loss, which were promptly justified. Unlike the plays Shaw wrote for staging, which include precise descriptions of the settings, the details of stage settings for Methuselah are sketchy and serve only to direct the imagination of the reader. When, e.g., the stage director for the Birmingham production asked how the Serpent was to be presented, Shaw responded with a clumsy sketch and suggested an artist be employed to design costume, colouring and lighting. The BBC, in contrast, was able to provide lavish scenery by sheer power of description for its 1958 radio production of the entire play,

Shaw's scientific rationale for evolving long-lived humans depended on the inheritance of acquired characteristics. This accorded with the theories of Jean-Baptiste Lamarck, even though Lamarckism was in decline and Charles Darwin's views were ascendant in 1920, when the plays were written.

According to Louis Crompton in Shaw the Dramatist (pp. 252–53):

The most extensive scholarly treatment of Back to Methuselah is H. M. Geduld's six-volume variorum edition of the play submitted as a doctoral thesis at Birkbeck College, University of London (1961). This thesis, which runs to fourteen hundred pages, includes a discussion of the intellectual and literary background, a collation of some forty editions of the text, annotations to the five parts, preface and postscript, and an account of the theatrical history of the play.

Copies of this variorum edition are available in the Goldsmiths' Library in the University of London, the Lilly Library at Indiana University, Bloomington, Indiana, and in the Rare Books Collection of the University of Texas at Austin.

One quotation from Back to Methuselah is frequently misattributed to Robert F. Kennedy, even though Kennedy stated that he was quoting Shaw—"You see things; and you say, 'Why?' But I dream things that never were; and I say, 'Why not?' In Methuselah, this statement is made by the serpent to Eve in the Garden of Eden.
