= Kate Santley =

German-born British actress, singer and comedian (c. 1837–1923)

Santley, c. 1875

Evangeline Estelle Gazina (c. 1837 – 18 January 1923), better known under her stage name, Kate Santley, was a German-born British actress, singer and comedian. After spending her childhood in the US, she came to England in 1861, where she had a successful career, later also becoming a theatre manager.

== Early life ==
Santley's parents emigrated from Germany to Charleston, South Carolina, where she was educated. At the outbreak of the American Civil War in 1861, she came to England as a practising musician, but soon afterwards went on the stage as "Eva Stella", later becoming "Kate Santley".

== Musical theatre career ==
Santley made a name in the 1860s in British music halls and Drury Lane Theatre pantomimes. Early in her career, she was popular for singing the song "The Bell goes a-ringing for Sarah." At the Oxford Music Hall, she had appeared with Euphrosyne Parepa, who later married Carl Rosa. Santley was slim and pretty and became much photographed for visiting cards, postcards and advertising. Early in her career, she played in F. C. Burnand's St. George and the Dragon.

as Princess Toto

In 1871–72, she visited the US, where she appeared on Broadway, including in a revival of the hit 1866 musical, The Black Crook. Returning to London in 1872, she appeared in Georges Jacobi and Frederick Clay's London production of The Black Crook at the Alhambra Theatre, where, the next year, she also starred in the title role in Burnand's English version of Jacques Offenbach's La Belle Hélène. Later in 1873, she sang Cunegonde in Le roi Carotte. In 1874, she played Haidee in H. J. Byron's Don Juan, then in La Jolie Parfumeuse, followed by the title role in Whittington, by Offenbach. In 1876, she played Wilhelmina in The Jolly Waterman at the Opera Comique and then created the title character in (and produced) Princess Toto, a comic opera by W. S. Gilbert and Frederic Clay. Thereafter, Clay wrote numerous songs (such as her popular hit, "Nobody knows as I know") and other operas for Santley.

In 1878, Santley produced and starred in Dipunacy, which was a popular burlesque of Diplomacy. 1879, at the Royalty Theatre, Santley played in La Marjolaine and starred in (and produced) Little Cinderella and in the hit Tita in Thibet by Frank Desprez. In 1880, she played in the Drury Lane pantomime Mother Goose (and the Enchanted Beauty) with Arthur Roberts, the popular music hall comedian. In 1883, Santley starred in the English adaptation of Edmond Audran's Gillette de Narbonne. The following year, she played in La Cosaque at the Royalty, and in 1886, she hired Sidney Jones as musical director for the tour of her musical Vetah. In 1887, she played the title role in Indiana at the Grand Theatre, Islington, and then on tour.

== Theatre management ==
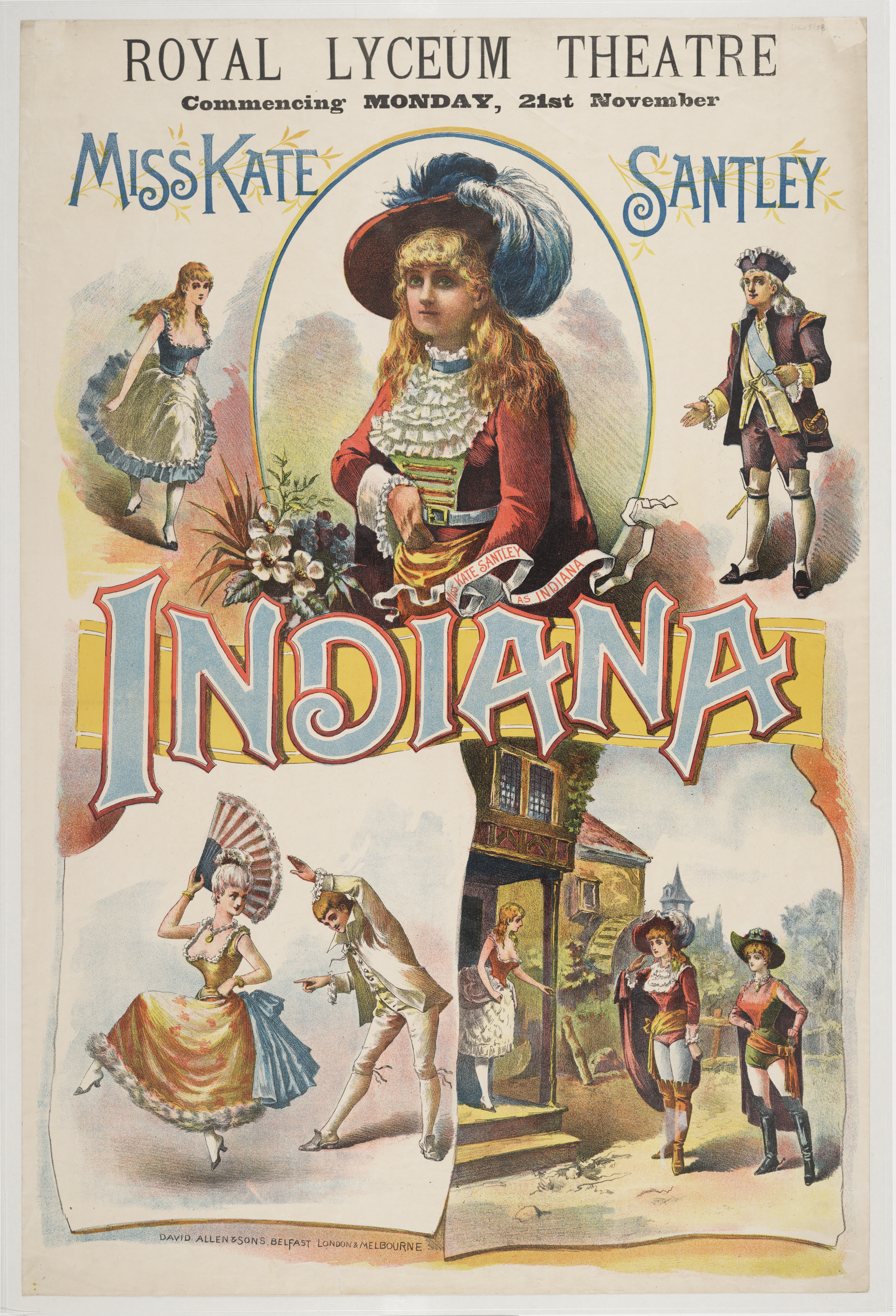
Santley in Indiana at Royal Lyceum Theatre, Edinburgh

In 1876, Santley managed Gilbert and Sullivan's revival of their one-act hit Trial by Jury at the Opera Comique. Richard D'Oyly Carte joined forces with Santley in January 1877 at the Royalty to present Lischen and Fritzen, Offenbach's Orpheus in the Underworld and Happy Hampstead by Carte (under the pseudonym Mark Lynne) and his secretary, Frank Desprez. In 1877, Santley became the manager of the Royalty Theatre, an association lasting some thirty years. She later seems to have acquired the head lease. Also in 1877, the First Chief Officer of the London Fire Brigade strongly recommended to the Metropolitan Board of Works the immediate closure of the theatre. Santley, however, had it reconstructed to designs of architect Thomas Verity, whose plans, providing improved means of egress, were approved in 1882.

Many of the productions at the Royalty were opera-bouffes adapted from the French. M. L. Mayer, formerly of the Gaiety Theatre, staged twice-yearly seasons of plays in French. The Coquelins and other luminaries of the Comédie-Française appeared here in the 1880s, when the Royalty was 'the recognised home of the Parisian drama.' There was further reconstruction of the theatre in 1883, and Santley was praised for the theatre's renovations then and in the later 1905 renovation. The opening of Shaftesbury Avenue and of new theatres in that neighbourhood, including the Lyric Theatre and the Apollo Theatre, drew audiences away from the little Royalty theatre in Dean Street, and in the 1890s the Royalty was not prospering. This led to her providing an occasional home for the Independent Theatre Society, who produced plays on a subscription-only basis – hence evading the censorship of the Lord Chamberlain's Office. The London première's of Henrik Ibsen's Ghosts (on 13 March 1891) and Émile Zola's Thérèse Raquin (on 9 October 1891), led to a storm of protest, with some critics calling for the withdrawal of Santley's licence. George Bernard Shaw's first play, Widowers' Houses, premièred for the Society at the theatre on 9 December 1892. When the theatre finally had a great success, with Brandon Thomas's play, Charley's Aunt, its popularity led to its transference after only a month to the larger Globe Theatre.

In 1895–96 the Royalty's manager was Arthur Bourchier, and the theatre underwent another renovation. He produced, among other plays, The Chili Widow, an adaptation of his own that ran for over 300 nights. In 1899, the first production of the Incorporated Stage Society took place with the first performance of George Bernard Shaw's You Never Can Tell. In 1900–01 Mrs. Patrick Campbell hired the theatre and staged a succession of contemporary plays in which she starred, and in 1903–04 Hans Andresen and Max Behrend presented a successful season of German theatre. Also in 1904, the newly founded Irish National Theatre Society gave plays by W. B. Yeats and, in 1905, it presented an early performance of Synge's first play, The Shadow of the Glen. In addition, Philip Carr's Mermaid Society produced Elizabethan and Jacobean plays.

== Personal ==
Santley married Lieutenant Colonel Lockhart Mure Hartley Kennedy in 1901. She was able to read her own obituaries when premature news of her death circulated in 1880. She died at her home in Brunswick Square, Brighton, in 1923. She claimed that she was born in 1843, but like many actresses, her actual birthday was likely earlier, and some sources date her birth to 1837.
