= J. T. Grein =

British impresario (1862–1935)

J.T. Grein
- Grein in 1898
- Born: Jacob Thomas Grein; 11 October 1862; Amsterdam, Netherlands
- Died: 22 June 1935 (aged 72); London, England, United Kingdom
- Occupations: Theatre impresario; producer/director; drama critic
- Known for: Introducing European Theatre to London; Establishing the Independent Theatre Society (founded in. 1891); German Theatre in London Programme
- Spouse: Alice Augusta Greeven (m. 1904-)
- Awards: Order of the Red Eagle

Jacob Thomas "Jack" Grein (generally referred to as J. T. Grein; 11 October 1862 – 22 June 1935) was a British impresario and drama critic of Dutch origin who helped establish the modern theatre in London.

== Biography ==
Grein was born and raised in Amsterdam, Grein moved to London in 1885 and worked for the Dutch East India Company was naturalised as a British subject in 1895. His greatest achievement was founding the Independent Theatre Society in 1891, based on the concept of Andre Antoine 's Naturalistic Theatre Libre in Paris.

Their first production was Ghosts by Henrik Ibsen in 1891. Their performances were held as "private" subscription performances, which allowed them to present plays that were not officially licensed by the Lord Chamberlain's Office.

In 1892, the Society produced Widowers' Houses, the first play by George Bernard Shaw.

Grein married the actress Alice Augusta Greeven in 1904; she later wrote and edited a biography of him under the pen name Michael Orme. She also wrote a number of plays as Michael Orme and as Alix Greeven.

The Greins worked continually to introduce European drama to London. They founded the German Theatre in London Programme in 1900, hosting German actors and directors such as Max Behrend and Hans Andresen in productions of German drama (performed in German). This programme lasted, in various forms, until 1908.

The influences were not all one way: in April 1907, Grein organised a visit by Herbert Beerbohm Tree's company – based at His Majesty's Theatre – to Hanover and Berlin. The visit was made at the personal invitation of the German Emperor; the imperial railway train transported them from the Hook of Holland. Grein and Tree were awarded the Order of the Red Eagle for their successful tour.

In 1930, he founded 'The People's National Theatre', with Nancy Price.

Grein died of a heart attack at his London home in 1935, aged 72.
