= Madeleine Lucette Ryley =

English actress and playwright (1858–1934)

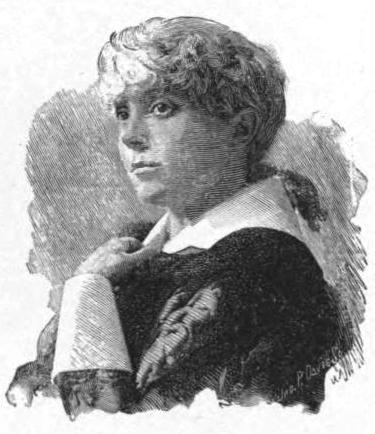
- Madeleine Lucette, from an 1893 publication
- Born: Madeline Matilda Bradley; 26 December 1858; London, England, United Kingdom of Great Britain and Ireland
- Died: 7 February 1934 (aged 75); Hampstead, London, England, United Kingdom
- Occupations: Actress and playwright
- Spouse: J. H. Ryley

Madeleine Lucette Ryley (26 December 1858 – 7 February 1934) was an English actress and playwright known for her plays in London and then America in the late 1800s. She began writing plays under the pseudonym Noel Grant until she gained fame as a dramatist. Ryley wrote 27 plays and directed many of them herself, the best known being Mice and Men, Christopher Jr and An American Citizen, some of which were adapted on film in the early 1900s. She was an advocate for women's rights and was involved in the suffragette movement. Ryley rarely wrote suffragette drama for fear of trivializing complex political arguments.

== Early life ==
Ryley was born Madeline Matilda Bradley to Alfred and Madeline Bradley in St. Mary, London, the oldest of six children. She adopted the stage name "Madeline Lucette" early in her career. She likely met her husband, J. H. Ryley, while touring with Richard D'Oyly Carte's Comedy Opera Company while performing in Congenial Souls in 1878. They continued touring together for several years. In 1882, news clippings of The Sorcerer, a Gilbert and Sullivan opera, billed Ryley for the first time as Mrs. J. H. Ryley. It came as a shock to the friends and neighbors of the couple when it was revealed that they were not legally married until 1890, after J. H. Ryley obtained a divorce from his first wife, English character actress Marie Barnam.

== Career ==
=== Early career ===
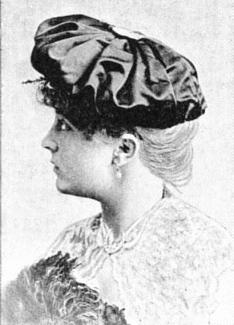
Madeleine Lucette Ryley (1889)

Ryley first appeared onstage at the age of fourteen in London, playing Queen of the Fairies in an annual Christmas pantomime. She performed roles in light opera companies, including Carte's Comedy Opera Company with which she toured the British provinces in 1878 in the chorus of The Sorcerer and H.M.S. Pinafore, both starring J. H. Ryley. She had roles in the short companion pieces, Two Sharps and a Flat (Mrs. Minor) and Ryley's own Congenial Souls (Clara). Her American debut was in Princess Toto by W. S. Gilbert and Frederic Clay in Boston, and her first New York performance was in 1881 either in Solomon and Stephens's Billee Taylor with the D'Oyly Carte Opera Company, as Susan, or in Reward of Virtue. In 1882, she appeared in a production of The Sorcerer at the Bijou Opera House in the soubrette role of Constance. Ryley received rave reviews for her performance. When the star of the production, Lillian Russell, fell ill, Ryley filled in as the leading role, Aline. Ryley also played Constance at the Casino Theatre in 1893. Ryley continued performing in operas with mixed success before transitioning to non-musical plays in 1891, performing the role of May Hoaford in The Power of the Press. Although the melodrama by Augustus Pitou and George H. Jessop was not a critical success, the production ran for over fifty performances before going on tour.

Much of Ryley's early writing was done in secret. While she was still acting, Ryley was also writing short stories, drawing sketches for magazines, and she gained unaccredited writing experience with the McCaull Opera Company. Ryley stated: "Colonel McCaul, finding I was quick at writing songs and fixing up scenes, employed me at what is termed 'hack work,' on the understanding that my name was never to appear. He explained that women were not supposed to have a sense of humor, and that a topical song or a comedian's scene coming from a woman would not be tolerated!" Ryley penned her first comedy, Lady Jemima, in 1890 in two weeks. Minnie Maddern bought the piece and eventually produced it.

Ryley's career as a professional dramatist had a strong sendoff in 1894 with Christopher, Jr.'s original Brooklyn production. According to Ryley, the play took "five weeks to write and five years to place." Christopher, Jr. is a comic play that mixes well-rounded characters, ridiculous circumstances and clever dialogue. This original cast starred John Drew Jr. and Maude Adams. The Critic declared that overall, a "merrier little piece … has not been presented here for a long time, and the fun has the conspicuous merit of being entirely wholesome." Christopher Jr. ran for 64 performances and continued in Drew's repertoire for some time. Americans found Christopher Jr. to be a riotous comedy, but Londoners, when the play was performed as Jedbury Junior, read it as a domestic drama. The play achieved commercial success in both countries.

=== Later dramatic work and activism ===
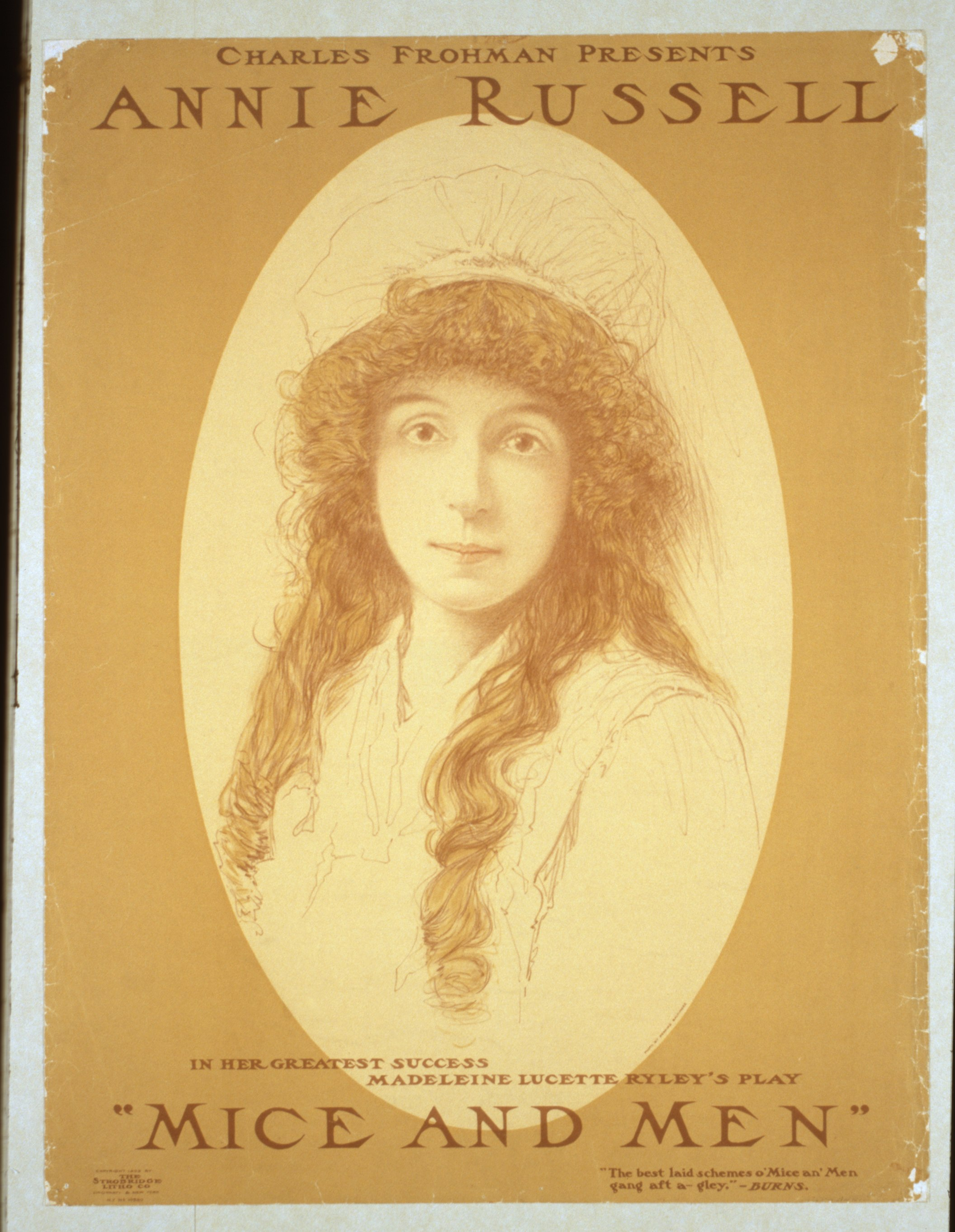
Poster for Mice and Men on Broadway, starring Annie Russell (1903)

In 1902, Ryley was writing and directing new works while productions of her plays Mice and Men and Jedbury Junior were receiving tours and revivals, respectively. By 1907, Ryley had either quit writing plays or simply could not interest anyone in her later work. By this time, she had written 27 plays. The Boston Transcript described her plays and position in the dramatic profession as follows: "These were all clean, wholesome comedies, and she scored heavily, for she proved, in contradistinction to many of her contemporaries, that American audiences could be entertained and amused by Anglo-Saxon themes and witty comedy as readily as those of Latin origin with their salacious plots and suggestive dialogue. Indeed, as far as women playwrights are concerned, she now has the field almost to herself."

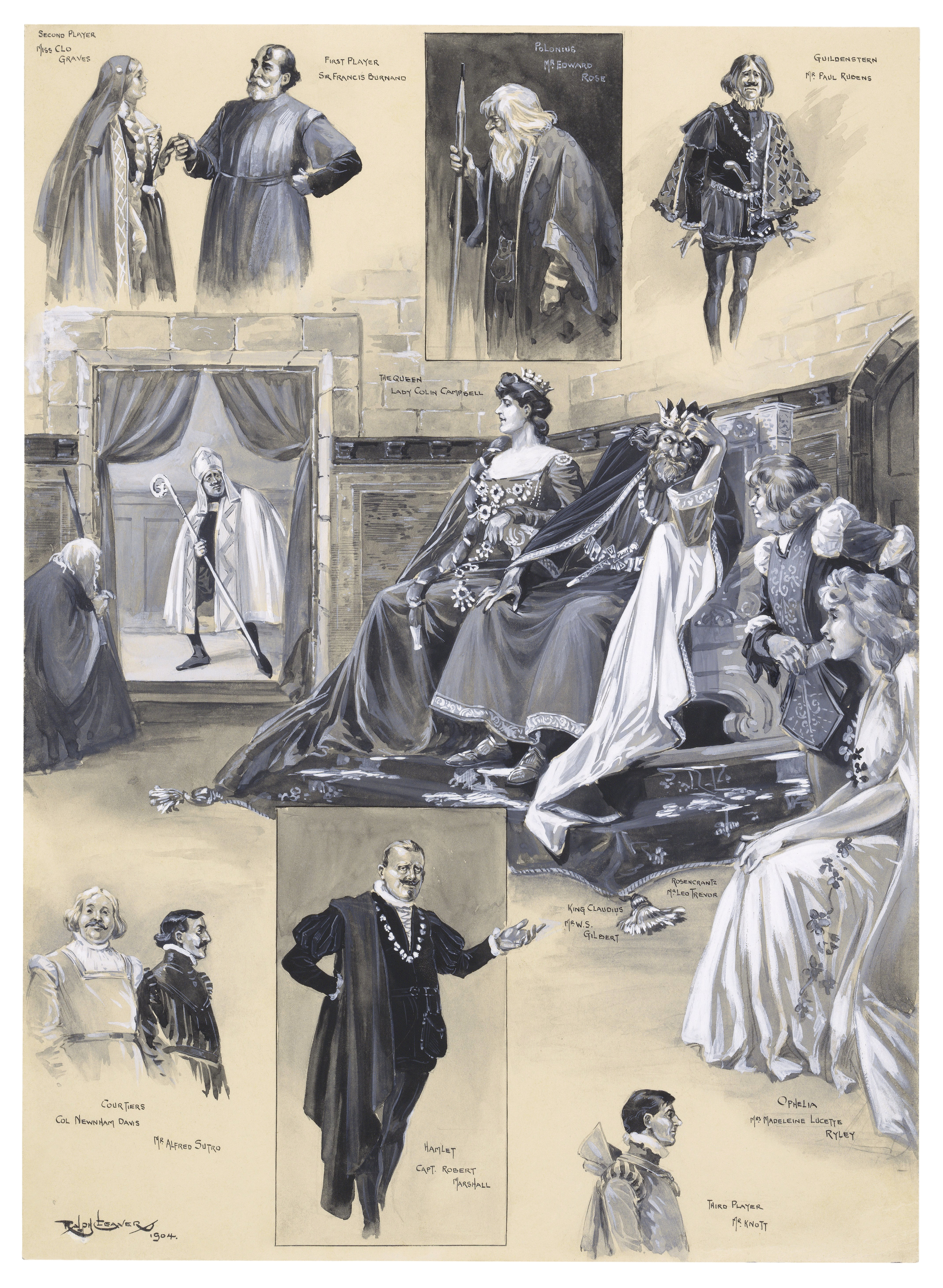
1904 benefit performance of W.S. Gilbert's Rosencrantz and Guildenstern with Ryley as Ophelia (far right, seated)

Although semi-retired, Ryley still performed occasionally, including in a 1904 benefit matinee at London's Garrick Theatre, where she played Ophelia in W. S. Gilbert's Rosencrantz and Guildenstern. She remained active in the theatre community until the 1920s and served as one of several vice-presidents of the Actresses' Franchise League from its formation in 1918 with the passage of the Woman Suffrage Act, speaking regularly for the league at open-air meetings.

When asked why women should have the right to vote, Ryley replied, "[L]ooking at it from the standpoint of common sense, I think it necessary for the progress of humanity – necessary as the means to an end. Women must be educated to their responsibilities, and as long as the Vote is denied them they will remain uneducated. My point of view is impersonal and altruistic." Despite Ryley's work with the Woman Suffrage Movement, she did not write suffrage drama. She believed that such works risked trivializing complex political arguments.

== Death ==
Ryley's death in Hampstead, London, in 1934 was covered in both London and New York newspapers.

== Bibliography ==
- Lady Jemima, three-act comedy (Produced outside of New York by Minnie Maddern) (1890)
- The Junior Partner, four-act comedy (1890)
- Valentine's Day, three-act comedy (1891)
- The Merchant of Pongee, unproduced musical c. 1890s (Typescript, SA) (1891)
- The Basoche, American version of libretto, (Casino Theatre, 27 February – 11 March 1893)
- The Promised Land, four-act play (1893)
- The Golden Calf, four-act drama (1894)
- Christopher, Jr. (Empire Theatre) (1895)
- As Jedbury Junior in London (Terry's Theatre and Globe Theatre) (1895)
- The Time of Strife, one act (1895)
- The Mysterious Mr. Bugle (Lyceum Theatre and Strand Theatre, London in 1900) (written 1897)
- A Coat of Many Colors (Wallack's Theatre) (1897)
- An American Citizen (Knickerbocker Theatre, Duke of York's, London in 1899, 1914 film) (written 1897)
- The Voyagers (Grand Opera House) (1898)
- On and Off, adaptation of Alexandre Bisson's Controleur des Wagons-lits (Madison Square Theatre) (1898)
- Realism, one-act (Garric Theatre, London) (1900)
- My Lady Dainty (Madison Square Theatre) (1901)
- Richard Savage, based on Dr. Johnson's Lives of the Poets (Lyceum Theatre) (1901)
- Mice and Men, also became a film (Theatre Royal, Manchester, Lyric Theatre, London, Garrick Theatre) (1901)
- The Grass Widow (Shaftsbury Theatre, London) (1902)
- An American Invasion (Bijou Theatre) (1902)
- The Altar of Friendship (Knickerbocker Theatre, New York, Criterion Theatre, London in 1903)
- The Lady Paramount (California Theatre, San Francisco) (1905)
- Mrs. Grundy (Scala Theatre, London) (1905)
- La belle Marseillaise, adapted from P. Berton's The Great Conspiracy (Knickerbocker Theatre, Duke of York's, London in 1907)
- The Sugar Bowl (Queen's Theatre, London) (1907)

== Sources ==
- Engle, Sherry D. (2007). New Woman Dramatists in America 1890–1920. Palgrave Macmillan. ISBN 978-0-230-60936-5.
