= Vernona Jarbeau =

American actress (1861–1914)

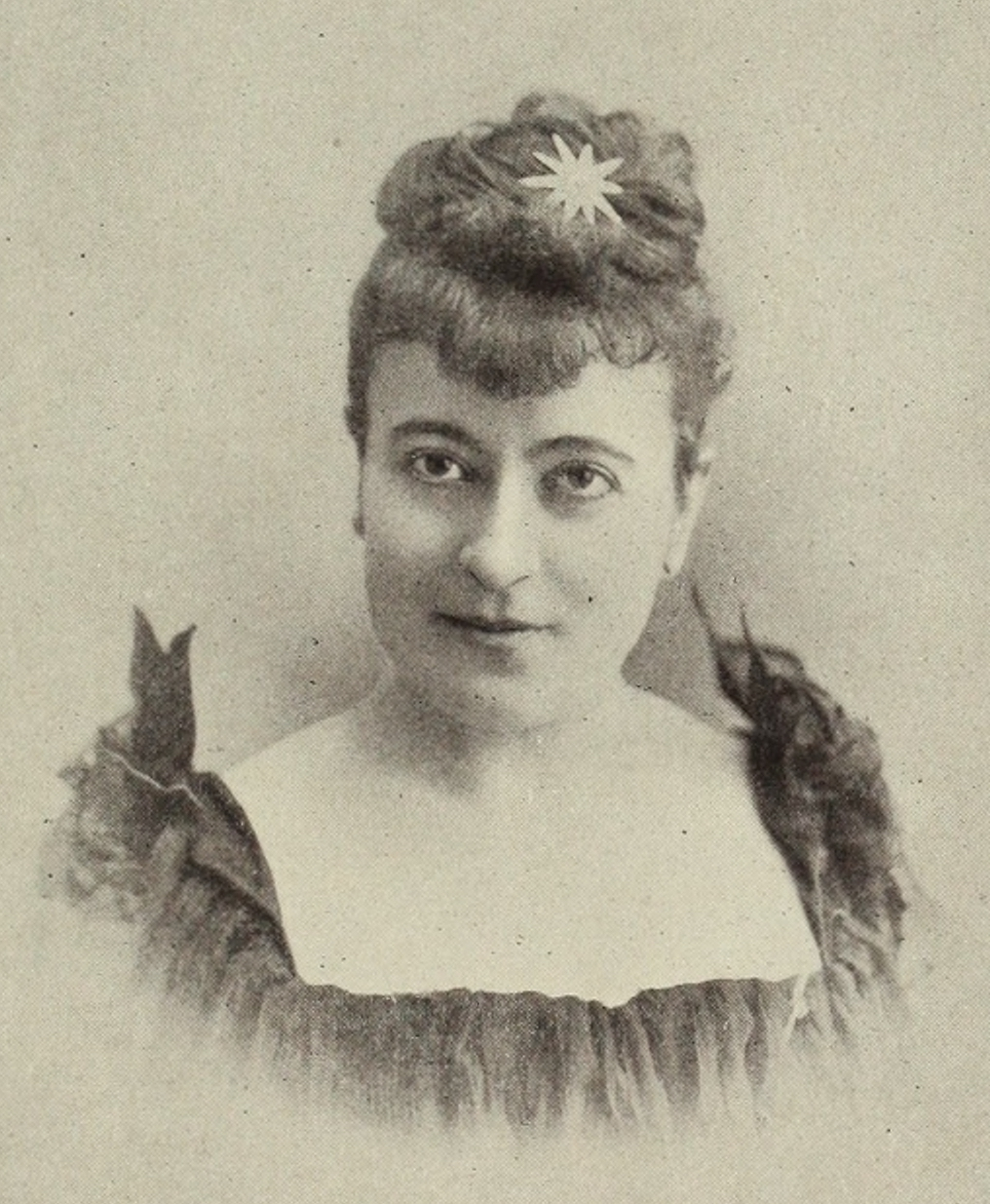
- Born: 1861; New York
- Died: October 16, 1914 (aged 52–53); Nanuet, New York
- Occupation(s): actress, operatic soprano

Vernona Jarbeau (1861–1914) was an American comic actress, operatic soprano and vaudeville performer. She was known for her roles in comic operas. She was especially known for her performances as Yum-Yum in The Mikado and Hebe in H.M.S. Pinafore, in early American productions of the Gilbert and Sullivan operas. Later in life, she became a breeder of prize-winning French bulldogs.

== Career ==
Jarbeau was best known for playing the roles of Yum-Yum in The Mikado and Hebe in H.M.S. Pinafore. She also appeared in productions of A Message from Mars and Mazeppa.

In 1879, Jarbeau was part of a company of actors working under Max Meretzek in New York. In April 1881, Jarbeau replaced Alice Burville as Arabella Lane in the D'Oyly Carte Opera Company's production of Billie Taylor.

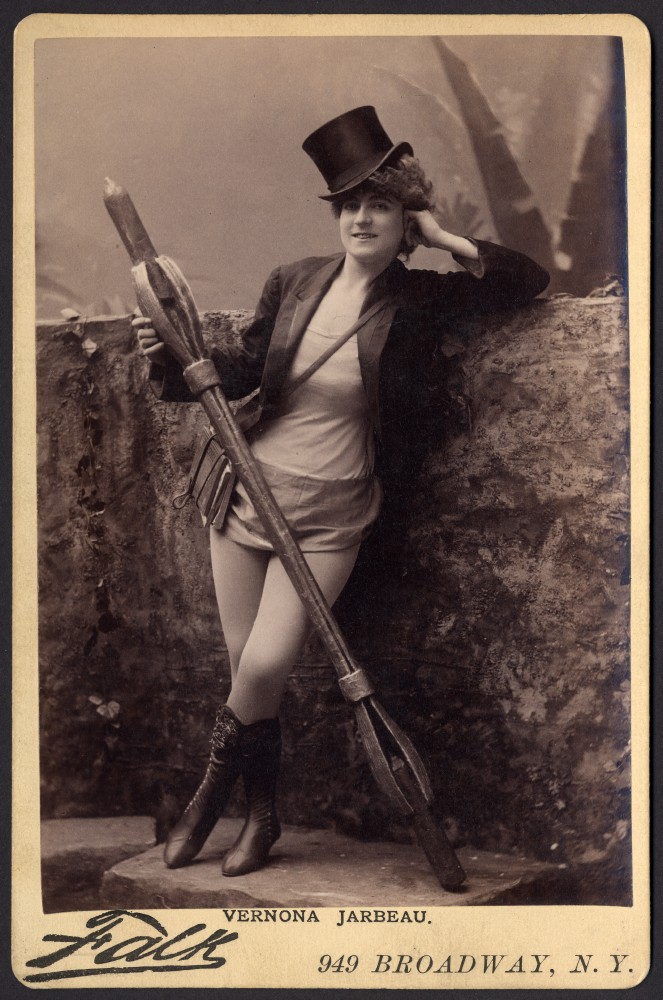
Vernona Jarbeau (c. 1885)

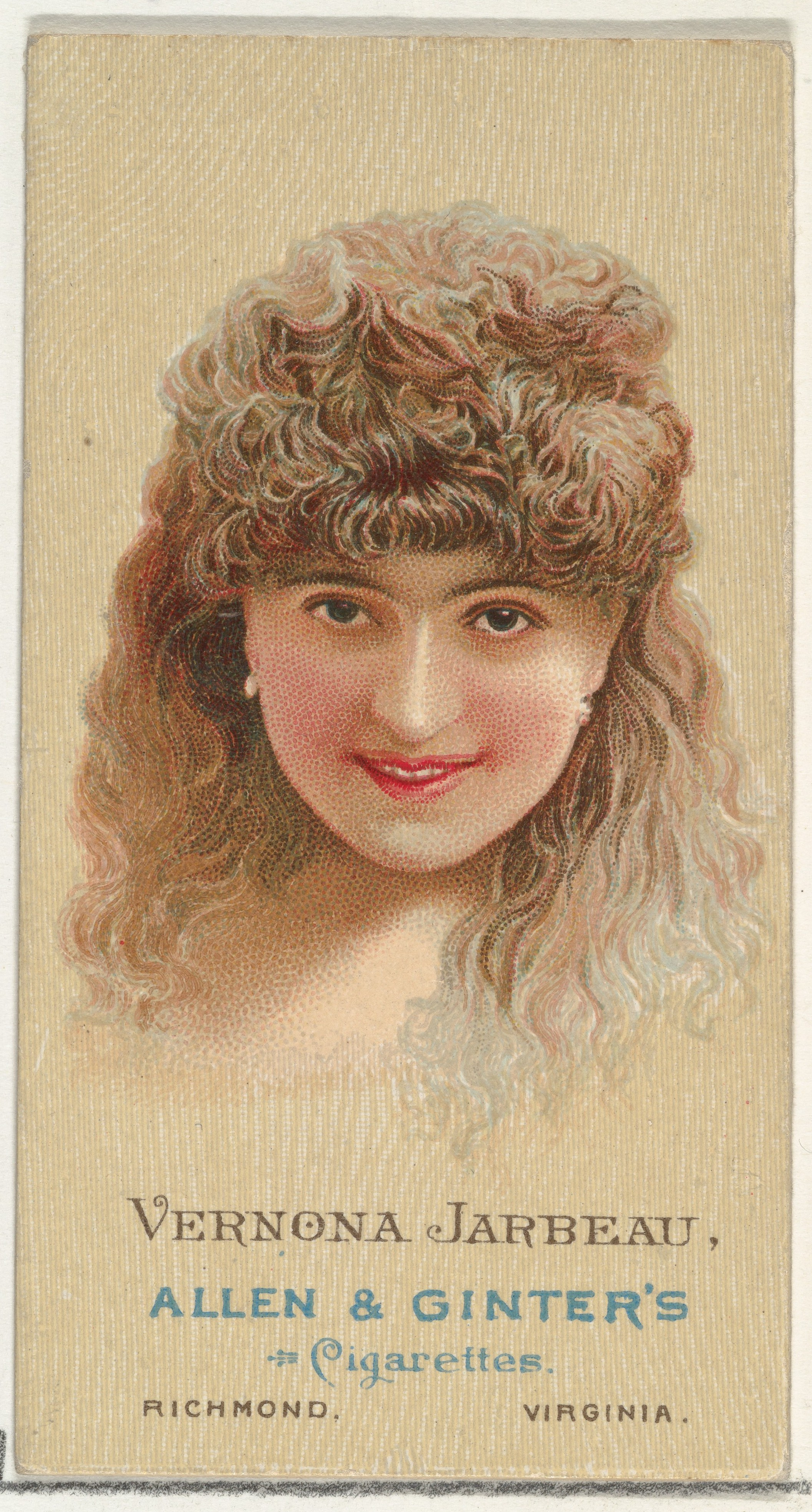
Vernona Jarbeau, from the series of "World's Beauties" promotional cards for Allen & Ginter cigarettes (1888)

By 1888, Jarbeau, along with her husband Jefferson Bernstein, led a company of entertainers which toured across the United States. In the 1890s and 1900s, Jarbeau performed in vaudeville shows across the United States and was often advertised as the primary draw for audiences. Her early vaudeville acts included songs and celebrity imitations, with her impressions of Albert Chevalier and Louise Théo being especially popular. In 1904, Jarbeau performed in a sketch alongside English actor Charles Hawtrey.

== Private life and death ==
=== Early life and marriage ===
Vernona Jarbeau was born in New York in 1861. Her parents were Vernon and Marie Jarbeau.

In Chicago in 1885, Jarbeau married theater manager Jefferson Bernstein, with whom she had at least one child. Upon their marriage, the Chicago Tribune published the following poem:

And so you're wedded to Jarbeau,
Mr. Bernstein.
Ah, well, she's a plump morceau,
Pulsating, peachy, all aglow,
Mr. Berstein.
She's warm enough to move a log,
Mr Bernstein;
Be good to her—and love her dog,
Mr. Berstein.

— Chicago Tribune, December 6, 1885 Issue, p. 4

Following her marriage, Jerbeau continued to be known professionally as "Miss Jarbeau."

In 1888, Jarbeau and Bernstein were sued by the Hasselman-Journal Printing House in Indianapolis for a $1,200 bill which they had not paid. The suit was resolved out of court with Jarbeau and Bernstein paying the bill and claiming they had assumed it had already been paid. In 1889, Jarbeau and Bernstein were involved in another financial dispute when Will S. Rising alleged that they had not paid him the money that was due to him under contract.

=== Later life and death ===
After retiring from acting following her husband's death in 1911, Jarbeau became active in the breeding of French bulldogs at her kennel Vernie Farm in Nanuet, New York. In 1914, Jarbeau was offered $2,000 to sell her prize winning dog La Belle Cora, but declined the offer, reportedly saying, "No money could buy Cora."

Jarbeau died on October 16, 1914, in her home in Nanuet. She was 53 years old.

About six months before her death, Jarbeau had converted to Episcopalianism and was confirmed at The Little Church Around the Corner in Manhattan.
