= Christopher, Jr. =

Christopher, Jr. is a four act American play, by Madeleine Lucette Ryley.

In June 1895, it tried out in Wilkes-Barre. It was featured on Broadway on October 7, 1895, at the Empire Theater, and starred Maude Adams.

== Bibliography ==
- Christopher Junior: comedy in four acts. Samuel French. 1889.
