= Billee Taylor =

Comic opera by Edward Solomon and Henry Pottinger Stephens

Arnold Breedon as Billee

Billee Taylor, or The Reward of Virtue is "a nautical comedy opera" composed by Edward Solomon, with a libretto by Henry Pottinger Stephens. The satiric, cynical risqué story is based on the nautical poem and song of the same title by Richard Brinsley Sheridan. The plot concerns the maneuvering of three men, Billee, Captain Flapper and Christopher Crab, for the hand of poor but beautiful Phoebe; another woman, Arabella, also wishes to wed Billee.

The piece was first produced at the Imperial Theatre in London on 30 October 1880, followed by a Broadway debut at the Standard Theatre on February 19, 1881. The show was a success in both cities and was regularly revived. A version of this adult-themed story was created for children and published in 1881.

== Performance history ==
Billee Taylor was first produced at the Imperial Theatre in London on 30 October 1880, starring Arthur Williams as Sir Mincing Lane and Frederick Rivers as Billee.

The first Broadway production opened at the Standard Theatre on February 19, 1881. Co-produced by Richard D'Oyly Carte and Edward E. Rice, the cast included Arnold Breeden in the title role, W. H. Seymour as Sir Lane, J. H. Ryley as Captain Flapper, William Hamilton as Christopher Crab, Alice Burville as Arabella Lane, Madeleine Lucette as Susan, Nellie Mortimer as Eliza Dabsey, Carrie Burton as Phoebe, and A. W. F. McCollin as Ben Barnacle.

Billee Taylor was a strong success on both sides of the Atlantic and enjoyed many revivals both in Britain and in the United States. Early revivals included The Gaiety Theatre, London (1885, with Marion Hood as Phoebe and Arthur Roberts as Barnacle) and Toole's Theatre (1886). On Broadway it was revived at the Casino Theatre in 1885 with a cast that included Robert C. Hilliard as Billie, Vernona Jarbeau as Arabella, Lillian Russell as Phoebe, Josie Hall as Susan, Alice Barnett as Eliza, and J. H. Ryley returning as Captain Flapper.

== Roles and original cast ==
- Billee Taylor ("a virtuous gardener", in love with Phoebe) – Frederic Rivers
- Sir Mincing Lane (one of the "nouveau-riche") – Arthur Williams
- Christopher Crab (a schoolmaster with a longing to be a genuine villain) – J. A. Arnold
- Captain, the Hon. Felix Flapper (of "H. M. S. Thunderbomb") – Fleming Norton
- Ben Barnacle (a sailor) – J. D. Stoyle
- Arabella Lane (the daughter of Sir Mincing Lane) – Emma Chambers
- Phoebe Fairleigh (a charity girl) – Kathleen Corri
- Eliza Dabsey (beloved of Ben Barnacle) –
- Susan, Jane Scraggs and charity girls

== Synopsis ==
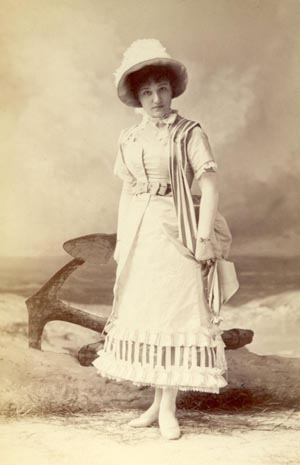
Alice Burville as Arabella

The scene is laid in Southampton, England, in 1805.

Act I

The villagers gather at The Inn of the Royal George, which overlooks the harbor, to celebrate the approaching wedding of Billee Taylor, "a virtuous gardener," and the charming, beautiful and faithful, but poor, Phoebe. Kindly old Sir Mincing Lane has arranged the feast and has invited his friend, Captain Flapper of the Royal Navy. His daughter, Arabella, has fallen in love with Billee and offers her hand and fortune, but he refuses the tempting offer. Just as Billee and Phoebe are about to wed, Captain Flapper sees Phoebe and falls in love with her at first sight, vowing to marry her himself. A tutor, Christopher Crab is also in love with Phoebe. A sailor, Ben Barnacle, has gone to sea to forget about Eliza, a woman he loves but who does not love him. To stop Billee's marriage, Captain Flapper orders Ben to abduct Billee and impress him as a seaman, which he does. Phoebe and her classmates at the charity school all decide to disguise themselves as men and join the Navy.

Act II

Two years later, at Portsmouth, Billee has rapidly risen through the ranks and is now a lieutenant. Also back in port, still disguised as sailors, are Phoebe and the girls. Arabella has been persistent, and Billee is gradually warming to her attentions. Phoebe learns of this from Captain Flapper. She rushes off to see Billee and comes upon him agreeing to marry Arabella for her dowry. Phoebe confronts Billee who rejects her. Sir Mincing Lane who is gathering a company of volunteers, tries to enlist some of the sailors. Phoebe decides to join but is claimed by Barnacle as a messmate, and the soldiers and sailors quarrel. In desperation, and at the urging of Crab, she pulls out a pistol and fires at the unfaithful Billee. The gun misfires, hitting Crab, and Billee calls for assistance from the crowd attracted by the noise. Phoebe is sentenced to be shot but declares that she is a woman in love with Billee, who has betrayed her. But, dressed as a man, she convinces no one. So she bares her breasts. Just then Captain Flapper, still smitten, happens by, rescues Phoebe, and has Billee arrested as a coward and a traitor. All ends happily.

== Musical numbers ==
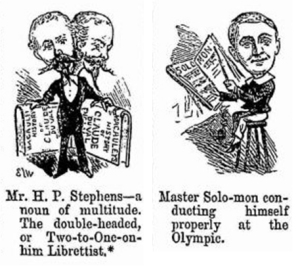
Librettist and composer caricatured in a Punch review of their opera Claude Duval

- Overture

Act I

- No. 1 - Opening Chorus of Peasants, with Solo - Crab - "Today, today is holiday"
- No. 2 - Ballad - Billee Taylor - "Let others prate of grand estate, I envy not such station"
- No. 3 - Arabella and Billee - "If you were a maiden, and I were a youth"
- Nos. 4 & 5 - Chorus of Charity Girls, and Song - Phoebe - "Though we're bred upon charity, we have lots of hilarity"
- No. 5a - Chant - Charity Girls - "Always seem to be modest and bashful" (unaccompanied and in unison)
- No. 5b - Entrance of Peasants
- No. 6 - Sir Mincing Lane and Chorus - "Many years ago I made a start with nothing, as a grocer's boy"
- No. 6a - Reprise for exit of Chorus - "For a self made man you see is he"
- No. 7 - Phoebe - "A modest maid, precise and staid"
- No. 8 - Arabella, Capt. Flapper, and Crab - "Revenge! Revenge! and retribution"
- No. 9 - Sailors' Chorus - "She can swim like a duck, and her flag's never struck"
- No. 10 - Romance - Ben Barnacle - "The yarn as I'm about to spin is all on account of Eliza"
- No. 10½ - For exit of Chorus - "All on account, all on account, all on account of Eliza"
- No. 11 - Eliza - "How I love my Benjamin, Benny!"
- No. 12 - Wedding Chorus - "Hark! the merry marriage bells! Ding-a-ding-dong! ding-a-ding!"
- No. 13 - Finale: Act I - "'Tis hard by fate thus to be parted"

Act II

- No. 13a - Entr'acte
- No. 14 - Act II Opening Chorus - "Back again! Back again! Tho' so far they roam"
- No. 14a - Hornpipe
- No. 15 - Black Cook's Dance
- No. 15a - Reprise of No. 14 for exit of Chorus - "Back again! Back again!"
- No. 16 - Crab - "I'm a villain of the deepest dye"
- No. 17 - Sir Mincing, Arabella and Billee - "Most gallant skimmer of the sea, my son in law, that is to be"
- No. 18 - Phoebe and Charity Girls - "I followed my darling Bill to sea..."
- No. 19 - Billee, Phoebe, and Charity Girls - "In days gone by our sires would try to be to all polite"
- No. 19a - Reprise for exit of Girls - "Just like that!"
- No. 20 - Capt. Flapper, Phoebe, and Susan - "A trim little craft was Phoebe"
- No. 21 - Chorus of volunteers, with Sir Mincing Lane - "With fife and drum we bravely come"
- No. 21a - Entrance of Barnacle and Sailors
- No. 22 - Concerted piece - "Don't go for to leave us, Richard Carr, we know what a messmate true you are"
- No. 22a - Reprise for exit - "Love! love! love!"
- No. 23 - Concerted piece - "See here, my lads, what would you do if you should find your love untrue"
- No. 23a - Melos
- No. 24 - Concerted piece and quarreling duet - "Stay, stay, for I am no man; Stay, stay, I am a woman!"
- No. 25 - Grand Finale - "This is a statement most untoward, can Billee Taylor be a coward?"
