= Die Freie Bühne =

Voluntary association

Die Freie Bühne (German: "The Free Stage") was a subscription-based theatre club founded in Berlin, Germany in 1889 by ten writers and theatre critics supervised by Otto Brahm for the purpose of staging new, naturalistic plays that were censored, not commercially viable, or not otherwise commonly produced. The ten founding members were Otto Brahm, Maximilian Harden, Theodor Wolff, Julius Hart and Heinrich Hart, Paul Schlenther, Julius Elias, Julius Stettenheim, Paul Jonas and Samuel Fischer. Inspired in part by André Antoine's Théâtre-Libre in Paris, Brahm's company gave private performances to subscribers only. Performances were held on Sunday afternoons. The Freie Bühne opened with a production of Ibsen's "Ghosts" (1881), in September 1889. Later productions included works by writers such as Gerhardt Hauptmann, Arno Holz, Émile Zola, August Strindberg, as well as dramatic adaptations of Tolstoy. The Freie Bühne closed in 1894, mostly due to the fact that larger, commercial theaters in Berlin had by then begun to embrace the new theatrical styles that the Freie Bühne had championed. Together with the Théâtre-Libre in Paris and the Independent Theatre Society in London, the Freie Bühne inspired a number of smaller, subscription-based theatres, known collectively as the Independent Theatre Movement.
