= Théâtre Libre =

The Théâtre Libre (French pronunciation: [teɑtʁ libʁ]; "Free Theatre") was a theatre company that operated from 1887 to 1896 in Paris, France.

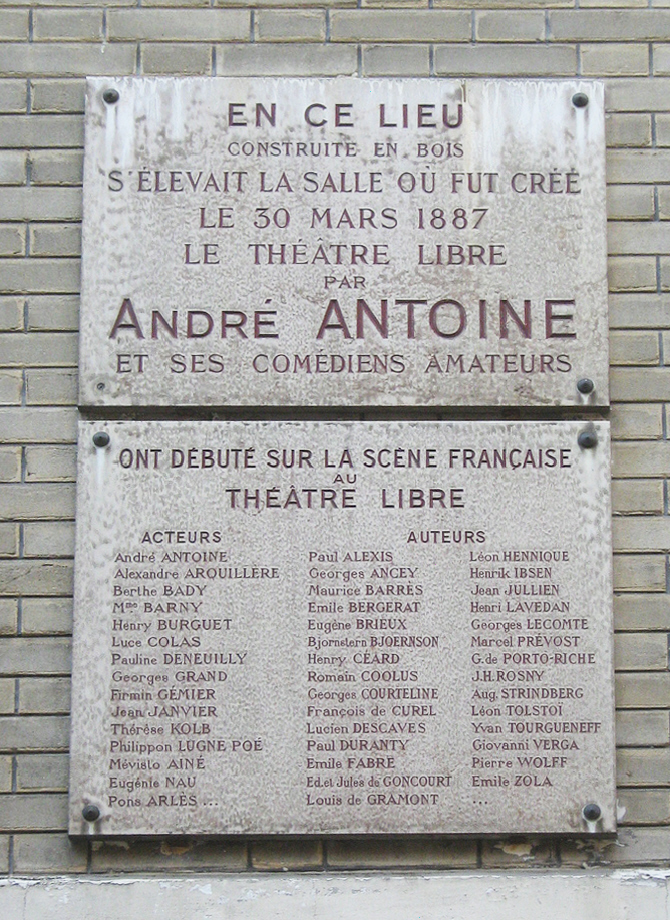
Plaque dedicated to the Théâtre Libre, its actor-director André Antoine, and its performers in Montmartre, Paris.

== Origins and history ==
Théâtre Libre was founded on 30 March 1887 by André Antoine. The primary goal of the theatre was to present new plays that were untried and unproduced by the commercial houses. Antoine was driven to open his own theatre company to create a dramatization of an Émile Zola novel, Thérèse Raquin, after the theater group for which he previously worked had refused. In order to ensure that the Théâtre Libre was exempt from censorship and could produce plays that other theaters would not, the theatre was supported solely by subscribers. This allowed the Théâtre Libre to collect no money at the door meaning it was not legally considered a theatre. Being a "free" theatre, in the case of Théâtre Libre, meant being a theatre that presented naturalism and was dedicated to producing plays in any and all genres that had not been produced before and often were considered too much of a risk to stage.

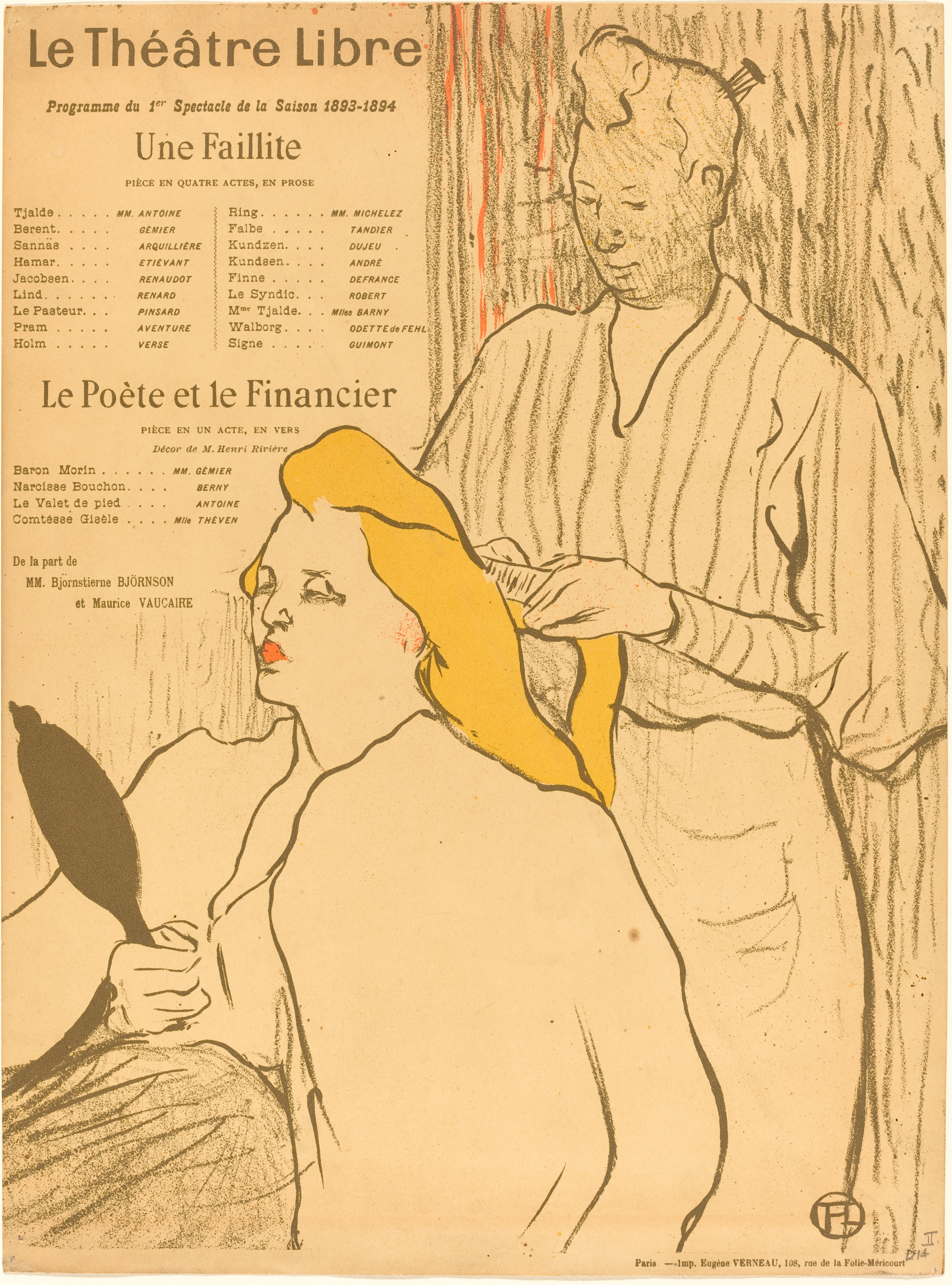
Henri de Toulouse-Lautrec, The Hairdresser - Program for the Theatre-Libre, 1893

Playbills and posters were created by artists with a realistic style that attempted to reflect the spirit of the theatre and its repertoire. Among the artists that produced promotional works for its plays were Henri-Gabriel Ibels, Édouard Vuillard, Paul Signac, George Auriol, Adolphe Willette, and Henri de Toulouse-Lautrec.

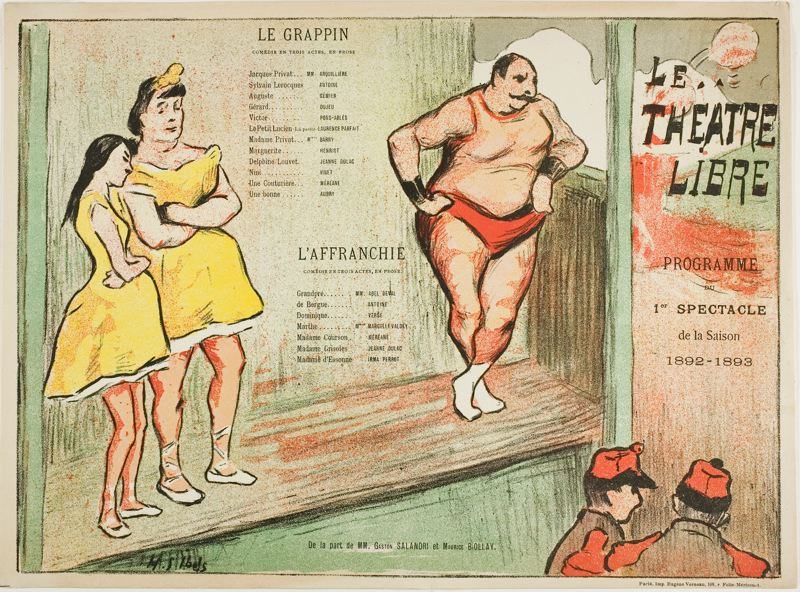
First Performance: Le Grappin, l'Affranchie, for Le Théatre Libre, 1892–93

There are three chapters of the Théâtre Libre's life. This first is its opening with the first two programs in the spring of 1887 and the full season that followed. Antoine quit his job at the gas company to pursue establishing the Théâtre Libre full-time. The second is from October 1888 to June 1893. During this time, the Théâtre Libre established itself as a prominent theatre company whose subscriptions were robust, produced many plays to general critical acclaim, and was sought out to produce new work. It was during these years that the Théâtre Libre saw some of its work transferring to prominent commercial theatres in Paris such as the Odéon and the Comédie-Française. The theatre's final chapter is marked from November 1893 to its close in 1896. During this time it was evident that the experimental days of the theatre had passed as the style and works produced by the Théâtre Libre were now commercially acceptable and sought after. Due to the amount of debt acquired both on behalf of the theatre and personally, Antoine turned the Théâtre Libre over to Larochelle, a son of an older director/actor who had been eager to join management, for the final two years of the theatre's operation. The last performance at Théâtre Libre was on April 27, 1896.

The theatre presented more than 111 plays by more than 50 playwrights during its existence. Each production produced at Théâtre Libre was only given three performances: one dress rehearsal, one opening night performance for invited guests, and one performance for subscribers. However, despite its achievements, the theater had major financial problems. The deep debt coupled with the idea that the Théâtre Libre was no longer needed, as it had proved that a new form of theatre could be acceptable and commercial was being produced, the theatre failed and closed.

== Notable productions ==
The theater concerned itself with producing work that was considered too risky to stage by more well-known theaters, sometimes even works that had been banned in Europe, such as Henrik Ibsen's Ghosts. The theater performed one foreign work per year and it staged only three performances of any production, either a foreign or domestic work.

- Jacques Damour by Émile Zola (adapted for stage by Léon Hennique)
  - The play, focusing on a man fighting against his evil instincts, was well-received by critics.
- The Death of the Duke of Engheim by Léon Hennique
  - This production marked the rebirth of the historical play, but approached the history in a realistic way, a precursor to documentary theater.
- The Kiss by Théodore de Banville
  - This production one of Théâtre Libre's biggest successes critically. The fairy tale was received to standing ovations and very enthusiastic reviews.
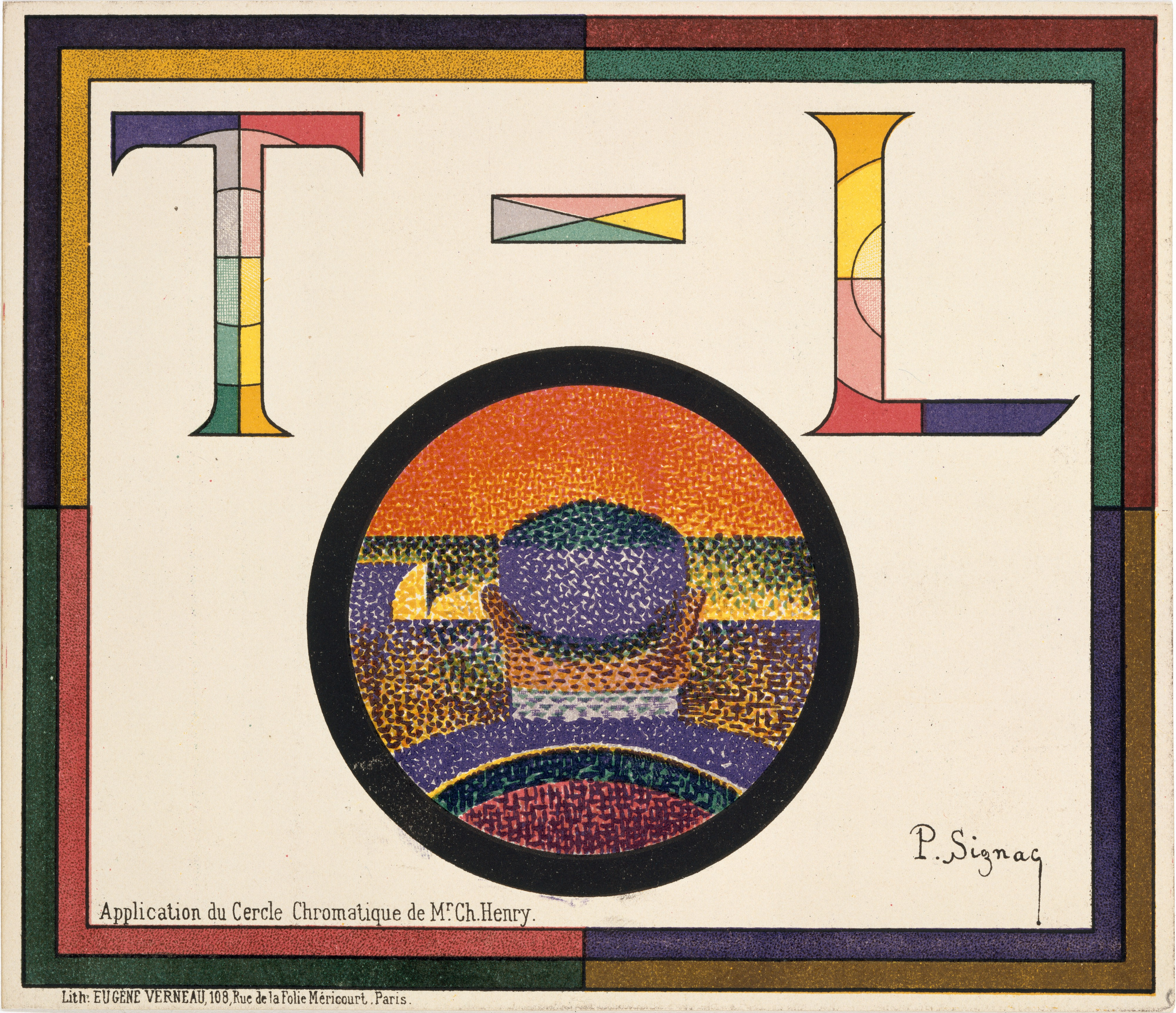
- Paul Signac, Application of Charles Henry's Chromatic Circle; Théâtre-Libre playbill of January 31, 1889.
  Tabarian's Wife by Catulle Mendès
  - Another instant success for Théâtre Libre. The show transferred to the Comédie-Française.
- Lucie Pellegrin's End by Paul Alexis
  - Critics condemned this play and its production stating that the scandalous, realistic portrayal of a homosexual relationship onstage was offensive.
- Christ's Lover by Rodolphe Darzens
  - This mystery play depicting Christ and Mary Magdalene's love affair was deemed sacrilegious and offensive.
- The Power of Darkness by Leo Tolstoy
  - While other thought this play too melancholy for French audiences, Antoine embraced the Russian story.
- Ghosts by Henrik Ibsen
  - While the play had been censored in Norway, Germany, and England due to its taboo subjects such as incest and euthanasia, Antoine produced it to mixed reviews of both critics and friends alike.
- Miss Julie by August Strindberg
  - Banned in Denmark

== Influence ==
The Théâtre Libre combined Realism with Naturalism, and emphasized ensemble acting. André Antoine, its primary director, became known as the father of Naturalistic Staging. He sought to make every play as real as possible, such as when real beef carcasses were used on stage. Many sets were erected with four standing walls for rehearsals, then Antoine would decide which wall to remove for the audience to see when plays began their run. He also replaced footlights with more naturalistic lighting. Antoine believed each play should have its own unique environment.

The Théâtre Libre was the first of its kind and inspired the opening many theatres, including the Freie Bühne, (Free Stage), in Berlin that opened in 1889 as well as the Independent Theatre Society in London that opened in 1891. Out of these two theatres grew Freie Volksbühne, (Free People's Stage), and the Stage Society in 1899 and the Abbey Theatre at Dublin in 1901.

The influence in staging in realism and naturalism can of the Théâtre Libre can be seen in the Moscow Art Theatre which was founded in 1898 by Constantine Stanislavski and Nemirovich-Danchecko and still operates today.
