= St. John Emile Clavering Hankin =

English writer

St John Hankin
- Born: 25 September 1869; Southampton, England
- Died: 15 June 1909 (aged 39)
- Occupation: Playwright
- Writing career
- Genre: plays

St. John Emile Clavering Hankin (25 September 1869 – 15 June 1909) was an English Edwardian essayist and playwright. Along with George Bernard Shaw, John Galsworthy, and Harley Granville-Barker, he was a major exponent of Edwardian "New Drama". Despite success as a playwright he died by his own hand, and his work was largely neglected until the 1990s.

== Early years ==
Hankin was born in Southampton, England. During Hankin's youth, his father suffered a nervous breakdown and became an invalid.

Hankin attended Malvern College and then Merton College, Oxford. Following his graduation in 1890, he became a journalist in London for the Saturday Review. In 1894 he moved to Calcutta and wrote for the India Daily News, but he returned to England the next year after contracting malaria.

Hankin became a drama critic for The Times. He also contributed a series of comic "sequels" to famous plays, including Ibsen's A Doll's House, to Punch. These were published in book form as Mr. Punch's Dramatic Sequels (1901) and Lost Masterpieces (1904).

In 1901 Hankin married Florence Routledge, the daughter of publisher George Routledge.

== Career as a dramatist ==
Hankin's admiration of the work of George Bernard Shaw led him to associate himself with the Stage Society and the Royal Court Theatre. Both groups were supportive of attempts to break loose from the conventionalities of the day. Hankin was actively involved in running the Stage Society, a London theater group that was founded in part to avoid the Lord Chamberlain's censorship.

Hankin's first play, The Two Mr. Wetherbys, was produced by the Stage Society in 1903, and was followed by The Return of the Prodigal (Court Theatre, 1905), The Charity that Began at Home (Court Theatre, 1906), The Cassilis Engagement (Stage Society, 1907) and The Last of the De Mullins (Stage Society, 1908). Hankin also wrote two one-act pieces, The Burglar Who Failed, performed in 1908, and The Constant Lover, first performed posthumously in February 1912. Unlike most comedies, his plays generally end on a note of discord.

Hankin's plays never transferred to the West End, but they received regional productions, particularly at the Birmingham Rep. His plays were little performed after his death, the most notable exception being a 1948 revival of The Return of the Prodigal at the Globe (now Gielgud) Theatre featuring John Gielgud and Sybil Thorndike, with costumes by Cecil Beaton.

Hankin wrote a series of essays from 1906 to 1908 criticizing the established theatrical system of his day. His published writings have been out of copyright since 1960.

== Final years ==
From 1907 Hankin suffered increasing ill health, and he was plagued with the fear that he would suffer the same fate as his father. On a "dull, sultry, wet" June day in 1909, Hankin tied two seven-pound dumbbells around his neck and drowned himself in the River Ithon. He left his wife a letter expressing his fear that he would "slip into invalidism," which he could not bear, and ended by telling her, "I have found a lovely pool in a river and at the bottom I hope to find rest."

== Assessments of his work ==
Bernard Shaw described Hankin's death as "a public calamity." Granville-Barker dedicated his first published volume of plays in 1909 "To the memory of my fellow-worker, St. John Hankin."

When The Dramatic Works of St John Hankin was published in 1912, The New York Times wrote that, "His influence is not to be measured by the fact that the London stage has apparently found no use for him....To have let a little light and air into the English theater at a time when the windows had for years been shut, and the blinds drawn was no mean accomplishment."

Hankin's comedy-dramas satirize snobbery and class-consciousness. His characters include types familiar to the Edwardian New Drama: autocratic men, crushed wives, spinster daughters, formidable dowagers. All feature conflict between parents, particularly domineering fathers, and their lively adult children who repudiate the values and conventions to which their parents hold. Though Hankin attacked abuses, he suggested no remedies. Consequently, it was said that "his plays, shot through with a cynical pessimism, made even Ibsen seem good-natured."

One may see Hankin as a successor of Oscar Wilde, whose comedies deconstructed prevailing Edwardian norms without offering any new values. Wilde criticised the traditional order, but his endings confirm rather than subvert its structures. Christopher Newton makes the argument that Hankin was the comic bridge between Wilde and Noël Coward.

== Revivals since 1993 ==
- 1993 The Return of the Prodigal - The Orange Tree Theatre, London
- 1994 The Return of the Prodigal - BBC Radio Four
- 2001 The Return of the Prodigal - The Shaw Festival, Canada
- 2002 The Charity that Began at Home - The Mint Theater, New York
- 2007 The Return of the Prodigal - The Mint Theater, New York
- 2007 The Cassilis Engagement - The Shaw Festival, Canada
- 2010 The Cassilis Engagement - Act Inc., Clayton, Mo.
- 2011/12 The Charity that Began at Home - The Orange Tree Theatre, London
- 2014 The Charity that Began at Home The Shaw Festival, Canada

In 2015 'The Last of the De Mullins' was staged for the first time publicly at the Jermyn Street Theatre in London, England.

== Works by St. John Hankin ==
=== Plays ===
- The Two Mr Wetherbys, 1903
- The Return of the Prodigal, 1905
- The Charity that Began at Home, 1906
- The Cassilis Engagement, 1907
- The Last of the De Mullins, 1908
- The Burglar Who Failed, 1908
- The Three Daughters of M. Dupont, (Translation of play by Eugene Brieux, in "Three Plays by Brieux" first published 1911)
- The Constant Lover, first performed 1912
- Thompson, (Posthumously completed by George Calderon, first published 1913)
- A Pleasant Evening, (Unperformed; first published 2005)

=== Books ===
- Mr Punch's Dramatic Sequels, 1901
- Lost Masterpieces, 1904
- Three Plays with Happy Endings, 1907 (The Return of the Prodigal, The Charity that Began at Home and The Cassilis Engagement)

=== Essays ===
- "The Censorship of Plays". Academy 74 (29 February 1908): 514-515
- "Puritanism and the English Stage". Fortnightly Review 86 (1 December 1906): 1055-1064
- "How to Run an Art Theatre for London". Fortnightly Review 88 (1 November 1907): 814-818
- "The Need for an Endowed Theatre in London". Fortnightly Review (1 December 1908): 1038-1047.
