= The Valley of Lost Hope =

1915 American film

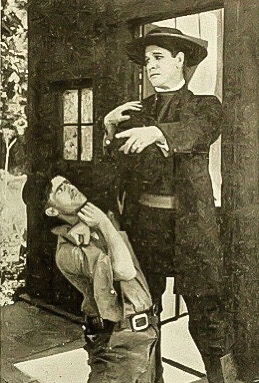
- Film still of Pastor Royce (Romaine Fielding) overpowering villain Dick Flint (Robin Williamson)
- Directed by: Romaine Fielding
- Screenplay by: Shannon Fife
- Produced by: Siegmund Lubin
- Starring: Romaine Fielding; Peter Lang; Mildred Gregory; B. K. Roberts
- Production company: Lubin Manufacturing Company
- Distributed by: V-L-S-E, Inc.
- Release dates: July 5, 1915 (limited distribution); October 11, 1915 (re-released)
- Running time: 5 reels (approximately 70 minutes) (Note: According to the reference How Movies Work by Bruce F. Kawin (New York: Macmillan Publishing Company, 1987, pp. 46-47), a full 1000-foot reel of film in the silent era had a maximum running time of 15 minutes. While silent-film speeds varied, they were generally projected at 16 frames per second, much slower than the 24 frames of later sound films. Also, most reels, especially the final reels in multiple-reel releases, were not filled to their maximum capacities.)
- Country: United States
- Languages: Silent, English intertitles

The Valley of Lost Hope is a lost 1915 American silent Western drama film directed by and starring Romaine Fielding. Produced by Lubin Manufacturing Company and written by Shannon Fife, the film portrayed the rise and destruction of a gold-mining "boomtown" created by a phony real-estate business. Other cast members included Peter Lang, Mildred Gregory, and B. K. Roberts in principal roles. The production was filmed on location in Philipsburg in central Pennsylvania and at Lubin's backlot and studio facilities in Betzwood, located approximately 20 miles northwest of Philadelphia.

The Library of Congress includes the film among the National Film Preservation Board's updated 2019 list of "7,200 Lost U.S. Silent Feature Films" produced between 1912 and 1929.

== Plot ==
This lost film's storyline was set in the Western region of the United States in the late nineteenth century. (Note: No available reviews or film descriptions in 1914-1915 trade publications and newspapers cite a timeframe for the story, but references to "prairie schooners" (covered wagons) and the style of the antiquated locomotives in surviving train-wreck footage set the plot within the final decades of the nineteenth century.) Production reports and reviews published in trade publications and newspapers in the final weeks of 1914 and during 1915, describe it portraying the schemes of a "get-rich-quick" confidence man named James Ewing (Peter Lang). He, assisted by two promoters, poses as a real estate broker who circulates false reports of rich gold deposits in a barren, deserted valley. To enhance his lies, Ewing places small amounts of gold on the land that he and his associates had purchased, "salting" some rocks on the property with flecks of the precious metal. He then lures people to buy parcels of the worthless land at inflated prices. Many men and women are duped by Ewing's sales pitches, and a "boomtown" rises in the valley as more speculators and gold prospectors rush into the area, along with saloonkeepers, gamblers, grocers, and other merchants who hope to profit off the outbreak of gold fever.

Ewing's son Bob (B. K. Roberts), just out of college, now arrives and soon falls in love with Dora (Mildred Gregory), unaware that she is married but separated from her frequently drunk and abusive husband, Dick Flint (Robin Williamson). Dora is also the sister of Roland Royce (Romaine Fielding), the town's influential pastor. After working briefly in his father's real-estate "business", Bob discovers its true purpose. Horrified, he vows to return the money to all the victims of the fraud. The miners and other town residents also learn about the swindle, and they converge on the elder Ewing's private train as it prepares to leave for the East. Meanwhile, Dora's husband Flint and two of his cronies take advantage of the temporary absence of most of the town's population and rob the safe in the gambling hall. Despite the presence of the angry mob, Ewing's train manages to depart and speed away from town. A freight train, however, is rapidly approaching on the same track and minutes later crashes head-on into the escaping passenger train, killing Ewing and his accomplices.

Back in town, Flint flees after the gambling-hall robbery is discovered while his fellow thieves are killed. Flint, desperate to get away, creates a diversion by igniting a huge charge of dynamite on the top of the nearby mountain. The ensuing landslide destroys most of the town, covering it under tons of rocks and dirt. Despite the massive explosion, Pastor Royce finds Flint in the cellar of a cabin and kills him in self-defense. Bob now returns with the swindled money he retrieved from the wrecked train and gives it to the miners and others who survived the landslide. Now a widow, Dora agrees to marry Bob. The happy couple, accompanied by Pastor Royce and Bob's newly "adopted" mother, old "Ma" Dean (Minnie Pearson), leave the valley in a "prairie schooner" (covered wagon) to start new lives elsewhere.

== Cast ==
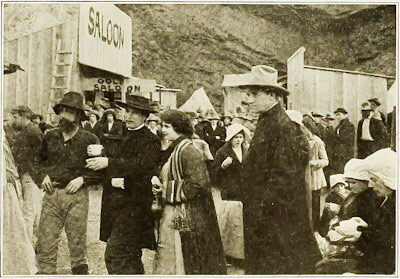
Still of Pastor Royce (Fielding, second left) and his sister Dora (Mildred Gregory) in the boomtown

- Romaine Fielding as Pastor John Royce (Note: In trade reviews in 1915, references to the names of leading characters are sometimes cited differently. Fielding's role as John Royce is identified as "John Dean"; Gregory's role as Dora Royce is "Helen Dean"; and Williamson is "'Snake' Richards". Those variations occur between the film's limited release in early July 1915 and its wider distribution in October that year.)
- Peter Lang as James Ewing
- B. K. Roberts as Bob Ewing
- Mildred Gregory as Dora Royce
- Robin Williamson as Dick Flint
- Minnie Pearson as Granny / Ma Dean
- Bernard Siegel as Undetermined Role

== Production ==
The filming and editing of an early theater cut of the picture were completed during the final quarter of 1914, many months before the five-reeler's initial distribution. To enhance Shannon Fife's screenplay or "scenario", Fielding organized two major action sequences during production: the collision of two trains and an immense mountain explosion with a landslide. The "'train smash'" footage used in The Valley of Hope was actually shot on location near Philipsburg in central Pennsylvania in September 1914, 10 months before the film's release. The noted explosion, additional outdoor scenes, and interior shots were done at Lubin's studio facilities and backlot at Betzwood.

=== "Boomtown" set ===
The centerpiece of the film's plot was a gold-mining boomtown, an elaborate set built at Betzwood and populated during production by hundreds of extras, including many genuine Pennsylvania miners who were brought to Lubin's facilities. Instead of just filming scenes on a completed set, Fielding's cameramen shot daily footage of Lubin carpenters as they erected the town. That footage of buildings in various phases of construction was then edited into the photoplay. That filming strategy did not go unnoticed by film critics and reporters. After seeing an early cut of the film in December 1914, Stephen Bush—the reviewer for the trade weekly The Moving Picture World—shared his reactions to the use of the construction footage:

One of the prettiest scenes I have ever seen in any moving picture play was the visualization of the birth and growth of a "boom town" upon the discovery of gold. The rush of settlers, the eagerness to build, the rise of a miniature city in almost a few hours, are portrayed with a skill very far above the average. It is literally true that we see the town grow from the putting down of the first rough lumber to the completion of the saloon and post office.

In the January 10, 1915 issue of The Chicago Daily Tribune, the newspaper's "Movie Land" reporter, following a preview of the film, also compliments Fielding's portrayal of the set's construction "during the action of the play" itself and for "showing how mushroom towns spring up during a 'strike gold quick' craze."

=== Train wreck ===
Footage of trains colliding in 1914 survives in a chapter of the Lubin serial The Beloved Adventurer; later footage filmed specifically for The Valley of Lost Hope is classified as lost.

On Tuesday, September 8, 1914, Fielding staged and directed the filming of a head-on collision of a three-car passenger train with a seven-car freight train along the 15-mile Altoona and Philipsburg branch of the Pittsburgh and Susquehanna Railroad. The trains, each traveling approximately 35-miles-an-hour, collided at the rail location nicknamed "Alley Popper". Fielding, not missing an opportunity for free publicity, scheduled the crash to coincide with a "mammoth Labor Day picnic" held outside Philipsburg and attended by an estimated crowd of 10,000 spectators.

Siegmund Lubin reportedly spent over $25,000—a monstrous sum in 1914 for a single action sequence—to purchase two old coal-fired locomotives, the needed freight and passenger cars, and to stage the spectacle. Despite the expense, Lubin justified it as an investment, for the studio later used the same wreck footage in at least four other productions. (Note: Other Lubin releases known to include footage of the same train wreck are A Partner to Providence (1914), The Road O' Strife (1915), Gods of Fate (1916), and The Hour of Disaster (1916).) Fielding deployed 30 cameramen with 12 different cameras to film the collision, minimizing the chances of losing optimal footage of the one-take event due to either malfunctioning equipment or other factors. No one was aboard the trains except two "experienced railroad engineers" hired by the director, who instructed them to jump off their respective trains "a minute before the impact". Following the crash, Fielding also filmed needed passenger-rescue scenes around the smoking wreckage.

=== Mountain explosion ===
In addition to staging the dramatic train wreck, Fielding organized and filmed a huge dynamite explosion and landslide as part of the production's concluding scenes. That action sequence was not, though, staged near Philipsburg; it was filmed on "a portion of rock cliff" located on the sprawling backlot at Betzwood. The Chicago Daily Tribune reported that "over a ton of dynamite was distributed from the base to the top of the mountain". As with his staging of the trains' collision, Fielding deployed a dozen cameras to capture another one-take opportunity. It was reported that four of those cameras were "driven by motors" and that the blast and landslide were "spectacular in the extreme".

== Promotion and release ==
The film's copyright registration (LP5649) and release charts published in period trade publications indicate that the feature was originally prepared for release in December 1914 as a four-reeler. That release, however, was postponed and the film's running time was expanded to five reels, likely with intentions to increase the production's box-office potential by lengthening scenes related to its action sequences, which were often called "punches" at studios and in the media during the silent era. Advertisements for the film, descriptions of its content, and reviews began appearing in leading trade publications and newspapers by mid-December 1914 and early 1915, over seven months prior to the picture's initial distribution. In its January 10, 1915 issue, the Chicago Daily Tribune highlights for its readers the "forthcoming" film's action scenes:

How're these for "punches"? An explosion that tears down the whole side of a mountain, completely burying an entire mountain town under tons of rock and dirt, and the headon collision of two trains are two of the sensational features of the forthcoming drama, "The Valley of Lost Hope", written by Shannon Fife and produced by Romaine Fielding of the Lubin staff of directors.

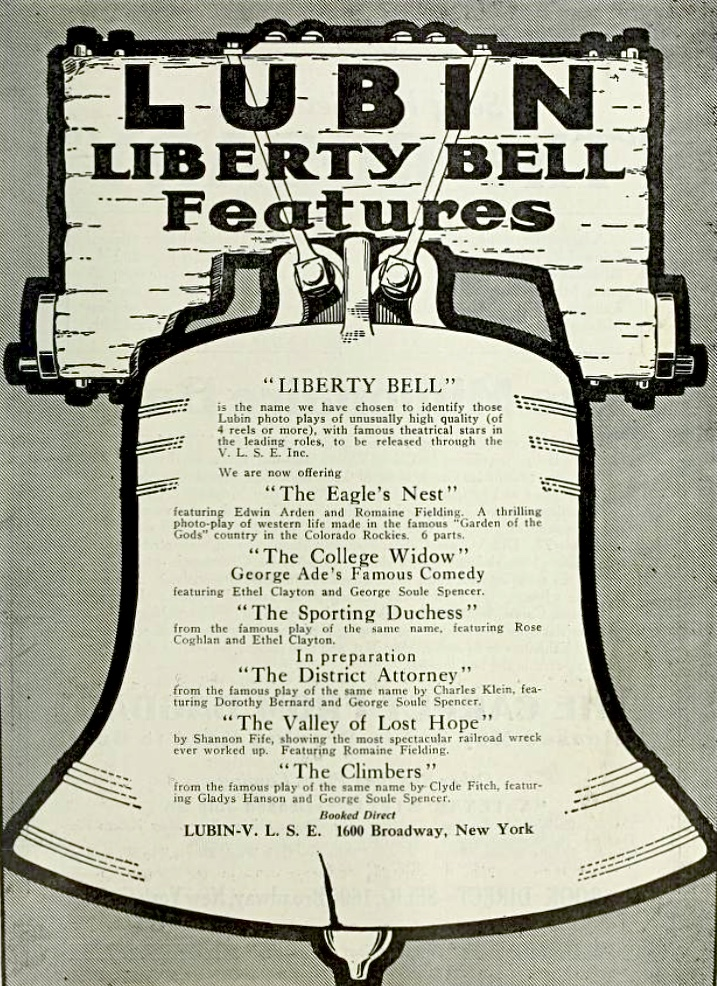
Advertisement for Lubin films, including The Valley of Lost Hope, in Motion Picture News, June 1915

For the next three months, promotion of the film with no given release date continued. Finally, by the first of May several major trade publications announced "the week of July 5"; nevertheless, even in its June issue the movie-fan monthly Motion Picture Magazine still advertised the film's length being in "4 Parts", as being a four-reeler rather than a five-reeler. Limited screenings of the drama did begin in some theaters in larger cities in early July, but a wider distribution of the film did not commence for another three months, until October 11. The principal reason for the film's delayed and then staggered release was due to scheduling adustments associated with Lubin Manufacturing Company's new distribution partnership with three other film studios: Vitagraph, Selig, and Essanay. Under the incorporated title "V-L-S-E", the companies in 1915 began coordinating their marketing schedules and release dates. In addition, Lubin's financial circumstances and production calendars had been seriously affected by a disastrous fire in June 1914, a blaze that destroyed millions of feet of film in the company's main storage vault in Philadelphia. Those losses—all of which were uninsured—included a huge collection of original prints, master negatives of past projects, supplies of stock footage and "raw" film, as well as "several features ready for release".

== Reception ==
Two days before the film's limited release in July 1915, Motography described it as an "elaborate, spectacular drama" and predicted it would "strongly appeal to all classes of audiences". The feature received mostly positive reactions from critics, although it did have some detractors. As anticipated by Lubin, the reviewers' greatest attention was given to the production's two most dramatic sequences. Later, on October 23, after the film's second, wider release, Thomas C. Kennedy of Motography assesses it in greater detail and praises the scenes that "compel one's attention":

The train wreck is wonderful. The two locomotives come head-on at considerable speed and when they collide the coaches are hurled into the air. This is a sight that will be long remembered by those who see "The Valley of Lost Hope." It is certain to bring a murmur of surprise from everyone. The explosion which destroys the mining camp is another remarkable scene. Effective staging and the work of capable cast make the picture a worthy addition to the V.L.S.E. program.

In her review for Motion Picture News, Irene Page Solomon praises the film as "a smashing play" with ”force in its plot" and "strength in its characters". Solomon was impressed as well by the train wreck, although she found Fielding's direction of camera work and his editing decisions for the mountain explosion even more effective, especially in one instance, recounting how "a little baby cooing in the midst of the landslide and finally coming out unharmed, relieves the tenseness of the big scene and touches the hearts of the spectators."

Joshua Lowe, one of the critics for the entertainment paper Variety, was also captivated by the film's "'big' scenes", including its "dynamite explosion of no mean proportions". He, though, judged the photoplay's overall plot to be inconsistent and "too long-drawn out" with the first part of its story having "no apparent bearing upon the remainder of the narrative". "As a sensational feature", writes Lowe in his October 23 review, "it misses fire."

== "Lost" status of the film ==
No full prints or any one of this Lubin production's five reels are preserved in the Library of Congress, the UCLA Film Archives, in the collection of moving images at the Museum of Modern Art, the George Eastman Museum, or in European film repositories. In its 2019 list of lost feature films released in the United States between 1912 and 1929, the Library of Congress includes The Valley of Lost Hope. Film stills published in 1915 trade journals, such as those depicted on this page, provide at least a basic visual record of the content of a few scenes in the production. Some brief footage of the noted train wreck does exist in another film, in a surviving copy of "A Partner to Providence", which is episode or "chapter" 8 of The Beloved Adventurer, a Lubin serial released in the final months of 1914. The original print of that chapter is preserved in the Motion Picture Division of the Library of Congress.

== See also ==
- List of lost films
