= Alice Grein =

English actress, playwright and theatrical producer (1874 - 1944)

- Born: Alix Augusta Greveen; 1874; Camberwell, England, UK
- Died: 1944; Kensington, England, UK
- Occupations: Actress; playwright; translator; theatre producer
- Known for: Actress with independent Theatre Society
- Spouse: J.T. Grein (m 1904-)

Alice Augusta Grein, nee Graveen (1874-1944) was an English actress, playwright, translator and theatrical producer, who wrote under the pseudonym Michael Orme and as Alix Graveen.

== Life ==
Alix Augusta Greveen was born in Camberwell in 1874, the daughter of German-born parents Maria and Ernst Graveen, a silk merchant. She became an actress with J. T. Grein's' Independent Theatre Society, and in 1904 married Grein.

As well as writing and producing plays, she continued to act. In 1913 she played Mother Wolff in a production of Gerhart Hauptmann's Der Biberpelz at the Queen's Theatre. In 1917 she appeared in the London Repertory's performance of Elizabeth Baker's play Partnership.

She died in Kensington, England in 1944.

== Works ==
=== Plays ===
- (as A. Greveen, with J. T. Grein) A Happy Nook, 1901. Translated from a German play Das Glück im Winkel (1896) by Hermann Sudermann.
- (as Michael Orme) Those Who Sit in Judgement, 1904.
- (as Miss Alix Greveen) Renaissance, 1905. Translated from a German play Renaissance (1897) by Franz von Schönthan and Franz Koppel-Ellfeld.
- (as Michael Orme) La Pompadour, 1911.
- (as Michael Orme) Wedding Bells, 1911.
- (as Michael Orme) The Widow and the Waiter, 1915.
- (as M. Orme) The Eternal Snows, 1916)
- (as Mrs Grein) The Hotel de Waterloo, 1916.
- (as Michael Orme) The Woman at the Windowsill, 1917.
- (as Michael Orme) Cavalleria Rusticana, 1919. From an Italian play Cavalleria Rusticana (1884) by Giovanni Verga.
- (as Michael Orme) Great Aunt Elizabeth, 1919. Originally titled Crinolines and Khaki.
- (as Michael Orme) The Doctor of Dreams, 1921. From a Dutch play Femina (1919) by F. J. Soesman and Cornelis Petrus van Rossem.
- (as Michael Orme) Life's A Game, 1922.
- (as Michael Orme) The Greatest Invention of All, 1922.

=== Biography ===
- J. T. Grein: the story of a pioneer, 1862-1935. 1936.
