= J. H. Ryley =

English singer and actor (1841–1922)

J. H. Ryley in 1897

John Handford Ryley (11 September 1841 – 28 July 1922) was an English singer and actor, best known for his performances in the comic baritone roles of the Savoy Operas with the D'Oyly Carte Opera Company, particularly in America. His second wife was D'Oyly Carte performer, actress and playwright Madeleine Lucette Ryley.

== Early life and career ==
Ryley was born in 1841 in London, the son of John Riley, a solicitor’s clerk from London, and his wife Elizabeth (née Perry). By February 1863 Ryley was singing comic songs at Deacon’s Music Hall, Sadler's Wells Theatre, Price’s Music Hall and then at the Bedford Music Hall in Camden Town as "the comical comique". He married the actress Marie Barnam in 1864, and they had a daughter, Wallis Marie (b. 1866). The couple performed a comic duet and dance act in London and on tour, and they were engaged at the Gaiety Theatre, London in 1872. A New York critic later claimed that their "Dancing Quakers" routine was parodied by Margaret and Despard in Gilbert and Sullivan's 1887 opera Ruddigore. Ryley also appeared at The Gaiety in a musical play, Ali Baba a la Mode, in 1872. He and Barnam soon separated. In 1875, Ryley played Fernando in the comic opera Cattarina by Robert Reece and Frederic Clay at the Charing Cross Theatre and later on tour. In Manchester in 1876, he played Captain Flint in The Sultan of Mocha by Alfred Cellier. Later that year, he created the role of Zapeter in W. S. Gilbert and Clay's Princess Toto at the Theatre Royal in Nottingham and on tour in the provinces and next played Amen Squeak in Nell Gwynne by Cellier at Prince's Theatre in Manchester.

Ryley as Ko Ko in The Mikado in New York (1885)

Ryley joined Richard D'Oyly Carte's Comedy-Opera Company Ltd. in 1878, appearing as John Wellington Wells in the first provincial production of The Sorcerer, and the Learned Judge in Trial by Jury on the same bill. In September 1878, the company gave the first provincial tour of H.M.S. Pinafore, with Ryley as Sir Joseph Porter. In October the company added Congenial Souls, a one-act farce written by Ryley using music by Jacques Offenbach, to the program as a curtain raiser. This appears to be the only play written by Ryley. Madeleine Lucette (1858–1934) appeared together with Riley on tour with the D'Oyly Carte company in 1878, and she played Clara in his curtain raiser, while he played Adolphus. In 1879, Ryley was chosen to play Sir Joseph in the first authentic American production of Pinafore at New York City's Fifth Avenue Theatre, which opened on 1 December 1879. On 31 December of that year, in the same theatre, he created the role of Major General Stanley in The Pirates of Penzance and continued with the role in the US tour until June 1880. Over the next several years, Ryley and the much younger Lucette both performed in America, sometimes together, over the next several years, behaving as if married, and eventually lived in New Rochelle, New York, together with his daughter Wallace. They were not legally married until 1890, however, after Ryley finalised his divorce from his first wife.

Ryley appeared in leading roles in all of the New York productions of the D'Oyly Carte Opera Company until 1883. He was Captain Felix Flapper in Billee Taylor (1881), Reginald Bunthorne in Patience (1881–82), Blood Red Bill in Edward Solomon's Claude Duval (1882), Philip of Aragon and Don Jose de Mantilla Les Manteaux Noirs (1882), Peter van Dunk in Rip Van Winkle (1882, with Selina Dolaro), and the Lord Chancellor in Iolanthe and Mr. Cox in Cox and Box (1882–83). He continued to appear in major Gilbert and Sullivan productions in America after leaving the company. In 1884, he played King Gama in New York's first production of Princess Ida at the Fifth Avenue Theatre and also starred in Falka at the Casino Theatre. In 1885, he played Ko-Ko in The Mikado at the Standard Theatre in New York and then in Chicago.

Ryley in Iolanthe as the Lord Chancellor in 1887

== Later years ==
In 1887, Ryley starred in Gasparone by Karl Millöcker in New York City at the Standard Theatre, together with Lillian Russell and Eugene Oudin. He also appeared with Russell in a tour that included Iolanthe (as Lord Chancellor, 1887), and was Jack Point in The Yeomen of the Guard in Boston, Massachusetts in February 1889. Ryley continued to appear in New York and on tour in America during most of the 1890s.

He and his wife returned to England, where he appeared in London on several occasions between 1900 and 1913. Among his London roles were Kit Barniger in Mice and Men (1902 at the Lyric Theatre, leased by William Greet) and Josh Harmony in Mrs. Grundy (Scala Theatre, 1905), both plays by his wife who had become a successful playwright by the mid-1890s in both New York and London. Ryley was involved in the production of many of his wife's plays and often directed them. The couple also travelled extensively.

Ryley made two films later in his career, first as the Gravedigger in a 1913 silent film version of Hamlet, starring his good friend Johnston Forbes-Robertson. His other film credit was the 1916 mystery, Who Killed Simon Baird?.

Ryley died at the age of 81 in Edgware, Middlesex, survived by Lucette.
