= An American Citizen =

1914 film

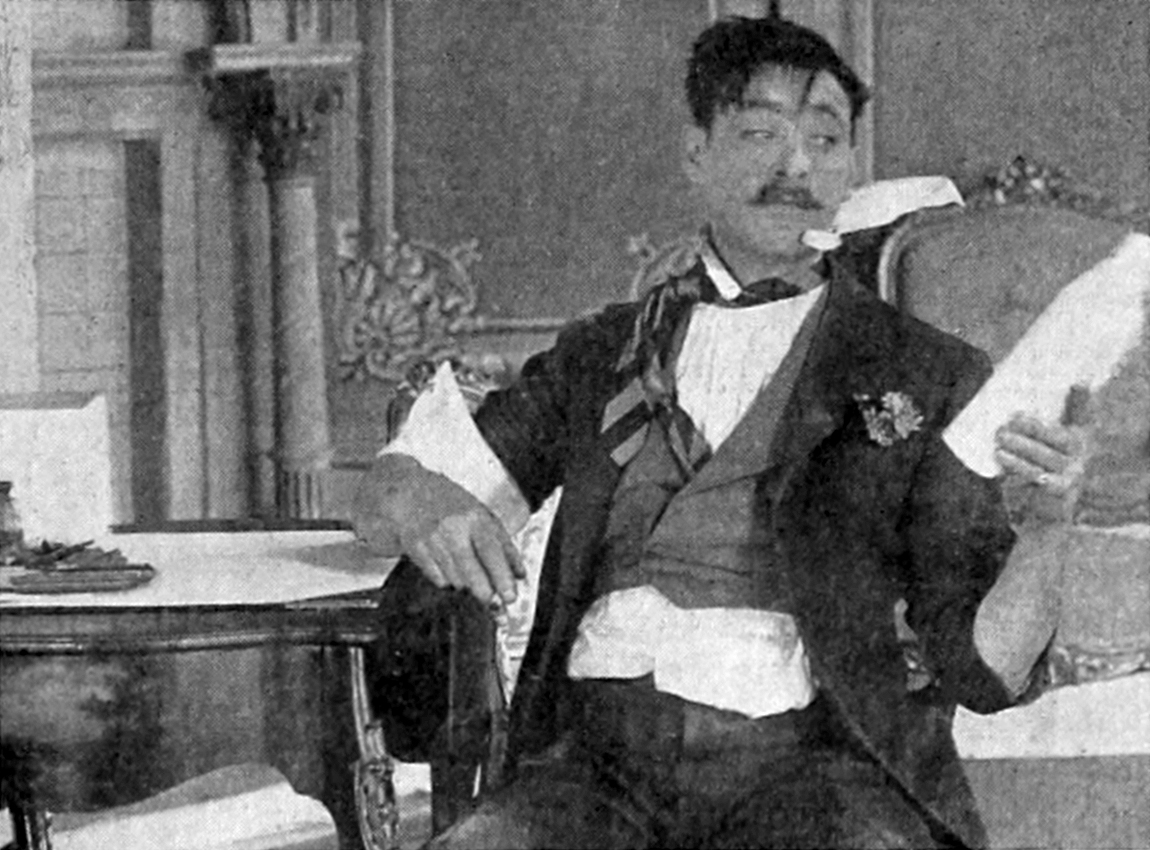
- John Barrymore in An American Citizen
- Directed by: J. Searle Dawley
- Based on: An American Citizen by Madeleine Lucette Ryley
- Produced by: Adolph Zukor; Daniel Frohman
- Starring: John Barrymore
- Distributed by: Famous Players Film Company
- Release date: January 14, 1914 (United States)
- Running time: 4 reels
- Country: United States
- Language: Silent (English intertitles)

An American Citizen is a 1914 American silent romantic comedy film directed by J. Searle Dawley. The film is noteworthy as the feature film debut of John Barrymore. Distributed by Famous Players Film Company, the film is based on the 1897 Broadway play of the same name by Madeleine Lucette Ryley. The film is now presumed lost.

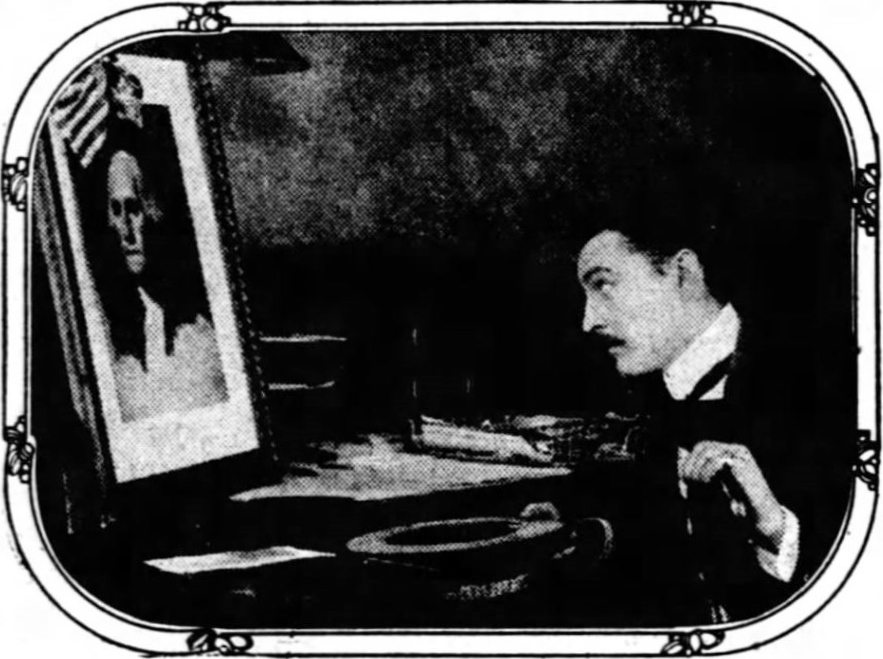
John Barrymore in An American Citizen

== Cast ==
- John Barrymore - Beresford Kruger
- Evelyn Moore - Beatrice Carewe
- Peter Lang - Peter Barbury
- Hal Clarendon - Egerton Brown
- Mrs. M.S. Smith - Carola Chapin
- Ethel West - Georgia Chapin
- Howard Missimer - Sir Humphrey Bunn
- Edith Henkle - Lady Bunn
- Alexander Gaden - Otto Storbie
- Wellington A. Playter - Valet
- Joe Short - Office Boy
- Ernest Truex - Mercury
- Alexandru Haidau

== See also ==
- List of Paramount Pictures films
- John Barrymore filmography
