= Peter Lang (actor) =

American actor

- Born: 1859
- Died: August 20, 1932 (aged 72–73)
- Occupation: Actor

Peter Lang (1859 – August 20, 1932) was an American actor. He played in many silent films, including An American Citizen and The Valley of Lost Hope.

== Filmography ==
- The Port of Doom (1913)
- A Lady of Quality (1913)
- An American Citizen (1914)
- The Valley of Lost Hope (1915)
- The College Widow (1915)
- The Great Ruby (1915)
- The Evangelist (1916)
- The Dawn of Love (1916)
- The Auction Block (1917)
- The Harvest Moon (1920)
- Dangerous Money (1924)
