= Alice Burville =

English soprano and actress

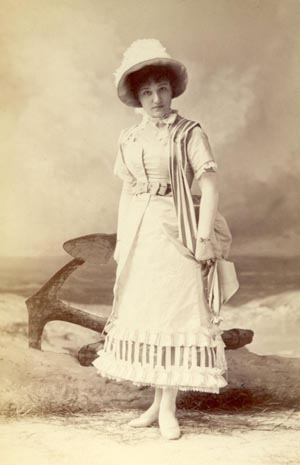
Burville as Arabella in Billee Taylor

Alice Julia Burville (11 July 1856 – 4 July 1944) was an English soprano and actress, best known for her performances in Gilbert and Sullivan operas and other operettas in the 1870s and 1880s.

Beginning her West End career by 1874, Burville played leading roles in a variety of operettas. She also toured in Britain and America, appearing there with Lydia Thompson's troupe in 1877. She performed frequently with Richard D'Oyly Carte's companies, joining his Comedy-Opera Company at the Opera Comique in 1878–79 where she played a role in a curtain raiser to H.M.S. Pinafore, while covering the role of Josephine in that opera and playing the role occasionally. After another West End role, Burville toured America with Carte, finally playing Lady Angela in Patience with the D'Oyly Carte Opera Company in the New York and then on tour in 1881–82. Over the next decade, she continued to star in operettas and pantomimes, primarily on tour in Britain.

== Life and career ==
Burville was born in Stepney, London. In August 1874 she appeared in Richard D'Oyly Carte's presentation of Gaston Serpette's operetta, La branche cassée at the Opera Comique. Later that year, she made a success in Ten of 'Em, by Franz von Suppé, at the Theatre Royal, Drury Lane: "Miss Burville sings a charming song (which she gave with such freshness and effect as to secure an enthusiastic encore.)" This was a curtain raiser for the pantomime Aladdin, in which she also appeared. In 1875, she performed in other West End theatres in London as Princess Fleur d'amour in Hervé's Dagobert (1875) and in the title role in Lecocq's Fleur de Thé (1875).

In 1876, Carte transferred his production of The Duke's Daughter, an adaptation of Léon Vasseur's La Timbale d'argent, from the Royalty Theatre to the Globe Theatre, and engaged Burville to join a cast headed by Pauline Rita. In the same year, she appeared for the manager John Hollingshead in an Offenbach operetta, The Song of Fortunio and a burlesque, Young Rip Van Winkle. She then joined Rita on a tour of The Duke's Daughter, managed and conducted by Carte. She next toured with Selina Dolaro, in Offenbach's The Grand Duchess of Gerolstein and The Rose of Auvergne, and Lecocq's La fille de Madame Angot, before finishing the year in pantomime in Birmingham.

In 1877, Burville took over the role of Rosalinde in London's first Die Fledermaus, by Johann Strauss II and Orphee aux Enfers, both at the Alhambra Theatre. She next toured in America with Lydia Thompson's troupe, appearing in Offenbach's Blue Beard and Robinson Crusoé, as well as in Oxygen and Piff-Paff, playing, respectively, Fatima, Polly Hopkins, Suzel and Joconde. She returned to London in January 1878, playing the title-rôle in a revival of Offenbach's Geneviève de Brabant, presented by Carte in a double bill with Arthur Sullivan's Cox and Box. She followed this by playing the Duchess of Parthenay in Carte's production of Lecocq's Le Petit Duc in 1878. At the end of June 1878, Burville joined Carte's Comedy-Opera Company at the Opera Comique playing Lady Viola in the curtain raiser The Spectre Knight, while singing in the chorus and covering the role of Josephine in H.M.S. Pinafore, playing that part periodically in 1878 and 1879. In October 1879, she played Josephine on tour, after which she left the D'Oyly Carte company.

Burville returned to Drury Lane as Clairette in Augustus Harris's production of La fille de Madame Angot in 1880. In 1881, she played Arabella Lane with Carte's American Billee Taylor company and then played Lady Angela in Patience with the D'Oyly Carte Opera Company in the New York cast at the Standard Theatre and on tour in 1881–82. In 1882, Burville returned to London to play Fiametta in Suppé's Boccaccio. After this engagement, she appeared primarily in the provinces, where she appeared in the title role of Merry Mignon, composed by her husband, John Crook. The theatrical newspaper, The Era, called her "the merriest, prettiest, and most vivacious of Merry Mignons". She starred in a new light opera, The Bachelors (1885), and played in pantomimes, including Fee-Fi-Fo-Fum, or Harlequin Jack the Giant Killer in London in 1887. In 1892 she appeared in another of her husband's works, The Young Recruit, presented on tour by Augustus Harris. Her last known appearance was in Geneviève de Brabant in Leicester in December 1893.

Burville was married for a brief time, beginning in 1876, to W. H. Denny, and then to the conductor-composer John Francis Crook (1847–1922), a friend of Alfred Cellier's. She survived Crook by more than two decades and died in Littlehampton, England, at age 87. Burville and Crook are buried in the West Norwood Cemetery.
