= Widowers' Houses =

Play by George Bernard Shaw

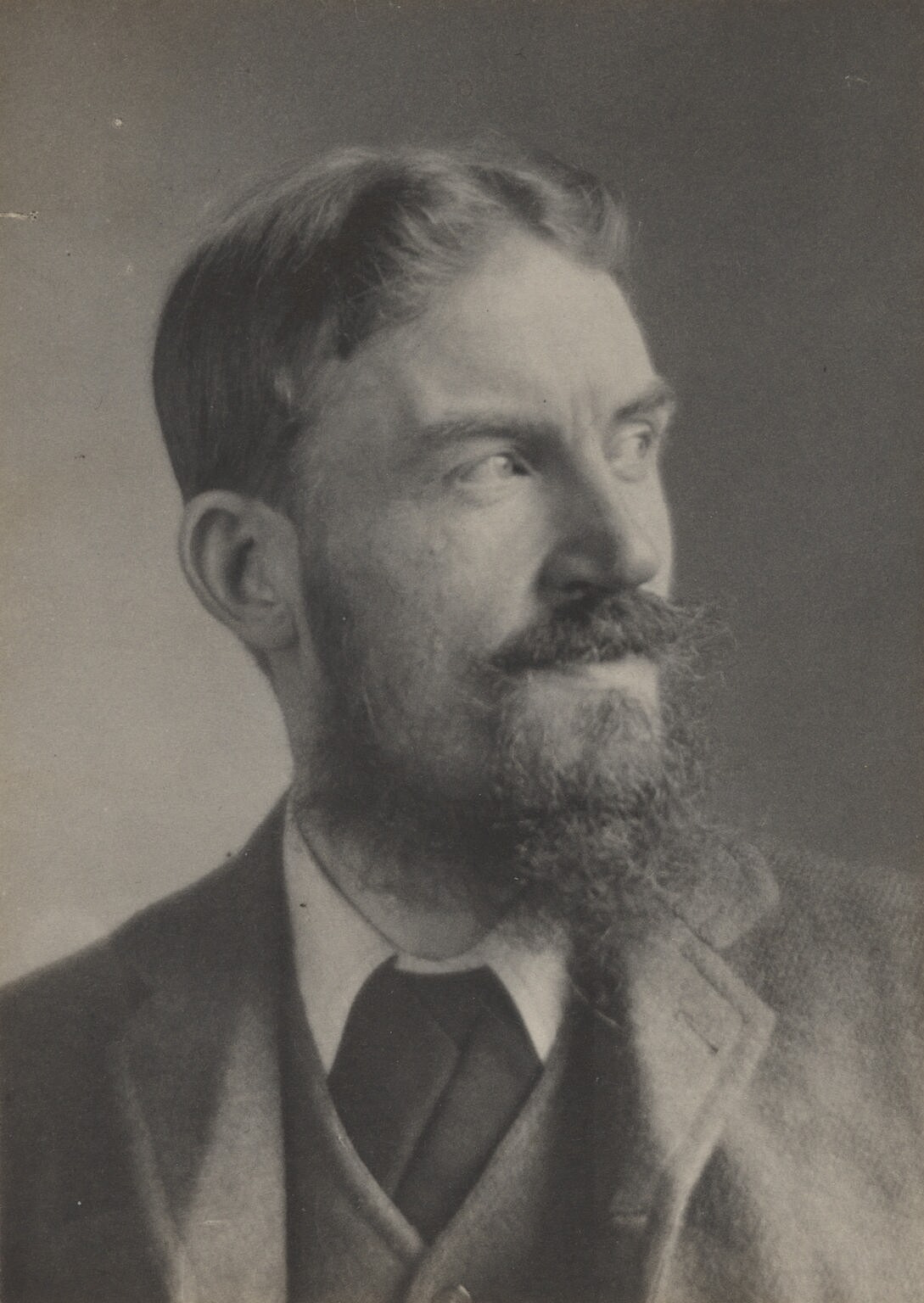
- Original language: English
- Written by: George Bernard Shaw
- Subject: An idealistic doctor finds his principles compromised
- Genre: "Plays Unpleasant"
- Setting: various

Premiere
- Date: 9 December 1892, Independent Theatre Society,
- Place: Royalty Theatre

Widowers' Houses (1892) was the first play by George Bernard Shaw to be staged. It premièred on 9 December 1892 at the Royalty Theatre, under the auspices of the Independent Theatre Society — a subscription club, formed to escape the Lord Chamberlain's Office censorship.

== Characters and original cast ==
- Harry Trench – W. J. Robertson
- William de Burgh Cokane – Arthur Whittaker
- Mr Sartorius – T. W. Percyval
- Lickcheese – James Welch
- Waiter – E. P. Donne
- Porter – William Alison
- Blanche – Florence Farr
- The Parlor Maid – N. de Silva

== Plot ==
The play comprises three acts:

In Act I a poor but aristocratic young doctor named Harry Trench and his friend William Cokane are holidaying at Remagen on the Rhine. They encounter fellow travellers Mr Sartorius, a self-made businessman, and his daughter Blanche. Harry and Blanche fall in love and become engaged.

Act II opens with everyone back at home in London. Sartorius, in talking to Mr Lickcheese, whom he employs as a rent-collector, reveals himself to be a slum landlord. He dismisses Lickcheese for dealing too leniently with tenants. Trench and Cokane arrive to visit, but when Trench discovers that Sartorius makes his money by renting slum housing to the poor, he is disgusted and refuses to allow Blanche to accept money from her father after they are married, insisting that they must live instead on Harry's small income. Following a bitter argument, they break up. Sartorius reveals that Trench's income depends on interest from mortgaged tenements, and is therefore as "dirty" as his own; but the lovers do not reconcile. Blanche utterly rejects Harry because of her wounded feelings.

In Act III, Trench, Cokane and Lickcheese return to Sartorius' house to plan a shady business venture. Trench, disillusioned and coarsened by knowing his income is tainted by its source, no longer takes the moral high ground. In the final scene, notable for its erotic tension, Harry and Blanche reunite.

== Creation and publication ==
The play had originally been written in 1885 as a collaboration with William Archer, who took inspiration from the comedy Ceinture dorée (1855) by the French dramatist Émile Augier; but the two fell out and this first attempt was abandoned. Shaw reorganised his fragments, and added a third act for the production, at the invitation of Jakub Grein.

The name of the play comes from the Bible. Bernard Shaw wrote 17.11.1905 his first German translator Siegfried Trebitsch: "Get a Bible and look at Ev. Matthae XXIII, 14. "Weh euch, die Schriftgelehrte und Pharisäer, ihr Heuchler, die ihr der Witwen Hauser presset…" [Woe unto you, scribes and Pharisees, hypocrites! For ye devour widows’houses…] The play should be called „Witwen Hauser" or „Weh euch, ihr Heuchler", or something else out of the Bible. "

This is one of three plays Shaw published as Plays Unpleasant in 1898. They were termed "unpleasant" because they were intended, not to entertain their audiences – as traditional Victorian theatre was expected to – but to raise awareness of social problems and to censure exploitation of the labouring class by the unproductive rich. The other plays in the group are The Philanderer and Mrs. Warren's Profession.

== Production history ==
The play was first performed at the Royalty Theatre by the Independent Theatre Society on 9 December 1892. The lead role was taken by W. J. Robertson.

The play was performed in March 1907 in New York at the Herald Square Theatre.

It was performed at the Shaw Festival in 2003.

On 3 July 2011, a radio adaptation directed by Martin Jarvis was broadcast on BBC Radio 3 starring Ian McKellen as Sartorius, Charles Dance as William Cokane, Honeysuckle Weeks as Blanche, Dan Stevens as Harry Trench and Tim Pigott-Smith as Lickcheese.

It was performed in New York City at Theatre Row in March 2016 in a production with The Actors Company Theater and Gingold Theatrical Group. The production was directed by David Staller.
