= Princess Toto =

Comic opera by W. S. Gilbert and Frederic Clay

Santley as Toto

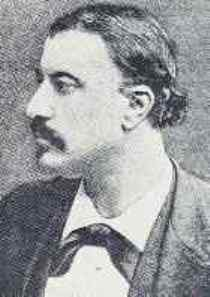
Frederic Clay

Princess Toto is a three-act comic opera by W. S. Gilbert and his early collaborator Frederic Clay. Its pre-London tour opened on 24 June 1876 at the Theatre Royal, Nottingham, starring Kate Santley, W. S. Penley and J. H. Ryley. It transferred to the Royal Strand Theatre in London on 2 October 1876 for a run of only 48 performances. Brief New York and Boston runs followed in 1879–80 starring Leonora Braham and Ryley, and there were later tours in the US. Princess Toto was revived in 1881 at the Opera Comique in London for a run of 65 performances (starring Richard Temple). There was also an 1886 revival in Australia.

== Background ==
Princess Toto was the last work in a long and successful partnership with Clay that had produced four of Gilbert's major musical works up to that date. The year before, Gilbert and Arthur Sullivan, Clay's friend, had premiered their hit Trial by Jury, and after Princess Toto, Gilbert would not collaborate on any further operas with anyone other than Sullivan for the next 15 years.

Despite Clay's tuneful score and Gilbert's amusing libretto, the piece was not a major success, although it did enjoy the various tours and revivals over the years. After the initial production at Nottingham and the subsequent provincial tour, Gilbert sold the performing rights to Clay for a period of ten years. Therefore, it was Clay who oversaw the London productions of 1876 and 1881, and also the New York production and American tours during 1879–80 and later. The theatrical newspaper The Era gave a positive review of the New York production.

The most recent professional production that has been traced was staged by the Birmingham Repertory Company in 1935. A number of amateur companies have staged the piece since the early 1990s.

The publisher of the music, Cramer & Co., stated that the band parts and original printing plates for both Vocal Score and Libretto were destroyed in the World War II London blitz. However, a copy of the parts survives in Australia.

== Roles and original cast ==
- King Portico (bass) – John Wainwright
- Zapeter, his prime minister (bass-baritone) – J. H. Ryley
- Jamilek, his grand chamberlain (tenor) – W. H. Seymour
- Prince Caramel, betrothed to Princess Toto (comic baritone) – Joseph E. Beyer
- Count Floss, member of Prince Caramel's suite (baritone) – B. R. Pepper
- Baron Jacquier, member of Prince Caramel's suite (tenor) – W. S. Penley
- Prince Doro, also betrothed to Princess Toto (tenor) – E. Loredan
- Princess Toto, daughter of King Portico (coloratura soprano) – Kate Santley
- Jelly, Toto's nurse (mezzo-soprano) – Alice Hamilton

Chorus: Courtiers and court ladies, pages, brigands, and Red Indians

Non-singing characters in the initial run, but not revivals

- Giovanni, an old beggar
- Paolini, Vergillo, Tapioca, Sago, Vermicelli and Cathay
- Devine, Princess Toto’s favourite page

Characters added later

- Follette (soprano)
- A Prisoner (non-singing)

== Synopsis ==
=== Act I ===
King Portico, a highly dignified and scrupulously correct monarch, is generally worried that the newspapers might print something embarrassing about the royal family, especially the king's eccentric daughter, Princess Toto. Prince Doro, to whom Toto was betrothed in infancy, is reported to have been eaten by cannibals, so Portico has chosen the "highly respectable" Prince Caramel to receive Toto's hand. Caramel is already three days late for the wedding, and King Portico fears that he will not arrive at all. Prince Doro arrives after ten years shipwrecked "on a savage shore." He hopes that Toto still loves him. King Portico says that Doro cannot marry Toto, since, if he isn't dead, he has placed the king "in a very awkward and ridiculous position." He tells Doro that he hasn't lost much, since Toto is not only absent-minded but excessively romantic: "her head is filled with foolish ideas about Gypsies, robbers, actors, pirates, paving commissioners, Red Indians, and outlandish people of that sort," and her fancy has now fallen on the notorious brigand Barberini.

Princess Toto arrives, trying to remember why she is all dressed up. The others remind her that she is to be married, but that Prince Caramel hasn't arrived. She wants to go ahead perform the ceremony without delay. After all, "Who cares about the bridegroom at a wedding?" When the king insists on the need for a bridegroom, Toto suggests the stranger. When she learns that this stranger is Prince Doro, she asks him whether it hurt to be eaten by cannibals. Doro points out that he is alive, and Toto wishes to proceed with the wedding. The king, worried that Caramel may arrive and cause him embarrassment, leaves his prime minister, Zapeter, to explain the situation to Caramel, and the wedding party departs.

Caramel then arrives. Although he is a mild-mannered young man, when he learns that his fiancée is marrying another man, he threatens to interrupt the ceremony. Zapeter suggests that he pretend to be the brigand Barberini, and that the princess would forget her marriage to Doro. Toto is thrilled to meet the dashing "Barberini". She is surprised that he doesn't look like the "ferocious monster" who had been describe to her, but Caramel explains: "that's my nasty cunning; it disarms people and puts them off their guard." Toto is eager to join the "brigands", and so they depart.

=== Act II ===
In the mountains, Prince Caramel's court pretends to be a band of brigands. They have taken an old beggar captive and are serving him their best food and wine. Word has got around, and people have come from miles around hoping to be taken prisoner. Jelly, Princess Toto's maid, scolds the band, advising that they should be "cutting them up and sending them home in little bits", and Toto is similarly disappointed in the brigands' behaviour. Toto has had a pleasant dream about marrying "a beautiful young Prince named Doro," and wishes she could have the same dream again. But she agrees to marry "Barberini," and they leave to wed.

Doro arrives, upset at the loss of his bride so soon after their wedding. He has decided to become a brigand and die an outlaw. Caramel, returning from his wedding with Toto, hints to her that it would be amusing if it turned out that he wasn't a real brigand after all but a respectable man. Toto says that if she were to find that he had deceived her in this way she would shoot him. Caramel therefore decides to continue to deceive her. Doro asks "Barberini" for a place in the brigand band and is refused. Toto insists that this promising fellow should be hired. Doro recognises Toto, but she merely finds his face familiar. When they are left alone he reveals that he is her husband. She notes the marriage to Barberini, but she recognises him as the husband of her dreams and informs him that he will disappear when she wakes up. He finally convinces her that he is real, and that she ran off with "Barberini" within minutes of their marriage. She begs his pardon and promises to stop marrying other men, although she still cannot remember his name. They sneak away.

King Portico arrives with Zapeter and Jamilek, dressed as American Indians, hoping that their colourful disguises will lure Toto into going home with them. Zapeter has "diligently studied the works of Fenimore Cooper" and Jamilek speaks in the metre of Longfellow's poem "Hiawatha." Portico threatens Zapeter with execution if news of their embarrassing ruse should get into the papers. They hear a loud soprano voice (Toto's) singing. Zapeter "listens with his ear close to the ground," and impresses the king by deducing that a woman approaches. Toto appears and is intrigued by their primitive appearance. She determines to join them and "perhaps marry one of the tribe, and become a squaw." They leave. Caramel and his band arrives, but his men refuse to give chase.

=== Act III ===
On a tropical island, King Portico's court is still pretending to be Indians. Portico is concerned about how Toto will react when she learns of the deception. Again, Toto is disappointed with the behaviour of the "Indians", who eat caviar and refuse to hunt wild buffalo. Portico is finds out that a boat is approaching and is afraid that he will be ridiculed, but Jamilek suggests that he hide in some prickly cactus. Caramel and Doro arrive in the boat, having become friends – each thinks the other is going to help him recover his lost bride.

Caramel meets Toto and identifies himself as both Prince Caramel and Barberini. Toto asks, "Didn't I marry you or something?" She apologises and sings that she will always love him. She then sings the second verse to Doro without realising that he's a different person. After some confusion, Toto decides that Doro is her real husband and tells Caramel that he is only a dream. Caramel proposes to Jelly. The princess admits that she has been mistaken. Her father appears. Toto agrees to marry Doro (again) and places herself in his hands.

== Musical numbers ==
N.B. There is no particular significance to why some songs are numbered "9a", "10a" and so on, except 1a (reprise of 1). It probably just indicates that additional songs were added after composing had begun and the scores were never renumbered to reflect it. It does not, for instance, indicate that the songs run into each other.

Act I

- Prelude
- 1. "This is a court in which you'll find" (Chorus)
- 1a. Exit music for Chorus: Reprise of "This is a court in which you'll find"
- 2. "Oh bride of mine" (Doro)
- 3. "Of our opinion to impart" (Chorus of Bridesmaids and Princess Toto)
- 4. "Like an arrow from its quiver" (Princess Toto)
- 5. "Come let us hasten, love, to make us one" ... "We cannot wait" (Doro, Toto, Jelly, Zapeter and King)
- 6. March: "With princely state" (Caramel, Floss, and Jacquier)
- 7. "My hand upon it – 'tis agreed" (Caramel, Floss, Jacquier, and Zapeter)
- 8. Vocal Waltz: "Banish sorrow till tomorrow" (Toto, Doro and Chorus)
- 9. "Oh tell me now, by plighted vow" (Doro and Toto)
- 9a. Finale, Act I: "A hat and a bright little feather" (Ensemble)
- Entr'acte

Act II

- 10. "Cheer up, old man" (Jacquier and Chorus)
- 10a. "We are nobles all, though in brigands' disguise" (Chorus)
- 11. "I have two worlds – I live two lives" (Toto)
- 12. "At last I shall marry my own" (Toto, Caramel, Jelly, Floss, and Chorus)
- 13. "There are brigands in every station" (Doro)
- 14. "So take my hand, it is agreed" (Toto, Doro, and Caramel)
- 15. "My own, own love, my gentle wife" (Doro and Toto)
- 16. Entrance of 'Red Indians': "With skip and hop" (King, Zapeter, and Jamilek)
- 17. Finale, Act II: "Away, away to Indian isles" (Ensemble)

Act III

- Prelude
- 18. "Bang the merry tom-tom, sing the merry song" (Folette, Zapeter, Jamilek, and Chorus)
- 18a: Cut Song: "The King of the Pigs was a good piggee" (Toto and Chorus)
- 19. Barcarolle: "When you're afloat in an open boat" (Jelly, with Doro, Caramel, Jacquier, and Floss)
- 20. "I'm a simple little maid" (Toto)
- 21. Finale, Act III: "So pardon, pray, you may depend" ... "At last I shall marry my own" (Toto, Doro, and Ensemble)

== Critical response ==
When the pre-London tour reached Edinburgh The Scotsman's critic commented that if every comic opera had the benefit of a libretto by Gilbert the genre would be even more popular than it already was. Clay's music was thought "light, tuneful and thoroughly congenial", though not of any great originality, and showing some indebtedness to Offenbach. When the piece opened in the West End, The Globe judged it an "unequivocal success", praised the libretto ("sparkles with wit") and found Clay's music "unambitious" but "flowing and pleasant" and at its best in the vocal solos. The Illustrated Sporting and Dramatic News thought the libretto exceptional: "Not only are the incidents laughter-provoking, but the dialogue is full of unexpected sallies of wit and humour which provoke irrepressible laughter". The paper observed that although Clay's music "cannot claim high rank, it ripples pleasantly along."

When the piece opened in New York in 1880 The Era's correspondent wrote that although inevitable comparisons between the music of Princess Toto and that of H.M.S. Pinafore were not to the advantage of the former, there were some "pleasing numbers and characteristic music". Gilbert's libretto was highly praised, and the reviewer thought him capable of "confer[ring] upon the British and American Drama a lasting and inestimable benefit".
