= Independent Theatre Society =

1890s group staging theatrical productions in London, England

The Independent Theatre Society was a by-subscription-only organisation in London from 1891 to 1897, founded by Dutch drama critic Jacob Grein to give "special performances of plays which have a literary and artistic rather than a commercial value." The society was inspired by its continental forerunners, the Théâtre-Libre (Free Theatre) and Die Freie Bühne (Free Stage). The Society produced modern realist plays, mostly by continental European playwrights, on the London stage.

== Description ==
The Society's performances, using professional actors, were given in theatres that were otherwise 'dark' — on Sundays, when no normal performances were scheduled. Because membership was by subscription, the performances were not "public", and so the Society was allowed to perform plays that had not received a licence from the Lord Chamberlain's Office; and in this way they were able to avoid the censorship of the London stage.

During 1891, the Royalty Theatre fell vacant and offered the Society an opportunity to stage plays with a professional cast and crew. The first performance for the Society there was of Henrik Ibsen's Ghosts, on 13 March 1891 — in a translation by William Archer. This was followed by Émile Zola's Thérèse Raquin on 9 October 1891. Both plays were greeted with a storm of protest. Ghosts was described thus: "an orderly audience, including many ladies... listened attentively to the dramatic exposition of a subject which is not usually discussed outside the walls of an hospital". Other critics called for the withdrawal of Kate Santley's licence. The following year, Grein approached the (then) young theatre critic George Bernard Shaw for a play for the Society. Shaw's first play, Widowers' Houses, premièred for the Society at the Royalty Theatre on 9 December 1892. A Question of Memory by Michael Field premièred on 27 October 1893; and The Black Cat by Irish playwright, John Todhunter received its only performance, on 8 December 1893, at the Opera Comique. The Society premièred Ibsen's The Wild Duck (in translation) in 1894. In 1895, Grein invited Aurélien Lugné-Poe to present a season of productions in French, of Ibsen's Rosmersholm, The Master Builder and Maurice Maeterlinck's symbolist L'Intruse and Pelléas and Mélisande.

Membership of the Society never exceeded 175, but it was influential, including George Meredith, Arthur Wing Pinero, Thomas Hardy, Henry James, and the Irish novelist George Moore amongst the members. In 1895, Shaw wrote (of the Society) "The Independent Theatre is an excellent institution, simply because it is independent. The disparagers ask what it is independent of.... It is, of course, independent of commercial success.... If Mr Grein had not taken the dramatic critics of London and put them in a row before Ghosts and The Wild Duck, with a small but inquisitive and influential body of enthusiasts behind them, we should be far less advanced today than we are. The real history of the drama for the last ten years is not the history of the prosperous enterprises of Mr Hare, Mr Irving, and the established West-End theatres, but of the forlorn hopes led by Mr Vernon, Mr Charrington, Mr Grein, Messrs Henly and Stevenson, Miss Achurch, Miss Robins and Miss Lea, Miss Farr and the rest of the Impossibilities." He went on to urge that the London managers "might provide one marketable play each year", so that the Society could continue as a laboratory for experimental theatre.

As a result of its small subscription base and its high ambitions, the Society was not financially successful and was wound up in 1897, having presented 22 productions and premières of an additional 26 one-act programmes. The Incorporated Stage Society took over the work two years later and was itself the inspiration for the formation of the Abbey Theatre in Dublin and the English Stage Company, which is today the resident company of the Royal Court Theatre. Grein continued his interest in European theatre, founding the German Theatre in London Programme in 1900 with his future wife, the actress and playwright, Alice Augusta Greeven.
