= Stage Society =

The Incorporated Stage Society, commonly known as the Stage Society, was an English theatre society with limited membership which mounted private Sunday performances of new and experimental plays, mainly at the Royal Court Theatre (whose Vedrenne-Barker management is said to have originated in the Society's work) but also at other London West End venues. Founded in 1899 "to regenerate the Drama", it followed the Independent Theatre Society in this activity. Its plays particularly included the first performances of plays that had been banned for public performance by the Lord Chamberlain. George Bernard Shaw, Harley Granville Barker, St. John Hankin, Gilbert Murray and Clifford Bax were all involved with the company.

Its council decided in 1930 that the rise of other groups like the Gate Theatre meant the Society's work was complete and, though a 1930 proposal for its dissolution was defeated, it fell into abeyance on the outbreak of the Second World War in 1939. Its aims were continued post-war by the English Stage Company, the resident company at the Royal Court Theatre.

== Productions ==
The Society produced over 200 plays by authors like Shaw, Gerhart Hauptmann, Anton Chekhov, Henrik Ibsen, Frank Wedekind and Jean Cocteau.

- Shaw's You Never Can Tell (26 November 1899, Royalty Theatre, the company's first production, resulting in a police raid)
- The Good Hope (a translation of Hermann Heijermans's Op Hoop van Zegen, 1900)
- Shaw's Mrs Warren's Profession (5 January 1902, New Lyric Club)
- Shaw's The Admirable Bashville (Imperial Theatre London, 1903)
- St. John Hankin's The Two Mr. Wetherbys (Imperial Theatre London, 15 March 1903)
- Shaw's John Bull's Other Island (1904, second production)
- Joseph Conrad's One Day More (1905)
- Harley Granville Barker's first version of Waste (Royal Court, 1907)
- George Calderon's The Fountain (1909)
- Frederick Herbert Trench's verse play Napoleon (1918).
- Ernst Toller's The Machine Wreckers (Kingsway Theatre, 1923, including Martita Hunt)
- R. C. Sherriff's Journey's End (Apollo Theatre, 1928)
- C. L. R. James's Toussaint Louverture (Westminster Theatre, 1936)
