= Cedric Hardwicke =

English actor (1893–1964)

Sir Cedric Hardwicke
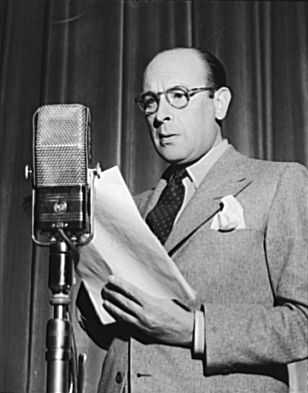
- On the radio show Three Thirds of the Nation, 3 June 1942
- Born: Cedric Webster Hardwicke; 19 February 1893; Lye, Stourbridge, Worcestershire, England
- Died: 6 August 1964 (aged 71); New York City, U.S.
- Occupation: Actor
- Years active: 1912–1964
- Spouses: Helena Pickard (m. 1928; div. 1948) Mary Scott (m. 1950; div. 1961)
- Children: 2, including Edward Hardwicke

Sir Cedric Webster Hardwicke (19 February 1893 – 6 August 1964) was an English stage and film actor whose career spanned over 50 years. His theatre work included notable performances in productions of the plays of Shakespeare and Shaw, and his film work included leading roles in several adapted literary classics.

== Early life ==
Hardwicke was born in Lye, Worcestershire (now West Midlands), to Edwin Webster Hardwicke and his wife, Jessie (née Masterson). He initially attended Stourbridge Grammar School moving to Bridgnorth Grammar School in Shropshire in September 1907 until July 1911. He intended to train as a doctor but failed to pass the necessary examinations. He turned to the theatre and trained at the Royal Academy of Dramatic Art (RADA).

=== Military service ===
Hardwicke enlisted at the outbreak of the First World War. He served with the London Scottish from 1914 to 1921 as an officer in the Judge Advocate's branch of the British Army in France. He was one of the last members of the British Expeditionary Force to leave France. According to the Daily Mirror 1 January 1934, Hardwicke was one of the officers who escorted The Unknown Warrior from France, on HMS Verdun.

== Career ==
=== Stage ===
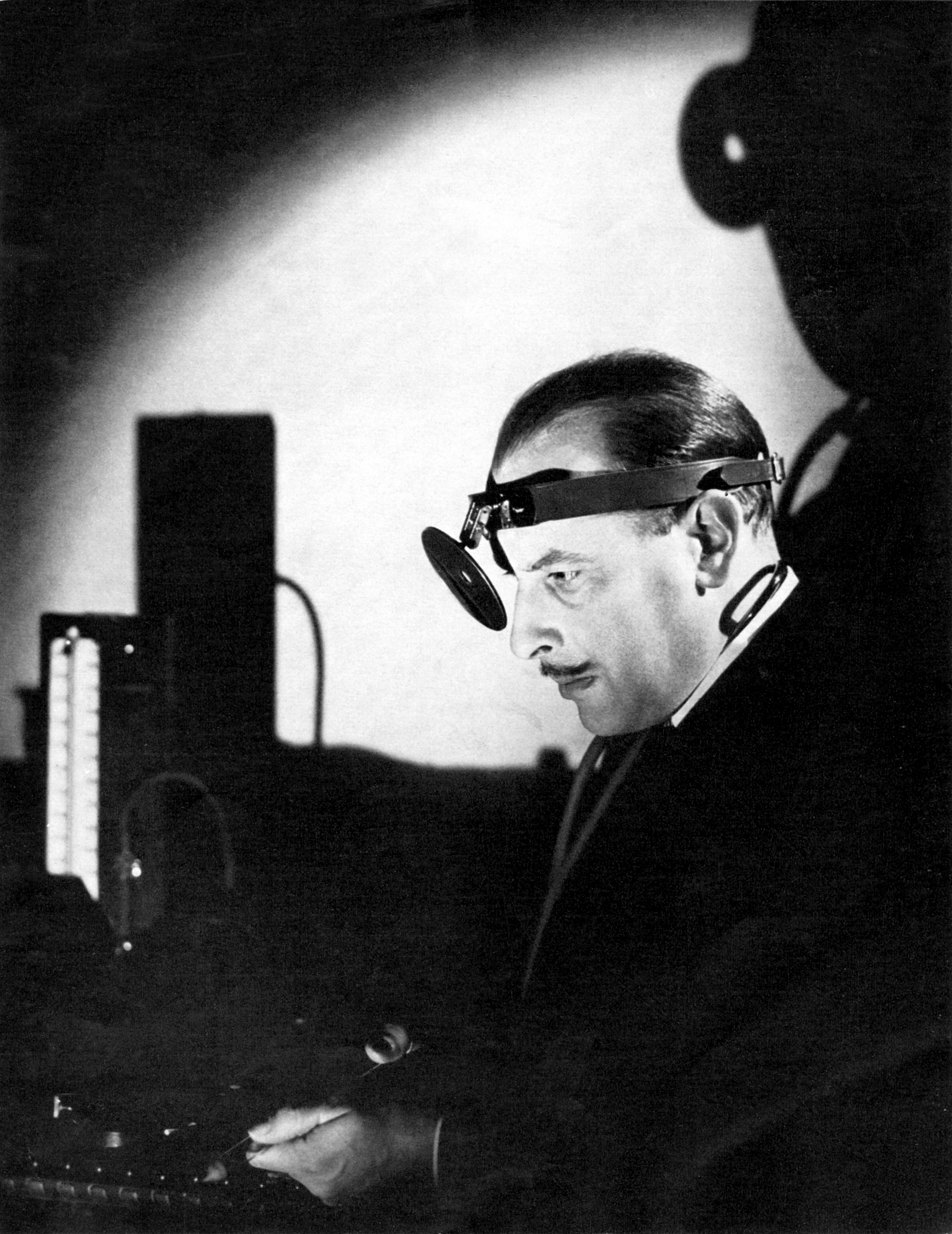
Hardwicke in the 1937 Broadway production of The Amazing Dr. Clitterhouse

Hardwicke made his first appearance on stage at the Lyceum Theatre, London in 1912 during the run of Frederick Melville's melodrama The Monk and the Woman, when he took over the part of Brother John. During this year, he was at Her Majesty's Theatre understudying, and subsequently appeared at the Garrick Theatre in Charles Klein's play Find the Woman, and Trust the People. In 1913, he joined Benson's Company and toured in the provinces, South Africa, and Rhodesia. During 1914 he toured with Miss Darragh (Letitia Marion Dallas, d. 1917) in Laurence Irving's play The Unwritten Law, and he appeared at the Old Vic in 1914 as Malcolm in Macbeth, Tranio in The Taming of the Shrew, the gravedigger in Hamlet, and other roles.

After serving in the British Army in WWI, he resumed his acting career. In January 1922, he joined the Birmingham Repertory Company, playing a range of parts from the drooping young lover Faulkland in The Rivals to the roistering Sir Toby Belch in Twelfth Night.

He played many classical roles on stage, appearing at London's top theatres, making his name on the stage performing works by George Bernard Shaw, who said that Hardwicke was his fifth favourite actor after the four Marx Brothers. As one of the leading Shavian actors of his generation, Hardwicke starred in Caesar and Cleopatra, Pygmalion, The Apple Cart, Candida, Too True to Be Good, and Don Juan in Hell, making such an impression that at the age of 41 he became the youngest actor to be knighted (this occurred in the 1934 New Year's Honours; Laurence Olivier subsequently took the record in 1947 when he was knighted at the age of 40). Other stage successes included The Amazing Dr. Clitterhouse, Antigone and A Majority of One, winning a Tony Award nomination for his performance as a Japanese diplomat.

In 1928, whilst appearing with Edith Day, Paul Robeson and Alberta Hunter in the London production of Show Boat, he married actress Helena Pickard.

In December 1935, Hardwicke was elected Rede Lecturer to Cambridge University for 1936, he took as his subject "The Drama Tomorrow". In the late 1930s, he moved to the U.S., initially for film work. In the early 1940s, he continued his stage career on tours and in New York.

In 1944, Hardwicke returned to Britain, again touring, and reappeared on the London stage, at the Westminster Theatre, on 29 March 1945, as Richard Varwell in a revival of Eden and Adelaide Phillpotts' comedy Yellow Sands, and subsequently toured in this on the continent. He returned to America late in 1945 and appeared with Ethel Barrymore in December in a revival of Shaw's Pygmalion, and continued on the New York stage the following year. In 1946, he starred opposite Katharine Cornell as King Creon in her production of Jean Anouilh's adaptation of the Greek tragedy Antigone.

In 1948, he joined the Old Vic Company at the New Theatre to play Sir Toby Belch, Doctor Faustus, and Gaev in The Cherry Orchard, but according to critic and biographer W.A. Darlington, "it was about this time that he confessed to a friend that he was finding the competition in London too hot for him", and he moved permanently to the U.S. In 1951–52, he appeared on Broadway in Shaw's Don Juan in Hell with Agnes Moorehead, Charles Boyer and Charles Laughton.

=== Film and television work ===
Hardwicke's first appearance in a British film was in 1931, and from the late 1930s, he was in great demand in Hollywood. He played David Livingstone opposite Spencer Tracy's Henry Morton Stanley in Stanley and Livingstone in 1939, and also played the evil Frollo in the remake of The Hunchback of Notre Dame starring Charles Laughton the same year. In 1940, he played Mr. Jones in a screen version of Joseph Conrad's novel Victory. He starred as the unfortunate Ludwig von Frankenstein in The Ghost of Frankenstein (1942) alongside Lon Chaney Jr. as Frankenstein's monster and Bela Lugosi as Ygor.

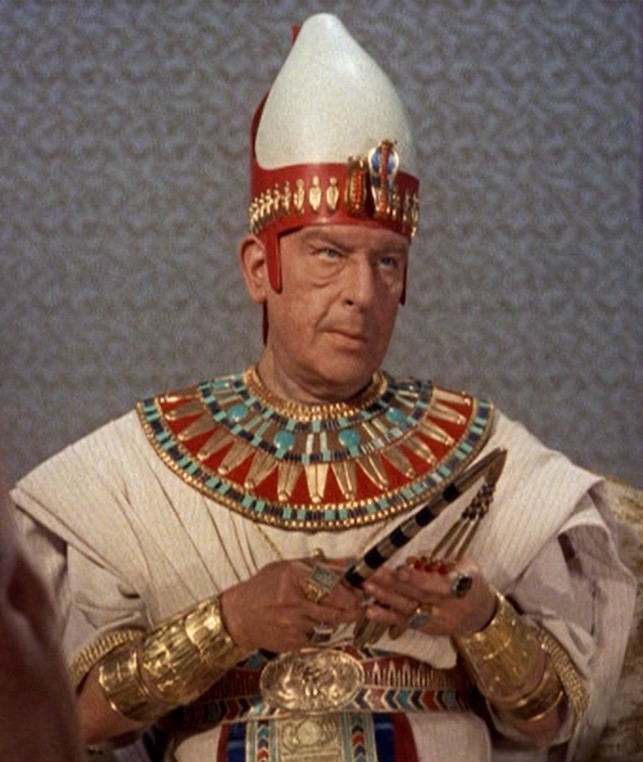
Hardwicke portraying Egyptian Pharaoh Sethi in The Ten Commandments (1956)

Hardwicke played in films such as Les Misérables (1935) with Fredric March and Charles Laughton, the first ever three-strip Technicolor film Becky Sharp (1935), King Solomon's Mines (1937), The Keys of the Kingdom (1944), The Winslow Boy (1948), Alfred Hitchcock's Rope (1948) with James Stewart, and Olivier's Richard III (1955). He was featured as King Arthur in the comedy/musical A Connecticut Yankee in King Arthur's Court (1949), singing Busy Doing Nothing in a trio with Bing Crosby and William Bendix, and as the Pharaoh Sethi in Cecil B. DeMille's 1956 film The Ten Commandments starring Charlton Heston as Moses.

Also in 1956, Hardwicke appeared in the first episode of the second season of Alfred Hitchcock Presents, titled "Wet Saturday", in which he portrayed Mr. Princey, an aristocratic gentleman who tries to cover up a murder to avoid public scandal. On 6 March 1958, he guest-starred on the TV series The Ford Show starring Tennessee Ernie Ford.

In 1961, he co-starred with Gertrude Berg in the Four Star Television situation comedy, Mrs. G. Goes to College (retitled The Gertrude Berg Show at mid-season). The series was cancelled after one season.

=== Radio ===
In 1945, Hardwicke played Sherlock Holmes in a BBC Radio dramatisation of The Speckled Band, opposite Finlay Currie as Dr. Watson. Years later, Hardwicke's son Edward played Watson in the acclaimed Granada series.

Hardwicke played the titular role in a short-lived revival of the Bulldog Drummond radio program on the Mutual Broadcasting System, which ran 3 January 1954 to 28 March 1954.

== Personal life ==
In 1928, he married the English actress Helena Pickard. They divorced in 1948; their son was actor Edward Hardwicke. His second marriage, which produced a son, Michael, and likewise ended in divorce, was to actress Mary Scott (1921–2009), from 1950 to 1961.

A lifelong heavy smoker, he suffered from emphysema and died, 6 August 1964, at the age of 71, in New York, from chronic obstructive pulmonary disease. Hardwicke's body was flown back to England; after a memorial service he was cremated at Golders Green Crematorium in north London, where his ashes were scattered.

== Legacy ==
Hardwicke left two volumes of memoirs: Let's Pretend: Recollections and Reflections of a Lucky Actor, 1932 and A Victorian in Orbit: The Irreverent Memoirs (as told to James Brough), 1961. He is commemorated by a sculpture by Tim Tolkien at Lye, commissioned by the Dudley Metropolitan Borough Council. The memorial takes the form of a giant filmstrip, the illuminated cut metal panels illustrating scenes from some of Hardwicke's better-known roles, which include The Hunchback of Notre Dame, Things to Come, and The Ghost of Frankenstein. Unveiled in November 2005, it is located at Lye Cross where he lived as a child. Thorns School and Community College in neighbouring Quarry Bank has renamed its drama theatre in his honour as the Hardwicke Theatre.

Hardwicke has a motion pictures star and a television star on the Hollywood Walk of Fame.

== Filmography ==
- Nelson (1926) as Horatio Nelson (film debut)
- Dreyfus (1931) as Captain Alfred Dreyfus
- Rome Express (1932) as Alistair McBane
- The Ghoul (1933) as Broughton
- Orders Is Orders (1934) as Brigadier
- Bella Donna (1934)
- Nell Gwyn (1934) as Charles II
- The Lady Is Willing (1934) as Gustav Dupont
- Jew Süss (1934) as Rabbi Gabriel
- The King of Paris (1934) as Max Till
- Les Misérables (1935) as Bishop Bienvenu
- Becky Sharp (1935) as Marquis of Steyne
- Peg of Old Drury (1935) as David Garrick
- Things to Come (1936) as Theotocopulos
- Tudor Rose (1936) as Earl of Warwick
- Laburnum Grove (1936) as Mr. Baxley
- Green Light (1937) as Dean Harcourt
- King Solomon's Mines (1937) as Allan Quartermain
- On Borrowed Time (1939) as Mr. Brink
- Stanley and Livingstone (1939) as David Livingstone
- The Hunchback of Notre Dame (1939) as Frollo
- The Invisible Man Returns (1940) as Richard Cobb
- Tom Brown's School Days (1940) as Dr. Thomas Arnold
- The Howards of Virginia (1940) as Fleetwood Peyton
- Victory (1940) as Mr. Jones
- Sundown (1941) as Bishop Coombes
- Suspicion (1941) as General McLaidlaw
- Valley of the Sun (1942) as Lord Warrick
- The Ghost of Frankenstein (1942) as Ludwig Frankenstein/Henry Frankenstein
- Invisible Agent (1942) as Conrad Stauffer
- Commandos Strike at Dawn (1942) as Admiral Bowen
- Forever and a Day (1943) as Mr. Dabb
- The Moon Is Down (1943) as Colonel Lanser
- The Cross of Lorraine (1943) as Father Sebastian
- The Lodger (1944) as Robert Bonting
- Wilson (1944) as Senator Henry Cabot Lodge
- Wing and a Prayer (1944) as Admiral
- Three Sisters of the Moors (1944, short) as Reverend Bronte
- The Keys of the Kingdom (1944) as Monsignor at Tweedside
- The Picture of Dorian Gray (1945) as Narrator
- Sentimental Journey (1946) as Jim Miller
- Beware of Pity (1946) as Albert Condor
- Nicholas Nickleby (1947) as Ralph Nickleby
- The Imperfect Lady (1947) as Lord Belmont
- Ivy (1947) as Police Inspector Orpington
- Lured (1947) as Julian Wilde
- Tycoon (1947) as Alexander
- A Woman's Vengeance (1948) as James Libbard
- Song of My Heart (1948) as Grand Duke
- I Remember Mama (1948) as Mr. Hyde
- The Winslow Boy (1948) as Arthur Winslow
- Rope (1948) as Henry Kentley
- A Connecticut Yankee in King Arthur's Court (1949) as Lord Pendragon / King Arthur
- Now Barabbas (1949) as Governor
- The White Tower (1950) as Nicholas Radcliffe
- You Belong to My Heart (1951) as Bernand
- The Desert Fox (1951) as Karl Strolin
- The Green Glove (1952) as Father Goron
- Caribbean Gold (1952) as Captain Francis Barclay
- Botany Bay (1953) as Governor Phillip
- Salome (1953) as Tiberius Caesar
- The War of the Worlds (1953) as Commentary (voice)
- Bait (1954) as Prologue Speaker
- Richard III (1955) as King Edward IV of England
- Alfred Hitchcock Presents (1956) (Season 2 Episode 1 (No 40 in the series: "Wet Saturday") as Mr. Princey
- Diane (1956) as Ruggieri
- Helen of Troy (1956) as Priam
- Gaby (1956) as Mr. Edgar Carrington
- The Vagabond King (1956) as Tristan
- The Power and the Prize (1956) as Mr. Carew
- The Ten Commandments (1956) as Sethi
- Around the World in 80 Days (1956) as Sir Francis Cromarty
- Alfred Hitchcock Presents (1957) (Season 2 Episode 33: "A Man Greatly Beloved") as "John Anderson"
- The Story of Mankind (1957) as High Judge
- Baby Face Nelson (1957) as Doc Saunders
- Five Weeks in a Balloon (1962) as Fergusson
- Twilight Zone (November 14,1963) (Season 5 Episode 8: "Uncle Simon") as Uncle Simon
- The Pumpkin Eater (1964) as Mr. James - Jo's father (posthumous release; final film role)
- The Outer Limits (1964) as Colas in "The Forms of Things Unknown" (posthumous release; final role)

== Sources ==
- Thomson, David. 2002. The New Bibliographical Dictionary of Film. Alfred A. Knopf, New York. ISBN 0-375-41128-3
- Let's Pretend: Recollections and Reflections of a Lucky Actor, foreword by Sir Barry Jackson, (1932) Grayson & Grayson
- Parker, John (1947). Who's Who in the Theatre (Tenth revised ed.). London: Pitman. OCLC 6344958.
