= Young Woodley =

Young Woodley may refer to:

- Young Woodley (play), a 1925 British play by John Van Druten
  - Young Woodley (1928 film), a silent film adaptation, never released
  - Young Woodley (1930 film), a 1930 sound film adaptation by Thomas Bentley
