= The Man Who Changed His Name =

The Man Who Changed His Name may refer to:

- The Man Who Changed His Name (play), a 1928 mystery play by Edgar Wallace
- The Man Who Changed His Name (1928 film), a silent film adaptation
- The Man Who Changed His Name (1934 film), a sound film adaptation
- The Man Who Changed His Name, a 1986 novel by Eric Wright
