= Yellow Sands =

Yellow Sands may refer to:

- Yellow Sands (play)
- Yellow Sands (film)
- Members of the Yellow Sand Society, a Chinese secret society

== See also ==
- "Come Unto These Yellow Sands", a song in Shakespeare's play The Tempest
