= The Apple Cart =

Play by George Bernard Shaw

The Apple Cart: A Political Extravaganza
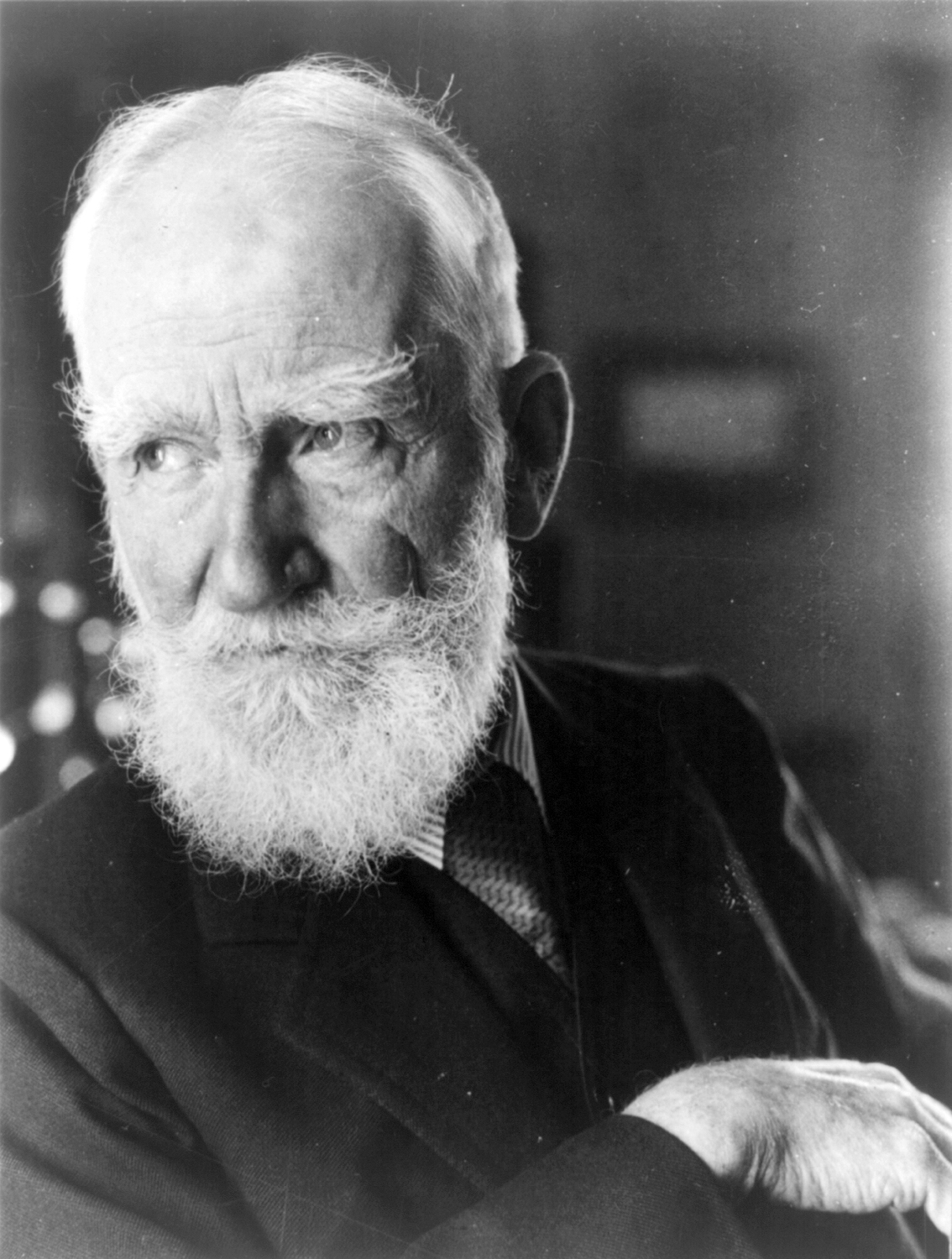
- Original language: English
- Written by: George Bernard Shaw
- Subject: A British king defends his role in government
- Genre: Satire

Premiere
- Date: 14 June 1929
- Place: Polish Theatre, Warsaw

The Apple Cart: A Political Extravaganza is a 1928 play by Bernard Shaw. It is a satirical comedy about several political philosophies which are expounded by the characters, often in lengthy monologues. The plot follows the fictional English King Magnus as he spars with, and ultimately outwits, his Prime Minister, Proteus, and his cabinet, who seek to strip the monarchy of its remaining political influence. Magnus opposes the corporation "Breakages, Limited", which controls politicians and impedes technical progress. Shaw's preface describes the play as:

...a comedy in which a King defeats an attempt by his popularly elected Prime Minister to deprive him of the right to influence public opinion through the press and the platform: in short, to reduce him to a cipher. The King's reply is that rather than be a cipher he will abandon his throne and take his obviously very rosy chance of becoming a popularly elected Prime Minister himself.

The play was completed in December 1928 and first performed in Warsaw (in Polish) the following June. Its English première was at the first Malvern Drama Festival in August 1929.

== Background ==
Sir Barry Jackson, who had presented and directed the British premiere of Shaw's Back to Methuselah at the Birmingham Repertory Theatre in 1923, grew disillusioned with the commercial theatre, particularly that of the West End, and conceived the idea of founding an out-of-town theatre festival at Malvern, starting in 1928. Shaw was impressed by Jackson's plan and promised that if the Malvern Festival was set up, he would write a new play for it. Having written nothing for the theatre since Saint Joan in 1923, Shaw worried that he might have exhausted his creative powers, but an idea for a new play came to him and, his biographer Michael Holroyd records, he "wrote it with extraordinary ease and swiftness ... In less than eight weeks he had a complete play".

== Characters ==
- Pamphilius – The King's private secretary
- Sempronius – The King's private secretary
- Bill Boanerges – President of the Board of Trade
- King Magnus
- Orinthia – The King's mistress
- Alice – Princess Royal
- Joe Proteus – Prime Minister
- Pliny – Chancellor of the Exchequer
- Nicobar – Foreign Secretary
- Crassus – Colonial Secretary
- Balbus – Home Secretary
- Amanda – Postmistress General
- Lysistrata – Powermistress General
- Vanhattan – American ambassador
- Queen Jemima

Shaw based King Magnus largely on himself. He modelled the enigmatic and pivotal character Orinthia, the King's mistress, on Mrs Patrick Campbell, the actress who had created the role of Eliza Doolittle in Shaw's Pygmalion.

== Productions ==
- In June 1929, just after the Warsaw premiere, Max Reinhardt staged the play in German translation at the Deutsches Theater, Berlin.
- The first production in the original English was given at the Malvern Festival, directed by H. K. Ayliff. The cast is given below.
- The Malvern production transferred to the West End at the Queen's Theatre in September 1929.
- In New York, the Theatre Guild presented the play at the Martin Beck Theatre in 1930: cast details in table below.
- The first London revival was in September 1935 at the Cambridge Theatre by the Macdona Players, with Esmé Percy as King Magnus, E. Bellendon-Clarke as Proteus, George Wray as Boanerges, Barbara Everest as Queen Jemima and Oriel Ross as Orinthia.
- In August 1946 a production was presented at the Arts Theatre, London starring Jack Hawkins as Magnus, Aubrey Dexter as Proteus, Jean Anderson as the Queen, Eileen Beldon as Lysistrata and Gwen Nelson as Amanda.
- The 1953 production at the Theatre Royal, Haymarket: details below.
- The second New York production was in 1957, at the Plymouth Theatre, with Maurice Evans as King Magnus, Charles Carson as Proteus and Signe Hasso as Orinthia.
- A 1965 production for the Prospect Theatre Company, directed by Peter Dews starred Marius Goring as King Magnus and Barbara Murray as Orinthia. Also in the cast were Alan MacNaughtan, Clive Swift and Caroline Blakiston.
- A 1970 production at the Mermaid Theatre starred John Neville as Magnus, with Maurice Denham as Proteus and Carmen Munroe as Orinthia.
- At the Chichester Festival and subsequently the Phoenix Theatre, London, in 1977 Keith Michell played Magnus, with Penelope Keith as Orinthia, Nigel Stock as Proteus, Paul Hardwick as Boanerges, June Jago as Lysistrata, Jo Warne as Amanda, and Jeanette Sterke as the Queen.
- A 1986 production directed by Val May starring Peter O'Toole opened at the Theatre Royal, Bath on 11 February and transferred to the Theatre Royal Haymarket on 20 February. Cast details in the table below.
- The Peter Hall Company's 2009 revival featured Charles Edwards as Magnus, James Laurenson as Proteus, Janie Dee as Orinthia and Barry Stanton as Boanerges.

Characters	Malvern, 1929	Broadway, 1930	Haymarket, 1953	Haymarket, 1986
Pamphilius	Wallace Evennett	Thomas A. Braidon	Geoffrey Dunn	John Scarborough
Sempronius	Scott Sunderland	Rex O'Malley	John Humphrey	John Franklyn-Robbins
Boanerges	Matthew Boulton	Ernest Cossart	George Rose	Paul Rogers
King Magnus	Cedric Hardwicke	Tom Powers	Noël Coward	Peter O'Toole
Orinthia	Edith Evans	Violet Kemble-Cooper	Margaret Leighton	Susannah York
Princess Alice	Eve Turner	Audrey Ridgewell	Jennifer Wright	Stephanie Lunn
Proteus	Charles Carson	Claude Rains	Laurence Naismith	Michael Denison
Pliny	Aubrey Mallalieu	John Dunn	Archibald Batty	Geoffrey Keen
Nicobar	Clifford Marquand	Morris Carnovsky	John Moffat	Marius Goring
Crassus	Julian D'Albie	George Graham	Peter Bayliss	David Waller
Balbus	Frank Moore	William H. Sams	Hugh Manning	Brewster Mason
Amanda	Dorothy Holmes-Gore	Eva Leonard-Boyne	Betty Warren	Dora Bryan
Lysistrata	Eileen Beldon	Helen Westley	Margaret Rawlings	Moira Lister
Vanhattan	James Carew	Frederick Truesdell	Cecil Trouncer	Bernard Braden
Queen Jemima	Barbara Everest	Marjorie Marquis	Alexis France	Dinah Sheridan

== Reception ==
The play was enthusiastically received. St John Ervine wrote:

How can I hope to put in a column and a half a fair measure of the brains that are in it? To produce such a piece of high farce, fantastic wisdom, high discourse, at the age of seventy-three, is a feat of which men half the age of Mr Shaw might be envious.

Desmond MacCarthy quoted other reviewers: "Let me say this is one of the most brilliant plays Bernard Shaw has written", and "To-day was a great event in the history of the English theatre". MacCarthy wrote in 1929 that although the characters are caricatures they are recognisably true to life:

King Magnus, unpretentious, subtle and selfless, is not only a real human being, but a creation of Mr Shaw’s moral insight, which is a much more remarkable gift than his faculty for hitting off types. It is that gift which makes him the superb dramatist he is.

In MacCarthy's analysis greatness of mind is not necessarily imposing or magnetic, and in a quiet and unselfish way Magnus shows up the inadequacies of Proteus and his cabinet.

== Adaptations ==
The play has been adapted for broadcasting, both on radio and on television. BBC radio transmitted a version in January 1947 with Ralph Truman as Magnus, Esmé Percy as Proteus and Margaret Rawlings as Orinthia. A version that omitted the Interlude between Magnus and Orinthia was broadcast in August 1952 with Peter Coke as the King and Ivan Samson as Proteus. A 1980 adaptation featured Peter Barkworth as Magnus, Nigel Stock as Proteus, Elizabeth Spriggs as Lysistrata, Dilys Laye as Amanda and Prunella Scales as Orinthia.

The first version of the play on British television was broadcast by the BBC in July 1957, with Jack Hawkins as Magnus, Willoughby Goddard as Proteus and Moira Lister as Orinthia, in a cast that also featured Hugh Sinclair, George Howe, William Mervyn, Angela Baddeley and Margaret Rawlings. In a BBC television version in 1975, Nigel Davenport played Magnus, Peter Barkworth Proteus, Bill Fraser Boanerges and Helen Mirren Orinthia.
