= Giallo (disambiguation) =

Giallo is the Italian term designating mystery fiction and thrillers.

Giallo may also refer to:

- Giallo (2009 film), an Italian horror giallo film
- Giallo (1933 film), an Italian comedy thriller film
- Giallo (TV channel), an Italian free television channel
- Verdicchio or giallo, a white Italian wine grape variety
