= Costume design =

Creation of clothing from an aesthetic standpoint

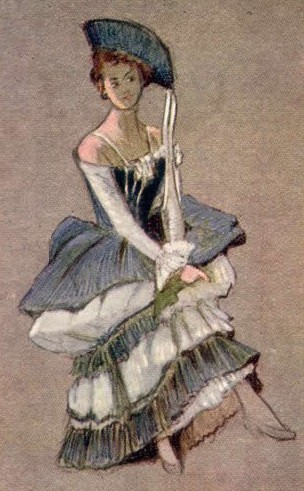
Costume design for Gianetta - The Gondoliers

Costume design is the process of selecting or creating clothing for performers. A costume may be designed from scratch or may be designed by combining existing garments. "Costume" may also refer to the style of dress particular to a nation, a social class, or historical period. It is intended to contribute to the fullness of the artistic, visual world which is unique to a particular theatrical or cinematic production. Costumes can denote status, age, or personality of a character, or provide visual interest to a character. Costumes may be for a theater, cinema, musical performance, cosplay, parties, or other events.

== History ==
In ancient Greek theatre, costumes were simplistic yet symbolic, aiding in character differentiation. Ritualized masks were a defining feature, allowing actors to convey emotions without switching masks. Ancient Greek village festivals and processions in honor of Dionysus (See also: Dionysia) are believed to be the origin of theatre, and therefore theatre costume. Sculpture and vase paintings provide the clearest evidence of these costumes. Ritualized masks were used giving each character a specific look. They varied depending on whether they were used for comedic or dramatic purposes. Some masks were constructed with a cheerful as well as a serious side on the same face in an attempt to indicate a change in emotion without a change of mask. The same is true for the Romans, who continued the mask tradition; doubling a mask made doubling roles easier.

During the Late Middle Ages in Europe, dramatic enactments of Bible stories were prevalent, therefore actual Christian vestments, stylized from traditional Byzantine court dress, were worn as costumes to keep the performances as realistic as possible. Stereotypical characterization was key when clothing performers for this style of theatre. In most instances actors had to supply their own costumes when playing a character found in daily life.

By the Elizabethan era, costumes became the most important visual element, often made from luxurious fabrics. In Elizabethan theatre of the 16th and 17th centuries in England, costume emerged as the most important visual element. Garments were very expensive as they were made from the finest fabrics. By the 17th and 18th centuries, European theatre saw actors wearing contemporary fashion with added elements like crowns to signify royalty.The majority of characters were clothed in contemporary Elizabethan fashion. The costumes could be divided into five categories: "Ancient", which was out of style clothing used to represent another period; "Antique", older additions to contemporary clothing to distinguish classical characters; Dreamlike, "fanciful" garments for supernatural or allegorical characters; "Traditional" clothing which represented only a few specific people, such as Robin Hood, or "National or Racial" costumes that were intended to set apart a specific group of people but did not tend to be historically accurate.

"Ordinarily, fashionable garments were used in both comedy and tragedy until 1727, when Adrienne Lecouvreur adopted the much more elaborate and formal court dress for tragedy. Her practice soon became standard for all tragic heroines" Major actors began to compete with one another about who would have the most lavish stage dress. This practice continued until around the 1750s when costumes became relevant to the character again. Art began to copy life and realistic characteristics were favored especially during the 19th century. The 19th century marked a shift toward historical accuracy, driven by figures like Georg II, Duke of Saxe-Meiningen, who insisted on authentic materials such as real chain mail and armor. For example, Georg the second, Duke of Saxe-Meiningen took personal interest in the theatre and began managing troupes. He advocated for authenticity and accuracy of the script and time period, therefore he refused to let actors tamper with their own costumes. He also made sure the materials were authentic and specific, using real chain mail, armor, swords, etc. No cheap substitutes would be allowed.

In August 1823, James Planché's advocacy for historically accurate Shakespearean costumes revolutionized British theatre, inspiring productions that prioritized realism, especially when it comes to costumes. In the same year, a casual conversation led to one of Planché's more lasting effects on British theatre. He observed to Charles Kemble, the manager of Covent Garden, that "while a thousand pounds were frequently lavished upon a Christmas pantomime or an Easter spectacle, the plays of Shakespeare were put upon the stage with makeshift scenery, and, at the best, a new dress or two for the principal characters." Kemble "saw the possible advantage of correct appliances catching the taste of the town" and agreed to give Planché control of the costuming for the upcoming production of King John, if he would carry out the research, design the costumes and superintend the production. Planché had little experience in this area and sought the help of antiquaries such as Francis Douce and Sir Samuel Meyrick. The research involved sparked Planché's latent antiquarian interests; these came to occupy an increasing amount of his time later in life.

Despite the actors' reservations, King John was a success and led to a number of similarly costumed Shakespeare productions by Kemble and Planché (Henry IV, Part I, As You Like It, Othello, Cymbeline, Julius Caesar). The designs and renderings of King John, Henry IV, As You Like It, Othello, Hamlet and Merchant of Venice were published, though there is no evidence that Hamlet and Merchant of Venice were ever produced with Planché's historically accurate costume designs. Planché also wrote a number of plays or adaptations which were staged with historically accurate costumes (Cortez, The Woman Never Vext, The Merchant's Wedding, Charles XII, The Partisans, The Brigand Chief, and Hofer). After 1830, although he still used period costume, he no longer claimed historical accuracy for his work in plays. His work in King John had brought about a "revolution in nineteenth-century stage practice" which lasted for almost a century.

In 1923 the first of a series of innovative modern dress productions of Shakespeare plays, Cymbeline, directed by H. K. Ayliff, opened at Barry Jackson's Birmingham Repertory Theatre in England.

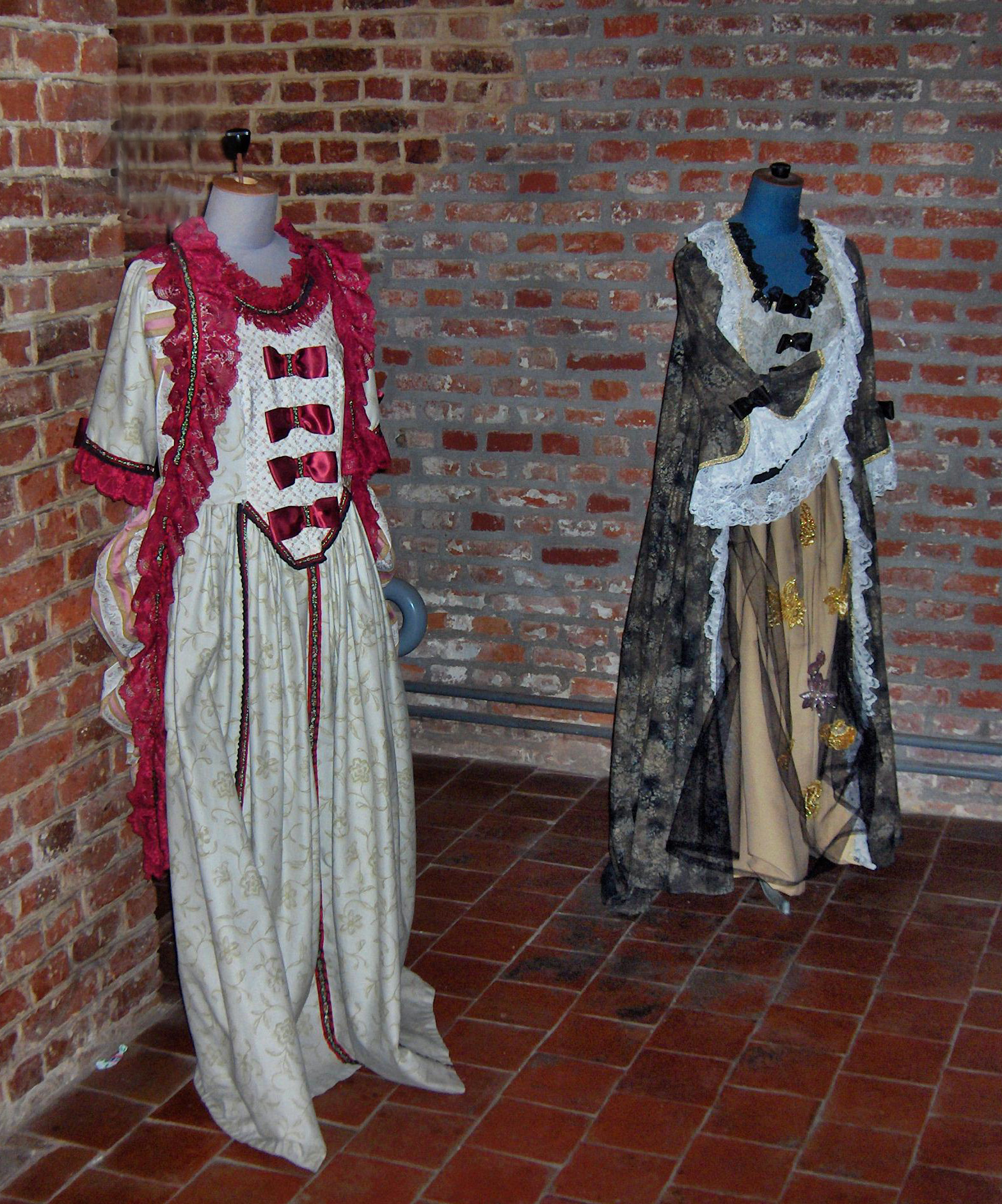
Historical costumes of Le Cateau Cambrésis, France

Costumes in Chinese theatre are very important, especially in Beijing Opera. They are usually heavily patterned with intense, bright colors. The standard items consist of at least 300 pieces and indicate the actors character type, age and social status through ornament, design, color and accessories. "Color is always used symbolically: red for loyalty and high position, yellow for royalty, and dark crimson for barbarians or military advisors." Symbolic significance is also found in the designs used for emblems. For example, the tiger stands for power and masculine strength. A majority of the clothing, regardless of rank, is made out of rich and luxurious materials. Makeup is also used symbolically and completes the overall look.

In Japanese Noh drama masks are always used and the prominent aspect of the costume. They are made of wood and usually last for generations. There are five basic types: male, female, aged, deities and monsters, all with many variations. The masks are changed often throughout the play. In Kabuki, another form of Japanese theatre, actors do not wear masks but rely heavily on makeup for the characterizations. Features are exaggerated or removed and for some of the athletic roles musculature is outlined in a specific pattern. Traditional costumes are used for each role, based upon historical garments that are altered for dramatic effect. "Some costumes weigh as much as fifty pounds, and stage attendants assist the actors in keeping them properly arranged while on stage"

In the 21st century digital technologies have ushered in a new era of costume design. Traditionally, theater costumers were manually crafted by hand, through sewing and patterns drafted on paper. Now, theater costumes are able to be designed using 3D printers, modeling software and other digital tools to create costumes more efficiently. Utilizing 3D costume-modeling programs and 3D printers allows designers to come up with the most efficient ways to save the amount of materials used on a project. Designers can optimize material usage with design software, and reduce costs through cheaper materials printed from 3D printing. Moreover, these technologies save on time where models can be adjusted in real time to the corresponding feedback through virtual fittings and sewing.

== Design process ==
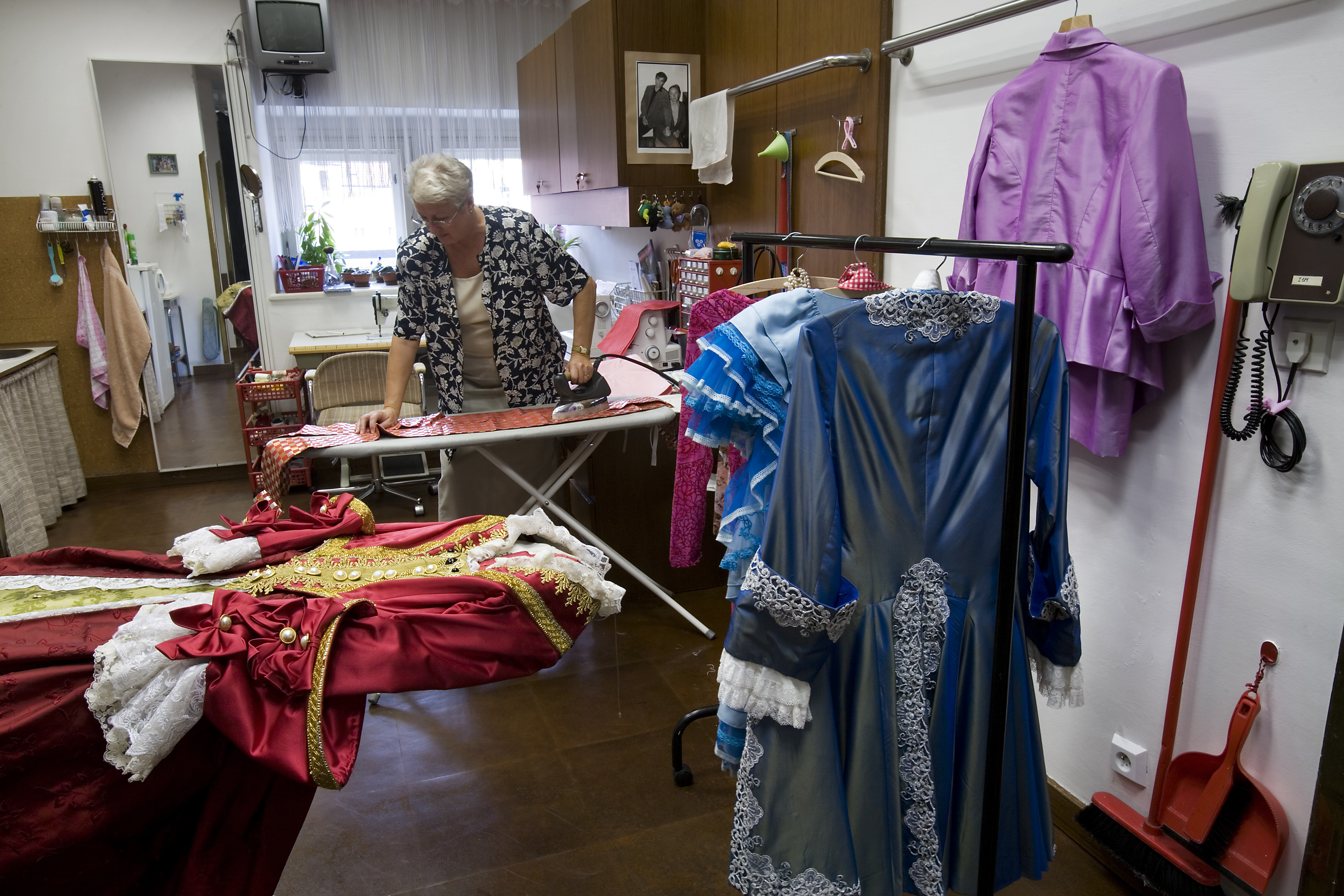
A woman creating in a costume workshop in Prague theater

The costume design process involves many steps and though they differ from genre to genre a basic method is commonly used.

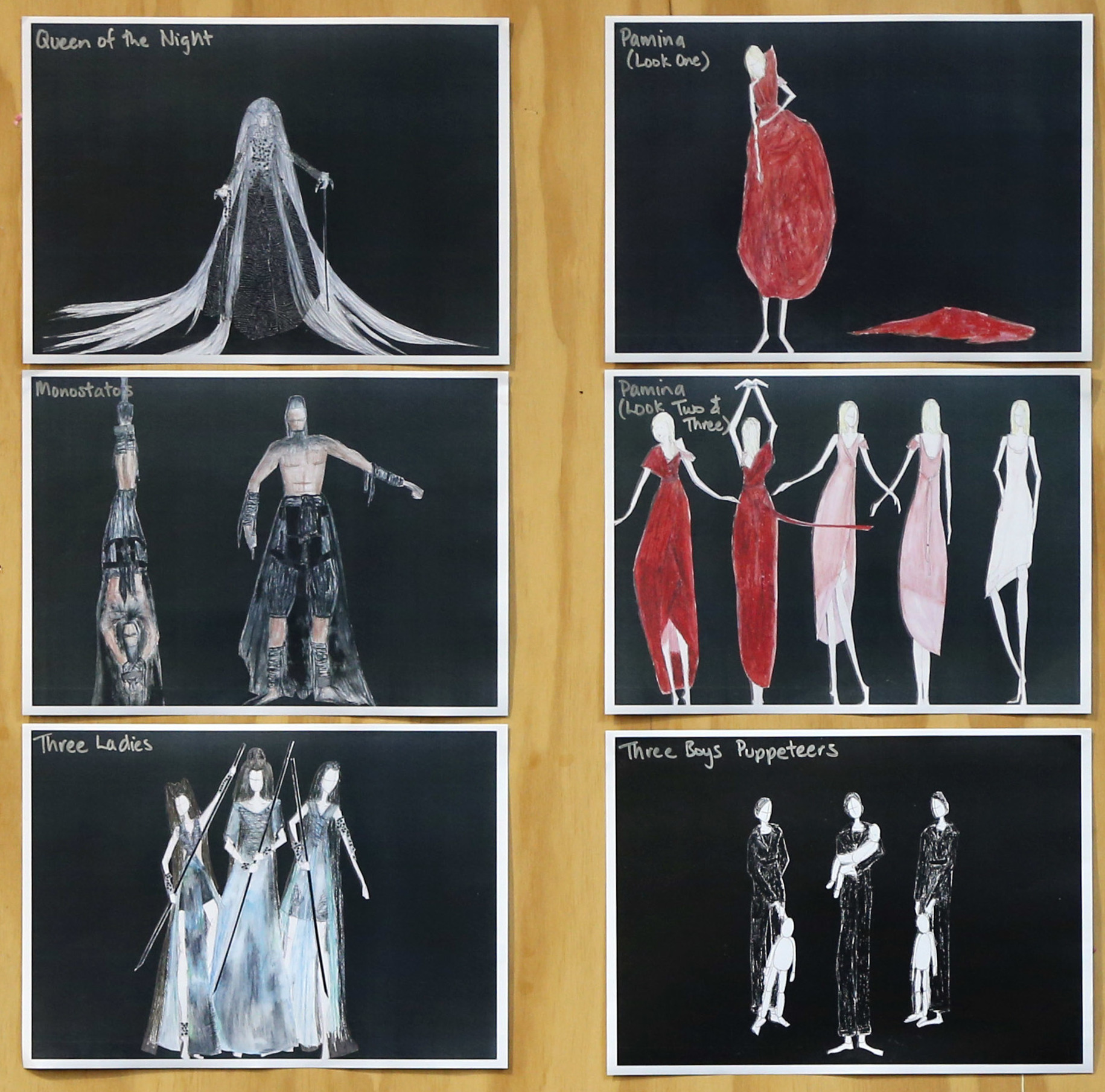
Costume design drawings by Lisa Holmes for 2016 New Zealand Opera production of Mozart's Magic Flute

1. Analysis: The first step is an analysis of the script, musical composition, choreography, etc. Costume parameters for the show are established and a rough costume plot is created. A costume plot outlines which character is in which scene, when the actors change, and what costumes are mentioned in the script.
2. Design collaboration: An important phase in the process is when all of the designers meet with the director. There must be a clear understanding of the overall show concept. The designers must all get on the same page with the director in terms of themes for the show and what messages they want the audience to get from the show.
3. Costume research: Once the director and designers are on the same page, the next step is for the Costume designer to gather research. Costume designers usually begin with research where they find resources to establish the world where the play takes place. This helps the designers establish the rules of the world and then in turn understand the characters better. The designer will then go into broad research about each character to try to establish their personalities though their costume.
4. Preliminary sketching and color layout: Once enough information is obtained, Costume designers begin by creating preliminary sketches. Beginning with very quick rough sketches the designer can get a basic idea for how the show will look put together and if the rules of the world are being maintained. The costume designer will then go into more detailed sketches and will figure out the specific costumes and colors for the character. Sketches help see the show as a whole without them having to spend too much time on them.
5. Final sketches: Once the costume designer and the director agree on the costumes and the ideas are fully flushed out, the designer will create final sketches. These are called renderings and are usually painted with watercolors or acrylic paints. These final sketches show what the designer wants the character to look like and the colors of the costume.

== Production process ==
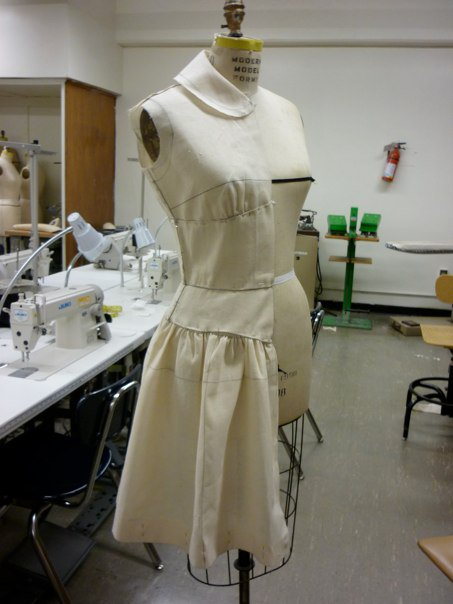
Example of draping muslin fabric onto a dress form

Once the show is designed, it is necessary to plan where the items will be sourced. There are four options. Garments can be:

- Pulled, which refers to searching through a costume shop's stock
- Rented
- Shopped/purchased
- Constructed, or also known as made to order.

There are two ways a garment can begin to be constructed; either pattern drafted or draped, and many times both methods will be used together. Pattern drafting begins by using a set of basic pattern blocks developed from the actor's measurements. They are drawn out on paper first, then transferred to fabric, and sewn together to test fit.

Draping involves manipulating a piece of fabric on a dress form or mannequin that has measurements closely related to the actor's. It is a process that takes a flat piece of cloth and shapes it to conform the fabric to a three-dimensional body by cutting and pinning.

Once constructed, however, the costume has not finished "working." A very important aspect of costumes is the ways they affect actors' performances and function within their settings. The very best costume designers build their original ideas after assessing the visual and spatial conditions of the costumes.

== See also ==
- Costume designer
