= The Man Who Changed His Name (play) =

1928 play

- Original language: English
- Written by: Edgar Wallace
- Genre: Mystery

Premiere
- Date: 14 March 1928
- Place: Apollo Theatre, London

The Man Who Changed His Name is a mystery play by the British writer Edgar Wallace, which was first staged in 1928. A young woman begins to suspect that her wealthy, respectable husband may be an escaped Canadian murderer.

Its initial run lasted for 77 performances at the Apollo Theatre in the West End. The original cast included James Raglan, Hartley Power and Dorothy Dickson.

== Adaptions ==
The play was the basis for three film adaptations. A British silent film The Man Who Changed His Name (1928) directed by A.V. Bramble and a British sound film The Man Who Changed His Name (1934) directed by Henry Edwards. In 1933 Mario Camerini directed an Italian version Giallo starring Assia Noris.

A radio adaption by Hugh Stewart was broadcast on 24 April 1943 as the fourth episode of the long-running BBC Radio drama strand Saturday Night Theatre.

== Bibliography ==
- Kabatchnik, Amnon. Blood on the Stage, 1925-1950: Milestone Plays of Crime, Mystery and Detection. Scarecrow Press, 2010.
