= Dorothy Black (actress) =

South African actress (1899–1985)

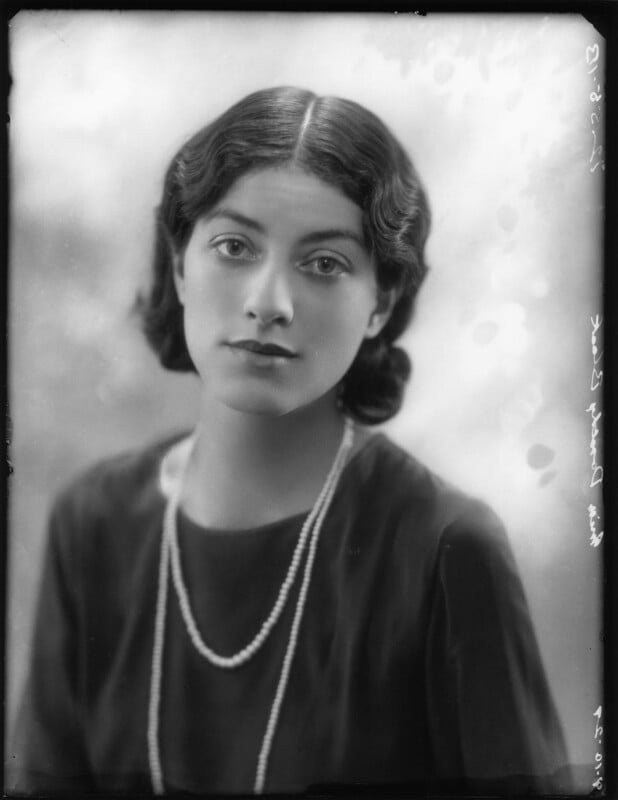
- Black in 1929
- Born: 18 September 1899; Johannesburg, South African Republic
- Died: 19 February 1985 (aged 85); London, England, UK
- Education: Royal Central School of Speech and Drama
- Occupation: Actress
- Years active: 1913–1973

Dorothy Black (18 September 1899 – 19 February 1985) was a South African-British actress.

== Biography ==
Black was born and raised in Johannesburg and attended St. Andrew's School for Girls. She went on to train at the Royal Central School of Speech and Drama in London.

She started her career appearing in Outward Bound, The Farmer's Wife, The Trojan Women and The Constant Nymph. Her first performance in London was in the play Blue Comet at the Royal Court Theatre. Other West End plays included Dear Brutus, Poison Pen, Six Characters in Search of an Author and The Brontes.

Black appeared in many TV appearances since the early BBC broadcasts at Alexandra Palace.

The National Portrait Gallery holds a photograph of her by Alexander Bassano.

== Selected filmography ==
- The Farmer's Wife (1928)
- Young Woodley (1928)
- Her Reputation (1931)
- Captivation (1931)
- The Admiral's Secret (1933)
- Imitation of Life (1934, uncredited)
- The Night Has Eyes (1942)
- Jane Eyre (1956)
- David Copperfield (1956)
