= Young Woodley (play) =

1925 play by John Van Druten

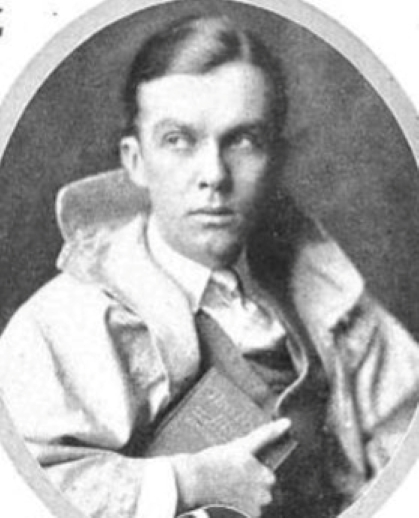
- Glenn Hunter as Young Woodley
- Original language: English
- Written by: John Van Druten
- First publication: 1926
- Subject: Student falls for housemaster's wife
- Genre: Drama
- Setting: A boarding house at an English public school

Premiere
- Date: 2 November 1925 (US); 5 March 1928 (UK)
- Place: Belmont Theatre (US); Savoy Theatre (UK)
- Directed by: Basil Dean (US/UK)
- Original run: 258 performances (US); 425 performances (UK)

Young Woodley is a 1925 play by John Van Druten. It is a drama in three acts with four scenes, two settings, and nine speaking parts. The action of the play takes place over several weeks at a fictional English public school. The story concerns a school prefect who falls in love with the wife of his housemaster. Because of its negative depiction of public school life, and its controversial subject matter, the play was banned from performance in the United Kingdom by the Lord Chamberlain in his capacity as theatrical Censor.

The play was first produced in the United States, by George C. Tyler and Basil Dean, with the latter also staging it. The sets were designed by Gladys Calthrop and built by Gates and Morange. Young Woodley starred Glenn Hunter, with Helen Gahagan and Herbert Bunston in support. It had tryouts in Boston and Buffalo during October 1925, and premiered on Broadway during November, where it ran until late May 1926, for 258 performances. It was included as one of the top ten works in Burns Mantle's The Best Plays of 1925-1926.

The ban on Young Woodley in Britain was lifted in February 1928, after the Lord Chamberlain viewed a performance at a private London theatrical club. This was the first time the Censor's ban had been reversed. The play premiered in the West End the next month. It ran there for over 400 performances, making a star of its lead Frank Lawton.

Van Druten wrote Young Woodley: A novel after the play, covering later events in the character's life, for UK publication in 1929. Young Woodley was adapted for a 1928 British silent film of the same name, which was never released. It was further adapted for a 1930 British movie, also called Young Woodley. There was also an adaptation for British television in March 1960.

== Characters ==
Characters are listed in order of appearance within their scope.

Lead

- Roger Woodley is 17, a shy sensitive poet and prefect, raised in Hampstead by his father and aunt.

Supporting

- Ainger is 19, handsome and athletic, house captain for Tree House, and Roger's friend.
- Laura Simmons is 28, from the Lake District, the shy, retiring wife of the much older Simmons.
- Frank Simmons is 50, a mathematics teacher and the sarcastic housemaster for Tree House.

Featured

- Cope is 14, who fags for the prefects at Tree House; nosy and naive.
- Vining is 18, wealthy, coarse and too well dressed; an exploiter of shop girls and house maids.
- Milner is 18, pleasant and agreeable, and easily led by others.
- Mr. Woodley is Roger's father, a widower who owns a soap manufacturing company.

Bit Player

- Parlormaid, called Maude, serves the Simmons.

== Synopsis ==
The settings are both within the Tree House at Mallowhurst School.

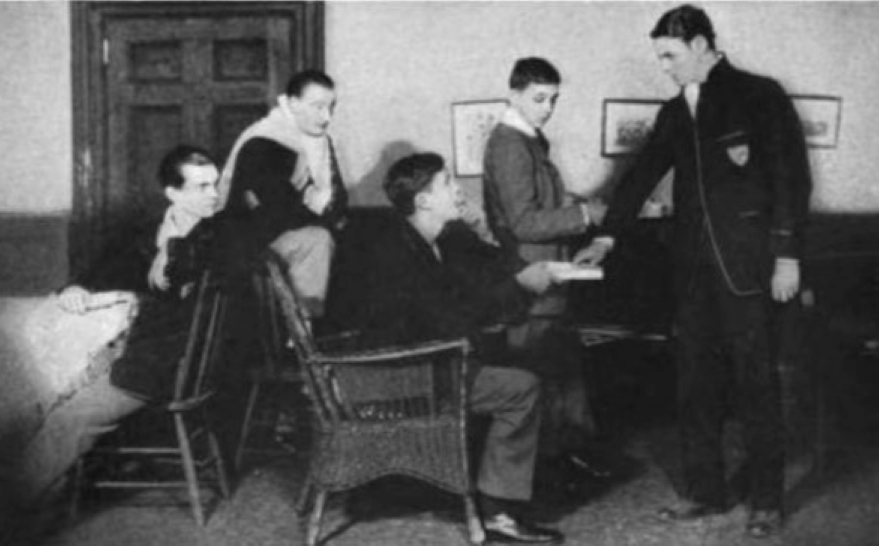

Act I (The prefects' room. About 5pm on a May afternoon.) Cope, behind in his fagging duties, is teased by Vining for asking about Riley, a student who was just expelled. Vining baits Cope, but Ainger puts a stop to it and sends Cope off. The prefects commiserate over the headmaster's lecture on moral purity following the expulsion. Woodley comes in, having been lectured by Simmons over a risqué poem he wrote for the school paper. He and Vining speculate Riley's downfall was the dark-haired maid at Plunkett's House. Vining decries the suppression of natural instincts suggested by the headmaster's lecture. Ainger and Woodley dispute with him, until Milner catches Cope peeking in the window. He is hustled into the room, chided for snooping, and sent off to wash up the tea things. The prefects talk of a red-haired shop girl who is amenable to Sunday afternoon walks. Vining and Milner leave; Ainger and Woodley discuss Vining's position on natural instincts. Ainger confesses he has not done much with girls but suspects Vining has. Woodley has trouble reconciling romance with "beastliness". He is attracted to girls of his own social class, but cannot think of them as objects of desire. Ainger counsels him to take it easy, there is no rush to get involved at age 17. Both are startled by Mrs. Simmons, who complains about the younger boys traipsing through shrubbery. Ainger promises to deal with them. He goes out to monitor P.D., (Note: Prefects' Detention: a punishment period for minor infractions, handed out by the prefects to lower classmen.) leaving Laura Simmons and Roger Woodley to talk of poetry. They are reciting Swinburne when her husband enters, looking for Ainger. He is sarcastic towards Woodley, mocking his poem and describing Swinburne as "intellectual measles". Mrs. Simmons hustles him out. Vining returns and immediately speculates about the Simmons' personal life, causing Woodley to exit abruptly. (Curtain)

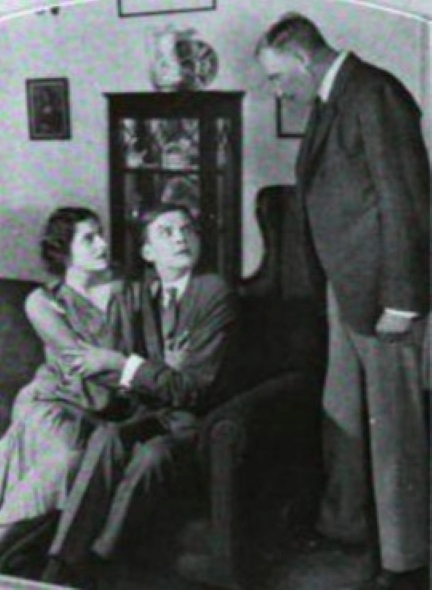

Act II (Mrs. Simmons drawing-room. Three weeks later, about 4pm.) Simmons, after grading papers and gloating over student mistakes, realizes it is Laura's birthday. He apologizes for forgetting the date and gives her a perfunctory kiss on the cheek. They discuss a strange atmosphere that has settled over the school since Riley's expulsion. Laura is chafing at the pettiness of public schools, and sympathizes with the students. Simmons, however, puts the malaise down to lack of respect, especially by the prefects and Woodley in particular. Laura suggests Simmons should be more human with the boys. He rejects playing down to popularity. Laura declines his request to watch a house cricket match, as she has invited Ainger and Woodley to tea. Simmons suggests they will be bored. Laura responds with a burst of emotion, ruing that she married a schoolmaster and not a man. Simmons goes off to cricket. Maude announces Woodley. Ainger could not come; he had to substitute for an injured cricket player. Laura and Woodley talk of poetry again; he reads her a love poem. They were both only children. Laura asks to call him Roger, which he allows. She mentions having met Simpson while he was on a walking tour. Laura apologizes for her husbands rudeness and explains that is why she never goes to school functions. Being shy, she feels everyone must think she is like him. Roger assures her that everyone likes her but wonders why... "Why I married him?" she completes the thought then breaks down crying. Roger is flustered, more so when she touches his hand briefly. He tries to leave, but her vulnerability and loneliness keep him. He blurts out that he loves her and they embrace on the sofa, kissing passionately. But Simmons surprises them, and is taken aback by Woodley's challenge. Laura sends Woodley out. She insists this was the only encounter and it was her fault. When he threatens to expel Woodley, she threatens to leave him. Stymied, he agrees to wait while she works on Roger to forget her. (Curtain)

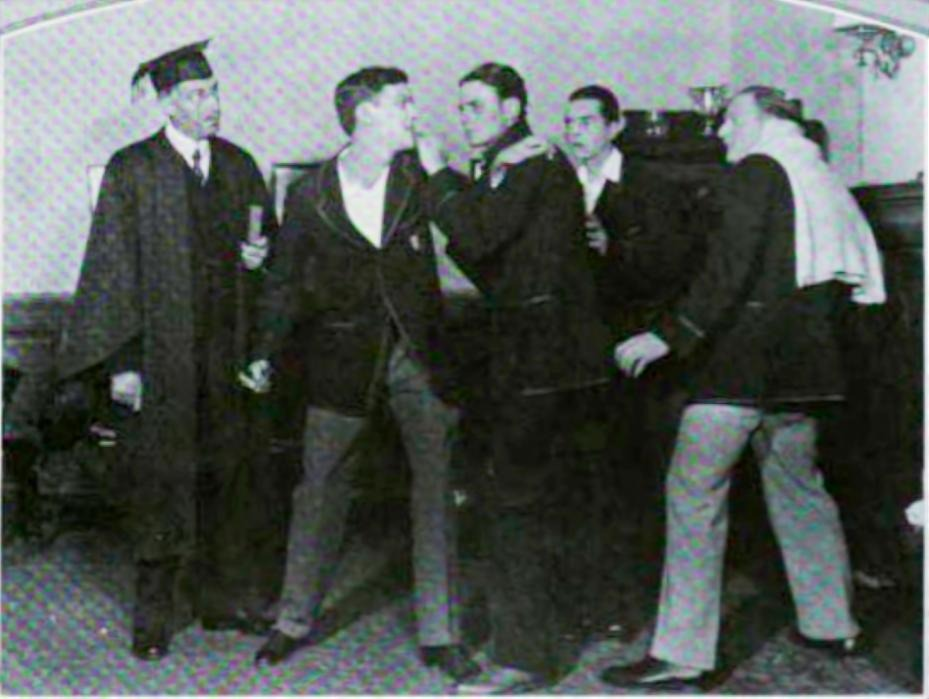

Act III (Scene 1:Same as Act I. Two days later.) Ainger, Vining, and Milner try to figure out why both Mr. Simmons and Woodley are on edge. Cope tells Woodley that Vining suggested he ask Mrs. Simmons about Riley, who was expelled. Woodley confesses to Ainger that he went with a shop girl to the woods and felt beastly about it afterwards. Woodley confronts Vining about Cope, but becomes enraged when Vining rags him about Mrs. Simmons. He takes a knife from the tea things and starts towards Vining, but is stopped by Ainger. Mr. Simmons comes in and demands an explanation. Woodley taunts him, saying Mr. Simmons has won and can have him expelled now. Ainger and Simmons take Woodley off to the sick room. (Quick Curtain)

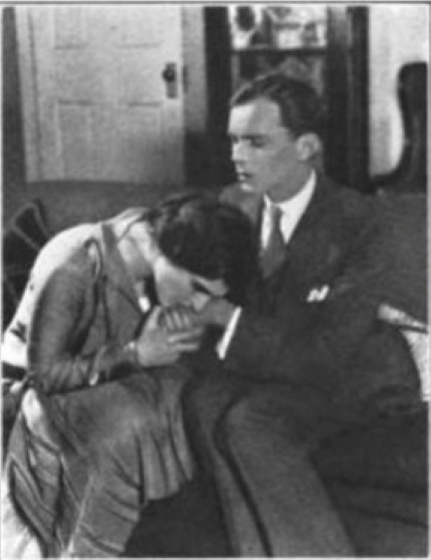

Act III (Scene 2:Same as Act II. The following afternoon.) Mr. Woodley has arrived and has spoken with the headmaster and with Simmons. Alone with the latter, he challenges him for the complete story, and gradually comes to understand that the housemaster wanted to get rid of his son because of his wife's affection for him. Laura meets Mr. Woodley and explains the entire situation was her fault, not Roger's. When Mr. Woodley meets up with his son, they agree that Roger should come into the business with his father. Mr. Woodley reveals what Laura told him, causing Roger to breakdown. He begs his father to hasten their departure as soon as possible. Ainger calls to Woodley from the window; they shake hands in parting. Laura comes to say goodbye to Roger and apologize for what she said the other day. She had to do it, but admits she loves him and does not want him to be bitter about love because of her. They embrace, she leaves, and Mr. Woodley returns to take Roger home. (Curtain)

== Original production ==
=== Background ===
John Van Druten was a young university lecturer when his first play, The Return Half, was performed by members of the RADA Ex-Students' Club on 5 October 1924. John Gielgud played the leading character, a student and would-be poet whose businessman stepfather ships him off to Australia. It attracted a decent review from a newspaper critic who judged Van Druten as a playwright to watch. Van Druten's second play, Young Woodley, however, fell afoul of the Lord Chamberlain, who banned it from performance in the United Kingdom. Basil Dean had already purchased the play's British rights, and George C. Tyler the North American rights. Tyler decided to produce Young Woodley, and hired Basil Dean, who was already in New York, to stage it. Glenn Hunter, who had been touring in Merton of the Movies, which George C. Tyler had co-produced, would play the title role, while the female lead would be filled by Helen Gahagan.

=== Cast ===
Cast for the Boston and Buffalo tryouts and through the Broadway run.
Role	Actor	Dates	Notes and sources
Roger Woodley	Glenn Hunter	5 Oct 1925 – 29 May 1926	
Ainger	Edward Crandall	5 Oct 1925 – 29 May 1926	
Laura Simmons	Helen Gahagan	5 Oct 1925 – 29 May 1926	
Frank Simmons	Herbert Bunston	5 Oct 1925 – 29 May 1926	
Cope	George Walcott	5 Oct 1925 – 29 May 1926	Walcott was the youngest cast member, having turned fourteen shortly before the production began.
Vining	Geoffrey John Harwood	5 Oct 1925 – 29 May 1926	More than one reviewer suggested Harwood appeared too mature for this role.
Milner	John Gerard	5 Oct 1925 – 29 May 1926	
Mr. Woodley	Grant Stewart	5 Oct 1925 – 29 May 1926	
Parlormaid	Esther Bell	5 Oct 1925 – 30 Jan 1926	
Parlormaid	Willa Frederic	1 Feb 1926 – 29 May 1926	

=== Tryouts ===
The play had its first tryout, a two week engagement, starting 5 October 1925, at the Hollis Street Theatre in Boston. The critic for The Boston Globe observed that the play was better suited for an audience that took drama more seriously than the usual entertainment seekers. They complained about the performers being inaudible past the first few rows, but praised the character sketches and thought the dialogue very natural.

From Boston, the production went to Buffalo, New York, for a week-long run at the Majestic Theatre, starting 19 October 1925. Here the local reviewer was more enthusiastic, saying that "no better show will be seen in Buffalo this season", and that unlike some trial works played there "needed no patching up". They judged the cast was uniformly strong, but singled out Glenn Hunter, Helen Gahagan, Herbert Bunston, and Edward Crandall for special mention.

=== Broadway premiere and reception ===
“The Lord Chamberlain decided that 'Young Woodley' was not fit for British audiences. I have a horrid suspicion that American audiences are not fit for 'Young Woodley'.”
– Alexander Woollcott on first night reaction

Young Woodley had its Broadway premiere at the Belmont Theatre on Monday, 2 November 1925. Arthur Pollock saluted Glenn Hunter's performance, saying he at last had a character with deeper emotions than usual. Pollock was positive about the play in general, except for the older woman responding romantically to the young man. He also felt the plays ideas, grounded in English school life, might not appeal to American audiences. Another reviewer, more appreciative of Young Woodley's self-sacrificing heroine, contrasted Van Druten's treatment of this theme with that of Ernest Vajda in Fata Morgana, which had played Broadway two seasons earlier. The critic for the Brooklyn Standard Union touched upon a dichotomy in audience appreciation: the play could be regarded as either comedy or tragedy. Alexander Woollcott also raised this point; American audiences, conditioned by such plays as Seventeen by Booth Tarkington, regarded youthful romance as callow. They reacted to Young Woodley's tender scenes with nervous laughter.

Burns Mantle was in no doubt that the play was neither tragedy nor comedy, but sentimental drama. He felt Glenn Hunter, who had received top billing, was superb in portraying the overly serious youth shattered by the failure of his first romance. The New York Times reviewer was just as sure that it was comedy, of uneven quality and "indifferent workmanship", but redeemed by the final scene where Glenn Hunter displayed "bravery, dignity, modesty and manliness" that "drew immediate response" from the audience.

=== Broadway closing ===
Young Woodley closed at the Belmont Theatre on 29 May 1926, after 258 performances. Burns Mantle included Young Woodley among the top ten plays of the season for The Best Plays of 1925-26.

== UK production ==
=== Private performances ===
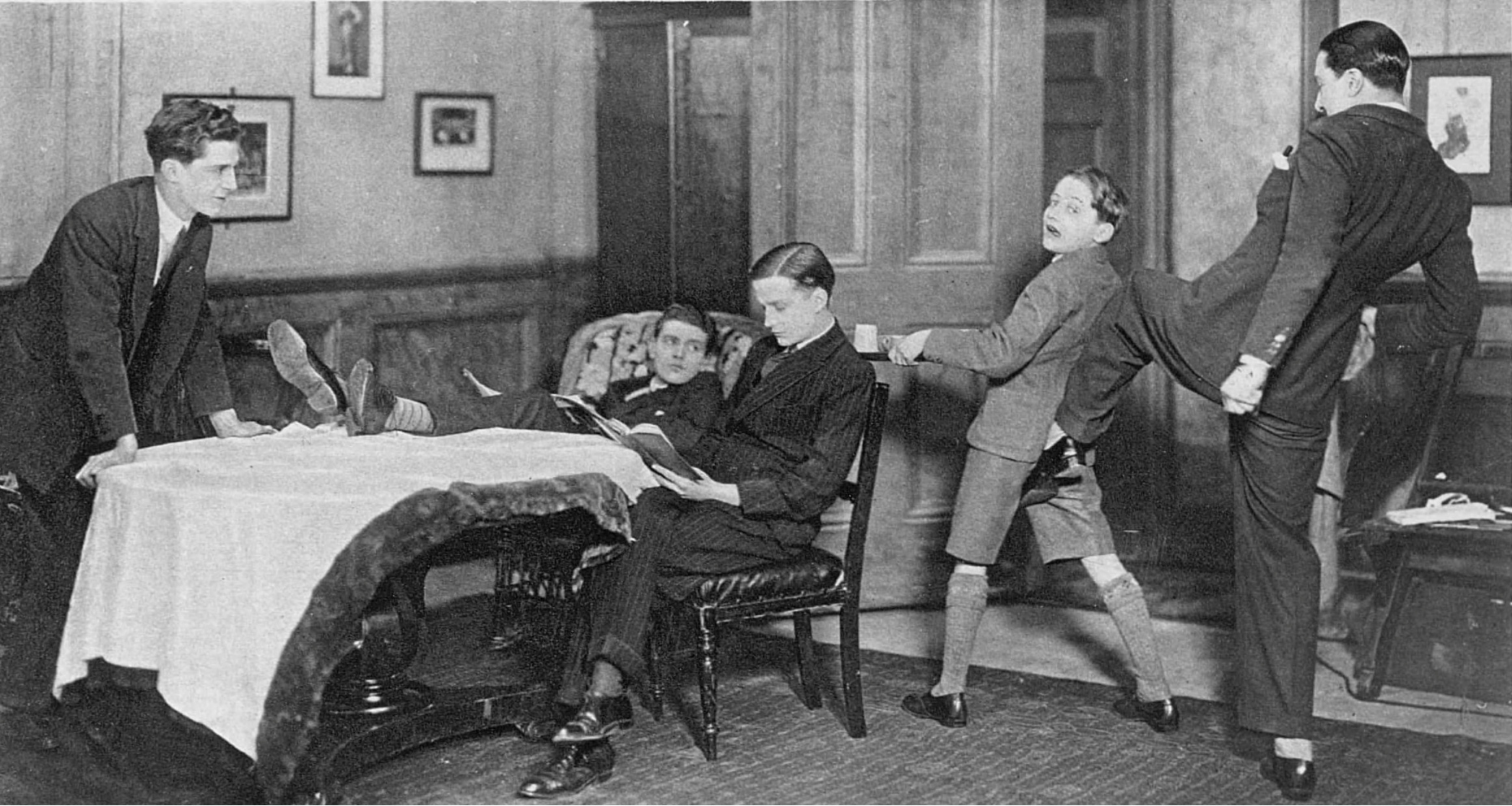

Henry Oscar told a London theatrical columnist in December 1927 that Basil Dean would produce Young Woodley at the private Arts Theatre in the next few months. This was to be a joint effort with the 300 Club branch of the Stage Society. The Arts Theatre Club and the 300 Club, as private members clubs, were exempt from the ban laid on public performances of Young Woodley. The production opened on 12 February 1928, for a one-night performance at the New Theatre. The critic for the Daily Sketch found the entire story unbelievable, but did say Frank Lawton almost made Roger Woodley "credible". They ended by saying "I am surprised at, though by no means displeased by, the Censor's ban".

Young Woodley then moved over to the Arts Theatre the next night for a week-long engagement. Iris Barry called it "a play of obvious sincerity" and said it highlighted the unreasonableness "of a censorship from which there is no appeal". She described it as telling of a "calf-love" without the exploitation found in Fata Morgana. She had praise for Basil Dean's direction, and the performances of Frank Lawton, Kathleen O'Regan, David Horne as Mr. Simmons, Henry Mollison as Vining, Aubrey Mather as Mr. Woodley, and Tony Halfpenny as Cope. Hubert Griffith also focused his review on the censorship, saying "the play, with certain rare and lovely moments in it, is always on the level of being worth seeing". He cited the same performers as Iris Barry, and added to their names those of Derrick De Marney and Jack Hawkins as the other prefects.

=== Lifting the Ban ===
Basil Dean had been in discussions with the Lord Chamberlain, at that time the Earl of Cromer, for two years. The Lord Chamberlain had read the play three times and maintained he could not license it. However, Dean persisted and invited the Lord Chamberlain to view the play, as he felt it would give a different impression.

The Lord Chamberlain viewed a performance of Young Woodley at the Arts Theatre, and sent a note to Basil Dean announcing the ban was lifted, "In consequence of the delicacy and restraint with which this play has been acted", and granted a license for its public performance. This was "believed to be the first time that the Lord Chamberlain had reversed their decision after banning a play".

=== West End premiere ===
Young Woodley had its West End premiere on 5 March 1928, at the Savoy Theatre. There were two cast changes, as Frances Doble took over the role of Mrs. Simmons and Charles Mortimer that of Mr. Woodley. The Daily Telegraph reviewer thought the play worked well as a story of a young man's first love for an older woman, but felt the character of Mr. Simmons encompassed too many ills to properly represent an indictment of the house system at public schools. Kathleen O'Regan returned to the role of Laura Simmons on 9 July 1928. Having moved over to the Court Theatre during its long run, Young Woodley ended with 425 performances on Saturday, 2 March 1929, before going on tour.

== Adaptations ==
=== Literary ===
- Young Woodley: A novel after the play (1929) - Van Druten expanded upon Young Woodley's life after the events of the play. Published by G. P. Putnam's Sons in the UK during February 1929.

=== Film ===
- Young Woodley (1928) - directed by Thomas Bentley, was made at Cricklewood Studios but never released.
- Young Woodley (1930) - British International Pictures, directed by Thomas Bentley, with Frank Lawton reprising his stage role. It also starred Madeleine Carroll and Sam Livesey. The film is notable for its staginess and was not a success with audiences.

=== Television ===
- BBC Sunday-Night Play (1960) - Episode "Young Woodley" was broadcast on 20 March 1960, starring Jeremy Spenser, with William Devlin and Jane Wenham.

== Bibliography ==
- Burns Mantle (ed). The Best Plays of 1925-26 And The Year Book Of The Drama In America. Dodd, Mead and Company, 1926.
- John Van Druten. Young Woodley: A Play in Three Acts. Simon and Schuster, 1926.
- Cody, Gabrielle H.; Sprinchorn, Evert, eds. (2007). The Columbia encyclopedia of modern drama. New York: Columbia university press. ISBN 9780231140324.
- Kershaw, Baz, ed. (2004). The Cambridge history of British theatre (1. publ. ed.). Cambridge: Cambridge Univ. Press. ISBN 9780521651325.
- Richards, Jeffrey. The Age of the Dream Palace: Cinema and Society in Britain, 1930-1939. Routledge & Kegan Paul, 1984.
