= Blue Comet (play) =

1926 play by Eden Phillpotts

- Written by: Eden Phillpotts
- Original language: English
- Genre: Comedy

Premiere
- Date premiered: 11 September 1926
- Place premiered: Repertory Theatre, Birmingham

Blue Comet is a comedy play by the British writer Eden Phillpotts. The plot revolves around the differing reactions of the characters when the earth is threatened by an incoming comet.

It premiered at the Birmingham Repertory Theatre in September 1926. The following year it enjoyed a run of thirty seven performances at the Royal Court Theatre in London's West End between 23 February and 26 March 1927. The original London cast included Paul Cavanagh, Eliot Makeham, Clarence Blakiston, Edward Chapman, Minnie Rayner, Cecily Byrne and Dorothy Black.

It was not well received in The Drama, saying it had little subtlety or art and "the author is so bent on manufacturing obvious and crude witticisms, whether relevant to the theme or not, that nothing resembling a serious idea is ever allowed to come to birth."

== Bibliography ==
- Wearing, J.P. The London Stage 1920-1929: A Calendar of Productions, Performers, and Personnel. Rowman & Littlefield, 2014.
