= Breakages, Limited =

Fictional corporation in a play by George Bernard Shaw

Breakages, Limited is a fictional corporation in George Bernard Shaw's 1928 play The Apple Cart. It has acquired a monopoly of all repair trades. "Breakages" is the focus of a critique of capitalism, shown as exerting undue political influence while hampering beneficial technological progress to protect its interests.

== Shaw's Preface ==
Set in the then-future year of 1962, Shaw wrote The Apple Cart in a period of Conservative government in Britain, before the Welfare State reforms that followed World War II.

In his Preface to the play, Shaw referred to "Breakages, Limited" in the context of "the mischief done by our system of private Capitalism in setting up huge vested interests in destruction, waste, and disease." He wrote that the name of Breakages came to him as a result of a visit many years earlier to the inventor and playwright Alfred Warwick Gattie, who demonstrated to him a device that would enable smooth transfer of crates of glass lightbulbs in transit, minimising breakage. The development of this device, Gattie had told him, was opposed by the vested interests of "The glass blowers whose employment was threatened ... the industry of repairing our railway trucks ... and the railway porters ... He fought them undauntedly, but they were too strong for him," and the invention was never adopted.

Shaw depicted Breakages as representing "plutocracy," which subordinates democratic government to its power, to the extent that even socialist politicians "no longer dare even to talk of nationalizing any industry" which can return a profit for the "plutocrats" or attract subsidies for them. "Not until Breakages is itself broken will it cease to have a message for us."

== Portrayal in The Apple Cart ==
In the play, Breakages is "the biggest industrial corporation in the country [Britain]." In Act I, Lysistrata, the "Powermistress General" in charge of energy supply, describes how Breakages buys up and suppresses any new invention that threatens its interests, causing energy to cost "twice as much as it should." She shows how the company influences government work: "If I attempt to fight them, I shall be hounded out of public life." In Act II King Magnus threatens to abdicate in favour of his son Robert, in whose opinion "the country... is governed by Breakages, Limited", and to enter politics himself and oppose Breakages. Shaw suggested that a powerful individual can resist Breakages more effectively than democratic politics can.

== Critical comment ==
=== Influence on politics ===
A "devastating satire," The Apple Cart depicts the de facto political power of "Breakages" without offering a credible prospect that this could be overcome. The account in the Preface of the fate of Gattie's invention fails to convincingly "demonstrate the power of corrupt plutocracy over industry and politics," as the culprits appear to have been rather "organized labour and unimaginative officialdom."

The theme of the "businessman's hand" behind the government, embodied here as "Breakages," also appears in the character of the armaments maker Mr Undershaft in his Major Barbara and in that of the businessman Alfred Mangan in Heartbreak House.

=== Hindrance of technological progress ===
Brian Winston has described "Breakages, Limited" as a "poetic version" of factors other than cultural conservatism that tend to impede technological progress. This has been termed "the 'law' of the suppression of radical potential."

== In other works ==
Mary Lou and Archie, in Robert A. Heinlein's short story "Let There Be Light," debate the validity of the picture symbolised by "Breakages Ltd." of planned obsolescence and corporate resistance to innovation. (Note: In this passage Heinlein attributes "Breakages" to Back to Methuselah rather than The Apple Cart.) The name is again used to represent obsolescence in an account of marketing of computer software, where it is sometimes implied that "the computer user, as well as the software, will be obsolete if s/he does not buy the latest product."
