= Adelaide Phillpotts =

English novelist, poet and playwright (1896–1993)

- Adelaide Phillpotts
- Born: Mary Adelaide Eden Phillpotts; 23 April 1896; Ealing, London, England
- Died: 4 June 1993 (aged 97); Poughill, Cornwall, England
- Occupation: Writer
- Writing career
- Pen name: Adelaide Ross

Mary Adelaide Eden Ross (née Phillpotts; 23 April 1896 – 4 June 1993) was an English novelist, poet and playwright. She married at the age of 55 leaving behind her father who had controlled their incestuous relationship.

== Life ==
Phillpotts was born in Ealing, London and went to a local boarding school and then to Grassendale School in Southbourne, Dorset. Later she studied social care at Bedford College.

As a 12-year-old girl, she looked up to her slightly older Torquay neighbour Agatha Miller (later known to the world as Agatha Christie). Her father, the successful and prolific writer Eden Phillpotts, was impressed enough by Agatha's early work to help her with it, but at that point unsuccessfully. Amongst other literary celebrities who visited the Phillpotts family were Thomas Hardy and Arnold Bennett.

Eden Phillpotts treated his daughter as an extension of himself. Her long-held secret, revealed in an interview in 1976 long after her father had died, was that the relationship had been incestuous. She contrasted his obsessive, controlling "love" for her by saying that she loved him too, but only as a father. However, she was compliant to his demands.

Phillpotts was treated cruelly by her father, but he would also write her sonnets. James Y. Dayananda notes that she published seven similar books where the lead character is not an ambitious feminist but is instead a woman based in the home. Despite being a sensitive woman, her heroine is beginning to realise that her gender's role may not always be submissive. The books, A Marriage, The Gallant Heart, The Round of Life, Our Little Town, From Jane to John, The Fosterling, Stubborn Earth were published between 1928 and 1951.

In 1938, the three act comedy play, Yellow Sands that she had written with her father in 1926 was made into a film. The film starred Marie Tempest, Belle Chrystall and Wilfrid Lawson.

In 1951, at the age of 55, and strongly against her father's wishes, she married American bookseller Nicholas Ross (died 1967). From that time on, she published under the name Adelaide Ross, and her father cut off all communication with her until his death in 1960.

She died in Poughill near Bude in Cornwall, and is buried in Morwenstow.

The National Portrait Gallery holds two photographs of Phillpotts, both taken in 1926 and donated by Pinewood Studios via the Victoria and Albert Museum in 1989.

== Selected works ==
- Illyrion and other poems, 1916
- Man, A Fable, 1922, Constable London
- Yellow Sands; a comedy in three acts by her and Eden Phillpotts, 1926 later a book and a film in 1938
- A Marriage, 1928
- Tomek, the sculptor, 1927
- Buy a broom : comedy in three acts, 1929
- The Good Old Days, 1932, a play co-written with her father
- West country plays: Buy a broom and A cup of happiness by her and Eden Phillpotts, 1933
- My Lady's Mill, 1935, a play co-written with her father
- Akhnaton : a play
- The Gallant Heart, 1939
- The Round of Life, 1939
- Our Little Town, 1942
- From Jane to John, 1943
- The Fosterling, 1949
- Stubborn Earth, 1951
- Panorama of the world by Adelaide Ross, 1969 (travel – Hale, ISBN 0709108737)
- Letters to Nicholas Ross by John Cowper Powys, selected by Nicholas Ross (bookseller) and Adelaide Ross, edited by Arthur Uphill, 1971 (Bertram Rota, ISBN 0854000070)
- Reverie: an autobiography, 1981 (Hale, ISBN 0709188226)
- Village love : a country romance by Adelaide Phillpotts Ross (1988 reprint, Rigby & Lewis, ISBN 1869887662)
