= The Admiral's Secret =

1934 British film by Guy Newall

- Opening titles
- Directed by: Guy Newall
- Written by: Harry Fowler Mear; Terence Egan
- Based on: The Admiral's Secret; 1928 play by Cyril Campion and Edward Dignon
- Produced by: Julius Hagen
- Starring: Edmund Gwenn; James Raglan; Aubrey Mather; Dorothy Black
- Cinematography: Ernest Palmer
- Edited by: Lister Laurance
- Music by: William Trytel
- Production company: Real Art Productions
- Distributed by: Radio Pictures
- Release date: 6 August 1934
- Running time: 63 minutes
- Country: United Kingdom
- Language: English

The Admiral's Secret is a 1934 British comedy film directed by Guy Newall and starring Edmund Gwenn, James Raglan and Dorothy Black. It was written by Harry Fowler Mear and Terence Egan based on the 1928 play of the same title by Cyril Campion.

== Premise ==
In Devon a gang of Spanish criminals search for a trove of stolen gems hidden by a retired British Admiral.

== Cast ==
- Edmund Gwenn as Admiral Fitzporter
- James Raglan as Frank Bruce
- Hope Davy as Pamela Fitzporter
- Aubrey Mather as Captain Brooke
- Edgar Driver as Sam Hawkins
- Abraham Sofaer as Don Pablo y Gonzales
- Dorothy Black as Donna Teresa
- Andreas Malandrinos as Guido d'Elvira
- D. J. Williams as Questa
- Agnes Imlay as Mrs. Pinchcliffe

== Production ==
It was filmed at Twickenham Studios with sets were designed by James Carter. A quota quickie, it was released by the American company RKO Pictures.

== Reception ==
Kine Weekly wrote: "Guy Newall's hands appear to have lost a little of their conning, for his direction lacks decision. Comedy and drama are not too surely defined and the overlapping does not reflect too favourably on the quality of the entertainment. In fact, it is Edmund Gwenn that holds the show together and enables the simple situations, with their obvious humour and naive thrills, to register. The film has its weaknesses, but these hould not prevent it from proving a satisfactory supporting offering for an industrial public."

The Daily Film Renter wrote: "Comedy-drama, with Edmund Gwenn as Admiral owner of jewelled star coveted by shady dagoes, whose attempts to steal it form the plot. Much action devoted to 'face at the window' business, screams, and the usual sensational trappings of melodrama. Edmund Gwenn's clever portrayal as the Admiral is excellent, and one of the most interesting aspects of the subject. Film rates as average quota fare."
