= Yellow Sands (film) =

- Trade advertisement
- Directed by: Herbert Brenon
- Written by: Rodney Ackland; Michael Barringer
- Based on: Yellow Sands (play) by Adelaide Phillpotts; Eden Phillpotts
- Starring: Marie Tempest; Belle Chrystall; Wilfrid Lawson; Robert Newton
- Release date: 8 July 1938
- Running time: 68 minutes
- Country: United Kingdom
- Language: English
- Budget: £26,602

Yellow Sands is a 1938 British comedy drama film directed by Herbert Brenon and starring Marie Tempest, Belle Chrystall, Wilfrid Lawson and Robert Newton. It was written by Rodney Ackland and Michael Barringer based on the 1926 play Yellow Sands by Adelaide and Eden Phillpotts.

== Premise ==
A rich dying woman's relatives are about to be disappointed by the contents of her will.

== Cast ==
- Marie Tempest as Jennifer Varwell
- Belle Chrystall as Lydia Blake
- Wilfrid Lawson as Richard Varwell
- Robert Newton as Joe Varwell
- Patrick Barr as Arthur Varwell
- Amy Veness as Mary Varwell
- Coral Browne as Emma Copplestone
- Drusilla Wills as Minnie Masters
- Muriel Johnston as Nellie Masters
- Edward Rigby as Tom Major

== Reception ==
The Monthly Film Bulletin wrote: "The picture is rich in dialogue and characterisation and, though leisurely, is never slow. It is, of course, an adaptation of the popular Phillpotts play and the director and editors have been so anxious to break up the stage form that they have sometimes cut up scenes which would have been better cinema shown as a whole. The full flavoured characters are given turns rather than allowed to find their own niche in the picture."

Kine Weekly wrote: "Acting, direction and atmosphere are flawless. Excellent general booking, quality light-entertainment of universal appeal. ... Clever, human story, delightful comedy situations, big cast, feminine angle, and box-office title."
