= 49th Street Theatre =

Broadway theater and cinema (1921–1940)

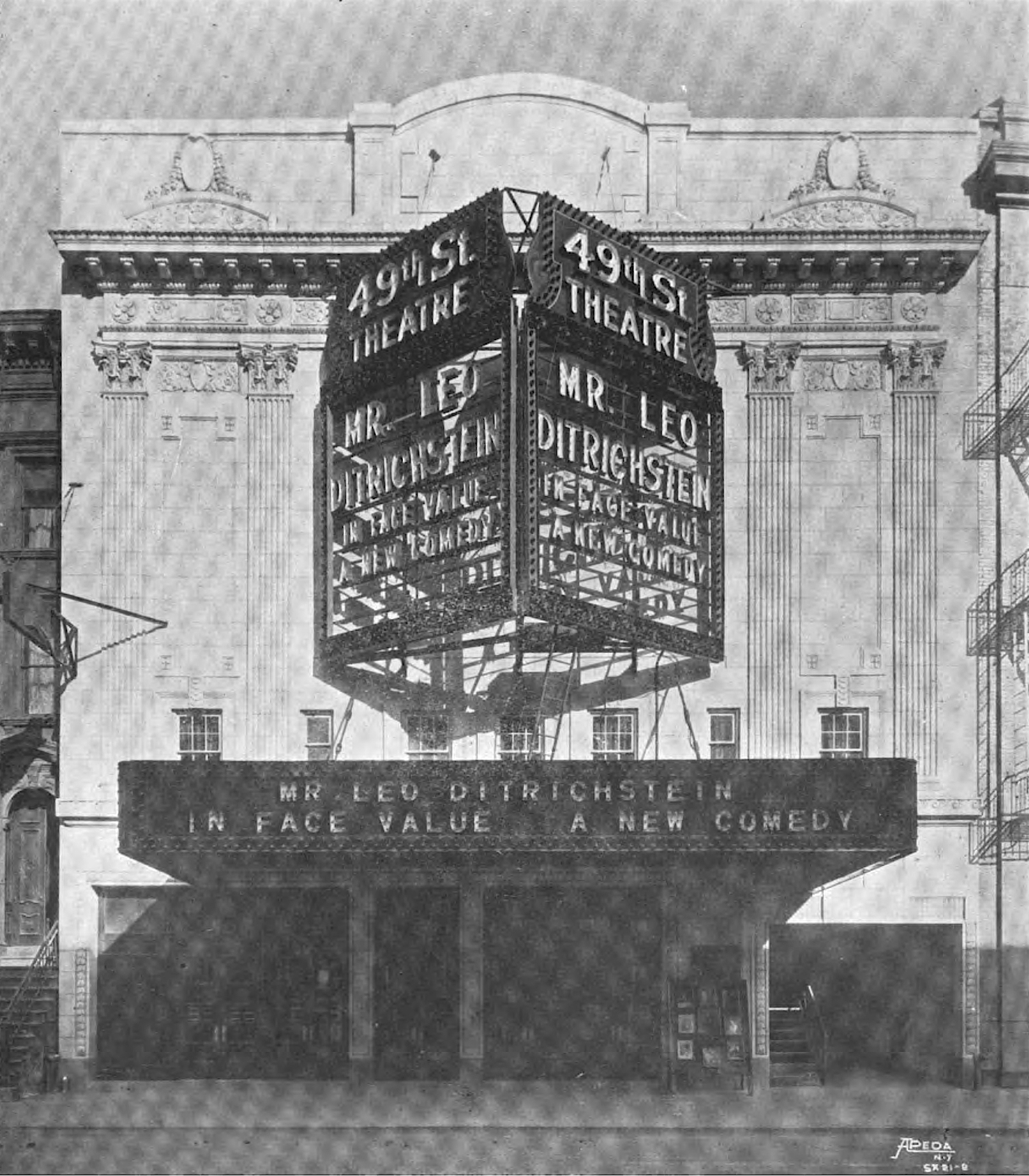
- The 49th Street Theatre in December 1921
- Former names: Cinema 49 (1938–1940)
- Address: 235 West 49th Street; Manhattan, New York City; United States
- Coordinates: 40°45′42″N 73°59′08″W
- Capacity: 750
- Type: Broadway theatre

Construction
- Opened: December 26, 1921
- Closed: 1940
- Demolished: December 1940
- Architect: Herbert J. Krapp

The 49th Street Theatre (later renamed Cinema 49) was a Broadway theater at 235 West 49th Street in the Theater District of Manhattan in New York City. It was built by the Shubert family in 1921, though they lost the theatre in the Great Depression. The building became a cinema for a short time before its ultimate demolition in 1940.

== Design ==
The 750-seat neo-Renaissance style theater was designed by the architect Herbert J. Krapp for the Shubert Organization, with building by the O'Day Construction Company. The exterior walls were marble with pilasters and classically designed cornices. It had a spacious lobby on the orchestra level, with lounging and smoking rooms on the mezzanine level. The interior walls were covered in oak panels. The fabric for the chairs and drop curtain were blue. It had one single balcony and no boxes.

== History ==
It opened on December 26, 1921, with a performance of Face Value, a comedy by Laurence Grass. The theater premiered Gypsy Jim, a play by Oscar Hammerstein II, in 1924. In 1927, the American premiere of Fallen Angels was staged at the 49th Street Theatre, featuring a cast with Fay Bainter, Estelle Winwood, Gerald Hamer, Eileen Beldon, and Luis Alberni.

Although it had some popular productions, such as the revue La Chauve-Souris and the Aaron Hoffman play Give and Take, the venue was one of the Shuberts' less successful locations. They lost control of the property during the Great Depression. It continued to operate as a playhouse until April 1938 under leadership of the Federal Theatre Project. The final theatrical performance at the venue was a production of Henrik Ibsen's The Wild Duck. The venue was then converted to show movies and reopened as Cinema 49. The cinema was also unsuccessful and closed in 1940; the building was demolished that December.
