= Belle Chrystall =

British actress (1910–2003)

- Born: 25 April 1910; Preston, Lancashire; United Kingdom
- Died: 7 June 2003 (aged 93); Surrey, England; United Kingdom
- Years active: 1930–1950

Belle Chrystall (25 April 1910 – 7 June 2003) was a British actress who appeared in a number of leading roles in British films during the 1930s. She was born in Preston, Lancashire in 1910. She came to London and after appearing on stage was given a minor part in a film A Warm Corner, directed by Victor Saville but she was given no more work after that. The filming of Hindle Wakes led her to apply for the part of Jenny Hawthorne which led her to become an instant success. She made her last film in 1940.

== Filmography ==
- A Warm Corner (1930)
- Hindle Wakes (1931)
- Hobson's Choice (1931)
- The Frightened Lady (1932)
- Friday the Thirteenth (1933)
- The Girl in the Flat (1934)
- Youthful Folly (1934)
- Key to Harmony (1935)
- The Scotland Yard Mystery (1934)
- The Edge of the World (1937)
- Anything to Declare? (1938)
- Follow Your Star (1938)
- Yellow Sands (1938)
- Poison Pen (1939)
- The House of the Arrow (1940)
