= Giallo (1933 film) =

1933 film

- Directed by: Mario Camerini
- Written by: Mario Soldati
- Based on: The Man Who Changed His Name by Edgar Wallace
- Produced by: Baldassarre Negroni
- Starring: Assia Noris; Sandro Ruffini; Elio Steiner
- Cinematography: Massimo Terzano
- Edited by: Mario Camerini
- Music by: Guido Albanese
- Production company: Società Italiana Cines
- Distributed by: Societa Anonima Stefano Pittaluga
- Release date: 1933
- Running time: 69 minutes
- Country: Italy
- Language: Italian

Giallo is a 1933 Italian comedy thriller film directed by Mario Camerini and starring Assia Noris, Sandro Ruffini and Elio Steiner. It is based on the 1928 play The Man Who Changed His Name by Edgar Wallace in which a young wife begins to fear that her husband may in fact be an escaped murderer.

It was made to capitalise on the growing popularity in Italy of Giallo, mystery and thriller fiction notable for their yellow covers and melodramatic plots often written by Anglo-American writers. It is also considered an early precursor of the successful Italian Giallo film genre, which boomed after the Second World War.

The film's sets were designed by the art director Gastone Medin. It was shot at the Cines Studios in Rome.

== Cast ==
- Assia Noris as Henriette
- Sandro Ruffini as Giorgio - suo marito
- Elio Steiner as Il conte Amati
- Giulio Gemmò as Carlo - l'avvocato
- Carlo Ranieri as Il vecchio professore
- Aronne Limardi as Il guardacaccia
- Carlo Lombardi as Alessio - attore
- Vanda Barbini as L'attrice
- Luigi Erminio D'Olivo as Invitato alla festa

== Bibliography ==
- Moliterno, Gino (2009). The A to Z of Italian Cinema. Lanham, Maryland: Scarecrow Press. ISBN 978-0810870598.
