= Young Woodley (1930 film) =

1930 film directed by Thomas Bentley

- Directed by: Thomas Bentley
- Written by: Victor Kendall
- Based on: Young Woodley by John Van Druten
- Starring: Madeleine Carroll; Frank Lawton; Sam Livesey; Gerald Rawlinson
- Cinematography: Claude Friese-Greene
- Edited by: Sam Simmonds; Emile de Ruelle
- Production company: British International Pictures
- Distributed by: Wardour Films
- Release date: 2 July 1930
- Running time: 79 minutes
- Country: United Kingdom
- Language: English

Young Woodley is a 1930 British drama film directed by Thomas Bentley and starring Madeleine Carroll, Frank Lawton, Sam Livesey, and Gerald Rawlinson.

== Production ==
The film was based on the controversial 1925 play Young Woodley by John Van Druten. Bentley had previously directed a 1928 silent version, but the film was never released, and he re-made it in sound using some of the same actors. A school prefect becomes attracted to the headmaster's wife. The film, like the play, was noted for its subversive attitude to authority. The pompous and cold headmaster is portrayed as the villain of the work. The film was not a major success when it was released despite its large budget and well-known subject matter.

== Cast ==
- Madeleine Carroll as Laura Simmons
- Frank Lawton as Woodley
- Sam Livesey as Mr. Simmons
- Gerald Rawlinson as Milner
- Billy Milton as Vining
- Aubrey Mather as Mr. Woodley
- John Teed as Ainger
- Anthony Halfpenny as Cope
- René Ray as Kitty
- Fanny Wright as Mother

== Bibliography ==
- Richards, Jeffrey. The Age of the Dream Palace: Cinema and Society in Britain, 1930-1939. Routledge & Kegan Paul, 1984.
