= The Man Who Changed His Name (1928 film) =

1928 film

- Directed by: A. V. Bramble
- Written by: Edgar Wallace; Kathleen Hayden
- Starring: Stewart Rome; Betty Faire; James Raglan; Wallace Bosco
- Production company: British Lion Film Corporation
- Distributed by: British Lion Film Corporation
- Release date: 1928
- Country: United Kingdom
- Languages: Silent; English intertitles

The Man Who Changed His Name is a 1928 British silent mystery film directed by A. V. Bramble and starring Stewart Rome, Betty Faire and James Raglan. It is an adaptation of the play of the same title by Edgar Wallace. It was made at Beaconsfield Studios. The screenplay concerns a young woman who comes to suspect that her husband may in fact be a Canadian fugitive from justice, who murdered his last wife.

== Cast ==
- Stewart Rome as Selby Clive
- Betty Faire as Nita Clive
- James Raglan as Frank O'Ryan
- Ben Field as Sir Ralph Whitcombe
- Wallace Bosco as Jerry Muller
- Douglas Payne as A Canadian

== Bibliography ==
- Wood, Linda. British Films 1927-1939. British Film Institute, 1986.
