= H. K. Ayliff =

English theatre director

- Born: 1871; Grahamstown, Cape Colony
- Died: 1949 (aged 77–78); Cambridgeshire, England, United Kingdom
- Occupation: Theatre director

H. K. Ayliff was an English theatre director who directed Shakespeare in contemporary dress as early as the 1920s, as well as Yellow Sands on Broadway.

H.K. Ayliff was one of a triumvirate of celebrated British theatre directors during the years between the two world wars, the others being Tyrone Guthrie and Basil Dean.

Henry Kiell Ayliff was born 1871 in Grahamstown, Cape Colony, grandson of English settlers of 1820. He moved to England as a young man to study painting at the Royal Academy Schools and in Paris. In 1901 he gave up painting and studied acting under Herman Vezin, playing several parts in London and the provinces, including Juggins in Bernard Shaw’s Fanny's First Play at the Royal Court Theatre in Sloane Square. He frequently joined with other out-or-work actors in putting on one-off show-case productions, often directing these, and so developing a talent as a director.

He married Gertrude Homewood, an actress, in 1907. They had three children, Susan born in 1908, Esther in 1910 and David in 1916. In 1922 he started working as director at Barry Jackson’s Birmingham Repertory Theatre.

In April 1923 Cymbeline, the first of a series of modern-dress Shakespeare productions, caused quite a furore. Other important productions were the first production of Shaw’s five-part epic Back to Methuselah, Pirandello's Six Characters in Search of an Author for which he also wrote the English version, and the very popular The Farmer's Wife by Eden Phillpotts.

Many productions transferred to London during this period, and HK also found himself being employed by London managements such as C.B.Cochran for several productions. In 1929 Barry Jackson instituted a Summer Festival of plays at Malvern. Initially this was dedicated to the plays of George Bernard Shaw, but from 1931 the theme became ‘Five Centuries of English Drama’, starting with pre-Shakespeare, through Restoration, Georgian, Victorian, and ending with a new modern play. Most of these were directed by HK, when he was not otherwise engaged in the West End.

The outbreak of war in 1939 saw the end of the Malvern Festivals though the Malvern Theatre management tried unsuccessfully to revive it when peace was restored. Mr. and Mrs. Ayliff retired to their country cottage in Cambridgeshire at the outbreak of war, but in 1943 he returned to Birmingham to direct Shaw’s Heartbreak House and play the part of Capt. Shotover, Barrie’s Quality Street and another modern-dress production of The Taming of the Shrew with the young Margaret Leighton as Katherine.

In 1947 he directed a revival of James Bridie’s A Sleeping Clergyman at London’s Criterion Theatre, which he had first directed at the 1933 Malvern Festival and a revival of The Farmers Wife at The Apollo Theatre. He died in Cambridgeshire in 1949.
