= Eileen Beldon =

English actress (1901–1985)

Eileen Beldon (12 September 1901 – 3 August 1985) was an English stage and film actress. She had a successful career as a Shakespearean actress as well as in modern repertory theatre.

== Biography ==
Eileen Beldon was born on 12 September 1901 in Bradford, West Yorkshire to parents Albert Beldon and Bertha Nicholson. She attended Bradford Grammar School and the Hendon School. Beldon died on 3 August 1985.

== Career ==
Eileen Beldon made her first stage appearance at the Drury Lane Theatre on 26 December 1917 as a chorus member in a production of Aladdin. For several years thereafter she performed at the Old Vic in such roles as Maria in Twelfth Night, Audrey in As You Like It and Mopsa in The Winter's Tale. In 1920, she went on two tours throughout England. The first was in the role of Jocelyn in Sacred and Profane Love and the second was in the role of Kitty Cranford in The Great Day.

In March 1923, she joined the company at the Birmingham Repertory Theatre with which she performed through March 1924. She again appeared with the Birmingham company for their 1944–1945 season, appearing as Paulina in The Winter's Tale and Juno in Juno and the Paycock among other roles. Beldon also appeared with the Birmingham company from 1961 through 1964.

Beldon performed in a number of original Broadway theatre productions, including Yellow Sands at the Fulton Theatre and Fallen Angels at the 49th Street Theatre, both in 1927. Other major venues at which Beldon performed include the Garrick Theatre, the Winter Garden Theatre, the Guild Theatre, and at the Edinburgh Festival. She also appeared in various films and television programs, beginning with a role as a parlormaid in the 1938 film adaptation of Pygmalion.
