= The Man Who Changed His Name (1934 film) =

- U.S. lobby card
- Directed by: Henry Edwards
- Written by: Harry Fowler Mear
- Based on: The Man Who Changed His Name by Edgar Wallace
- Produced by: Julius Hagen
- Starring: Lyn Harding; Betty Stockfeld; Leslie Perrins
- Cinematography: Sydney Blythe
- Edited by: Michael C. Chorlton
- Music by: W.L. Trytel
- Production company: Real Art Productions
- Distributed by: Universal Pictures
- Release date: March 1934
- Running time: 80 minutes
- Country: United Kingdom
- Language: English

The Man Who Changed His Name is a 1934 British crime film directed by Henry Edwards and starring Lyn Harding, Betty Stockfeld and Leslie Perrins. It was written by Harry Fowler Mear based on the 1928 play The Man Who Changed His Name by Edgar Wallace, and was made as a quota quickie at Twickenham Studios. The film's art direction was by James A. Carter.

== Synopsis ==
A man appears to be being tricked, by his wife's lover, out of a valuable piece of land in Canada which contains lucrative silver deposits. Both the potential villains begin to have second thoughts when they gradually come to suspect that their intended victim, having since changed his name, is in fact a notorious killer from Canada. Eventually it transpires he was not the murderer, but is only using it as a trick to push his wife and her lover to reveal their deception out of fear.

== Cast ==
- Lyn Harding as Selby Clive
- Betty Stockfeld as Nita Clive
- Leslie Perrins as Frank Ryan
- Ben Welden as Jerry Muller
- Aubrey Mather as Sir Ralph Whitcombe
- Stanley Vine as Lane
- Richard Dolman as John Boscombe

== Reception ==
Kine Weekly wrote: "Mystery thriller, a sound, straightforward adaptation of one of Edgar Wallace's most successtul stories. The shewd plot combines suspense and humour in entertaining proportions, and good characterisation and sound direction enables its secrets to be successfully preserved."

The Daily Film Renter wrote: "Starting slowly, film quickens up as main situation is developed with laughs and thrills climax providing neat surprise twist. Stagy direction atoned for by interesting subject-matter and good performances from Harding and Perrins."
