= Aubrey Mather =

English actor (1885–1958)

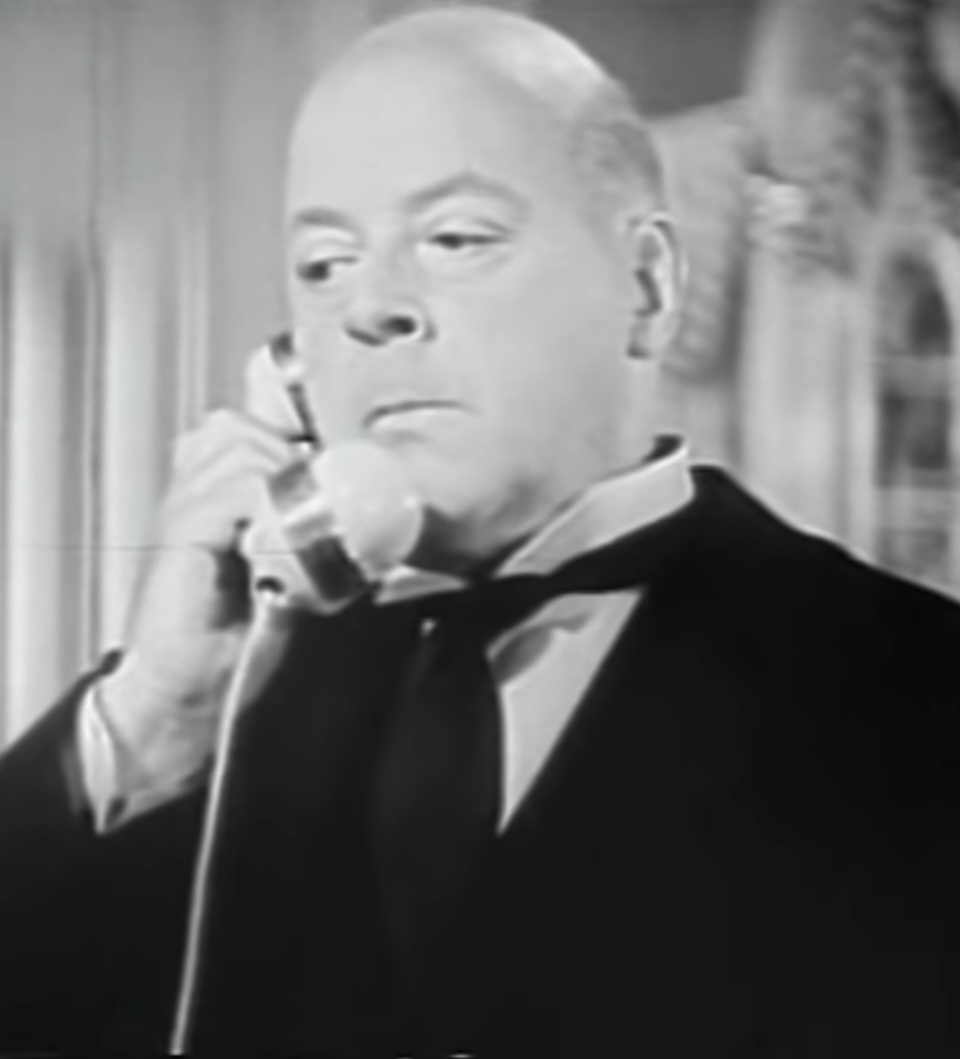
- Mather in No, No, Nanette (1940)
- Born: 17 December 1885; Minchinhampton, Gloucestershire, England
- Died: 16 January 1958 (aged 72); Harrow, London, England
- Occupation: Actor
- Years active: 1930–1954

Aubrey Mather (17 December 1885 – 16 January 1958) was an English character actor.

== Career ==
Mather was born in Minchinhampton, Gloucestershire, and began his career on the stage in 1905. He debuted in London in Brewster's Millions in 1909 and on Broadway ten years later in Luck of the Navy. He eventually branched out to films, starting with Young Woodley in 1930. He often played butlers. In the 1932 film The Impassive Footman, he played the eponymous footman. He died in Harrow, London, aged 72.

== Complete filmography ==
- Young Woodley (1930) – Mr. Woodley
- Aren't We All? (1932) – Vicar
- Love on the Spot (1932) – Mr. Prior
- The Impassive Footman (1932) – Dr. Bartlett
- Tell Me Tonight (1932) – Balthasar
- Red Wagon (1933) – Blewett
- The Man Changed His Name (1934) – Sir Ralph Whitcombe
- The Lash (1934) – Colonel Bush
- The Admiral's Secret (1934) – Captain Brooke
- Anything Might Happen (1934) – Seymour
- The Silent Passenger (1935) – Mervyn Bunter
- Ball at Savoy (1936) – Herbert
- When Knights Were Bold (1936) – The Canon
- As You Like It (1936) – Corin
- Chick (1936) – The Dean
- The Man in the Mirror (1936) – The Bogus of Bokhara
- Sabotage (1936) – W. Brown & Sons Greengrocer (uncredited)
- Underneath the Arches (1937) – Professor
- Life Begins with Love (1937) – Roberts
- London Wall (1938, TV Movie) – Mr. Walker
- Little Ladyship (1939, TV Movie) – Mr. Jessup
- The Shoemaker's Last (1939, TV Movie) – Herr Kaufmann
- Jamaica Inn (1939) – Coachman (uncredited)
- Magic (1939, TV Movie) – Doctor Grimthorpe
- Sheppey (1939, TV Movie) – Sheppey
- Just William (1940) – Fletcher
- Captain Caution (1940) – Mr. Potter
- Earl of Puddlestone (1940) – Lord Stoke-Newington
- Spring Parade (1940) – Baron (uncredited)
- Arise, My Love (1940) – Achille
- No, No, Nanette (1940) – Remington, the butler
- Road Show (1941) – Minister (uncredited)
- Rage in Heaven (1941) – Clark
- Men of Boys Town (1941) – Parsons, Maitland's Butler (uncredited)
- Dr. Jekyll and Mr. Hyde (1941) – Inspector (uncredited)
- Suspicion (1941) – Executor of General Laidlaw's Will (uncredited)
- Ball of Fire (1941) – Prof. Peagram
- The Wife Takes a Flyer (1942) – Chief Justice
- This Above All (1942) – Second Headwaiter (uncredited)
- Mrs. Miniver (1942) – George (uncredited)
- The Affairs of Martha (1942) – Justin I. Peacock
- Careful, Soft Shoulders (1942) – Mr. Fortune
- A Yank at Eton (1942) – Widgeon – Carlton's Butler (uncredited)
- The Undying Monster (1942) – Inspector Craig
- Random Harvest (1942) – Sheldon
- The Great Impersonation (1942) – Sir Ronald Clayfair
- Forever and a Day (1943) – Man in Air Raid Shelter
- Hello, Frisco, Hello (1943) – Douglas Dawson
- Heaven Can Wait (1943) – James
- The Song of Bernadette (1943) – Mayor Lacade
- Jane Eyre (1943) – Colonel Dent
- The Lodger (1944) – Superintendent Sutherland
- Wilson (1944) – Hughes' Butler (uncredited)
- National Velvet (1944) – Entry Official
- The Keys of the Kingdom (1944) – (scenes cut)
- The House of Fear (1945) – Alastair
- Temptation (1946) – Dr. Harding
- The Mighty McGurk (1947) – Milbane
- It Happened in Brooklyn (1947) – Digby John
- For the Love of Rusty (1947) – Dr. Francis Xavier Fay
- The Hucksters (1947) – Mr. Glass, Valet
- Julia Misbehaves (1948) – The Vicar
- Joan of Arc (1948) – Jean de la Fontaine
- Adventures of Don Juan (1948) – Lord Chalmers
- The Secret Garden (1949) – Dr. Griddlestone
- The Secret of St. Ives (1949) – Daniel Romaine
- Everybody Does It (1949) – Mr. Hertz (uncredited)
- That Forsyte Woman (1949) – James Forsyte
- The Importance of Being Earnest (1952) – Merriman
- South of Algiers (1953) – Professor Young
- Fast and Loose (1954) – Noony
- To Dorothy a Son (1954) – Dr. Cameron
