= Young Woodley (1928 film) =

1928 film directed by Thomas Bentley

- Directed by: Thomas Bentley
- Written by: John Van Druten (play); Eliot Stannard
- Produced by: Thomas Bentley; E.A. Abrahams
- Starring: Marjorie Hume; Sam Livesey; Robin Irvine; Carl Harbord
- Cinematography: William Shenton; Hugh Marr
- Production company: Regal Pictures
- Distributed by: Regal Pictures
- Release date: 1928
- Running time: 8,162 feet
- Country: United Kingdom
- Languages: Silent; English intertitles

Young Woodley is a 1928 British silent drama film directed by Thomas Bentley and starring Marjorie Hume, Sam Livesey and Robin Irvine. The film was never released, and was subsequently remade by Bentley as a sound film Young Woodley in 1930. It was made at Cricklewood Studios. It was based on the play Young Woodley by John Van Druten. This silent version was released to the home movie market running 8 x 200 ft reels, standard 8mm on Amber Stock.

== Premise ==
The wife of a school headmaster becomes romantically involved with one of his pupils.

== Cast ==
- Marjorie Hume as Laura Simmons
- Sam Livesey as Doctor Simmons
- Robin Irvine as Woodley
- Carl Harbord as Ainger
- Gerald Rawlinson as Vining
- John Cromer as Mr Woodley
- Tom Helmore as Milner
- Dorothy Black as Francesca

== Bibliography ==
- Wood, Linda. British Films, 1927-1939. British Film Institute, 1986.
