= James Raglan =

British actor (1901–1961)

- 1939 Spotlight photo
- Born: 6 January 1901; Redhill, Surrey, England
- Died: 15 November 1961 (aged 60); London, England
- Occupation: Actor
- Years active: 1928–1961

James Raglan (6 January 1901 – 15 November 1961) was a British stage, film and television actor.

== In Australia ==
Early in 1935 he was brought out to Australia with the Gabriel Toyne company by J. C. Williamson, playing Laburnum Grove and Michael Egan's The Dominant Sex. During this time he had appeared in the radio serials The Scarlet Pimpernel and Khyber by Edmund Barclay, in both series opposite Hilda Scurr.

His stage contract over, he stayed behind, as leading man with Sydney radio station 2GB's B.S.A. Players, starring in its first comedy success Dolly and Dan. After a brief appearance in the 1936 film The Flying Doctor, he joined the ABC where he played in Edmund Barclay's As Ye Sow, Noël Coward's Cavalcade, Max Afford's Fly by Night and Edmund Barclay's Into the Light. He made two more films: Lovers and Luggers and Mr Chedworth Steps Out. He founded a production company "Raglan Radio Recordings", making a number of adventure serials. But despite having some excellent actors (including Peter Finch and Nigel Lovell) under contract, his venture failed and he returned to England in 1939. According to Fimink Raglan "always looked ill on screen".

== Selected filmography ==
- The Forger (1928) - Peter Clifton
- The Man Who Changed His Name (1928) - Frank O'Ryan
- The Last Hour (1930) - Charles Lister
- Red Aces (1930) - Rufus Machfield
- The Rasp (1931) - Alan Deacon
- The Chinese Puzzle (1932) - Sir Charles
- The World, the Flesh, and the Devil (1932) - Robert Hall
- The Shadow (1933) - Beverley Kent
- The Admiral's Secret (1934) - Frank Bruce
- Jew Süss (1934) - Lord Suffolk
- Rolling Home (1935) - Captain Pengelly
- The Morals of Marcus (1935)
- The Flying Doctor (1936) - Dr. John Vaughan
- Lovers and Luggers (1938) - Bill Craig, alias Craig Henderson
- Mr. Chedworth Steps Out (1939) - Brian Carford
- Dick Barton Strikes Back (1949) - Lord Armadale
- Doctor Morelle (1949)
- Celia (1949) - Inspector Parker
- Whispering Smith Hits London (1951) - Supt. Meaker
- The Floating Dutchman (1952) - Mr. Wynn
- The Broken Horseshoe (1953) - Supt. Grayson
- Operation Diplomat (1953) - Sir Oliver Peters
- The Black Rider (1954) - Rackton
- Fabian of the Yard (1954)
- No Smoking (1955) - Chancellor
- The Birthday Present (1957) - Prison Governor (uncredited)
- Chain of Events (1958) - Magistrate
- Dangerous Afternoon (1961) - Sir Phillip Morstan (Last appearance)

== Television appearances ==
- The Three Musketeers (1954) - D'Artagnan the Elder
- Mary Britten, M.D. (1958) - Walter Davis
- No Hiding Place (1960) - Commander Hutchins
