= Yellow Sands (play) =

1926 play

- Original language: English
- Written by: Eden Phillpotts; Adelaide Phillpotts

Premiere
- Date: 1926
- Place: Haymarket Theatre

Yellow Sands is a play which opened at the Haymarket Theatre, London on 3 November 1926, where it ran for 610 performances, and at the Fulton Theatre, New York City on 10 September 1927, where it ran for 25 performances, closing in October 1927.

Yellow Sands was written by Eden Phillpotts and his daughter Adelaide Phillpotts, produced by Sir Barry Jackson and directed by H. K. Ayliff.

The production marked the London debut of Sir Ralph Richardson.

It was adapted for a film, Yellow Sands, in 1938.

== Plot ==
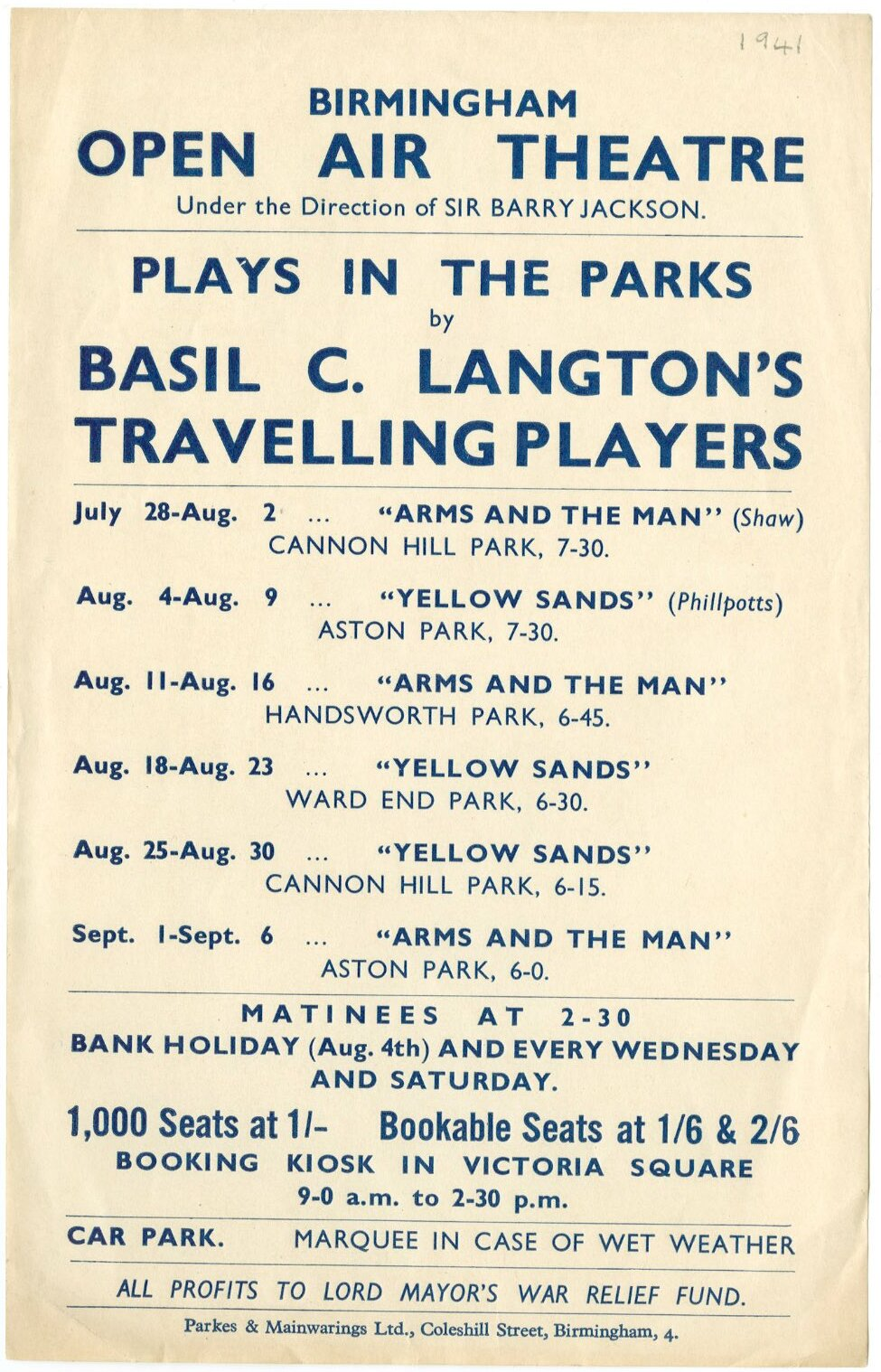
Flyer for Birmingham Open Air Theatre, 1941, with plays including Yellow Sands performed in municipal parks during World War II.

A wealthy dying woman's relatives gather, unaware that they have all been cut out of her will.

== Opening night cast (New York) ==
- Reginald Bach
- Florence Barnes
- Eileen Beldon
- Madge Burbage
- Arthur Claremont
- Wilson Colman
- Jack Livesey
- Lester Matthews
- Joyce Moore
- Nellie Sheffield
- Winnie Tempest
