= Eden Phillpotts =

English author, poet and dramatist (1862–1960)

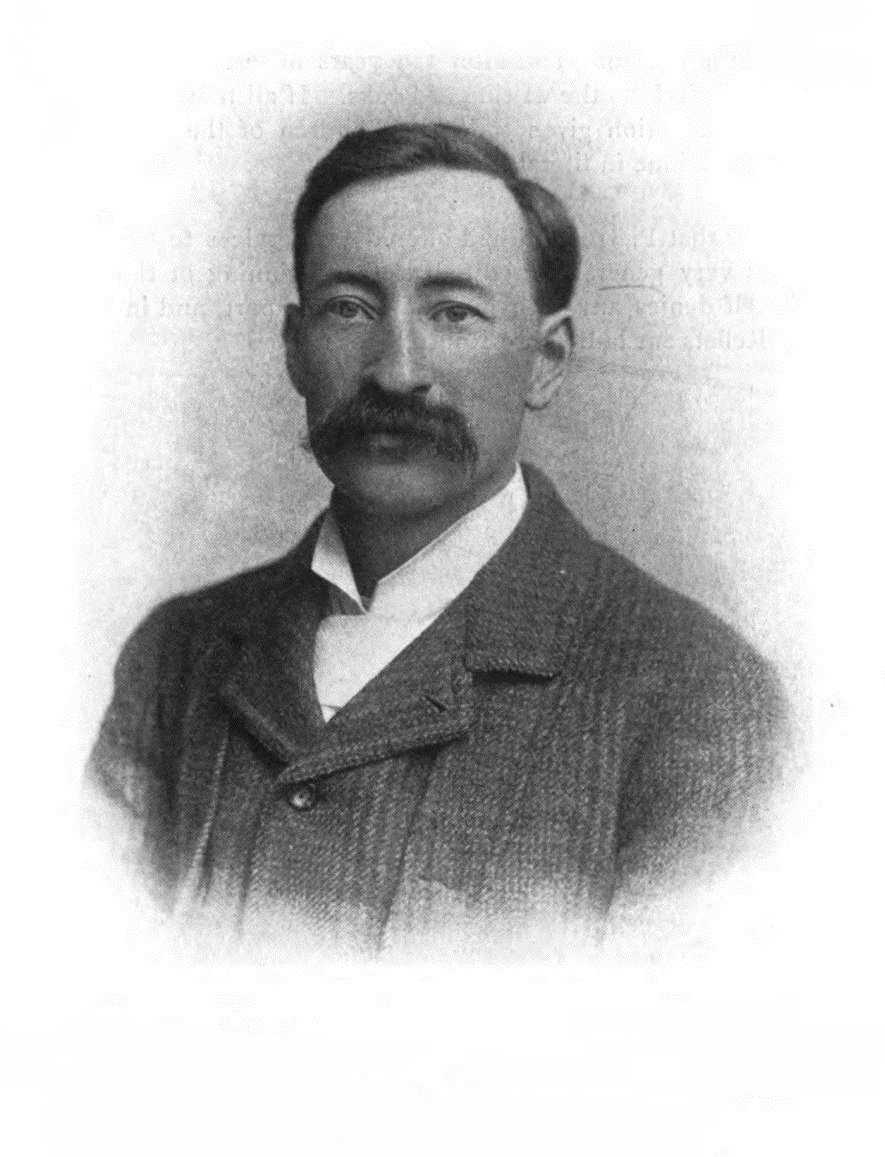
- Born: 4 November 1862; Mount Abu, Rajasthan, India
- Died: 29 December 1960 (aged 98); Broad Clyst, Devon
- Children: Adelaide Phillpotts
- Relatives: Henry Phillpotts (great-uncle); James Surtees Phillpotts (second cousin)

Eden Phillpotts (4 November 1862 – 29 December 1960) was an English author, poet and dramatist. He was born in Mount Abu, India, was educated in Plymouth, Devon, and worked as an insurance officer for ten years before studying for the stage and eventually becoming a writer.

== Life ==
Eden Phillpotts was a great-nephew of Henry Phillpotts, Bishop of Exeter. His father Henry Phillpotts was a son of the bishop's younger brother Thomas Phillpotts. James Surtees Phillpotts the reforming headmaster of Bedford School was his second cousin.

Eden Phillpotts was born on 4 November 1862 at Mount Abu in Rajasthan. His father Henry was an officer in the Indian Army, while his mother Adelaide was the daughter of an Indian Civil Service officer posted in Madras, George Jenkins Waters.

Henry Phillpotts died in 1865, leaving Adelaide a widow at the age of 21. With her three small sons, of whom Eden was the eldest, she returned to England and settled in Plymouth.

Phillpotts was educated at Mannamead School in Plymouth. At school he showed no signs of a literary bent. In 1879, aged 17, he left home and went to London to earn his living. He found a job as a clerk with the Sun Fire Office.

Phillpotts' ambition was to be an actor and he attended evening classes at a drama school for two years. He came to the conclusion that he would never make a name as an actor but might have success as a writer. In his spare time out of office hours he proceeded to create a stream of small works which he was able to sell. In due course he left the insurance company to concentrate on his writing, while also working part-time as assistant editor for the weekly Black and White magazine.

Eden Phillpotts maintained a steady output of three or four books a year for the next half century. He produced poetry, short stories, novels, plays and mystery tales. Many of his novels were about rural Devon life and some of his plays were distinguished by their effective use of regional dialect.

Eden Phillpotts died at his home in Broadclyst near Exeter, Devon, on 29 December 1960.

== Personal life ==
Phillpotts was for many years the President of the Dartmoor Preservation Association and cared passionately about the conservation of Dartmoor. He was an agnostic and a supporter of the Rationalist Press Association.

Phillpotts was a friend of Agatha Christie, who was an admirer of his work and a regular visitor to his home. She dedicated her 1932 novel Peril at End House to Phillpotts, and in her autobiography, she expressed gratitude for his early advice on fiction writing and quoted some of it. Jorge Luis Borges was another Phillpotts admirer. Borges mentioned him numerous times, wrote at least two reviews of his novels, and included him in his "Personal Library", a collection of works selected to reflect his personal literary preferences.

Philpotts allegedly sexually abused his daughter Adelaide. In a 1976 interview for a book about her father, Adelaide described an incestuous "relationship" with him that she says lasted from the age of five or six until her early thirties, when he remarried. When she herself finally married at the age of 55 her father never forgave her, and never communicated with her again.

== Writings ==
Phillpotts wrote a great many books with a Dartmoor setting. One of his novels, Widecombe Fair (1913), inspired by an annual fair at the village of Widecombe-in-the-Moor, provided the scenario for his comic play The Farmer's Wife (1916). It went on to become a 1928 silent film of the same name, directed by Alfred Hitchcock. It was followed by a 1941 remake, directed by Norman Lee and Leslie Arliss. It became a BBC TV drama in 1955, directed by Owen Reed. Jan Stewer played Churdles Ash. The BBC had broadcast the play in 1934.

He co-wrote several plays with his daughter Adelaide Phillpotts, The Farmer's Wife and Yellow Sands (1926); she later claimed their relationship was incestuous. Eden is best known as the author of many novels, plays and poems about Dartmoor. His Dartmoor cycle of 18 novels and two volumes of short stories still has many avid readers despite the fact that many titles are out of print.

Philpotts also wrote a series of novels, each set against the background of a different trade or industry. Titles include: Brunel's Tower (a pottery) and Storm in a Teacup (hand-papermaking). Among his other works is The Grey Room, the plot of which is centred on a haunted room in an English manor house. He also wrote a number of other mystery novels, both under his own name and the pseudonym Harrington Hext. These include: The Thing at Their Heels, The Red Redmaynes, The Monster, The Clue from the Stars, and The Captain's Curio. The Human Boy was a collection of schoolboy stories in the same genre as Rudyard Kipling's Stalky & Co., though different in mood and style. Late in his long writing career he wrote a few books of interest to science fiction and fantasy readers, the most noteworthy being Saurus, which involves an alien reptilian observing human life.

Eric Partridge praised the immediacy and impact of his dialect writing.

== Photographs ==
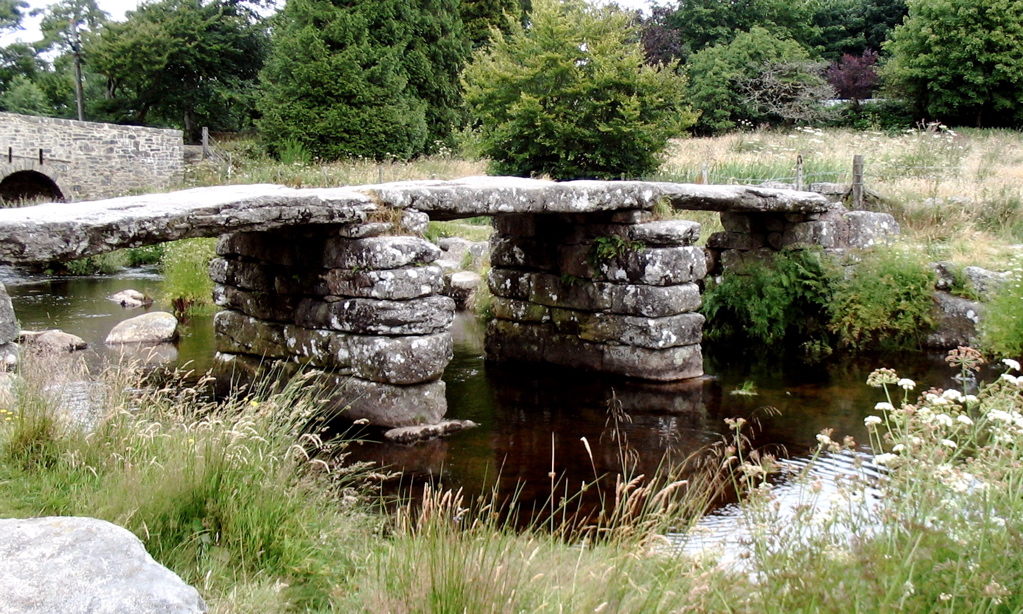
The clapper bridge at Postbridge, which is the central location of Phillpotts' novel The Thief of Virtue.

== Works ==
Novels

- The End of a Life (1891)
- Folly and Fresh Air (1891)
- A Tiger's Club (1892)
- A Deal with the Devil (1895)
- Some Every-day Folks (1895)
- My Laughing Philosopher (1896)
- Down Dartmoor Way (1896)
- Lying Prophets: A Novel (1897)
- Children of the Mist (1898)
- Sons of the Morning (1900)
- The Good Red Earth (1901)
- The River (1902)
- Old Delabole (1903)
- The Golden Fetich (1903)
- The American Prisoner (1904)
- The Farm of the Dagger (1904)
- The Secret Woman (1905)
- The Poacher's Wife (1906) AKA Daniel Sweetland (1906)
- The Sinews of War: A Romance of London and the Sea (1906) with Arnold Bennett
- Doubloons (1906) with Arnold Bennett
- The Portreeve (1906)
- The Whirlwind (1907)
- The Human Boy Again (1908)
- The Mother (1908)
- The Virgin in Judgment (1908) AKA A Fight to Finish (1911)
- The Statue: A Story of International Intrigue and Mystery (1908) with Arnold Bennett
- The Three Brothers (1909)
- The Fun of the Fair (1909)
- The Haven (1909)
- The Flint Heart: A Fairy Story (1910)
- The Thief of Virtue (1910)
- The Beacon (1911)
- Demeter's Daughter (1911)
- The Three Knaves (1912)
- The Forest on the Hill (1912)
- The Lovers: A Romance (1912)
- Widecombe Fair (1913)
- The Joy of Youth (1913)
- The Old Time Before Them (1913)
- Faith Tresilion (1914)
- The Master of Merripit (1914)
- Brunel's Tower (1915)
- The Green Alleys: A Comedy (1916)
- The Human Boy and the War (1916)
- The Girl and the Faun (1916)
- The Banks of Colne: (the Nursery) (1917)
- The Spinners (1918)
- From the Angle of Seventeen (1912)
- Evander (1919)
- Storm in a Teacup (1919)
- Miser's Money (1920)
- Eudocia (1921)
- The Grey Room (1921)
- The Bronze Venus (1921)
- Orphan Dinah (1920)
- The Red Redmaynes (1922)
- Pan and the Twins (1922)
- Number 87 (1922)
- The Thing at Their Heels (1923)
- Children of Men (1923)
- Cheat-the-boys; a Story of the Devonshire Orchards (1924)
- Redcliff (1924)
- The Treasures of Typhon (1924)
- The Lavender Dragon (1924)
- Who Killed Diana? (1924)
- Circé's Island (1924)
- A Voice from the Dark (1925)
- The Monster (1925)
- George Westover (1926)
- The Marylebone Miser (1926) AKA Jig-Saw (1926)
- Cornish Droll: A Novel (1926)
- The Miniature (1926)
- The Jury (1927)
- Arachne (1928)
- The Ring Fence (1928)
- Tryphena (1929)
- The Apes (1929)
- The Three Maidens (1930)
- Alcyone (a Fairy Story) (1930)
- "Found Drowned" (1931)
- A Clue from the Stars (1932)
- The Broom Squires (1932)
- Stormbury, A Story of Devon (1932)
- The Captain's Curio (1933)
- Bred in the Bone (1933)
- Witch's Cauldron (1933)
- Nancy Owlett (1933)
- Minions of the Moon (1934)
- Ned of the Caribbees (1934)
- Portrait of a Gentleman (1934)
- Mr. Digweed and Mr. Lumb: A Mystery Novel (1934)
- The Oldest Inhabitant: A Comedy (1934)
- A Close Call (1936)
- The Owl of Athene (1936)
- The White Camel: A Story of Arabia (1936)
- The Anniversary Murder (1936)
- The Wife of Elias: A Mystery Novel (1937)
- Wood-nymph (1937)
- Farce in Three Acts (1937)
- Portrait of a Scoundrel (1938)
- Saurus (1938)
- Lycanthrope, the Mystery of Sir William Wolf (1938)
- Dark Horses (1938)
- Golden Island (1938)
- Thorn in Her Flesh (1939)
- Tabletop (1939) with Arnold Bennett
- Monkshood (1939)
- Chorus of Clowns (1940)
- Goldcross (1940)
- Awake Deborah! (1941)
- Ghostwater (1941)
- The Deed Without a Name (1942)
- Pilgrims of the Night (1942)
- A Museum Piece (1943)
- Flower of the Gods (1943)
- The Changeling (1944)
- The Drums of Dombali (1945)
- They Were Seven: (A Mystery) (1945)
- Quartet (1946)
- The Fall of the House of Heron (1948)
- Address Unknown (1949)
- The Waters of Walla (1950)
- Through a Glass Darkly (1951)
- George and Georgina: A Mystery Story (1952)
- His Brother's Keeper (1953)
- The Widow Garland (1955)
- Connie Woodland (1956)
- Giglet Market (1957)
- There Was an Old Man (1959)

Short Fiction Books

- My Adventure in the Flying Scotsman; a Romance of London and North-Western Railway Shares (1888)
- The Human Boy (1899)
- Loup-garou! (1899)
- Summer Clouds and Other Stories (1893)
- Fancy Free (1901)
- The Striking Hours (1901)
- The Transit of the Red Dragon: And Other Tales (1903)
- Knock at a Venture (1905)
- The Unlucky Number (1906)
- The Folk Afield (1907)
- Tales of the Tenements (1910)
- The Judge's Chair (1914)
- The Human Boy and the War (1916)
- Chronicles of St. Tid (1918)
- Black, White, and Brindled (1923)
- Up Hill, Down Dale: A Volume of Short Stories (1925)
- Peacock House and Other Mysteries (1926)
- It happened Like That, a New Volume of Short Stories (1928)
- The Torch and Other Tales (1929)
- Cherry Gambol and Other Stories (1930)
- They Could Do No Other: A Volume of Stories (1932)
- Once upon a Time (1936)
- The Hidden Hand (1952)

Poetry

- Up-Along and Down-Along (1905)
- Wild Fruit (1911)
- The Iscariot (1912)
- Delight and Other Poems (1916)
- Plain Song (1917)
- A Shadow Passes [Observations and Poems] (1918)
- As the Wind Blows (1920)
- A Dish of Apples (1921)
- Pixies' Plot (1922)
- Thoughts in Prose and Verse (1924)
- Cherry-Stones (1924)
- A Harvesting (1924)
- Brother Beast (1928)
- Brother Man (1928)
- Goodwill (1928)
- For Remembrance (1929)
- A Hundred Sonnets (1929)
- A Hundred Lyrics (1930)
- Becoming (1932)
- Song of a Sailor Man: A Narrative Poem (1933)
- Sonnets from Nature (1935)
- A Dartmoor Village (1937)
- Miniatures (1942)
- The Enchanted Wood (1948)
- One Thing and Another [Essays and poems.] (1954)

Plays

- The Prude's Progress: A Comedy with Jerome K. Jerome (1895)
- A Golden Wedding: An Original Comedy in One Act (1899)
- A Breezy Morning (1904)
- A Pair of Knickerbockers (1900)
- Curtain Raisers (1912)
- The Shadow; A Play in Three Acts (1913)
- The Mother: A Play in Four Acts (1914)
- The Secret Woman; A Play in Five Acts (1914)
- The Angel in the House: A Comedy in Three Acts (1915)
- The Farmer's Wife (1916)
- Arachne; A Play (1920) By Adelaide Eden Phillpotts
- St. George and the Dragons: A Comedy in Three Acts (1919) AKA *The bishop's night out (1929)
- The Market-Money. A Play in One Act (1923)
- Bed Rock: A Comedy in Three Acts (1924)
- Devonshire Cream: A Comedy in Three Acts (1925)
- A Comedy Royal (1925) Dramatization of Eudocia (1921)
- Yellow Sands (1926)
- Blue Comet (1927)
- The Runaways: A Comedy in Three Acts (1928)
- Three Short Plays: The Market-money; Something to Talk about; The Purple Bedroom (1928)
- Buy a Broom: A Comedy in Three Acts (1929)
- Jane's Legacy: A Folk Play in Three Acts (1931)
- The Good Old Days: A Comedy in Three Acts (1932) with his daughter
- Bert: A Play in One Act (1932)
- A Cup of Happiness: A Comedy (1933)
- At the 'bus-stop: A Duologue for Two Women (1943)
- The Orange Orchard (1951) Based on The Waters of Walla

Nonfiction

- In Sugar-Cane Land (1890)
- My Garden (1906)
- Dance of the Months. [Sketches of Dartmoor and poems.] (1911)
- My Shrubs (1915)
- My Devon Year (1916)
- One Hundred Pictures from Eden Phillpotts / Selected by L.H. Brewitt (1919)
- A West Country Pilgrimage (1920) [Essays and verse.]
- A West Country Sketch Book (1928) Essays from Dance of the Months and A West Country Pilgrimage with one new essay.
- Essays in Little (1931)
- Handmade Paper: Its Method of Manufacture as Described in the Novel "Storm in a Teacup" (1932)
- A Year with Bisshe-Bantam (1934)
- A Mixed Grill (1940) Essays.
- From the Angle of 88 (1951)
- Selected Letters (1984)

=== Omnibus ===
- Dartmoor Omnibus [Orphan Dinah, Three Brothers, Children of Men, The Whirlwind]
- Three plays: The shadows; The mother; The secret woman (1913)
- Circe's Island and The Girl & The Faun (1925)
- The Complete Human Boy. Comprising "The Human Boy," "The Human Boy Again," "The Human Boy and the War," "The Human Boy's Diary," "From the Angle of Seventeen," Etc. (1930)
- West Country Plays (1933) [Buy a Broom and A Cup of Happiness.]
- The Book of Avis: A Trilogy Comprising Bred in the Bone, Witch's Cauldron, A Shadow Passes [1936]
