= Shaw Festival production history =

The Shaw Festival is a major Canadian theatre festival in Niagara-on-the-Lake, Ontario, the second largest repertory theatre company in North America. Founded in 1962, its original mandate was to stimulate interest in George Bernard Shaw and his period, and to advance the development of theatre arts in Canada.

The following is a chronological list of the productions that have been staged as part of the Shaw Festival since its inception.

== 1962 ==
- Don Juan in Hell – (from Man and Superman) by George Bernard Shaw
- Candida – by George Bernard Shaw

== 1963 ==
- You Never Can Tell – by George Bernard Shaw
- How He Lied to Her Husband – by George Bernard Shaw
- The Man of Destiny – by George Bernard Shaw
- Androcles and the Lion – by George Bernard Shaw

== 1964 ==
- Heartbreak House – by George Bernard Shaw
- Village Wooing – by George Bernard Shaw
- The Dark Lady of the Sonnets – by George Bernard Shaw
- John Bull's Other Island – by George Bernard Shaw

== 1965 ==
- Pygmalion – by George Bernard Shaw
- The Shadow of a Gunman – by Seán O'Casey
- The Millionairess – by George Bernard Shaw

== 1966 ==
- Man and Superman – by George Bernard Shaw
- Misalliance – by George Bernard Shaw
- The Apple Cart – by George Bernard Shaw

== 1967 ==
- Arms and the Man – by George Bernard Shaw
- The Circle – by W. Somerset Maugham
- Major Barbara – by George Bernard Shaw

== 1968 ==
- Heartbreak House – by George Bernard Shaw
- The Importance of Being Oscar – based on the life and works of Oscar Wilde, by Michael MacLiammoir
- The Chemmy Circle – by Georges Feydeau, translated by Suzanne Grossman and Paxton Whitehead.

== 1969 ==
- The Doctor's Dilemma – by George Bernard Shaw
- Back to Methuselah (Part One) – by George Bernard Shaw
- Five Variations for Corno di Basetto – from the music criticism of George Bernard Shaw
- The Guardsman – by Ferenc Molnár

== 1970 ==
- Candida – by George Bernard Shaw
- Forty Years On – by Alan Bennett

== 1971 ==
- The Philanderer – by George Bernard Shaw
- Summer Days – by Romain Weingarten, translated by Suzanne Grossman
- Tonight at 8.30 – by Noël Coward
- War Women and Other Trivia -- A Social Success – by Max Beerbohm
- O'Flaherty V.C. – by George Bernard Shaw
- Press Cuttings – by George Bernard Shaw

== 1972 ==
- The Royal Family – by George S. Kaufman and Edna Ferber
- Getting Married – by George Bernard Shaw
- Misalliance – by George Bernard Shaw

== 1973 ==
- You Never Can Tell – by George Bernard Shaw
- The Brass Butterfly – by William Golding
- Fanny's First Play – by George Bernard Shaw
- Sister of Mercy – A Musical Journey into the World of Leonard Cohen – conceived by Gene Lesser

== 1974 ==
- The Devil's Disciple – by George Bernard Shaw
- Too True to be Good – by George Bernard Shaw
- Charley's Aunt – by Brandon Thomas
- The Admirable Bashville – by George Bernard Shaw
- Rosmersholm – by Henrik Ibsen

== 1975 ==
- Pygmalion – by George Bernard Shaw
- Leaven of Malice – by Robertson Davies
- Caesar and Cleopatra – by George Bernard Shaw
- The First Night of Pygmalion – by Richard Huggett
- G.K.C. The Wit and Wisdom of Gilbert Keith Chesterton – compiled, arranged and performed by Tony Van Bridge

== 1976 ==
- Mrs. Warren's Profession – by George Bernard Shaw
- The Admirable Crichton – by J. M. Barrie
- Arms and the Man – by George Bernard Shaw
- The Apple Cart – by George Bernard Shaw

== 1977 ==
- Man and Superman – by George Bernard Shaw
- Thark – by Ben Travers
- The Millionairess – by George Bernard Shaw
- Great Catherine – by George Bernard Shaw
- Widowers' Houses – by George Bernard Shaw

== 1978 ==
- Major Barbara – by George Bernard Shaw
- John Gabriel Borkman – by Henrik Ibsen
- Heartbreak House – by George Bernard Shaw
- Lady Audley's Secret – A Musical Melodrama – by Mary Elizabeth Braddon, adapted by Douglas Seale, music by George Goehring, lyrics by John Kuntz

== 1979 ==
- You Never Can Tell – by George Bernard Shaw
- The Corn is Green – by Emlyn Williams
- Dear Liar – by Jerome Kilty
- Captain Brassbound's Conversion – by George Bernard Shaw
- Blithe Spirit – by Noël Coward
- My Astonishing Self from the writings of G.B.S., – by Michael Voysey
- Village Wooing – by George Bernard Shaw

== 1980 ==
- Misalliance – by George Bernard Shaw
- The Cherry Orchard – by Anton Chekhov
- A Flea in Her Ear – by Georges Feydeau
- The Grand Hunt – by Gyula Hernady
- The Philanderer – by George Bernard Shaw
- A Respectable Wedding – by Bertolt Brecht, translated by Jean Benedetti
- Canuck – by John Bruce Cowan
- Puttin on the Ritz – by Irving Berlin
- Gunga Heath – compiled and performed by Heath Lamberts
- Overruled – by George Bernard Shaw

== 1981 ==
- Saint Joan – by George Bernard Shaw
- Tons of Money – by Will Evans and Valentine
- The Suicide – by Nikolai Erdman
- Camille – by Robert David MacDonald
- In Good King Charles's Golden Days – by George Bernard Shaw
- The Magistrate – by Arthur Wing Pinero
- Rose-Marie – book and lyrics by Otto Harbach and Oscar Hammerstein, music by Rudolf Friml and Herbert Stothart
- The Man of Destiny – by George Bernard Shaw

== 1982 ==
- Pygmalion – by George Bernard Shaw
- See How They Run – by Philip King
- Camille – by Robert David MacDonald
- Cyrano de Bergerac – by Edmond Rostand
- Too True to Be Good – by George Bernard Shaw
- The Singular Life of Alfred Nobbs – adapted by Simone Benmussa from Albert Nobbs by George Moore
- The Desert Song – book and lyrics by Otto Harbach, Oscar Hammerstein and Frank Mandel
- The Music Cure – by George Bernard Shaw

== 1983 ==
- Caesar and Cleopatra – by George Bernard Shaw
- Cyrano de Bergerac – by Edmond Rostand
- Rookery Nook – by Ben Travers
- Private Lives – by Noël Coward
- The Simpleton of the Unexpected Isles – by George Bernard Shaw
- Candida – by George Bernard Shaw
- The Vortex – by Noël Coward
- Tom Jones – by Sir Edward German, libretto by Robert Courtneidge and A. M. Thompson
- O'Flaherty V.C. – by George Bernard Shaw

== 1984 ==
- The Devil's Disciple – by George Bernard Shaw
- Private Lives – by Noël Coward
- The Skin of Our Teeth – by Thornton Wilder
- Célimar (or Friends of a Feather) – by Eugène Labiche
- Androcles and the Lion – by George Bernard Shaw
- The Vortex – by Noël Coward
- The Lost Letter – by Ian Luca Caragiale
- Roberta – books and lyrics by Otto Harbach, music by Jerome Kern
- The Shaw Playlets: The Fascinating Foundling and How He Lied to Her Husband – by George Bernard Shaw
- 1984 – by George Orwell

== 1985 ==
- Heartbreak House – by George Bernard Shaw
- The Madwoman of Chaillot – by Jean Giraudoux
- One for the Pot – by Ray Cooney and Tony Hilton
- Cavalcade – by Noël Coward
- John Bull's Other Island – by George Bernard Shaw
- The Women – by Clare Boothe Luce
- Tropical Madness No. 2 – Metaphysics of the Two-Headed Calf – by Stanisław Witkiewicz
- Murder on the Nile – by Agatha Christie
- Naughty Marietta – book and lyrics by Rida Johnson Young, music by Victor Herbert
- The Inca of Perusalem – by George Bernard Shaw

== 1986 ==
- Arms and the Man – by George Bernard Shaw
- Banana Ridge – by Ben Travers
- Cavalcade – by Noël Coward
- Back to Methuselah – by George Bernard Shaw
- On the Rocks – by George Bernard Shaw
- Holiday – by Philip Barry
- Tonight We Improvise – by Luigi Pirandello
- Black Coffee – by Agatha Christie
- Girl Crazy – music by George Gershwin, lyrics by Ira Gershwin, libretto by John McGowan and Guy Bolton
- Passion, Poison and Petrifaction – by George Bernard Shaw

== 1987 ==
- Major Barbara – by George Bernard Shaw
- Hay Fever – by Noël Coward
- Marathon 33 – by June Havoc
- Peter Pan – by J.M. Barrie
- Fanny's First Play – by George Bernard Shaw
- Night of January 16th – by Ayn Rand
- Playing with Fire – by August Strindberg
- Salome – by Oscar Wilde
- Not in the Book – by Arthur Watkyn
- Anything Goes – music and lyrics by Cole Porter, book by Guy Bolton and P.G. Wodehouse
- Augustus Does His Bit – by George Bernard Shaw

== 1988 ==
- You Never Can Tell – by George Bernard Shaw
- Peter Pan – by J.M. Barrie
- War and Peace – by Leo Tolstoy
- Once in a Lifetime – by Moss Hart and George S. Kaufman
- Geneva – by George Bernard Shaw
- The Voysey Inheritance – by Harley Granville Barker
- He Who Gets Slapped – by Leonid Andreyev
- Dangerous Corner – by J.B. Priestley
- Hit the Deck – music by Vincent Youmans, lyrics by Leo Robin, Clifford Grey and Irving Caesar, book by Herbert Fields
- The Dark Lady of the Sonnets – by George Bernard Shaw

== 1989 ==
- Man and Superman – by George Bernard Shaw
- Berkeley Square – by John L. Balderston
- Once in a Lifetime – by Moss Hart and George S. Kaufman
- Trelawny of the "Wells" – by Arthur Wing Pinero
- Getting Married – by George Bernard Shaw
- Peer Gynt – by Henrik Ibsen, translated by John Lingard
- Nymph Errant – music and lyrics by Cole Porter, libretto by Romney Brent, from the novel by James Laver
- An Inspector Calls – by J.B. Priestley
- Good News – music by Ray Henderson, book by Laurence Schwab and B.G. DeSylva
- Shakes versus Shav and The Glimpse of Reality – by George Bernard Shaw

== 1990 ==
- Misalliance – by George Bernard Shaw
- Trelawny of the "Wells" – by Arthur Wing Pinero
- The Waltz of the Toreadors – by Jean Anouilh, translated by Lucienne Hill
- Present Laughter – by Noël Coward
- Mrs. Warren's Profession – by George Bernard Shaw
- Nymph Errant – music and lyrics by Cole Porter, libretto by Romney Brent, from the novel by James Laver
- Ubu Rex – by Alfred Jarry, translated by David Copelin
- Night Must Fall – by Emlyn Williams
- When We Are Married – by J.B. Priestley
- Village Wooing – by George Bernard Shaw

== 1991 ==
- The Doctor's Dilemma – by George Bernard Shaw
- A Cuckoo in the Nest – by Ben Travers
- Lulu – by Frank Wedekind
- The Millionairess – by George Bernard Shaw
- Henry IV – by Luigi Pirandello
- Hedda Gabler – by Henrik Ibsen
- A Connecticut Yankee – music by Richard Rodgers, lyrics by Lorenz Hart, book by Herbert Fields
- This Happy Breed – by Noël Coward
- Press Cuttings – by George Bernard Shaw

== 1992 ==
- Pygmalion – by George Bernard Shaw
- Counsellor-at-Law – by Elmer Rice
- Charley's Aunt – by Brandon Thomas
- Widowers' Houses – by George Bernard Shaw
- Drums in the Night – by Bertolt Brecht
- Point Valaine – by Noël Coward
- On the Town – music by Leonard Bernstein, books and lyrics by Betty Comden and Adolph Green
- Ten Minute Alibi – by Anthony Armstrong
- Overruled – by George Bernard Shaw

== 1993 ==
- Saint Joan – by George Bernard Shaw
- The Silver King – by Henry Arthur Jones
- Blithe Spirit – by Noël Coward
- Candida – by George Bernard Shaw
- The Unmentionables – by Carl Sternheim
- The Marrying of Anne Leete – by Harley Granville Barker
- Gentlemen Prefer Blondes – music by Jule Styne, lyrics by Leo Robin, book by Anita Loos and Joseph Fields
- And Then There Were None – by Agatha Christie
- The Man of Destiny – by George Bernard Shaw

== 1994 ==
- Arms and the Man – by George Bernard Shaw
- The Front Page – by Ben Hecht and Charles MacArthur
- Sherlock Holmes – by William Gillette
- Too True to Be Good – by George Bernard Shaw
- Eden End – by J.B. Priestley
- Ivona the Princess of Burgundia – by Witold Gombrowicz
- Lady Be Good – music and lyrics by George Gershwin and Ira Gershwin, book by Guy Bolton and Fred Thompson
- Busman's Honeymoon – by Dorothy L. Sayers and Muriel St Clare Byrne
- Rococo – by Harley Granville Barker
- Annajanska the Bolshevik Princess – by George Bernard Shaw

== 1995 ==
- You Never Can Tell – by George Bernard Shaw
- The Petrified Forest – by Robert E. Sherwood
- Cavalcade – by Noël Coward
- The Philanderer – by George Bernard Shaw
- An Ideal Husband – by Oscar Wilde
- Waste – by Harley Granville Barker
- The Voice of the Turtle – by John William Van Druten
- Ladies in Retirement – by Edward Percy and Reginald Denham
- The Zoo – by Arthur Sullivan and B. C. Stephenson
- The Six of Calais – by George Bernard Shaw

== 1996 ==
- The Devil's Disciple – by George Bernard Shaw
- Rashoman – by Fay Kanin and Michael Kanin
- Hobson's Choice – by Harold Brighouse
- An Ideal Husband – by Oscar Wilde
- The Simpleton of the Unexpected Isles – by George Bernard Shaw
- The Playboy of the Western World – by J.M. Synge
- Marsh Hay – by Merrill Denison
- Mr. Cinders – music by Vivian Ellis and Richard Myers, libretto and lyrics by Clifford Grey and Greatrex Newman
- The Hollow – by Agatha Christie
- Shall We Join the Ladies – by J.M. Barrie
- The Conjuror – by David Ben and Patrick Watson

== 1997 ==
- Mrs. Warren's Profession – by George Bernard Shaw
- Hobson's Choice – by Harold Brighouse
- Will Any Gentleman – by Vernon Sylvaine
- The Seagull – by Anton Chekhov
- In Good King Charles's Golden Days – by George Bernard Shaw
- The Playboy of the Western World – by J.M. Synge
- The Children's Hour – by Lillian Hellman
- The Secret Life – by Harley Granville Barker
- The Chocolate Soldier – music by Oscar Straus, adapted and arranged by Ronald Hanmer, original book and lyrics by Rudolf Bernauer and Leopold Jacobson
- The Two Mrs. Carrolls – by Martin Vale
- The Conjuror: Part 2 – by David Ben and Patrick Watson
- Sorry Wrong Number – by Lucille Fletcher

== 1998 ==
- Major Barbara – by George Bernard Shaw
- You Can't Take It with You – by George S. Kaufman and Moss Hart
- Lady Windermere's Fan – by Oscar Wilde
- The Lady's Not for Burning – by Christopher Fry
- John Bull's Other Island – by George Bernard Shaw
- Joy – by John Galsworthy
- A Foggy Day – music and lyrics by George Gershwin and Ira Gershwin, book by Norm Foster and John Mueller
- The Shop at Sly Corner – by Edward Percy
- Passion, Poison and Petrifaction – by George Bernard Shaw
- Brothers in Arms – by Merrill Denison
- A Story of Waterloo – by Arthur Conan Doyle

== 1999 ==
- Heartbreak House – by George Bernard Shaw
- You Can't Take It with You – by George S. Kaufman and Moss Hart
- Easy Virtue – by Noël Coward
- All My Sons – by Arthur Miller
- Getting Married – by George Bernard Shaw
- The Madras House – by Harley Granville Barker
- S.S. Tenacity – by Charles Vildrac
- Uncle Vanya – by Anton Chekhov
- Rebecca – by Daphne du Maurier
- A Foggy Day – music and lyrics by George Gershwin and Ira Gershwin, book by Norm Foster and John Mueller
- Waterloo – by Arthur Conan Doyle
- Village Wooing – by George Bernard Shaw

== 2000 ==
- The Doctor's Dilemma – by George Bernard Shaw
- Easy Virtue – by Noël Coward
- Lord of the Flies – by William Golding
- The Matchmaker – by Thornton Wilder
- A Woman of No Importance – by Oscar Wilde
- The Apple Cart – by George Bernard Shaw
- A Room of One's Own – by Virginia Woolf
- Six Characters in Search of an Author – by Luigi Pirandello
- Time and the Conways – by J.B. Priestley
- She Loves Me – book by Joe Masteroff, music by Jerry Bock, lyrics by Sheldon Harnick
- Still Life – by Noël Coward

== 2001 ==
- The Millionairess – by George Bernard Shaw
- Peter Pan – by J.M. Barrie
- The Man Who Came to Dinner – by Moss Hart and George S. Kaufman
- Picnic – by William Inge
- Fanny's First Play – by George Bernard Shaw
- Six Characters in Search of an Author – by Luigi Pirandello
- The Return of the Prodigal – by St John Hankin
- The Mystery of Edwin Drood – a musical by Rupert Holmes
- Laura – by Vera Caspary and George Sklar
- Love from a Stranger – by Frank Vosper, based on a story by Agatha Christie
- Shadow Play – by Noël Coward

== 2002 ==
- Caesar and Cleopatra – by George Bernard Shaw
- Detective Story – by Sidney Kingsley
- Candida – by George Bernard Shaw
- Hay Fever – by Noël Coward
- The Return of the Prodigal – by St John Hankin
- The House of Bernarda Alba – by Federico García Lorca
- His Majesty – by Harley Granville Barker
- Chaplin – by Simon Bradbury
- The Old Ladies – by Rodney Ackland
- Merrily We Roll Along – music and lyrics by Stephen Sondheim, book by George Furth
- The Old Lady Shows Her Medals – by J.M. Barrie

== 2003 ==
- Misalliance – by George Bernard Shaw
- Three Sisters – by Anton Chekhov
- The Coronation Voyage – by Michel Marc Bouchard
- The Royal Family – by George S. Kaufman
- Widowers' Houses – by George Bernard Shaw
- Diana of Dobson's – by Cicely Hamilton
- The Plough and the Stars – by Seán O'Casey
- Afterplay – by Brian Friel
- On the Twentieth Century – book and lyrics by Betty Comden and Adolph Green, music by Cy Coleman
- Blood Relations – by Sharon Pollock
- Happy End – lyrics by Bertolt Brecht, music by Kurt Weill

== 2004 ==
- Pygmalion – by George Bernard Shaw
- The Importance of Being Earnest – by Oscar Wilde
- Three Men on a Horse – by John Cecil Holm and George Abbott
- Pal Joey – music by Richard Rodgers, lyrics by Lorenz Hart, book by John O'Hara
- Ah, Wilderness! – by Eugene O'Neill
- Rutherford and Son – by Githa Sowerby
- Waiting for the Parade – by John Murrell
- The Tinker's Wedding – by J.M. Synge
- Man and Superman – by George Bernard Shaw
- Nothing Sacred – by George F. Walker
- Harlequinade – by Terence Rattigan
- Floyd Collins – music and lyrics by Adam Guettel, book by Tina Landau

== 2005 ==
- Major Barbara – by George Bernard Shaw
- You Never Can Tell – by George Bernard Shaw
- Gypsy – music by Jule Styne, lyrics by Stephen Sondheim, book by Arthur Laurents
- Journey's End – by R. C. Sherriff
- The Autumn Garden – by Lillian Hellman
- Belle Moral – by Ann-Marie MacDonald
- The Constant Wife – by Somerset Maugham
- Happy End – Music by Kurt Weill, Lyrics by Bertolt Brecht
- Bus Stop – by William Inge
- Something on the Side – (One Act) by Georges Feydeau and Maurice Desvallieres

== 2006 ==
- Arms and the Man – by George Bernard Shaw
- Too True to be Good – by George Bernard Shaw
- High Society – music and lyrics by Cole Porter, book by Arthur Kopit
- The Crucible – by Arthur Miller
- The Magic Fire – by Lillian Groag
- Rosmersholm – by Henrik Ibsen
- Love Among the Russians – by Anton Chekhov
- The Heiress – adapted from Washington Square by Henry James
- The Invisible Man – by Michael O'Brien, adapted from the novel by H. G. Wells
- Design for Living – by Noël Coward

== 2007 ==
- The Philanderer – by George Bernard Shaw
- Saint Joan – by George Bernard Shaw
- Mack and Mabel – music and lyrics by Jerry Herman, book by Michael Stewart
- Hotel Peccadillo – by Georges Feydeau
- The Circle – by Somerset Maugham
- Summer and Smoke – by Tennessee Williams
- A Month in the Country – by Brian Friel, based on the original by Ivan Turgenev
- Tristan – by Paul Sportelli and Jay Turvey
- The Cassillis Engagement – by St. John Hankin
- The Kiltartan Comedies – by Lady Augusta Gregory

== 2008 ==
- An Inspector Calls – by J.B. Priestley
- Wonderful Town – music by Leonard Bernstein, lyrics by Betty Comden, book by Joseph Fields and Jerome Chodorov
- Mrs. Warren's Profession – by George Bernard Shaw
- Follies: The Concert – by Stephen Sondheim
- Getting Married – by George Bernard Shaw
- The Little Foxes – by Lillian Hellman
- After the Dance – by Terence Rattigan
- The President – by Ferenc Molnár
- The Stepmother – by Githa Sowerby
- A Little Night Music – music and lyrics by Stephen Sondheim, book by Hugh Wheeler
- Belle Moral – by Ann-Marie MacDonald

== 2009 ==
- Brief Encounters: Still Life, We Were Dancing and Hands Across the Sea – by Noël Coward
- Play, Orchestra, Play: Red Peppers, Fumed Oak and Shadow Play – by Noël Coward
- Ways of the Heart: Ways and Means, Family Album and The Astonished Heart – by Noël Coward
- Star Chamber – by Noël Coward
- The Entertainer – by John Osborne
- The Devil's Disciple – by George Bernard Shaw
- In Good King Charles's Golden Days – by George Bernard Shaw
- Born Yesterday – by Garson Kanin
- A Moon for the Misbegotten – by Eugene O'Neill
- Albertine in Five Times – by Michel Tremblay
- Sunday in the Park with George – music and lyrics by Stephen Sondheim and book by James Lapine

== 2010 ==
- The Women – by Clare Boothe Luce
- The Doctor's Dilemma – by George Bernard Shaw
- The Cherry Orchard – by Anton Chekhov
- An Ideal Husband – by Oscar Wilde
- John Bull's Other Island – by George Bernard Shaw
- Age of Arousal – by Linda Griffiths
- Harvey – by Mary Coyle Chase
- One Touch of Venus – by Kurt Weill, book by S. J. Perelman and Ogden Nash, lyrics by Ogden Nash
- Half an Hour – by J. M. Barrie
- Serious Money – by Caryl Churchill

== 2011 ==
- Heartbreak House – by George Bernard Shaw
- On the Rocks – by George Bernard Shaw
- Candida – by George Bernard Shaw
- My Fair Lady – book and lyrics by Alan Jay Lerner, music by Frederick Loewe
- Maria Severa – book, music & lyrics by Jay Turvey and Paul Sportelli
- The Admirable Crichton – by J.M. Barrie
- Drama at Inish – A Comedy – by Lennox Robinson
- Cat on a Hot Tin Roof – by Tennessee Williams
- The President – by Ferenc Molnár
- Topdog/Underdog – by Suzan-Lori Parks
- When the Rain Stops Falling – by Andrew Bovell

== 2012 ==
- The Millionairess – by George Bernard Shaw
- Misalliance – by George Bernard Shaw
- A Man and Some Women – by Githa Sowerby
- Ragtime – book by Terrence McNally, music by Stephen Flaherty, based on the novel by E.L. Doctorow
- Present Laughter – by Noël Coward
- Trouble in Tahiti – Music & libretto by Leonard Bernstein
- Hedda Gabler – by Henrik Ibsen
- French Without Tears – by Terence Rattigan
- Come Back, Little Sheba – by William Inge
- Helen’s Necklace – by Carole Fréchette in an English version by John Murrell (playwright)

== 2013 ==
- Guys and Dolls – music and lyrics by Frank Loesser, book by Jo Swerling and Abe Burrows
- Lady Windermere's Fan – by Oscar Wilde
- Enchanted April – by Elizabeth von Arnim, adapted by Matthew Barber
- Peace in Our Time: A Comedy – by John Murrell, adapted from Geneva by George Bernard Shaw
- The Light in the Piazza – book by Craig Lucas, music and lyrics by Adam Guettel
- Trifles – by Susan Glaspell
- Our Betters – by W. Somerset Maugham
- Major Barbara – by George Bernard Shaw
- Faith Healer – by Brian Friel
- Arcadia – by Tom Stoppard

== 2014 ==
- Cabaret – book by Joe Masteroff, lyrics by Fred Ebb, music by John Kander
- The Philadelphia Story – by Philip Barry
- The Philanderer – by George Bernard Shaw
- The Charity That Began at Home – by St. John Hankin
- The Sea – by Edward Bond
- Arms and the Man – by George Bernard Shaw
- When We Are Married – by J.B. Priestley
- Juno and the Paycock – by Seán O'Casey
- The Mountaintop – by Katori Hall
- A Lovely Sunday for Creve Coeur – by Tennessee Williams

== 2015 ==
- Sweet Charity – book by Neil Simon, music by Cy Coleman, lyrics by Dorothy Fields
- Pygmalion – by George Bernard Shaw
- Light Up the Sky – by Moss Hart
- The Lady from the Sea – by Henrik Ibsen, adapted by Erin Shields
- Top Girls – by Caryl Churchill
- The Twelve-Pound Look – By J. M. Barrie
- Peter and the Starcatcher – by Dave Barry and Ridley Pearson, adapted by Rick Elice
- You Never Can Tell – by George Bernard Shaw
- The Divine: A Play for Sarah Bernhardt – by Michel Marc Bouchard, translated by Linda Gaboriau
- The Intelligent Homosexual's Guide to Capitalism and Socialism with a Key to the Scriptures – by Tony Kushner

== 2016 ==
- Alice in Wonderland – by Lewis Carroll, adapted by Peter Hinton-Davis, music by Allen Cole
- A Woman of No Importance – by Oscar Wilde
- Sweeney Todd: The Demon Barber of Fleet Street – music and lyrics by Stephen Sondheim, book by Hugh Wheeler
- Uncle Vanya – by Anton Chekhov
- Mrs. Warren's Profession – by George Bernard Shaw
- "Master Harold"...and the Boys – by Athol Fugard
- Our Town – by Thornton Wilder
- Engaged – by W.S. Gilbert
- The Adventures of the Black Girl in Her Search for God – by George Bernard Shaw, adapted by Lisa Codrington
- The Dance of Death – by August Strindberg, adapted by Richard Greenberg

== 2017 ==
- Me and My Girl – book and lyrics by Douglas Furber and L. Arthur Rose, music by Noel Gay
- Saint Joan – by George Bernard Shaw
- Dracula – by Bram Stoker, adapted by Liz Lochhead
- 1837: The Farmers' Revolt – by Rick Salutin
- Androcles and the Lion – by George Bernard Shaw
- Wilde Tales – by Oscar Wilde
- The Madness of George III – by Alan Bennett
- Dancing at Lughnasa – by Brian Friel
- An Octoroon – by Branden Jacobs-Jenkins
- Middletown – by Will Eno
- 1979 – by Michael Healey

== 2018 ==
- The Magician's Nephew – by C. S. Lewis, adapted for the stage by Michael O'Brien
- Grand Hotel – book by Luther Davis, music and lyrics by Robert Wright and George Forrest, with additional music by Maury Yeston
- Mythos: A Trilogy. Gods. Heroes. Men. – by Stephen Fry
- The Hound of the Baskervilles – by Sir Arthur Conan Doyle, adapted by R. Hamilton Wright and David Pichette
- Stage Kiss – by Sarah Ruhl
- Of Marriage and Men: A Comedy Double-Bill (How He Lied to Her Husband and The Man of Destiny) – by George Bernard Shaw
- O'Flaherty V.C. – by George Bernard Shaw
- Oh What a Lovely War – by Joan Littlewood, Theatre Workshop and Charles Chilton
- A Christmas Carol – by Charles Dickens
- The Orchard (After Chekhov) – by Serena Parmar
- The Baroness and the Pig – by Michael Mackenzie
- Henry V – by William Shakespeare

== 2019 ==
- The Horse and His Boy – by C. S. Lewis, adapted for the stage by Anna Chatterton
- Brigadoon – book and lyrics by Jay Lerner, music by Frederick Loewe
- The Ladykillers – by Graham Linehan, from the motion picture screenplay by William Rose
- Man and Superman with Don Juan in Hell – by Bernard Shaw
- Mahabharata: Beginnings – by Ravi Jain
- Rope – by Patrick Hamilton
- Getting Married – by Bernard Shaw
- The Russian Play – by Hannah Moscovitch
- Cyrano de Bergerac – by Edmond Rostand, translated and adapted for the stage by Kate Hennig
- The Glass Menagerie – by Tennessee Williams
- Sex – by Mae West
- Victory – by Howard Barker
- A Christmas Carol – by Charles Dickens
- Holiday Inn – music and lyrics by Irving Berlin, book by Gordon Greenberg and Chad Hodge

== 2020 ==
Due to the COVID-19 pandemic, it was announced on 26 August 2020, that the entirety of the 2020 season was cancelled, with the possible exception of A Christmas Carol, which may still be performed depending on government guidelines. Previously, on 22 July 2020, it was said there was the possibility that some performances of Charley's Aunt and Flush might begin in September.

- Gypsy – book by Arthur Laurents, music by Jule Styne, lyrics by Stephen Sondheim
- The Devil's Disciple – by Bernard Shaw
- Sherlock Holmes and the Raven’s Curse – by R. Hamilton Wright, based on the works of Sir Arthur Conan Doyle
- Mahabharata – adapted by Ravi Jain and Miriam Fernandes, original concept developed with Jenny Koons
- Charley's Aunt – by Brandon Thomas
- Prince Caspian – adapted for the stage by Damien Atkins, based on the novel by C. S. Lewis
- Flush – based on the novella by Virginia Woolf, adapted and directed by Tim Carroll
- Assassins – book by John Weidman, music and Lyrics by Stephen Sondheim, from an idea by Charles Gilbert, Jr.
- The Playboy of the Western World – by J.M. Synge
- Desire Under the Elms by Eugene O'Neill
- Trouble in Mind – by Alice Childress
- The History of Niagara – created and performed by Mike Petersen and Alexandra Montagnese, at Fort George Historic Site, in association with Parks Canada
- A Christmas Carol – by Charles Dickens
- Me and My Girl – book and lyrics by L. Arthur Rose and Douglas Furber, book revised by Stephen Fry, with contributions by Mike Ockrent, music by Noel Gay. Presented for the Christmas season.

== 2021 ==
For the 2021 season, the Shaw Festival presented many of the productions that were originally scheduled for 2020.

- The Devil's Disciple – by Bernard Shaw
- Sherlock Holmes and the Raven’s Curse – by R. Hamilton Wright, based on the works of Sir Arthur Conan Doyle
- Charley's Aunt – by Brandon Thomas
- Flush – based on the novella by Virginia Woolf, adapted and directed by Tim Carroll
- Desire Under the Elms by Eugene O'Neill
- Trouble in Mind – by Alice Childress
- The History of Niagara – created and performed by Mike Petersen and Alexandra Montagnese, at Fort George Historic Site, in association with Parks Canada
- A Christmas Carol – by Charles Dickens
- Holiday Inn – music and lyrics by Irving Berlin, book by Gordon Greenberg and Chad Hodge

Gypsy, originally planned for the 2020 season, and then intended to be staged in 2021, has now been postponed until the 2023 season.

The productions that were originally scheduled, and subsequently cancelled, for 2020 and not planned for 2021 are: Mahabharata, Prince Caspian, Assassins, The Playboy of the Western World, and Me and My Girl.

== 2022 ==
- Damn Yankees – book by George Abbott and Douglass Wallop, music and lyrics by Richard Adler and Jerry Ross
- The Importance of Being Earnest – by Oscar Wilde
- The Doctor's Dilemma – by George Bernard Shaw
- Cyrano de Bergerac – by Edmond Rostand, translated and adapted for the stage by Kate Hennig
- Gaslight – by Johnna Wright and Patty Jamieson
- Chitra – by Rabindranath Tagore
- Just To Get Married – by Cicely Hamilton
- This Is How We Got Here – by Keith Barker
- Too True to be Good – by George Bernard Shaw
- Everybody – by Branden Jacobs-Jenkins
- Gem of the Ocean – by August Wilson
- A Short History of Niagara – by Alexandra Montagnese and Mike Petersen
- Fairground and Shawground
- A Christmas Carol – by Charles Dickens
- White Christmas – music and lyrics by Irving Berlin, book by David Ives and Paul Blake

== 2023 ==
- Mahabharata – written and adapted by Ravi Jain and Miriam Fernandes
- Gypsy – book by Arthur Laurents, music by Jule Styne, lyrics by Stephen Sondheim
- Blithe Spirit – by Noël Coward
- The Amen Corner – by James Baldwin
- Prince Caspian – adapted for the stage by Damien Atkins, based on the novel by C.S. Lewis
- On the Razzle – by Tom Stoppard
- Village Wooing – by Bernard Shaw
- The Shadow of a Doubt – by Edith Wharton
- The Playboy of the Western World – by J.M. Synge
- The Apple Cart – by Bernard Shaw
- The Clearing – by Helen Edmundson
- The Game of Love and Chance – by Pierre de Marivaux
- Mother, Daughter – by Selma Dimitrijevic
- A Short History of Niagara – by Alexandra Montagnese and Mike Petersen
- Brigadoon – book and lyrics by Alan Jay Lerner, music by Frederick Loewe
- A Christmas Carol – by Charles Dickens

== 2024 ==
- My Fair Lady
- One Man, Two Guvnors
- Sherlock Holmes and the Mystery of the Human Heart
- Witness for the Prosecution
- The Secret Garden
- The Orphan of Chao
- Candida
- The House That Will Not Stand
- Snow in Midsummer

== 2025 ==
Shows announced for the 2025 season:

- The Lion, the Witch and the Wardrobe
- Anything Goes
- Wait Until Dark
- Tons of Money
- Major Barbara
- Murder-On-The-Lake
- GNIT
- Blues for an Alabama Sky
- Dear Liar
- The Frogs
- La Vie En Rose
- White Christmas
- A Christmas Carol

== Frequency of production of Shaw's plays ==
- The Admirable Bashville – 1974
- Androcles and the Lion – 1963, 1984, 2017
- Annajanska, the Bolshevik Empress – 1994
- The Apple Cart – 1966, 1976, 2000, 2023
- Arms and the Man – 1967, 1976, 1986, 1994, 2006, 2014
- Augustus Does His Bit – 1987
- Back to Methuselah – 1969, 1986
- Caesar and Cleopatra – 1975, 1983, 2002
- Candida – 1962, 1970, 1983, 1993, 2002, 2011, 2024
- Captain Brassbound's Conversion – 1979
- The Dark Lady of the Sonnets – 1964, 1988
- The Devil's Disciple – 1974, 1984, 1996, 2009, 2021
- The Doctor's Dilemma – 1969, 1991, 2000, 2010, 2022
- The Fascinating Foundling – 1984
- Fanny's First Play – 1973, 1987, 2001
- Geneva – 1988
- Getting Married – 1972, 1989, 1999, 2008, 2019
- The Glimpse of Reality – 1989
- Great Catherine – 1977
- Heartbreak House – 1964, 1968, 1978, 1985, 1999, 2011
- How He Lied to Her Husband – 1963, 1984, 2018
- The Inca of Perusalem – 1985
- In Good King Charles's Golden Days – 1981, 1997, 2009
- John Bull's Other Island – 1964, 1985, 1998, 2010
- Major Barbara – 1967, 1978, 1987, 1998, 2005, 2013, 2025
- The Man of Destiny – 1963, 1981, 1993, 2018
- Man and Superman – 1962, 1966, 1977, 1989, 2004, 2019
- The Millionairess – 1965, 1977, 1991, 2001, 2012
- Misalliance – 1966, 1972, 1980, 1990, 2003, 2012
- Mrs. Warren's Profession – 1976, 1990, 1997, 2008, 2016
- The Music Cure – 1982
- O'Flaherty V.C. – 1971, 1983, 2018
- On the Rocks – 1986, 2011
- Overruled – 1980, 1992
- Passion, Poison and Petrifaction – 1986, 1998
- The Philanderer – 1971, 1980, 1995, 2007, 2014
- Press Cuttings – 1971, 1991
- Pygmalion – 1965, 1975, 1982, 1992, 2004, 2015
- Saint Joan – 1981, 1993, 2007, 2017
- Shakes versus Shav – 1989
- The Simpleton of the Unexpected Isles – 1983, 1996
- The Six of Calais – 1995
- Too True to be Good – 1974, 1982, 1994, 2006, 2022
- You Never Can Tell – 1963, 1973, 1979, 1988, 1995, 2005, 2015
- Village Wooing – 1964, 1979, 1990, 1999, 2023
- Widower's Houses – 1977, 1992, 2003

Note: The following original theatrical works by Shaw have never been produced at the Shaw Festival: Buoyant Billions, Cymbeline Refinished, Farfetched Fables, The Shewing-Up of Blanco Posnet, and Why She Would Not.

== Bibliography ==
- Holmes, Katherine, ed. (1986). Celebrating!: twenty-five years on the stage at the Shaw Festival. Erin, Ontario: Boston Mills Press. ISBN 0-919783-48-1.
