= Esmé Percy =

English actor (1887–1957)

- as Lord Byron (1929)
- Born: 8 August 1887; London, England
- Died: 17 June 1957 (aged 69); Brighton, Sussex, England
- Occupation: Actor
- Years active: 1904–1956

Saville Esmé Percy (8 August 1887 – 17 June 1957) was an English actor and director, widely associated with the plays of Bernard Shaw; he also appeared in forty films between 1930 and 1956.

He studied acting in Paris with Sarah Bernhardt and made a career as a stage actor in England, appearing in the companies of F. R. Benson, William Poel, Herbert Beerbohm Tree and later in his career, Basil Dean and Robert Atkins. He appeared frequently on radio and television, from 1927 until the year of his death, and produced eight BBC Radio adaptations of Shaw plays.

== Life and career ==
=== Early years ===
Saville Esmé Percy was born in London on 8 August 1887. He was educated at Windsor and Brussels, where he decided on a stage career. He studied at the Royal Conservatory of Brussels and then the Paris Conservatoire, under Georges Berr, Maurice Leloir and Sarah Bernhardt. His English stage début was in February 1904 with F. R. Benson's company on tour in Nottingham. He made his London début the following year as Romeo in William Poel's production of Romeo and Juliet opposite Dorothy Minto. The theatrical newspaper The Era commented, "Mr Percy was quite a boyish lover, and the points upon which he may fairly be commended were his earnestness and his intelligent and natural reading of the text".

As Hamlet, 1924

Percy joined Herbert Beerbohm Tree's company at His Majesty's Theatre in 1906. He was a strikingly good-looking young man, and Sir John Gielgud recalled in his memoirs that Tree's wife, finding her husband dining tête-à-tête with Percy, left them together, with the words, "The port's on the sideboard, Herbert, and remember it's adultery just the same!" In Tree's company Percy played Britannicus in Stephen Phillips's Nero, the Earl of March in Henry IV, Part 1 and Lucius in Julius Caesar. In 1907 Percy toured South Africa, playing leading roles in classic plays, after which, returning to England, he rejoined Benson's company, now taking the star roles, including Hamlet, Shylock and Macbeth. In 1912 he co-starred with Edith Evans in the title roles in Troilus and Cressida.

After spending nearly two years with Annie Horniman's company in Manchester he co-founded a touring company, presenting and appearing in a wide range of plays, including The Voysey Inheritance, The Doctor's Dilemma, The Importance of Being Earnest and Man and Superman.

=== First World War to Second World War ===
Percy enlisted in the First World War and became a commissioned officer in the Highland Light Infantry in 1916. He served in France and with the Army of Occupation in Germany, until 1923. In Germany he was officer-in-charge of the army's dramatic company, and produced more than 140 plays. After leaving the army he joined Basil Dean's Reandean company as an assistant director and also acting in Dean's highly successful production of James Elroy Flecker's Hassan (1923).

Although Percy had already appeared in Shaw plays, his closer association with the playwright's works began in 1924, when he was appointed general producer to Charles Macdona's Bernard Shaw Repertory Company. Besides directing all the productions he appeared as Shaw's Don Juan Tenorio, Blanco Posnet, Androcles, Louis Dubedat, Henry Higgins, John Tanner, St John Hotchkiss and Valentine.

Percy had spells with the Masque Theatre in Edinburgh and Glasgow, as producer and leading man. Through the 1930s he was mostly in West End productions, with roles ranging from King Magnus in The Apple Cart and Baptista in The Taming of the Shrew to Humpty Dumpty in Alice Through the Looking Glass. In 1939 he toured with Shaw plays until the outbreak of war, after which he joined Robert Atkins's company at the Open Air Theatre, Regent's Park and the Vaudeville Theatre, in roles including Peter Quince in A Midsummer Night's Dream, Parolles in All's Well That Ends Well and Hotspur in Henry IV, Part 1. In other wartime productions he played multiple roles in The Tales of Hoffmann (in which one critic compared his singing to that of Henry Lytton) and Lord Caversham in Robert Donat's production of An Ideal Husband with Irene Vanbrugh and Martita Hunt (1943).

=== Later years ===
After the war Percy played numerous leading parts in plays on radio and television. He co-directed with Gielgud, and played in, The Lady's Not for Burning (1949), produced Shaw's Buoyant Billions at the Malvern Festival, 1949 and subsequently in the West End. He directed James Joyce's Exiles at the Q Theatre (1950) and played Gayev in The Cherry Orchard opposite Gwen Ffrangcon-Davies at the Lyric (1954).

His last stage roles were Nicholas in The Burnt Flower Bed (Arts Theatre, 1955), First God in The Good Woman of Setzuan (Royal Court Theatre, 1956), Sir Jasper Fidget in The Country Wife, (Royal Court, 1956), Victor in Gigi (New Theatre, 1956; The Stage commented, "Esmé Percy brings to the small part of a man-servant the technique that has won him distinction on a thousand stages"), and finally The Principal in Jean Giraudoux's The Apollo de Bellac with a cast including Richard Pasco, John Osborne, Alan Bates and Robert Stephens.

Percy died in his sleep at the age of 69 in Brighton, where he was in rehearsal for the pre-London try-out of a new play, The Making of Moo.

== Radio and television ==
=== Radio ===
Percy made numerous broadcasts for BBC Radio, beginning in 1927 with a talk titled "Bernard Shaw from the Actor's Point of View". His first participation in a radio drama was in June 1932 as the Evil Angel in Marlowe's Doctor Faustus, a play he returned to in 1940, playing Lucifer, and again in 1956, when he played Mephistophilis to the Faustus of Stephen Murray. He appeared in plays, or adaptations of books, ranging from comedies by Aristophanes, Chekhov, Sheridan and Wilde to classics by Dante, Dickens, Euripides, Shakespeare, Spenser and Webster to works by Anouilh, Barrie, Calderon, Henry James, Sardou and Josephine Tey. He appeared in Shaw's The Apple Cart, Man and Superman and Mrs Warren's Profession and produced eight Shaw plays: Back to Methuselah, Caesar and Cleopatra, Heartbreak House, John Bull's Other Island, On the Rocks, The Millionairess, Too True to Be Good, Widowers' Houses and You Never Can Tell.

=== Television ===
He made his first television appearance in 1937 in scenes from Nancy Price's stage adaptation of Through the Looking-Glass as Humpty Dumpty, and starred the following year as Bosola in The Duchess of Malfi. He appeared in The Lady's Not for Burning with Gielgud and Richard Burton in 1952. One of his last television appearances was in July 1956, when he took part in a discussion programme marking Shaw's centenary, with Sybil Thorndike, Lewis Casson, John Clements, Benn W. Levy and Lionel Hale.

== Partial filmography ==
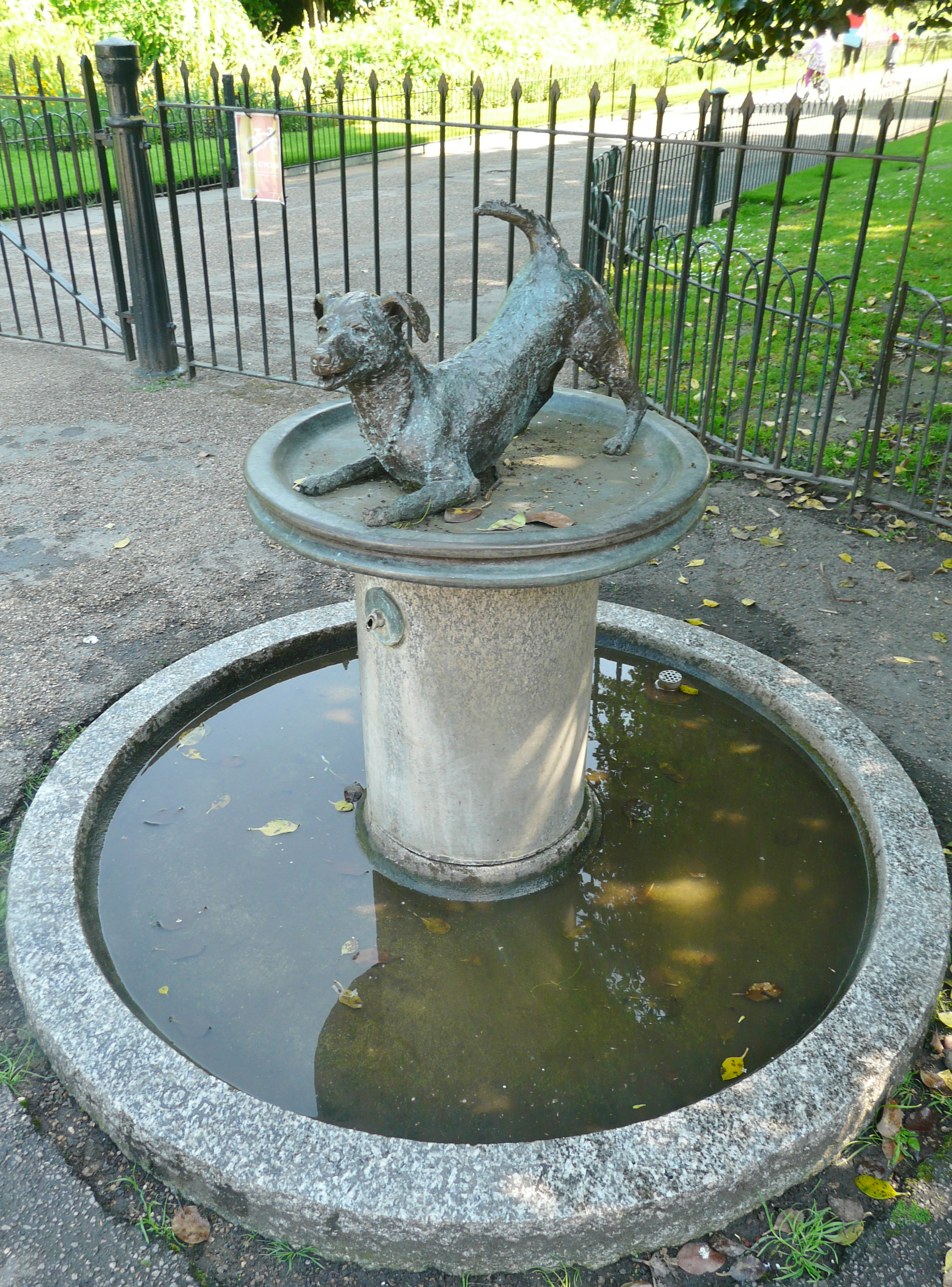
Esme Percy Memorial, Kensington Gardens

- Murder! (1930) - Handel Fane
- The Lucky Number (1932) - The Chairman
- Bitter Sweet (1933) - Hugh Devon
- Summer Lightning (1933) - Baxter
- On Secret Service (1933) - Bleuntzli - Reporter
- Love, Life and Laughter (1934) - Goebschen
- Nell Gwyn (1934) - Samuel Pepys
- Lord Edgware Dies (1934) - Duke of Merton
- Unfinished Symphony (1934) - Huettenbrenner
- Regal Cavalcade (1935) - Lloyd George
- It Happened in Paris (1935) - Pommier
- Abdul the Damned (1935) - Ali - Chief Eunuch
- Invitation to the Waltz (1935) - Napoleon Bonaparte
- The Invader (1936) - Jose
- The Amateur Gentleman (1936) - John Townsend
- A Woman Alone (1936) - General Petroff
- Song of Freedom (1936) - Gabriel Donozetti
- Land Without Music (1936) - Austrian Ambassador
- Crime Over London (1936) - (uncredited)
- Accused (1936) - Morel
- Jump for Glory (1937) - Robinson
- The Frog (1937) - Philo Johnson
- Our Fighting Navy (1937) - Diego de Costa
- The Return of the Scarlet Pimpernel (1937) - Sheridan, the playwright
- Pygmalion (1938) - Count Aristid Karpathy
- 21 Days (1940) - Henry Wallen
- Jeannie (1941)
- Hi Gang! (1941) - Lord Chamberlain
- The Young Mr. Pitt (1942) - Minor Role (uncredited)
- Dead of Night (1945) - Antique Dealer (segment "The Haunted Mirror")
- Caesar and Cleopatra (1945) - Major Domo
- Lisbon Story (1946) - Mariot
- The Ghosts of Berkeley Square (1947) - Vizier

== Sources ==
- Gielgud, John (1979). An Actor and His Time. London: Sidgwick and Jackson. ISBN 0-28-398573-9.
- Parker, John, ed. (1939). Who's Who in the Theatre (ninth ed.). London: Sir Isaac Pitman and Sons. OCLC 473894893.
- Parker, John, ed. (1947). Who's Who in the Theatre (tenth ed.). London: Sir Isaac Pitman and Sons. OCLC 225162446.
