= Margaret Rawlings =

English actress (1906–1996)

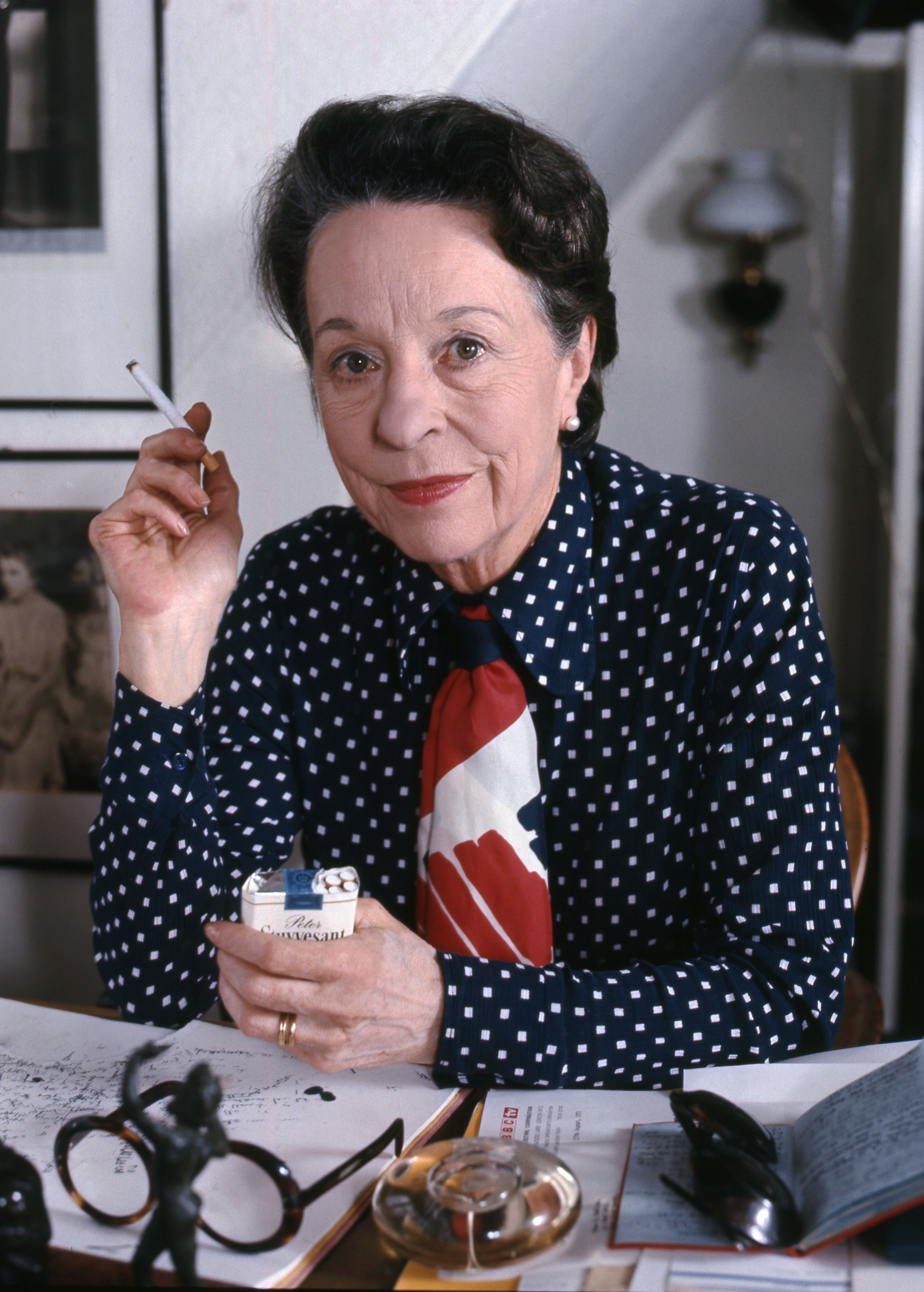
Portrait by Allan Warren

Margaret Rawlings, Lady Barlow (5 June 1906 – 19 May 1996) was an English stage actress and translator, born in Osaka, Japan, daughter of the Rev. George William Rawlings and his wife Lilian (née Boddington) Rawlings.

== Personal life/affiliations ==
She was educated at Oxford High School and Lady Margaret Hall, Oxford. She first married Gabriel Toyne (marriage dissolved) and then Sir Robert Barlow (knighted 1943) who pre-deceased her.

Her entries in Who's Who in the Theatre record her private address as 10 Duke Street, Adelphi, London WC2 (1936), Flat 12, 72 Westbourne Terrace, London W2 (1939), then finally Rocketer Farm, Wendover, Buckinghamshire (from 1947 onwards).

She was a co-founder of Equity, serving as a Council member for 30 years and was twice appointed Vice-President, in 1973–74 and 1975–76.

== Theatre career ==
While still at Oxford, Rawlings appeared at the Little Theatre with John Masefield's company. She made her professional debut in March 1927 with The Macdona Players as Jennifer in The Doctor's Dilemma at Croydon, and subsequently also played in The Philanderer, Arms and the Man, You Never Can Tell and The Dark Lady of the Sonnets.

She made her London stage debut on 22 January 1928 with the Venturers company as Louise in Jordan at the Strand Theatre, then toured as Gwen in The Fanatics and as Jill in Chance Acquaintance. In October 1928 at the Embassy Theatre she played Vivian Mason in The Seventh Guest and Moya in The Shadow, before touring with Maurice Colbourne and Barry Jones in Shaw repertory to Canada and the United States in 1929–30.

=== 1930s ===
Roles included:

- Nora Tanner in The Last Chapter, New Theatre May 1930
- Minn Lee in the Edgar Wallace thriller On the Spot, Paris 1930
- Title role in Oscar Wilde's Salome, Gate Theatre May 1931
- Bianco Capello in The Venetian, Masque Theatre, New York debut, 31 October 1931
- Elizabeth in The Barretts of Wimpole Street (Rudolph Besier), Criterion, Sydney 23 April 1932; subsequently appearing as Lu in The Good Fairy and She in Happy and Glorious
- Fabienne in I Hate Men (Peter Godfrey wrote and directed) co-starring with Hermione Gingold and Gabriel Toyne, Gate Theatre February 1933
- Ricciarda in Night's Candles (Lorenzaccio by Alfred de Musset) co-starring with Ernest Milton, Shilling Theatre, Fulham May 1933
- Mary Fitton in This Side Idolatry (Talbot Jennings) co-starring with Leslie Howard as William Shakespeare, Lyric Theatre October 1933
- Liza Kingdom in The Old Folks at Home (H M Harwood wrote and co-directed), Queen's Theatre December 1933
- Josephine in Napoleon (Alfred Sangster) to Edward Chapman as Bonaparte, Embassy Theatre September 1934
- Jean in The Greeks Had a Word for It (Zoe Akins), co-starring with Hermione, Angela Baddeley and Robert Newton, Duke of York's Theatre November 1934 and subsequently Cambridge Theatre January 1935.
- Loulou in Roulette with Robert Newton May 1935 and subsequently Cambridge Theatre June 1935.
- Ann Whitefield in Man and Superman and Eliza Doolittle in Pygmalion (Bernard Shaw) for the Macdona Players, Cambridge Theatre August 1935
- Katherine "Kitty" O'Shea in Parnell (Elsie T Schauffler), Ethel Barrymore Theatre New York November 1935 – 99 performances
- Katherine "Kitty" O'Shea in Parnell (which she had partly rewritten to enable the play to be licensed for London performance), Gate Theatre April 1936 (co-starring with Wyndham Goldie in the title role); and New Theatre November 1936
- Charmian in Antony and Cleopatra directed by Theodore Komisarjevsky, New Theatre October 1936
- Lady Macbeth for the OUDS, Oxford February 1937
- Mary Charrington and Lily James in Black Limelight (Gordon Sherry), Q Theatre and St James's Theatre April 1937
- Helen in The Trojan Women (Euripides/Gilbert Murray) directed by Lewis Casson, Adelphi Theatre December 1937
- Karen Selby in The Flashing Stream (Charles Morgan), Lyric Theatre September 1938; and appeared in the same role at the Biltmore Theatre New York, April 1939
- Eliza Doolittle in Pygmalion co-starring with Basil Sydney as Higgins, Embassy Theatre May 1939; Theatre Royal Haymarket June 1939
- Stephanie Easton in You, Of All People (Peter Rosser) co-starring with Leslie Banks and Lilli Palmer, Apollo Theatre, December 1939

=== 1940s ===
- Verna Mountstephan in A House in the Square (Diana Morgan), St Martin's Theatre April 1940
- Mrs Dearth in Dear Brutus (J M Barrie directed by John Gielgud, Globe Theatre January 1941
- Gwendolen in The Importance of Being Earnest (Wilde), Theatre Royal Haymarket April 1946
- Titania in The Fairy Queen, Covent Garden December 1946
- Vittoria Corombona in The White Devil (John Webster), Duchess Theatre March 1947
- Marceline in The Unquiet Spirit (Jean-Jacques Bernard), Arts Theatre February 1949
- Germaine in A Woman in Love (adapted and directed by Michael Redgrave), Embassy Theatre April 1949

=== 1950s ===
- The Countess in The Purple Fig Tree (George Ralli), Piccadilly Theatre February 1950
- Lady Macbeth to the Macbeth of Alec Clunes, who also directed, Arts Theatre June 1950
- Anna Sergievna in Spring at Marino (Constance Cox) directed by John Fernald, Arts Theatre February 1951
- Zabrina in Tamburlaine the Great (Christopher Marlowe) co-starring with Donald Wolfit in the title role and directed by Tyrone Guthrie, Old Vic September 1951
- Lysistrata in The Apple Cart (Bernard Shaw) co-starring with Noël Coward as King Magnus, Theatre Royal Haymarket, May 1953
- The Countess in The Dark is Light Enough (Christopher Fry directed by Peter Brook, touring Arts Theatre, Salisbury and Windsor 1955
- Mistress Ford in The Merry Wives of Windsor and Paulina in The Winter's Tale (to Paul Rogers' Falstaff and Leontes), Old Vic 1955–56 season
- Title role in Phedre (Jean Racine), Theatre-in-the-Round November 1957 and tour

=== 1960s ===
- Title role in Sappho, Edinburgh Festival August 1961
- Alex Bliss in Ask Me No More, Theatre Royal Windsor May 1962
- Title role in Phedre (also translated) Arts Cambridge May 1963
- Ella Rentheim in John Gabriel Borkman (Ibsen), Duchess Theatre, December 1963
- Jocasta in Oedipus the King, Nottingham Playhouse November 1964
- Gertrude in Hamlet, Ludlow Festival July 1965
- Usula Maria Torpe in Torpe's Hotel, Yvonne Arnaud Theatre Guildford October 1965
- Mrs Bridgenorth in Getting Married (Bernard Shaw) directed by Frank Dunlop, Strand Theatre April 1967
- Carlotta in A Song at Twilight (Noël Coward) ? 1968

=== 1970s ===
- Giza in Catsplay, Greenwich Theatre October 1973
- Appeared in Mixed Economy, King's Head 1977
- Empress Eugenie in a solo touring performance, Cambridge Festival July 1978; May Fair Theatre and Vaudeville Theatre February 1979; Yvonne Arnaud Theatre July 1979; and the Dublin Festival, October 1979

== Films/television ==
=== Films ===
- The Way of Lost Souls (1929) – Woman
- Roman Holiday (1953) – Countess Vereberg
- Twist of Fate (1954) - Marie Galt (U.S. ' Beautiful Stranger ')
- No Road Back (1957) – Mrs. Railton
- Hands of the Ripper (1971) – Madame Bullard
- Follow Me! (1972) – Mrs. Sidley
- Jekyll & Hyde (1990) – Jekyll's Mother (final film role)

=== Television ===
- The Plane Makers (1964) – Marion Brown
- Wives and Daughters (1971) – Mrs. Hamley

== Writing ==
Rawlings' blank-verse translation of Phèdre by Jean Racine was produced in London in 1957, with Rawlings in the title role. As of 2026, her translation is still in print in Penguin Classics' bilingual edition.
