= Overruled =

Overruled may refer to:

- A response to an objection in United States law
- Overruled (play), a 1912 play by George Bernard Shaw
- Overruled!, a 2009 Canadian children's television sitcom
