= Richard Huggett =

Richard Huggett may refer to:

- Richard Huggett (political candidate)
- Richard Huggett (playwright)
- Richard Huggett (actor)
