= The Man of Destiny =

1897 play by George Bernard Shaw

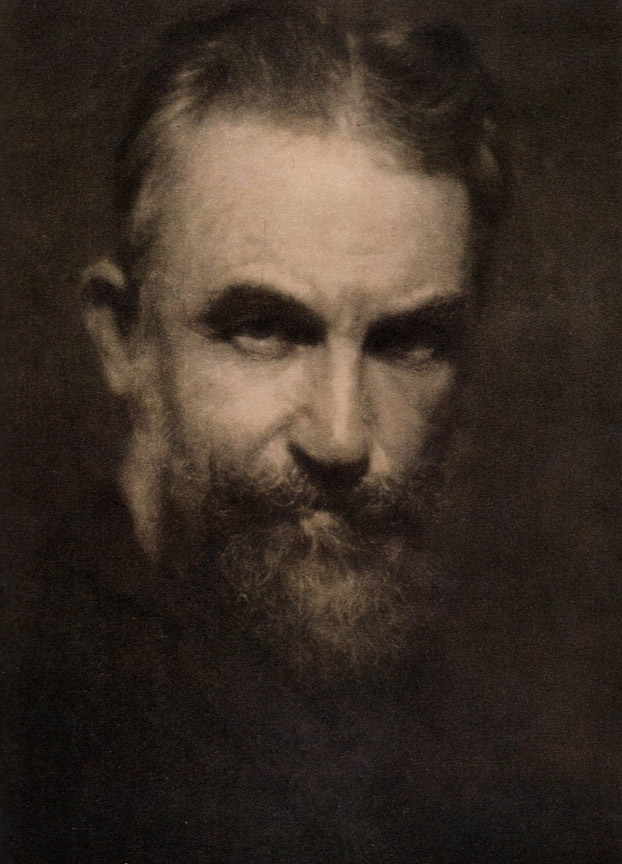
- Original language: English
- Written by: George Bernard Shaw
- Subject: A woman attempts to outwit Napoleon
- Genre: Chamber piece
- Setting: An inn at Tavazzano

Premiere
- Date: 1 July 1897
- Place: Grand Theatre, Croydon

The Man of Destiny (Shavian: 𐑞𐑩 𐑥𐑨𐑯 𐑪𐑝 𐑛𐑧𐑕𐑑𐑦𐑯𐑰) is an 1897 play by George Bernard Shaw, set in Italy during the early career of Napoleon. It was published as a part of Plays Pleasant, which also included Arms and the Man, Candida and You Never Can Tell. Shaw titled the volume Plays Pleasant in order to contrast it with his first book of plays, Plays Unpleasant.

== Characters ==
- Napoleon Bonaparte
- Sub-Lieutenant
- Giuseppe Grandi
- Strange Lady

== Plot ==
12 May 1796, an inn at Tavazzano. After his victory at the Battle of Lodi, Napoleon eats his meal, works on his plans and talks with the innkeeper Giuseppe Grandi. A lieutenant arrives with bad news. The dispatches he was carrying have been stolen by a youth who tricked him out of them. Napoleon says he will be arrested for dereliction of duty. The lieutenant says he can hear the voice of the youth who tricked him. A woman appears. She says that the dispatches were stolen by her brother. Napoleon is unconvinced. He orders the lieutenant out, and tells the woman to hand over the dispatches. A battle of wits ensues between Napoleon and the woman, but she eventually concedes and hands over the documents. However, she says he should not read one of the documents. It is a letter claiming that Napoleon's wife Josephine has been having an affair with Paul Barras. If he is known to have read the letter, it will cause a duel. Napoleon, concerned about a public scandal, decides to pretend that the dispatches are still missing. He calls the lieutenant back, and tells him to go and find the missing documents or be court-martialled. To save the lieutenant from disgrace, the lady leaves and switches to her male disguise. As soon as she reappears, the lieutenant recognises the "brother" who robbed him. Pretending to have magical powers, she finds the dispatches in Napoleon's coat. Napoleon says he has been outwitted by an Englishwoman, and makes a series of comments about the English ability to constantly have things both ways ("As the great champion of freedom and national independence, he conquers and annexes half the world, and calls it Colonization"). He gives the woman the letter unopened; she burns it.

== Productions ==
The play was written for Ellen Terry and Richard Mansfield, but was first performed, on 1 July 1897, at the Grand Theatre, Croydon, with Murray Carson and Florence West in the principal roles. The play was the first Shaw work performed in the German language when it was given in a translation by Siegfried Trebitsch at the Schauspielhaus in Frankfurt on 20 April 1903. The play had its first radio broadcast on 20 April 1928, with Esme Percy as Napoleon.

A version aired on BBC television in 1939, and is believed to be lost.

A version of it aired on Australian television in 1963 and 1967.

An American television version was broadcast on 21 November 1973, with Stacy Keach as Bonaparte and Samantha Eggar as The Lady.

A radio production directed by Pat Trueman was broadcast on BBC Radio 4 on 8 May 1980, with David Suchet as Napoleon and Paola Dionisotti as The Lady.

A BBC TV version was broadcast on 5 May 1981, with Simon Callow as Napoleon, Delphine Seyrig as The Lady and David Troughton as The Lieutenant.
