= Waste (play) =

English play in two different versions (1906 and 1927)

Waste is a play by the English author Harley Granville Barker. It exists in two wholly different versions, from 1906 and 1927. The first version was refused a licence by the Lord Chamberlain and had to be performed privately by the Stage Society in 1907; the second was finally staged in public at the Westminster Theatre in 1936.

== Plot ==
The plot centres around ambitious independent politician Henry Trebell, his plans for a bill to disestablish the Church of England and his fall from grace and suicide after his affair with married woman Amy O'Connell, who dies after a botched abortion. The title may refer to the waste of his potential talents due to the scandal, the loss of the disestablishment bill and the termination of Amy's pregnancy.

== Dramatis personae (1927 version) ==
- Gilbert Wedgecroft, Trebell's doctor
- Walter Kent, Trebell's secretary
- Amy O'Connell, Trebell's lover
- Russell Blackborough, Tory MP and financier
- Justin O'Connell, Amy's estranged Irish husband
- Lord Charles Cantilupe, Tory MP
- Henry Trebell, Independent and later Tory MP
- Lady Mortimer, Lady Julia's mother
- Bertha, the Trebells' maid
- Frances Trebell, Henry's sister
- Cyril Horsham, Tory Prime Minister
- Lucy Davenport, Kent's fiancee
- Butler at the Farrant residence
- Vivian Saumarez, Horsham's secretary
- George Farrant, Tory MP
- Lady Julia Farrant, George's wife

== Production history ==
Recent productions include John Barton's in 1985 for the Royal Shakespeare Company at the Barbican, with Daniel Massey as Trebell and Judi Dench as Amy, one in 1997 at the Old Vic by the Peter Hall Company (with Michael Pennington as Trebell, Anna Carteret as Frances and Peter Blythe as Charles Cantilupe) and a well-received one at the Almeida Theatre (directed by Samuel West and starring Will Keen as Trebell, Nancy Carroll as Amy and Phoebe Nicholls as Frances). Recent North American productions include one in 1995 at the Shaw Festival (directed by Neil Munro) and one in 2000 directed by Bartlett Sher. In November 2015, the National Theatre revived the play, directed by Roger Michell and starring Charles Edwards as Trebell and Olivia Williams as Amy, using the 1927 version of the text.

The first radio production was produced by Val Gielgud on the Third Programme in 1947 and starred Andrew Cruickshank. Stephen Murray starred in a 1959 version of 1947 adaptation on the Home Service. The most recent dramatisation was broadcast on the World Service in 1995 and featured Rachel Weisz, Penelope Wilton and Timothy West.
