= Press Cuttings =

1909 play by George Bernard Shaw

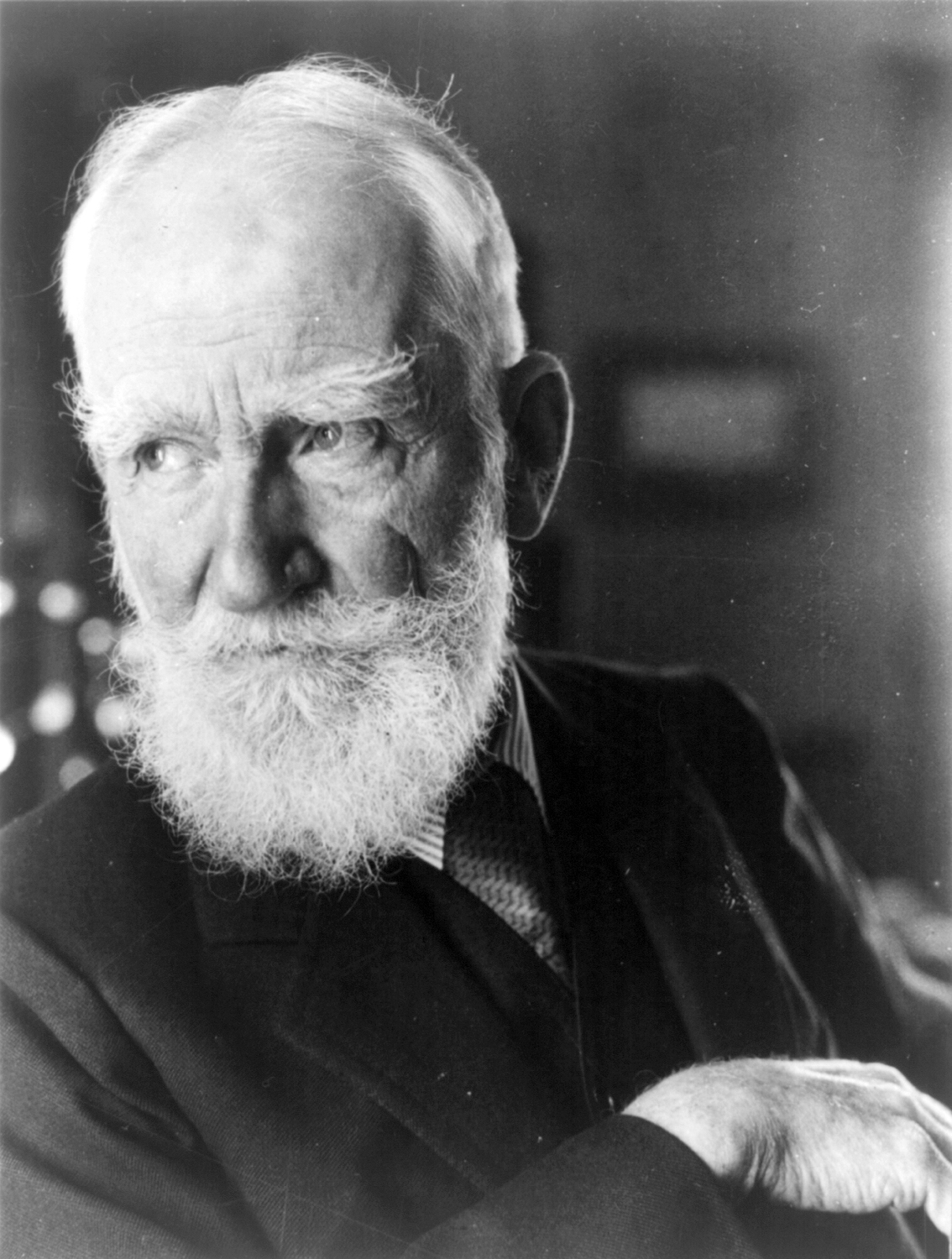
- Written by: George Bernard Shaw
- Original language: English
- Subject: Female supporters and opponents of votes for women terrify male politicians.
- Genre: political satire
- Setting: The War Office, London in 1912

Premiere
- Date premiered: 9 July 1909 (Civic and Dramatic Guild)
- Place premiered: Royal Court Theatre

Press Cuttings (1909), subtitled A Topical Sketch Compiled from the Editorial and Correspondence Columns of the Daily Papers, is a play by George Bernard Shaw. It is a farcical comedy about the suffragettes' campaign for votes for women in Britain. The play is a departure from Shaw's earlier Ibsenesque dramas on social issues. Shaw's own pro-feminist views are never articulated by characters in the play, but instead it ridicules the arguments of the anti-suffrage campaigners.

Written in 1909, the play is set three years in the then future, on April Fool's Day 1912, by which date the actions of the suffragettes are imagined to have led the government to declare martial law in central London. Because of potentially libellous satire of real politicians, the play was originally censored in Britain, but was soon performed in public with minor alterations.

== Characters ==
- General Mitchener, Minister of War
- Prime Minister Balsquith
- Mrs Rosa Carmina Banger, anti-suffrage leader
- Lady Corinthia Fanshawe, anti-suffrage leader
- Mrs Farrell, charwoman
- An orderly

== Plot ==
A room in the War Office on 1 April 1912. General Mitchener is in a state of considerable anxiety about the number of Suffragettes chaining themselves to government buildings. He has had all the railings removed, but is informed by an orderly that another suffragette has padlocked herself to the door scraper. Surprisingly, he has received a letter from the Prime Minister, Balsquith, telling him to release the woman and let her into the building. When he does so, he learns that this suffragette is none other than the Prime Minister himself, disguised as a woman. As he tried to get to the War Office, there were so many suffragettes chasing him that he thought the safest option was to pretend to be one of them. Balsquith informs Mitchener that his arch-rival General Sandstone has resigned from the government, since his plan of creating a male-only exclusion zone of two miles around Westminster has failed. Women are refusing to leave. Mitchener is in favour of the plan, offering Balsquith his usual advice: "shoot them down". Balsquith says events are getting out of control. Already a pro-suffrage curate has been flogged by an army lieutenant, who fails to realise that the curate has aunts in the peerage. Britain needs to concentrate on the threat of German rearmament, but is distracted by these domestic issues.

Mitchener says that the solution to the German problem is simple - shoot them down. Balsquith points out that the Germans might shoot back. Mitchener says he's been wanting to invade them for years. Britain needs to think ahead. Soon it may be possible to travel to the Moon, and if the Germans get there first there is a real prospect of a "German moon". Meanwhile, he suggests that the lieutenant should be flogged in reprisal for his actions, but Balsquith reminds him that the man's father donated a large sum to party funds. He suggests that Mitchener should charm one of the aunts, Lady Richmond, and offer to promote the curate. The General asks his housekeeper Mrs Farrell to find a uniform for him, as he needs to look his best to see Lady Richmond. It should be one befitting a hero who has risked his life in battle. Mrs Farrell says she has risked hers giving birth to eight children; risking life to create more life is better than risking it to destroy the lives of others.

The orderly announces that Mrs Banger and Lady Corinthia Fanshawe, leaders of the anti-suffrage movement, have arrived. Balsquith, he says, fled as soon as he saw them. Mitchener is shocked by the orderly's derogatory comments about the Prime Minister, but the orderly tells him that he wouldn't be in the army if it weren't for conscription, and now that he is, he trusts sergeants more than generals. Mitchener orders the orderly to arrest himself for insubordination. Mrs Banger and Lady Corinthia enter. They declare that the men have failed to defeat the suffragettes. New tactics are needed. Mrs Banger says that the suffragettes have got it all wrong. Women don't want to vote, they want to join the army. In fact most great leaders, including Bismarck and Napoleon, were women in disguise. Lady Corinthia, in contrast, believes that women should control men by using feminine glamour and charm. Giving votes to women will ensure that the ugly and dowdy ones will be as powerful as charming beauties such as herself, which is outrageous.

Mitchener is so shocked by the arguments of Mrs Banger and Lady Corinthia that he decides he is now in favour of votes for women. Mrs Banger says she will try to get Sandstone's support. After she leaves Balsquith reappears and says that the government is cracking. The Liberals and the Labour party have declared support for women's suffrage. Mitchener says he must now withdraw his support, since he cannot be seen to bow to pressure. The orderly returns with news that General Sandstone has been forced by Mrs Banger to allow women to join the army. Further, Mrs Banger's tactic of sitting on the general's head until he gives in has so impressed Sandstone that he's proposed marriage to her. Mitchener decides that he will marry the only sensible woman he knows, Mrs Farrell. Mrs Farrell only agrees after consulting her daughter, a variety performer who is engaged to the son of a Duke. Lady Corintha is left with Balsquith, but he insists that he does not wish to marry. She says that she too does not want marriage, which is far too vulgar. She must fulfil her destiny to be his "Egeria", or behind-the-scenes advisor. The orderly is promoted to the rank of lieutenant, as he is too incompetent to be a sergeant.

== Censorship ==
The Censor objected to the characters, and the play was banned on the ground that Shaw was satirising real individuals. The name of General Mitchener, Minister of War, closely mimics that of General Kitchener, with an additional possible allusion to Alfred Milner, 1st Viscount Milner. The Prime Minister's name "Balsquith" is a conflation of Balfour and Asquith. Arthur Balfour had been Prime Minister from 1902 to 1905. H. H. Asquith had become Prime Minister in 1908, and was in office at the time the play was written.

In 1926 Shaw gave a speech in which he said that "Mitchener" was based on Prince George, Duke of Cambridge, not Kitchener:

The most extraordinary adventure I have ever had with the Censor was with a play in which I wanted to call a General 'Mitchener'. This was objected to because the Censor thought I was alluding to Kitchener. As a matter of fact anybody who read the play could see that my character was not in the least like Kitchener's, and the reason I chose the name was because I wanted to throw the Censor right off the scent. I was really alluding to the late Duke of Cambridge.

Shaw's friend and biographer Archibald Henderson suggests that the Censor may well have recognised the real target: "Shaw's Balsquith (Balfour-Asquith) and Mitchener (Milner-Kitchener) bear not the faintest resemblance to any of the personages suggested by their names; but the Censor may have detected the old Duke of Cambridge, Queen Victoria's uncle, in the disguise of Mitchener."

The censorship of the play led to news reports in Europe. In Germany it was reported that the censorship was related to the anti-German comments attributed to the General. The German newspaper Berliner Morgenpost asked Shaw for the relevant passages from the play. He passed them to his regular German translator Siegfried Trebitsch. Trebitsch arranged for the translation to be published in the Berliner Tageblatt. Trebitsch later published a full translation of the play under the title Zeitungs ausschnitte.

== Productions ==
Shaw's supporters founded the Civic and Dramatic Guild to get around the ban, which applied only to public theatres, not to private productions for members of a club. The play was produced for the first time on 9 July 1909. The censor allowed the play to be performed publicly with names of the characters changed to Prime Minister "Johnson" and General "Bones". The first public performance was at the Gaiety Theatre, Manchester, on 27 September 1909.

Some productions were put on as part of the suffrage cause. The first public London production in 1910 by the Actresses' Franchise League in a double bill with Cicely Hamilton's play How the Vote was Won. A special performance was given by Oswald Yorke's Company in America in 1912, at a Woman's Suffrage Party benefit. A benefit performance was produced in Washington, D.C. by the Group Players of the Washington Drama League to raise money for the House of Play, the Drama League's children's theater.

There have been two radio adaptations of the play:

- 6 January 1971 on BBC Radio 4, adapted by Jack Willis and directed by David H. Godfrey, with Arthur Lowe as General Mitchener, Sheila Manahan as Mrs. Farrell, Gerald Cross as Mr. Balsquith, Joan Sanderson as Mrs. Banger and Sonia Fraser as Lady Fanshawe
- 8 December 1983 on BBC World Service, adapted and directed by Gordon House, with Nigel Stock as General Mitchener, Pauline DeLaney as Mrs. Farrell, Geoffrey Collins as Mr. Balsquith, Margaret Boyd as Mrs. Banger and Brenda Tey as Lady Fanshawe

== Shaw's view of suffragettes ==
Shaw was a long-standing supporter of female suffrage. The play was intended to help raise funds for the Women's Suffrage Society. The arguments of the anti-suffrage characters parody those of the Women's National Anti-Suffrage League.

Shaw's unwillingness to portray suffragettes may have arisen from his own strong disapproval of Emmeline Pankhurst's tactics. Pankhurst's Women's Social and Political Union was increasingly resorting to violence, generally against property. He wrote to one suffragette that the members of the movement should not be allowed to commit serious crimes just "because their motives are public motives". Many years later he said that the methods of the WSPU constituted "a grotesque campaign of feminine sabotage". Gareth Griffith argues that the play excludes suffragettes, because Shaw's own Socratic method of argument precludes drama of intimidation by violence,

Press Cuttings seems to say that the case for democracy for women becomes irresistible once the arguments against it (and the proponents of those arguments) are brought out into the open. By implication, it suggests, too, that the play could not have delivered its "rational" conclusion if it had brought a representative of the militant suffragettes on to the stage....To have brought a suffragette on to the stage would have been to plunge the play into an endless round of irrational disputation: that was not the stuff of Shavian drama.

Shaw's prediction in the play that violence would have escalated dramatically by 1912 was correct, albeit exaggerated for comic effect. 1912-13 proved to be the high point of suffragette violence, during which there was an attempt to burn down a theatre which Asquith was attending and there were several attempts to bomb the homes of prominent politicians, and even St Paul's Cathedral. A meeting of the Men's League for Women's Suffrage, to which Shaw belonged, was disrupted by Anti-Suffragists shouting "go home and make bombs" and "who put the bomb in St Paul's?"

== Critical views ==
Archibald Henderson says that, "In form, it is very like, though superior in characterization to, a Paris revue; Julius Bab has pronounced it vastly above the contemporary German Witzblatt....Press Cuttings on its appearance was hailed in the United States as the most amusing thing Shaw had written in many years." Henderson gives his own view,

Out of the situation arising from reversing the rôles of man and woman, due to the agitation of the "militant suffragettes"—woman developing all the "manly" qualities of pugnacity and overbearing insolence, man developing the "womanly" qualities of timidity and indecision—Shaw has extracted a comedy that is breezily, devastatingly comical. But, even in a topical sketch, Shaw from time to time "puts away childish things" and shows us the serious side of several subjects. Those who indulge in the futile claim that men are more useful to the world than women will find food for serious reflection in the passage in Shaw's play in which General Mitchener tries to excuse himself for giving way to profanity. He is sternly reproved by the Irish charwoman, Mrs. Farrell.

Critic Tracy C. Davis says that the play "differs markedly from suffrage plays written by women", even comparable ones with farcical elements such as Joan Dugdale's 10 Clowning Street. The play addresses parallel issues: "demands for female suffrage and the implementation of male conscription as well as civil rights (including enfranchisement) for the armed forces. Here a joke based on identity reversal sets off more profound proposals, though the play conforms to the typical pattern of the farcical genre, namely that an anti-suffrage advocate convinces a man to be pro-suffrage by her sheer extremism and illogic."
