= The First Night of Pygmalion =

1968 play by Richard Huggett

The First Night of Pygmalion is a play by Richard Huggett, first performed in 1968. It depicts backstage events during the first British production of George Bernard Shaw's play Pygmalion.

It depicts the backstage tensions between Shaw, Mrs Patrick Campbell who played Eliza Doolitle, and Herbert Beerbohm Tree who played Professor Higgins, including the controversy surrounding the line "not bloody likely". It is mainly based on letters, diaries and newspaper reports from the time.

The play has twice been adapted for British television (in 1969 and 1975).
