= Too True to Be Good =

Play by George Bernard Shaw (1931)

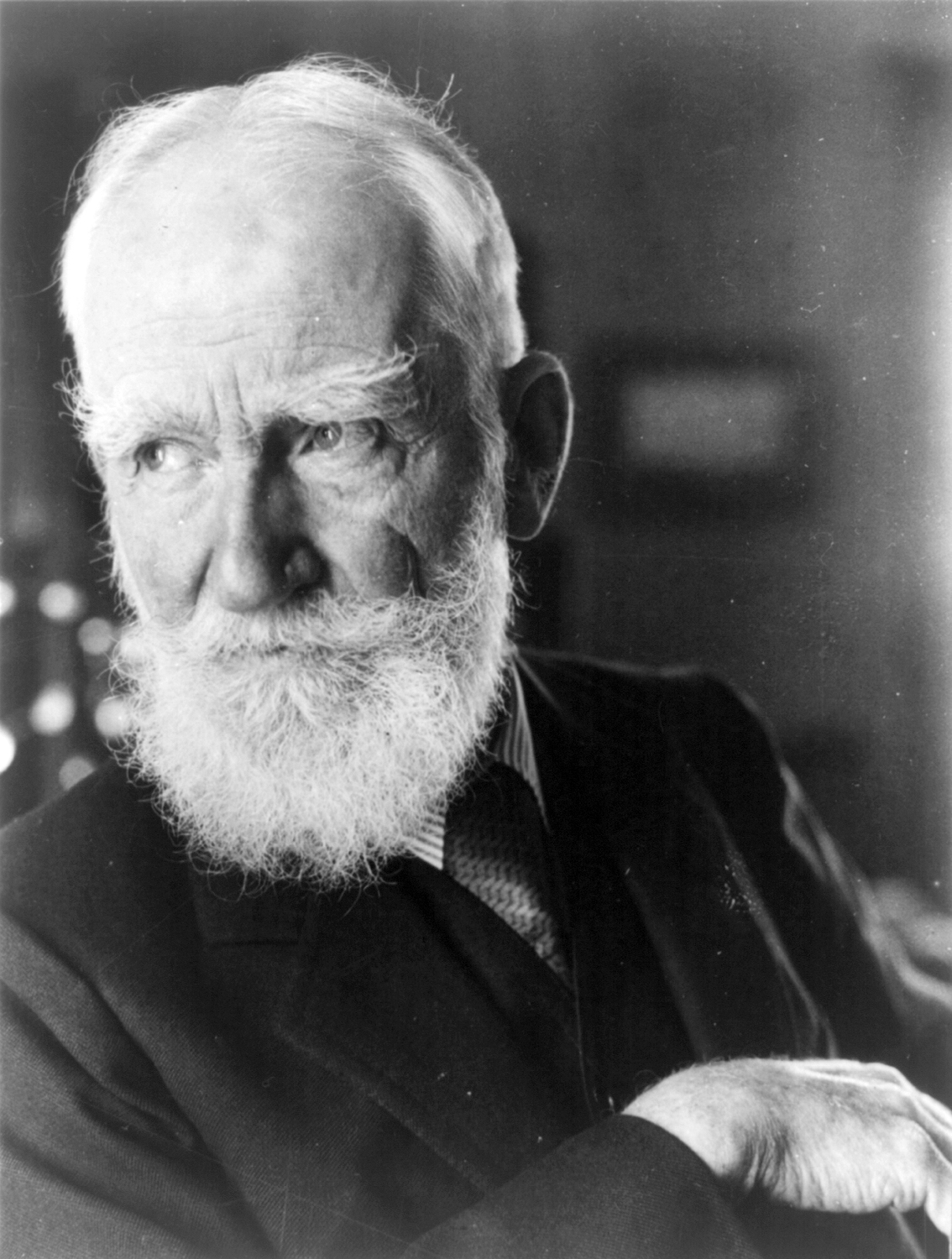
- George Bernard Shaw
- Original language: English
- Written by: George Bernard Shaw
- Subject: A sick woman escapes to an exotic land
- Genre: Comedy

Premiere
- Date: 29 February 1932
- Place: Colonial Theatre (Boston)

Too True to Be Good (1932) is a comedy written by playwright George Bernard Shaw at the age of 76. Subtitled "A Collection of Stage Sermons by a Fellow of the Royal Society of Literature", it moves from surreal allegory to the "stage sermons" in which characters discuss political, scientific and other developments of the day. The second act of the play contains a character based on Shaw's friend T. E. Lawrence.

== Characters ==
- The Microbe
- The Patient
- The Doctor
- Mrs Mopply
- Susan "Sweety" Simkins
- Aubrey "Popsy" Bagot
- Colonel Tallboys
- Private Napoleon Alexander Trotsky Meek
- Sergeant Fielding
- The Elder Bagot

== Plot ==
A talking Microbe complains that he is beginning to feel ill, since he has become infected by the sick Patient whom he himself infects. The Patient is the daughter of Mrs Mopply, whose children have been dying of the illness one by one. The Patient feels that her life is empty and pointless. When her nurse Susan and the nurse's boyfriend Aubrey are discovered attempting to steal the Patient's jewels, the Patient is delighted. She suggests that they should sell the jewels and pretend to kidnap her so that she can experience life away from her stifling home. The three leave. The Microbe tells the audience that the actual plot of the play is now over, and that the rest will just be a lot of talking.

The three escapees arrive at a fort in a jungle, at an outpost of the British Empire governed by Colonel Tallboys. Susan pretends to be a Countess, arriving with her brother and maid. They soon discover that the real ruler of the area is the seemingly diffident Private Napoleon Alexander Trotsky Meek. When rebellious natives attack the fort, the Colonel merely paints a watercolour, leaving Meek to confront them. The trio now find that they too are infected by boredom, as life in the wild tropics is as empty as it was back in Britain.

Mrs Mopply and Aubrey's father, The Elder, come to the fort looking for the missing trio. The characters engage in lengthy philosophical discussions about science, religion and politics. The Elder, an atheist, debates religion with Sergeant Fielding, a soldier undergoing a crisis of faith. After the Colonel hits Mrs Mopply on the head with an umbrella, she fails to recognise her own daughter. As a result, she and the Patient become friends for the first time and leave together. Left alone, Aubrey concludes that "we have outgrown our religion, outgrown our political system, outgrown our own strength of mind and character”.

== In performance ==
The play was first staged on Monday, 29 February 1932, at Boston's Colonial Theatre, by the Theatre Guild. The first New York performance was at the Guild Theatre, followed in the same year by a production in Malvern, Worcestershire starring Beatrice Lillie, Claude Rains, and Leo G. Carroll.

It received a Broadway revival in 1963, directed by Albert Marre and starring Robert Preston, Lillian Gish, David Wayne, Cedric Hardwicke, Cyril Ritchard, Glynis Johns, and Eileen Heckart. This production featured incidental music by Mitch Leigh, who would later work with Marre on Man of La Mancha. It was revived by the Royal Shakespeare Company at the Aldwych Theatre in 1975 with Judi Dench, Michael Williams, Anna Calder-Marshall and Ian McKellen.

It has also been presented at the Shaw Festival five times: in 1974, 1982, 1994, 2006, and 2022. See Shaw Festival production history.

== Critical views ==
The play explicitly deals with the existential crisis that hit Europe after the end of the First World War, especially the emergence of a "modernist" culture fuelled by uncertainties created by Freudian psychology and Einstein's new physics. The whole of the second and third acts of the play have often been interpreted as a dream of escape occurring in the mind of the feverish Patient (hence the Microbe's comment that the "real" action is over), and the Patient repeatedly says that what is happening is a dream.

The play is an early example of the formal experimentation with allegory and the absurd that become a feature of Shaw's later work, having much in common with the later play The Simpleton of the Unexpected Isles, which is also set in an obscure island at the edge of the British Empire. Its absurdist elements later led to its being viewed as a precursor to the work of Samuel Beckett and Harold Pinter.

The idea that microbes, specifically bacteria, are somehow made sick by human illnesses was a belief that Shaw repeatedly promoted, claiming that disease produces mutations in bacteria, misleading doctors into the belief that "germs" cause disease. The play dramatises his theory that life-energy itself cures illness.

== Meek and Lawrence ==
The character of Private Napoleon Meek was a fictionalised version of T. E. Lawrence, a friend of Shaw. Shaw had told Lawrence soon after they met that he intended to base a future play character on Lawrence. He had also edited Lawrence's book Seven Pillars of Wisdom. Meek is depicted as thoroughly conversant with the language and culture of the tribal people, unlike the Colonel. In a mirror of Lawrence's career he repeatedly enlists with the army, quitting whenever offered a promotion, hence the fact that he is only a private. Lawrence himself had once done so using the name "Shaw", after his friend.

Shaw showed Lawrence the draft of the play, allowing him the opportunity to make improvements. Lawrence attended a performance of the play's original Worcestershire run at the Malvern Festival, and reportedly signed autographs for patrons attending the show. Lawrence wrote to Walter Hudd, the actor who played Meek, to congratulate him on his performance, saying "I only wish nature had made me look half as smart and efficient as yourself".
