= Charles Macdona =

Irish actor-manager and impresario (1860-1946)

Charles Macdona was an actor-manager and impresario, closely associated with the plays of Bernard Shaw. He formed touring companies performing in Britain and overseas between the late 1890s and the Second World War.

== Life and career ==
Macdona was born in Dublin on 3 October 1860 and made his acting debut in April 1884 with the American actress Mary Anderson's "British Provincial" tour. In a 2023 study, Nelson Ritschel suggests that although Macdona probably learned much with Anderson, he may have learned more from the touring company’s manager, Michael Gunn, who was also the owner and manager of the Gaiety Theatre, Dublin. Gunn also worked with Richard D’Oyly Carte and managed some of Carte's tours of Gilbert and Sullivan. Macdona followed Gunn's example and by 1898 he was starring with his own company in a touring musical comedy, The New Mephisto. The theatrical newspaper The Era found him to be "a versatile as well as an amusing comedian".

He toured the provinces for many years, and played leading parts with Marie de Grey. For three years he toured with The Private Secretary and for several years played Henry Beauclerc in Diplomacy on tour. He began to specialise in presenting West End hits in medium-sized provincial cities and towns. After the success of Bernard Shaw's Fanny's First Play (1911), Macdona and his business partner Lionel Rignold secured the rights to present the piece in the smaller locations, while Lillah McCarthy and Harley Granville-Barker retained the touring rights for the big cities. This suited Shaw, who was eager to have his plays presented to a wider public, although he was more enthusiastic about Rignold's and Macdona's performances in the male leads than about that of Macdona's wife, Nellie Hodson, as Dora.

In 1914 Macdona secured the touring rights to present Shaw's new play, Pygmalion, in Britain's smaller cities and towns. As Shaw came to trust him more and more, Macdona was granted the touring rights to thirteen Shaw plays by the 1920s. When the company played a season in Paris – the first of several – in 1924 Macdona appointed Esmé Percy as its producer; Percy was familiar with French theatre, having studied at the Paris Conservatoire under Sarah Bernhardt. He remained with the company, as both producer and actor until it disbanded at the start of the Second World War.

Macdona's companies toured in Britain, Ireland, South Africa, India and the Far East, also on the Continent. He presented a repertory of Shaw plays at the Court Theatre in 1929–30. Many actors appeared with Macdona's companies, often at the beginning of their careers. Among the actresses in his productions were Elspeth Duxbury, Kathleen Robinson, Valerie Taylor and Margaret Webster; the men included Hugh Sinclair, Sebastian Smith, Francis L. Sullivan, Torin Thatcher and Cecil Trouncer. Towards the end of his career Macdona returned to acting in his company's productions playing Polonius in Hamlet and Mr Knox in Fanny's First Play.

Macdona died on 16 November 1946 at the age of 86. Announcing his death, several newspapers classed him as the doyen of actor-managers. A memorial service was held at the "actors' church", St Paul's Covent Garden, on 2 December 1946; Dame Sybil Thorndike, Sir Lewis Casson, Esmé Percy and Lyn Harding took part.

== Sources ==
- Holroyd, Michael (1997). Bernard Shaw: The One-Volume Definitive Edition. London: Chatto & Windus. ISBN 978-0-7011-6279-5.
- Parker, John, ed. (1947). Who's Who in the Theatre (tenth ed.). London: Sir Isaac Pitman and Sons. OCLC 225162446.
- Ritschel, Nelson O'Ceallaigh (2023). "Bernard Shaw and the Charles Macdona Partnership: Part 1". Shaw: The Journal of Bernard Shaw Studies: 142–160. (subscription required)
- Ritschel, Nelson O'Ceallaigh (2023). "Bernard Shaw and the Charles Macdona Partnership: Part 2". Shaw: The Journal of Bernard Shaw Studies: 178–205. (subscription required)
