= Richard Huggett (playwright) =

British playwright (1929–2000)

Richard Huggett (born 25 April 1929, London, England, died 15 April 2000 in Surrey, England) was an English actor, author, and playwright.

He best-known plays are The First Night of Pygmalion (1968) and A Talent To Abuse (1981), both originally written and performed by Huggett himself as one-man shows. The First Night of Pygmalion was later adapted for television in 1969 and again in 1975. A Talent to Abuse, in which Huggett played writer Evelyn Waugh, met with criticism from Waugh's son, Auberon. Huggett was also noted for his 1989 biography of British theatre producer Binkie Beaumont.

== Works ==
=== Plays ===
- The Lupin-Blue Dress (1965)
- Good Egg (1967)
- The First Night of "Pygmalion" (1968)
- A Talent To Abuse (1981)
- A Weekend with Willie (BBC radio broadcast, 1981)

=== Nonfiction ===
- The Truth About Pygmalion (1969)
- The Wit of the Catholics (1971)
- The Wit and Humour of Sex (1975)
- Supernatural on Stage: Ghosts and Superstitions of the Theatre (1975)
- The Curse of Macbeth (1981)
- The Wit of Publishing (1987)
- Binkie Beaumont – Éminence Grise of the West End Theatre, 1933–1973. (1989) ISBN 0340412690.
