= John Bull's Other Island =

Play written by George Bernard Shaw

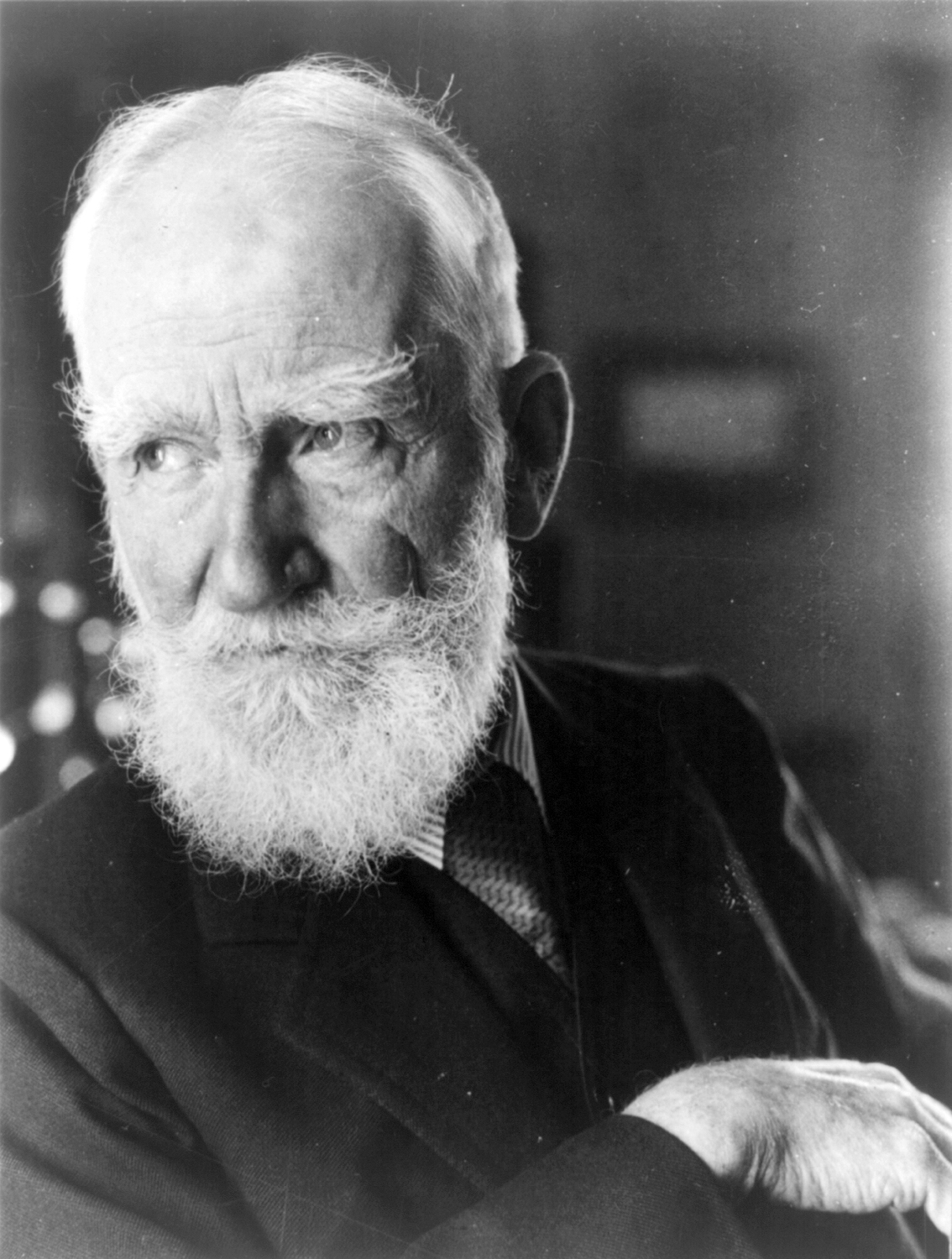
- Original language: English
- Written by: George Bernard Shaw
- Subject: An English businessman charms Irish villagers into mortgaging their homes
- Genre: satirical comedy
- Setting: A village in Ireland

Premiere
- Date: 1 November 1904
- Place: Royal Court Theatre

John Bull's Other Island is a comedy about Ireland, written by George Bernard Shaw in 1904. Shaw himself was born in Dublin, yet this is one of only two plays of his where he thematically returned to his homeland, the other being O'Flaherty V.C. The play was highly successful in its day, but is rarely revived, probably because so much of the dialogue is specific to the politics of the day.

== Characters and original cast ==
- Tom Broadbent – Louis Calvert
- Larry Doyle – J. L. Shine
- Tim Haffigan – Percival Stevens
- Hodson – Nigel Playfair
- Peter Keegan – Harley Granville Barker
- Patsey Farrell – Graham Browne
- Father Dempsey – Charles Daly
- Corney Doyle – F. Cremlin
- Barney Doran – Wilfred Shine
- Matthew Haffigan – A. E. George
- Aunt Judy – Agnes Thomas
- Nora Reilly – Ellen O'Malley

Source: The Times.

== Plot ==
The play deals with Larry Doyle, originally from Ireland, who has adopted English cultural customs and manners to find his place in England and Tom Broadbent, his English business partner. They are civil engineers who run a firm in London. They go to Roscullen, where Doyle was born, to develop some land.

Doyle has no illusions about Ireland while Broadbent is taken with the romance of the place. Broadbent, a lively man who is seemingly not always aware of the impression he makes, becomes a favourite of the people. Before the play is over, it is clear he will marry Nora Reilly, the woman waiting for Doyle (who is more than happy to let her go) and become the area's candidate for Parliament after Doyle refuses to stand. The syndicate for which Broadbent and Doyle work will foreclose on strategically unwise loans to the locals against their homes and make the village into a hotel and golf resort.

Another major character is the defrocked priest Peter (Father) Keegan, the political and temperamental opposite of Broadbent, who becomes suspicious of him upon his arrival and warns the locals against him.

== Productions ==
The play was commissioned by W. B. Yeats for the opening of Dublin's Abbey Theatre, but Yeats rejected it as too long and too difficult to produce. He claimed that no actors were available who could do justice to the part of Broadbent. Peter Kavanagh suggests that Yeats' real reason was dislike of Shaw's style of playwriting: "at this time Yeats and Synge did not feel that Shaw belonged to the real Irish tradition. His plays would thus have no place in the Irish theatre movement. John Bull's Other Island was a play about Ireland but not of it. Furthermore, Shaw's plays were mostly argument, and Yeats particularly detested this quality in dramatic writing." Shaw himself commented the play was written at the request of "Mr William Butler Yeats as a patriotic contribution to the Repertory of the Irish Literary Theatre. Like most people who have asked me to write plays Mr Yeats got rather more than he bargained for ... It was uncongenial to the whole spirit of the neo-Gaelic movement, which is bent on creating a new Ireland after its own ideal, whereas my play is a very uncompromising presentment of the real old Ireland."

The play premiered in London at the Royal Court Theatre on 1 November 1904, under the Vedrenne-Barker management. Due to its length, Barker, with Shaw's consent but not approval, cut the play somewhat. Dealing with the Irish question of the time, the play was attended by many major British political figures. A command performance was given for King Edward VII. He laughed so hard he broke his chair. This incident was widely reported and—after more than a decade of playwriting—Shaw's name was made in London. It was a great success and the Court would go on to produce many other Shaw plays, both old and new. In the words of T. F. Evans, "the age of Bernard Shaw may be said to have begun".

== Political contexts ==
As popular as the play was originally, it is not one of Shaw's more revived pieces. Liz Kennedy reviewing a revival in 2004, during the New Labour government of Tony Blair, argued that the play was still relevant: "Shaw's vision from one hundred years ago was a far-seeing one...The drama has especial contemporary resonance in this continued period of political vacuum on our own shores" She particularly praised "Alan Cox, giving an appropriately mannered Blairite performance as Broadbent the Englishman...he might historically be a Liberal, but he sounded very New Labour."
