= On the Rocks: A Political Comedy =

Play written by George Bernard Shaw

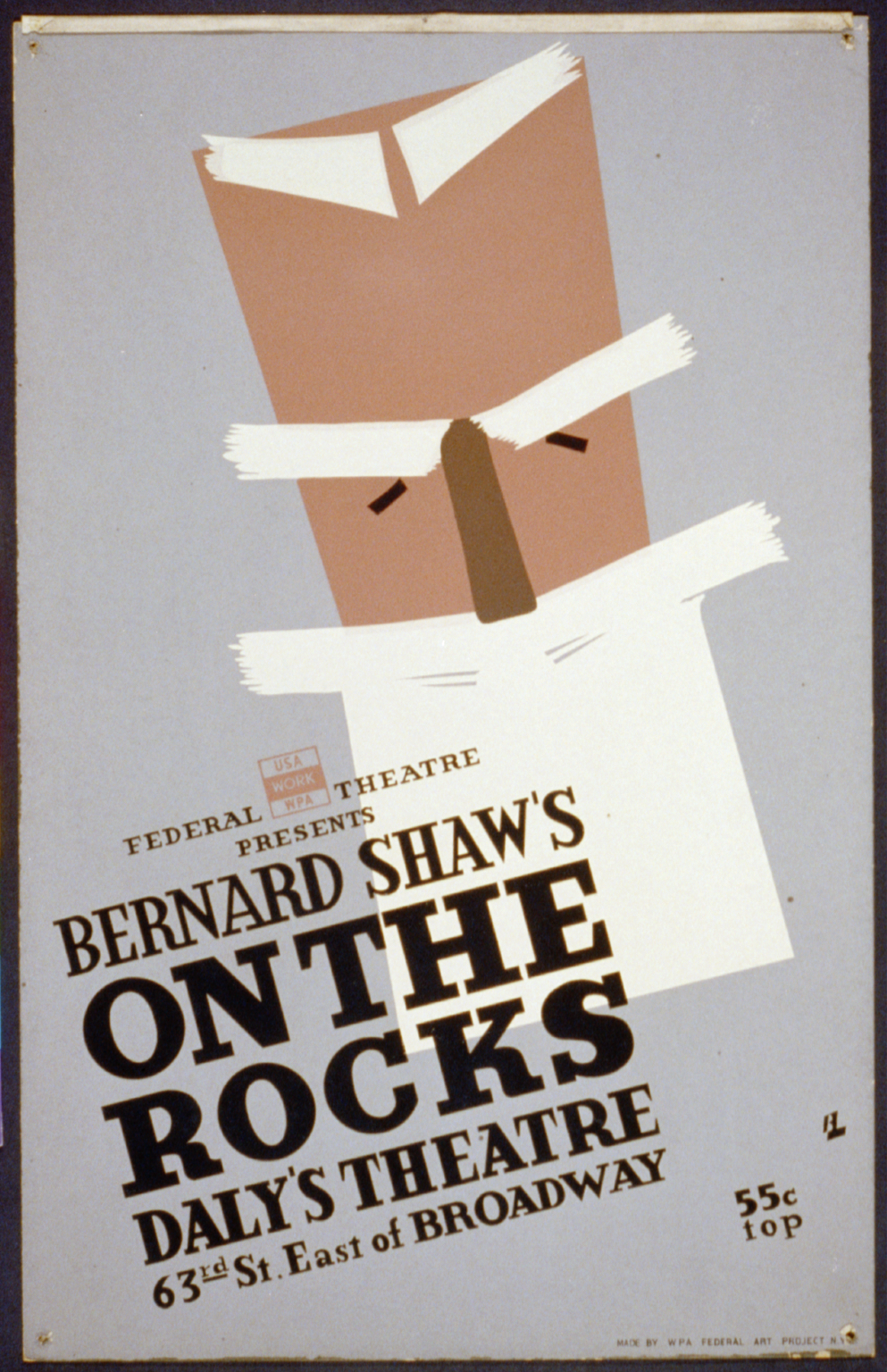
- Poster for a Federal Theatre production of the play
- Written by: George Bernard Shaw
- Original language: English
- Subject: characters discuss the breakdown of society
- Genre: political comedy
- Setting: The near future

Premiere
- Date premiered: 25 November 1933
- Place premiered: Winter Garden Theatre, London,

On the Rocks: A Political Comedy (1932) is a play by George Bernard Shaw which deals with the social crisis of the Great Depression. The entire play is set in the Cabinet Room of 10 Downing Street. It is noted for its evidence of Shaw's political evolution towards apparent support for dictatorship.

== Premiere ==
The play was first produced at the Winter Garden Theatre, London on 25 November 1933, with the following cast:

- Sir Arthur Chavender, Prime Minister – Nicholas Hannen
- Hilda Hanways – Phyllis Thomas
- Sir Broadfoot Basham, Chief Commissioner of Police – Walter Hudd
- Flavia Chavender – Marjorie Playfair
- Lady Chavender – Margaret Macdona
- David Chavender – Lewis Shaw
- Tom Humphries, Mayor of the Isle of Cats – Charles Sewell
- Alderwoman Aloysia Broillikins – Ellen Pollock
- Viscount Barking – Emerton Court
- Alderman Blee – George E. Bancroft
- Mr Hipney – Edward Rigby
- The Lady – Fay Davis
- Sir Dexter Rightside, Foreign Secretary – Charles Carson
- Admiral Sir Bemrose Hotspot, First Lord of the Admiralty – Matthew Boulton
- Mr Glenmorison, President of the Board of Trade – Norman MacOwan
- Sir Jafna Pandranath – Lewis Casson
- Duke of Domesday – Lawrence Hanray

The play was directed by Lewis Casson.

== Context ==
The play was written in the midst of the Depression, and shortly after Hitler had come to power in Germany. The figure of the Prime Minister recalls that of Ramsay MacDonald, who was running the National Government at the time it was written. Shaw had recently given a lecture entitled "In Praise of Guy Fawkes" in which he had spoken very positively of British Fascist leader Oswald Mosley. Beatrice Webb described it as a "painfully incoherent tirade" in which "he said nothing in particular except for the laudation of Oswald Mosley as the 'man of the future'". Webb later noted that Shaw's enthusiasm had abated after Mosley became associated more with Nazism than with Italian-style Fascism.

== Plot ==
In the near future Britain is descending into social chaos as a result of economic collapse. The Liberal Prime minister, Sir Arthur Chavender, is having to find a way to deal with the problem. A national government has not worked. In the Cabinet Room the Prime Minister meets various advisers, members of his family, a mysterious female doctor, and deputations from the people. Chavender is described as a typical politician, who "could be trusted to talk and say nothing, to thump the table and do nothing". When the deputation representing the unemployed arrives, Chavender suavely dismisses them with empty promises, but finds himself disturbed by the resentment of the more perceptive delegates. A conversation with his wife further weakens his self-confidence.

Chavender meets with Old Hipney, a veteran of the Labour movement. Hipney says that parliament has had its day. Decisive leadership is needed. A female doctor arrives and tells him that he will die of mental enervation unless he changes. Chavender has a radical change of heart. Inspired by Stalin, he proposes to introduce wholesale nationalisation of industry and compulsory public service. He meets with members of the Labour and Conservative parties, who initially approve his plan, as does Sir Jafna Pandranath, a Sri Lankan millionaire who represents the business interests of the British Empire. Soon, however, negotiations break down, and Chavender says that a dictatorship is the only answer to stop the ineffective chatter and competing interests of the various factions. Dexter Rightside, the Conservative leader, is horrified and promises to provoke a counter-revolution should any such thing happen. The Labour figures are also appalled that the independence of Trades Unions will be lost. Pandranath, however, is in favour of the scheme, declaring democracy to be dead. Hipney states that we need a new Napoleon. Chavender agrees that such a man might be needed, but that he would hate the man for the brutality of the regime he would have to introduce to make it work. The mob of the unemployed then break into the room, smashing windows and singing "England arise!".

== Politics ==
The politics of the play have been interpreted in various ways. Chavender appears to express distaste for dictatorship while also believing it will be necessary. At one point he says that people "are ready to go mad with enthusiasm for any man strong enough to make them do anything, even if it is only Jew baiting, provided it's something tyrannical, something coercive, something that we all pretend no Englishman would submit to". Margery Morgan argues that the Carlylean attacks on democracy articulated by Hipley define him as a Mephistophelian figure, trying to tempt Chavender, but that play presents the fascistic solution he proposes as unacceptable. Gareth Griffith, however, argues that "the play's message is not as obviously salutatory as Morgan suggests", since it contains "an underlying commitment to ruthlessness in public life".

=== Preface ===
That commitment was fully expressed in the preface to the play, which is far less ambiguous, and begins with an explicit affirmation of "killing as a political function", at least of "untameable persons who are constitutionally unable to restrain their violent or acquisitive impulses". He then discusses large-scale political "exterminations":

In Germany it is suggested that the Nordic race should exterminate the Latin race. As both these lingual stocks are hopelessly interbred by this time, such a sacrifice to ethnological sciolism is not practicable; but its discussion familiarizes the idea and clears the way for practicable suggestions. The extermination of whole races and classes has been not only advocated but actually attempted. The extirpation of the Jew as such figured for a few mad moments in the program of the Nazi party in Germany. The extermination of the peasant is in active progress in Russia, where the extermination of the class of ladies and gentlemen of so-called independent means has already been accomplished; and an attempt to exterminate the old Conservative professional class and the kulak or prosperous farmer class has been checked only by the discovery that they cannot as yet be done without. Outside Russia the extermination of Communists is widely advocated; and there is a movement in the British Empire and the United States for the extermination of Fascists.

Shaw says that there is nothing new in this, since the "extermination of what the exterminators call inferior races is as old as history." What is new is that modern politicians since the French revolution have created a social principle of extermination, whether it be of aristocrats as in the case of France, or Jews as in Germany. This is an outgrowth of class conflict, but in the future such decisions can be made scientifically.
