= Overruled (play) =

Play written by George Bernard Shaw

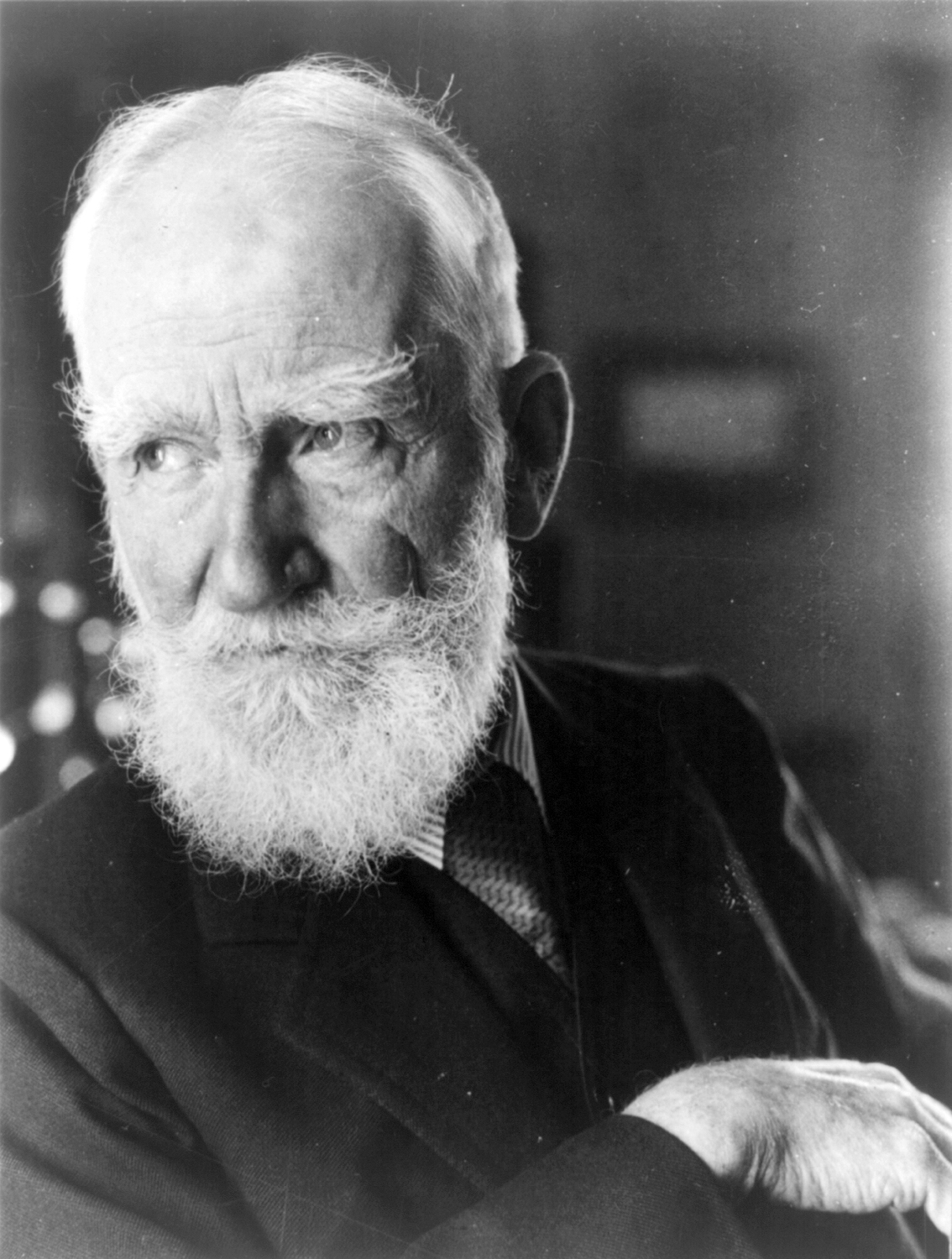
- Written by: George Bernard Shaw
- Original language: English
- Subject: Two couples want to switch partners
- Genre: comedy of manners
- Setting: A seaside hotel

Premiere
- Date premiered: 14 October 1912
- Place premiered: Duke of York's theatre

Overruled (1912) is a comic one-act play written by George Bernard Shaw. In Shaw's words, it is about "how polygamy occurs among quite ordinary people innocent of all unconventional views concerning it." The play concerns two couples who desire to switch partners, but are prevented from doing so by various considerations and end up negotiating an ambiguous set of relationships.

== Characters ==
- Gregory Lunn
- Mrs. Lunn
- Sibthorpe Juno
- Mrs. Juno

== Plot ==
Gregory Lunn and Mrs Juno are in love, having met during a sea voyage. On a sofa in a hotel where both are staying, they discuss their feelings. They are both already married, so they decide they must part, but are unable to do so. They then recognise the voices of their respective spouses, apparently staying together at the same hotel. They leave in confusion. Mrs Lunn and Mr. Sibthorpe Juno enter and sit together on the same sofa that the other pair have just left. Sibthorpe says he is in love with Mrs Lunn, but she says she is only mildly attracted to him. Sibthorpe wants her to either accept or reject him outright. Her willingness to merely have an affair disturbs him. Gregory and Mrs. Juno re-enter and both couples reveal their conflicting feelings. They all find they have different views about the situation. Gregory feels that there is a morally unacceptable contradiction between his desires and his honour. Sibthorpe, in contrast, says that such mixed feelings are fine, as long as one acts according to moral principles. Mrs Lunn believes that moral rules are silly. She thinks that as long as everyone gets the best they can out of the situation, that is all that matters. She is quite happy for Mrs Juno to have her husband for a while, and to return the compliment by enjoying her affair with Sibthorpe. Sibthorpe says that this is justifying polygamy. Mrs Lunn says she intends to continue the affair with Sibthorpe, because she enjoys it. Mrs Juno likewise refuses to stop seeing Gregory, because she enjoys being adored by him. So they agree to leave things as they are.

== Production ==
The play was first produced at the Duke of York's theatre on 14 October 1912, as part of an evening with other short plays by J. M. Barrie and Arthur Wing Pinero. The four characters were played by Claude King, Adolphus Vane-Tempest, Miriam Lewes and Geraldine Olliffe.

== Critical views ==
Shaw's friend Archibald Henderson, noted that the play was not well received at the time. Henderson also thought it a poor work: "The conversations are forced and unnatural: people do not say such things in real life. The situations are mechanical; and critics 'abused' the play, to Shaw's unrestrained disgust."
