= The Doctor's Dilemma (play) =

1906 play by George Bernard Shaw

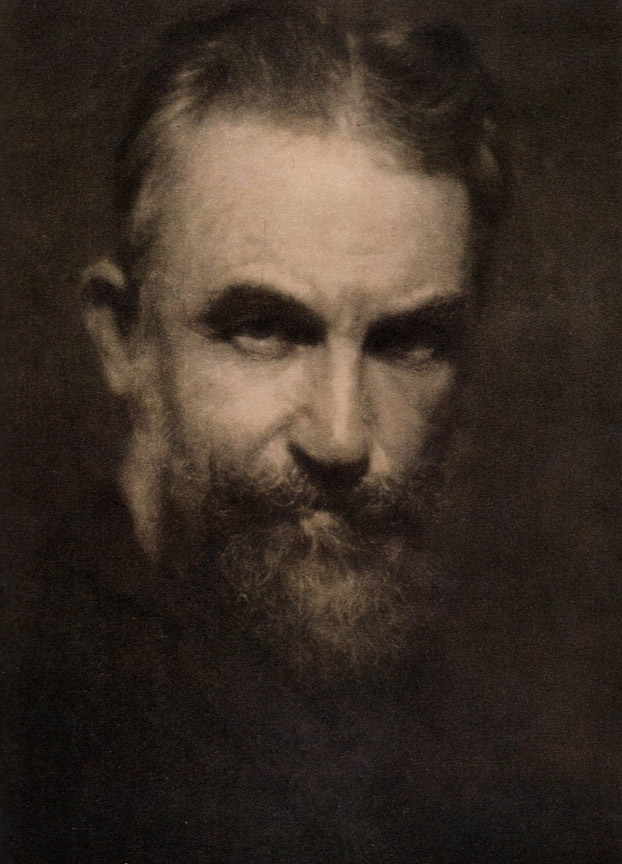
- Original language: English
- Written by: George Bernard Shaw
- Subject: A doctor must decide who will receive scarce life-saving treatment
- Genre: problem play
- Setting: A doctor's consulting room; an artist's studio

Premiere
- Date: 20 November 1906
- Place: Royal Court Theatre, London

The Doctor's Dilemma is a play by George Bernard Shaw first staged in 1906. It was published in 1909. It is a problem play about the moral dilemmas created by limited medical resources, and the conflicts between the demands of private medicine as a business and a vocation.

In the play, a medical doctor has developed a new cure for tuberculosis. Due to his limited staff and resources, he can only treat ten patients at a time. He reluctantly decides to treat an additional patient, but he has to choose between treating an altruistic medical colleague, or an extremely gifted artist with amoral beliefs. The doctor's decision is complicated because he is in love with the artist's wife, and he is tempted to let the patient die in order to court his widow.

== Characters ==
Roles and original cast:

- Mr. Danby – Lewis Casson
- Sir Patrick Cullen – William Farren, Junr.
- Louis Dubedat – Harley Granville-Barker
- Emmy – Claire Greet
- Dr. Blenkinsop – Edmund Gurney
- Minnie Tinwell – Mary Hamilton
- Cutler Walpole – James Hearn
- Sir Ralph Bloomfield Bonington – Eric Lewis
- The Newspaper Man – Trevor Lowe
- A Waiter – Percy Marmont
- Jennifer Dubedat – Lillah McCarthy
- Redpenny – Norman Page
- Leo Schutzmacher – Michael Sherbrooke
- Sir Colenso Ridgeon – Ben Webster

THE DOCTOR'S DILEMMA
ROYAL COURT THEATRE PROGRAMME
"Commencing Monday December 31st, 1906 for Six Weeks Only"
The Newspaper Man is played by Mr Jules Shaw, according to this programme.

== Synopsis ==
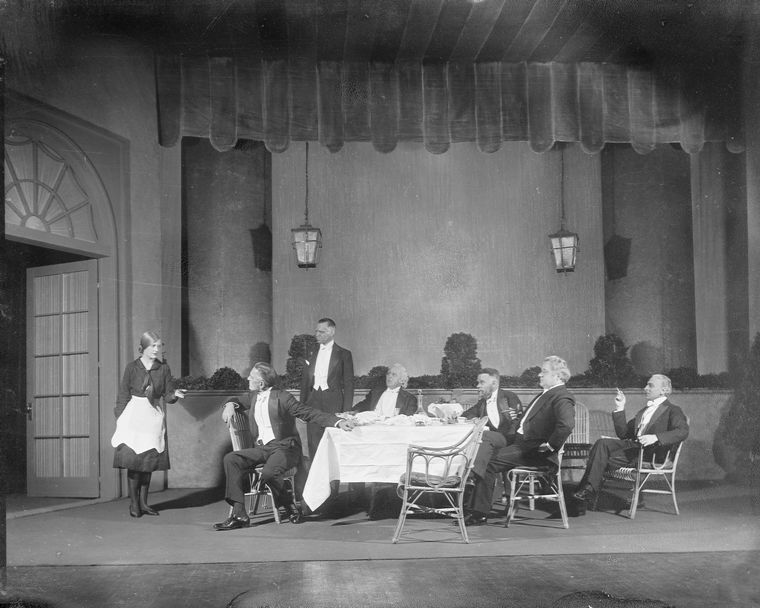
Photograph of scene designed by Jo Mielziner for George Bernard Shaw's Doctor's Dilemma, 1927

The eponymous dilemma of the play is that of the newly knighted doctor Sir Colenso Ridgeon, who has developed a revolutionary new cure for tuberculosis. However, his private medical practice, having limited staff and resources, can only treat ten patients at a time. From a group of fifty patients he has selected ten he believes he can cure and who, he believes, are most worthy of being saved. However, when he is approached by a young woman, Jennifer Dubedat, with a deathly ill husband, Louis Dubedat, he admits that he can, at a stretch, save one more patient, but he insists that the individual in question must be shown to be most worthy of being saved. The situation then becomes complicated, as an old friend and colleague reveals, he too, needs treatment. Sir Colenso must choose which patient he will save: a kindly, altruistic, poor medical colleague, or a young artist who is extremely gifted, but an amoral, very unpleasant womaniser and bigamist. Sir Colenso has also fallen in love with the young and vivacious Jennifer Dubedat, which makes it even harder for him to be clear about his motives for choosing who shall live.

In the end, the doctor decides to treat his colleague, deceiving Louis and Jennifer by telling them that another doctor will treat him. Before Louis dies, he persuades his wife to promise that she will remarry. Sir Colenso convinces himself that she will marry him. But when she learns of his wish, she is horrified: she cannot imagine wanting to marrying someone as old as he is. At that point, Sir Colenso confesses to her that he had selected his colleague over Louis partly because he is infatuated with her. Jennifer’s disgust upon learning this makes Sir Colenso question his decision.

== Preface ==
The Preface to the play – typically, as long as the drama itself – is an extensive tirade against the professions, and in particular the medical profession, as being excessively given to protestations of the public good and the actual pursuit of private interest. As a founding member of the Fabian movement in 1884, Shaw – a school drop-out who had used the British Library to achieve a massive self-education programme in his 20s and was active in local politics in the deprived London area of St Pancras – was a passionate critic of the huge disparities between the wealthy and the poor, and his unique combination of prodigious intellect and panoramic knowledge meant that he was seldom intimidated in his mission for fairness and truth (a substantial part of the Preface, however, is given over to a glittering harangue against vivisection). At the time of this play he was a highly successful dramatist, with works such as Man and Superman and Major Barbara enjoying international acclaim. The Doctor's Dilemma would come to be seen as the greatest satire on the medical profession since Molière's Malade Imaginaire.

Shaw credits Almroth Wright as the source of his information on medical science: "It will be evident to all experts that my play could not have been written but for the work done by Sir Alm[r]oth Wright on the theory and practice of securing immunization from bacterial diseases by the inoculation of vaccines made of their own bacteria." This remark is characteristically ironical. Wright was knighted shortly before this play was written, and Shaw was suspicious of Wright's high reputation (the latter was also known by the nickname Sir Almost Right). The two men met in 1905, and engaged in a long series of robust discussions, involving at one point a challenge from the medical audience that they had "too many patients on our hands already". Shaw's response was to ask what would be done if there was more demand from patients than could be satisfied, and Wright answered: "We should have to consider which life was worth saving." This became the "dilemma" of the play.

The preface mentions that there is another dilemma: poor doctors are easily tempted to perform costly but useless (and in the best case harmless) operations or treatments on their patients for personal gain. "Could I not make a better use of a pocketful of guineas than this man is making of his leg?" This was reportedly inspired by the behaviour of a prominent Ear Nose and Throat specialist in London who had developed a simple and almost harmless operation to remove the uvula, which did no benefit to his patients but made the surgeon a great deal of money.

== Significance ==
The play also mentions (then) new developments in the germ theory of disease, namely opsonins, and included socialist and anti-vivisectionist viewpoints.

The theme of the play remains current: in any time, there will be treatments that are so scarce or costly that some people can have them while others cannot. Who is to decide, and on which grounds is the decision to be taken?

It is sometimes claimed that an unexpected side-effect of the play's success was to greatly increase the popularity of the first name "Jennifer" (the name of the main female protagonist) in the English-speaking world. However, UK government statistics (covering England and Wales) only show the name 'Jennifer' first entering the top 100 most commonly used names for baby girls in 1934—a full 28 years after the play was first staged. Similarly, the name did not enter the top 1,000 names for newborn US girls until 1938.

== Production information ==
The Doctor's Dilemma was first produced on 20 November 1906 at the Royal Court Theatre.

Actress Katharine Cornell produced the play on Broadway in 1941, starring herself and Raymond Massey.

In 1942 Binkie Beaumont produced the play as a vehicle for Vivien Leigh. After a 6 month provincial tour it opened in London's West End at the Haymarket where it ran for over a year.

A film adaptation of the play, with the same title, was made in 1958, directed by Anthony Asquith, starring Leslie Caron and Dirk Bogarde.

The play’s most recent high-profile revival (2012) was on the Lyttelton stage at the National Theatre in London. The production was directed by Nadia Fall, with Aden Gillett playing the eponymous doctor, Genevieve O'Reilly as Jennifer Dubedat, and Tom Burke as Louis Dubedat. The production received middling reviews.
