= The Millionairess =

1960 British romantic comedy film by Anthony Asquith

- original film poster
- Directed by: Anthony Asquith
- Written by: Riccardo Aragno; Wolf Mankowitz
- Based on: The Millionairess; 1936 play by George Bernard Shaw
- Produced by: Dimitri De Grunwald; Pierre Rouve
- Starring: Sophia Loren; Peter Sellers; Alastair Sim; Dennis Price; Gary Raymond; Vittorio De Sica
- Cinematography: Jack Hildyard
- Edited by: Anthony Harvey
- Music by: Georges Van Parys
- Distributed by: 20th Century Fox
- Release date: 18 October 1960
- Running time: 90 minutes
- Country: United Kingdom
- Language: English
- Box office: $2.9 million (US/Canada Rentals)

The Millionairess is a 1960 British romantic comedy film directed by Anthony Asquith, and starring Sophia Loren and Peter Sellers. Set in London, it was adapted by Riccardo Aragno and Wolf Mankowitz from George Bernard Shaw's 1936 play of the same name.

== Plot ==
By the terms of her late father's will, spoiled London heiress Epifania Ognissanti di Parerga, the richest woman in the world, cannot marry unless her prospective husband is able to turn £500 into £15,000 within a three-month period. When Epifania becomes smitten with Alastair, a muscular tennis player, she rigs the contest by giving him £500 in stock and then buying it back for £15,000. Alastair is unable to live peacefully with the domineering Epifania, however, and is carrying on with the more domestic Polly Smith.

Contemplating suicide, Epifania melodramatically plunges into the Thames, and when Dr. Ahmed el Kabir, a self-effacing, selfless Indian physician who runs an inadequately equipped clinic for the poor, ignores her plight and paddles past in his rowboat, she swims to shore and accuses him of being an assassin. Julius Sagamore, the shrewd family solicitor, then suggests that Epifania undergo therapy with noted society psychiatrist Adrian Bland. The opportunist Bland makes a bid for her hand, but after he criticises her father, Epifania throws him into the Thames, and when Kabir rows out to help Bland, Epifania jumps in the river after him. Kabir takes her to a fishmonger's place to dry off. Attempting to ensnare him, Epifania feigns injury; the dedicated doctor remains impervious to her charms, indifferent to her wealth, even as they experience a definite 'connection' when he takes her wrist.

Determined to win the doctor, Epifania buys the property surrounding his clinic and then erects a new, modern facility. After Kabir rejects Epifania's offer to run the facility, she suggests that they marry instead. Intimidated by the headstrong heiress, Kabir manufactures a deathbed promise that he made to his mother, pledging that he would not marry unless his prospective bride can take 35 shillings and earn her own living for three months. Undaunted, Epifania accepts his challenge and then discloses the details of her father's will and hands him £500. When Kabir protests that he has no head for money, Epifania—knowing she will be able to again rig the situation—plops down the wad of bills and leaves.

Setting out to prove her worth, Epifania takes 35 shillings and heads for a sweatshop pasta factory. There, she threatens to expose the labour violations unless Joe, the proprietor, allows her to manage the plant. Three months later, Epifania has installed labour-saving machines, thus boosting productivity and making the plant a big success. Kabir, meanwhile, has tried in vain to give away his £500. After Kabir becomes drunk at a scientific dinner hosted by a wealthy doctor, he finds a sympathetic ear in his former professor and mentor, who offers to accept his money. At the clinic, Kabir eagerly turns over the cash to the professor. Soon after the professor leaves, Epifania appears and informs Kabir that she has met his mother's challenge. When he replies that he has failed and given all the money away, Epifania is deeply offended. Deciding to turn her back on the world of men, she announces that she plans to fire her board of directors, disband her empire and retire to a Tibetan monastery once she has evicted all the monks.

Desperate to keep his job, Sagamore realises that Kabir is responsible for Epifania's erratic behaviour and goes to see the doctor. At the clinic, Sagamore tells Kabir that Epifania has vowed to withdraw from the world at the stroke of midnight. Concerned that this means she is seriously considering suicide, Kabir hurries to the reception where Epifania is to bid farewell to her previous existence. Certain that their marriage is now imminent, Sagamore meets the terms of the will by purchasing Kabir's medical papers for £15,000. After Kabir rushes to Epifania, they kiss and he finally expresses his love.

== Cast ==
- Sophia Loren as Epifania Parerga
- Peter Sellers as Dr. Ahmed el Kabir
- Alastair Sim as Julius Sagamore
- Vittorio De Sica as Joe
- Dennis Price as Dr. Adrian Bland
- Gary Raymond as Alastair Fitzfassenden
- Alfie Bass as fish curer
- Miriam Karlin as Mrs. Joe
- Noel Purcell as Professor Merton
- Virginia Vernon as Polly
- Graham Stark as butler
- Diana Coupland as nurse
- Pauline Jameson as Muriel Pilkington
- Eleanor Summerfield as Mrs. Willoughby
- Willoughby Goddard as president
- Basil Hoskins as 1st secretary
- Gordon Sterne as 2nd secretary
- Tempe Adam as Gloria
- Wally Patch as Tubby Isaacs, whelk seller
- Charles Hill as Corelli
- Peter Sallis as unknown
- Ray Austin as stunt double for Dennis Price

== Reception ==
=== Box office ===
The film was one of the most popular movies at the British box office in 1960. It also made "a fortune" in 1961.

In the United States and Canada, the film's rentals achieved $2.9 million.

=== Critical ===
The Monthly Film Bulletin wrote: "Though it has sometimes been difficult in the past to respond wholeheartedly to Anthony Asquith's more academic choices of subject, his technical skill has never really been in question. The flatness, the slapdash craftsmanship, above all the sheer vulgarity, of The Millionairess is consequently all the more baffling. Not content to treat Shaw's play for what it is, an outmoded, rambling, but still intermittently diverting social fantasy on the one hand, a foolproof actress's vehicle on the other, Asquith has attempted to give new life to the story by peppering it with trick devices (prolonged super-impositions and painful bouts of frenzied crosscutting) and either extravagantly dressing or persistently undressing his leading actress. The result, lacking any sort of dramatic cohesion or continuity and seemingly planned less as a film than as a series of haphazard effects, is merely tiring."

Variety wrote: "Primarily, this stylized pic has Sophia Loren at her most radiant, wearing a series of stunning Balmain gowns. Shaw's Shavianisms on morality, riches and human relationship retain much of thelr edge, though nudged into a practlcal screenplay by Wolf Mankowitz. Anthony Asquith's direction often is slow, but he breaks up the pic with enough hilarious situation to keep the fim from getting tedious. A major fault Is that the cutting of a film, which is mainly episodic, is often needlessly jerky and indecisive."

In The Radio Times Guide to Films, Dick Fiddy gave the film 3/5 stars, writing: "Sellers brings a gentle charm to his character and avoids taking the easy route to laughter by racial caricature. Loren is stunning and excels at the light comedy."

Leslie Halliwell wrote "Messy travesty of a Shavian comedy that was never more than a star vehicle to begin with. Hardly any of it works despite the star cast, who are mostly miscast."

== Hit song ==
George Martin, who was the producer at that time of Peter Sellers' comedy recordings, conceived and instigated the writing and recording of a comedy duet "Goodness Gracious Me", sung by Sellers and Loren in their film characters. Martin commissioned David Lee and Herbert Kretzmer to write the song. Martin himself produced the recording. Martin envisioned the song as a recording to be incorporated in the soundtrack of the film. The film's producers did not agree to this, but the studio was happy to see the song released as a stand-alone single to promote the film. The song became a UK chart hit in 1960.
