= Getting Married (play) =

1908 G.B. Shaw stage play

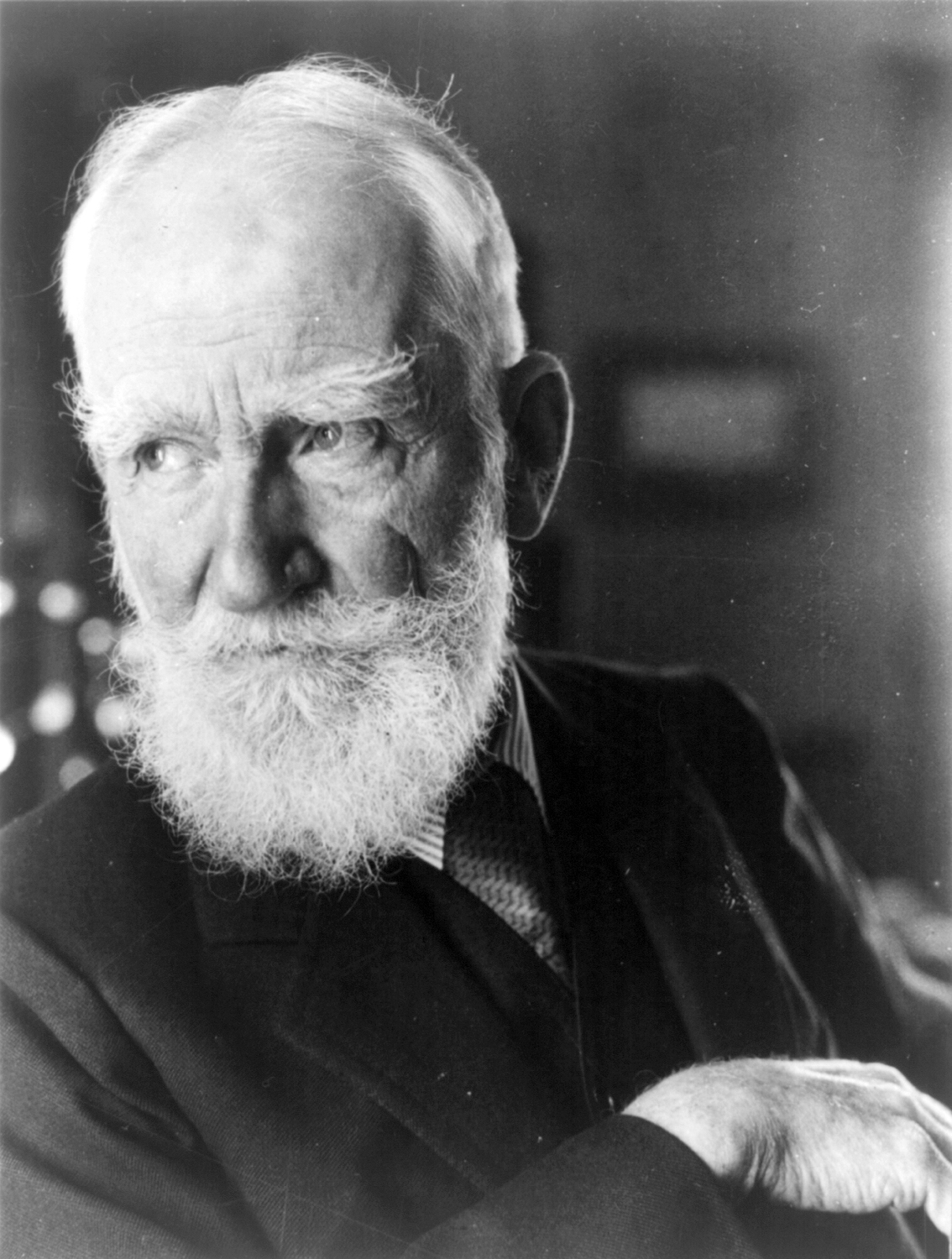
- George Bernard Shaw
- Original language: English
- Written by: George Bernard Shaw
- Subject: Various couples have very different views about marriage
- Genre: Comedy of manners
- Setting: "The Norman kitchen of the Bishop of Chelsea"

Premiere
- Date: 12 May 1908
- Place: Haymarket Theatre, London

Getting Married is a play by George Bernard Shaw. First performed in 1908, it features a cast of family members who gather together for a marriage. The play analyses and satirises the status of marriage in Shaw's day, with a particular focus on the necessity of liberalising divorce laws.

== Characters ==
- Mrs Bridgenorth
- Alderman Collins
- General Bridgenorth
- Lesbia Grantham
- Reginald Bridgenorth
- Mrs Reginald "Leo" Bridgenorth
- Bishop of Chelsea
- St John Hotchkiss
- Cecil Sykes
- Edith Bridgenorth
- Father Anthony Soames
- Mrs George Collins

== Plot ==
1908: Edith, youngest daughter of Bishop Bridgenorth, is about to be married. Her uncle General Boxer Bridgenorth, will give her away, as he has all her sisters. As at all the other weddings he proposes to Lesbia Grantham, the bride's aunt, who refuses him for the "tenth and last" time. Lesbia wants a family, but not a husband who smokes and is as untidy as the general. The General is soon shocked to find that his disreputable brother Reginald will be at the wedding. Reginald was recently divorced by his wife for assaulting her and for his adultery with a prostitute. Even more distressingly, his ex-wife Leo is coming too. When the divorcees arrive they are not at all embarrassed. It seems that Leo and her ex-husband arranged the "assault" and the "prostitute" so that they could separate without any blame attaching to Leo, who wishes to marry another man - St John Hotchkiss.

However problems arise when the bride refuses to leave her room. She says she is reading a pamphlet on marriage! Apparently Cecil Sykes, her husband-to-be, is also reading a pamphlet. Both refuse to go to the church until they are finished. The couple finally emerge from their rooms. It seems that the pamphlets have revealed to them the dangers of marriage. She has learned that if her husband becomes a criminal lunatic she cannot divorce him. He has learned that he may be liable for his wife's debts. The bishop, who is writing a book on the history of marriage, suggests that Edith and Cecil should revive the Roman concept of marriage by contract, but he thinks a traditional marriage is better. The Bishop's chaplain, a lawyer, tries to draw up a contract, though it proves a difficult task. All the characters have ideas about what should be in the contract, based on their own experience. There is disagreement on medical, religious, financial and other matters.

Eventually they give up, agreeing that a standard marriage is easier, at least with the possibility of divorce. Cecil and Edith leave together and return married - though the ceremony involved the Beadle giving away the bride. They have arranged with an insurance company a deal that will free Cecil of responsibility for any future debt incurred by his wife. In return Cecil has provided a document declaring that if he commits a crime while insane, his wife may divorce him. Hotchkiss, who, it turns out was being pursued by Leo rather against his own wishes, falls in love with the siren-like Mrs George Collins. Leo therefore tells her ex-husband that their divorce must be revoked.

== Preface ==
The preface to the published version of Getting Married is essentially a discussion of the future of marriage. Shaw takes the view that "Marriage remains practically inevitable", as the alternatives have too many disadvantages. In a future society, he argued, there could be no practicable replacement for marriage, neither individually negotiated deals or unconstrained "free love". Despite this, there was "a very pressing question of improving its conditions". Shaw went on to argue for sensible divorce laws that would protect the welfare of adults and children.

Shaw stated that the form of the play adopts the classical unities, saying "the Greek form is inevitable when drama reaches a certain point in poetic and intellectual evolution."

== Performance history ==
The cast of the premiere, at His Majesty's Theatre, London, in 1908, featured Marie Lohr and Henry Ainley. Subsequent productions have included those in Stratford-upon Avon in 1922, with Robert Newton and Gwen Frangcon-Davies; in Bristol in 1954-1955, with Annette Crosbie; in Birmingham in 1962, with Derek Jacobi; and in Croydon in 1982, with Judy Geeson, Barbara Leigh-Hunt and Frank Middlemass. The play's premiere on Broadway, in 1916, featured Henrietta Crosman. Broadway revivals were mounted in 1931, with Dorothy Gish; 1951, with Arthur Treacher and Peggy Wood; and 1991, with Elizabeth Franz and Simon Jones.

== Critical views ==
The play is generally considered to be one of Shaw's slighter works. Louis Crompton says that "Getting Married is hardly more than an animated tract". Homer E. Woodbridge says, "It has only small bits of action, and these are divided among three groups of people who are very loosely related. But the subtitle and the comment call attention to the two distinctive peculiarities in the form of the play: it is primarily a discussion, and it consists of only one interminable scene."
