= John Huxley Buzzard =

English barrister and judge (1912–1984)

HHJ John Huxley Buzzard
- Born: 12 August 1912
- Died: 28 January 1984 (aged 71)
- Education: New College, Oxford
- Occupations: Barrister, judge, legal scholar
- Known for: Criminal law
- Notable work: Archbold Criminal Pleading, Evidence and Practice; Phipson on Evidence
- Military career
- Allegiance: United Kingdom
- Branch: Royal Air Force
- Conflicts: World War II

John Huxley Buzzard (12 August 1912 – 28 January 1984) was an English barrister and judge, mountaineer, and author of legal works. He served with distinction during the Second World War and was widely respected in both legal and climbing circles for his professional skill and personal character.

== Early life and education ==
Buzzard was born on 12 August 1912. His father was Brigadier-General Frank Anstie Buzzard and his mother was Joan Collier, who was a member of the Huxley family. His maternal grandfather was the painter John Collier. He had a brother, Richard Bethune Buzzard, and a sister, Pamela Lois Buzzard.

He was educated at Wellington College and was elected an Open Classical Scholar of New College, Oxford in 1931, graduating B.A. in 1934 (with M.A. proceeding later by seniority).

Buzzard was commissioned into the 4th Queen’s Own Royal West Kent Regiment (Territorial) in 1931, and he transferred to the Territorial Army Reserve of Officers in 1935.

He was admitted as a member of the Inner Temple in January 1934 and called to the bar on 26 January 1937.

== Career ==
Buzzard joined the South-Eastern Circuit and practised mainly in criminal law from chambers in the Temple.

During the Second World War he served with the Royal Air Force Volunteer Reserve in the UK, Iceland, and South East Asia. The London Gazette records that he was granted a commission “for the duration of hostilities” as a Pilot Officer on probation, effective from 14 May 1940. By late 1944 or early 1945 he appeared in the Gazette in a list headed “Acting Squadron Leaders”. An Alpine Club obituary records that he worked in Air Ministry Intelligence, ultimately reaching the rank of Wing Commander. He was mentioned in despatches.

Buzzard returned to the bar after 1945, focusing on criminal cases. He progressed through the ranks of Treasury Counsel and was Second and then First Senior Prosecuting Counsel to the Crown at the Central Criminal Court (1964–71 and 1971–74).

From 1958 he held a series of part-time judicial appointments: as the Recorder of Great Yarmouth (1958–68), the Recorder of Dover (1968–71), and a Recorder of the Crown Court (1971–74).

In 1974 Buzzard was appointed as a Circuit Judge at the Central Criminal Court. Just days after his appointment, he was the target of a letter bomb attack. On 30 January 1974 a device was sent to his Surrey home and it exploded in his hands, blowing off part of two fingers. Despite this injury, Buzzard continued to sit on the bench. This incident earned him a reputation for magnanimity and compassion in court, as noted by contemporaries.

Buzzard served as consultant editor for the 39th to 42nd editions of Archbold Criminal Pleading, Evidence and Practice, variously with S. G. Mitchell, T. R. F. Butler, P. J. Richardson, and D. A. Thomas.

He also co-edited the 11th to 13th editions of Phipson on Evidence (1970, 1976, 1982) together with Mitchell and others.

Buzzard was elected a bencher of the Inner Temple in 1965.

Buzzard's obituary in The Times records that Sir James Miskin, the Recorder of London, spoke of his work as an editor and advocate: “He knew the answer to every legal problem and had practised from magistrates' courts to the House of Lords.”

== Personal life ==
Buzzard was an enthusiastic mountaineer. Before the war he made numerous guided climbs in the Engelberg area of Switzerland, and while stationed in South Asia during the war, he served as a climbing instructor at the RAF’s Aircrew Mountain Centre in Kashmir. In 1944 he joined an expedition attempting the peak Nanda Ghunti in Garhwal, and in 1945 he climbed several peaks above Sonamarg in Kashmir. He was elected to the Alpine Club in 1946 and also became a member of the Himalayan Club and the Climbers' Club.

After the war, he married Hilary Ann Courtney (née Antrobus) Buzzard in 1946, and they settled into family life in the English countryside. Their children are Christopher, Thomas, and Jane. Buzzard largely gave up high-risk climbing after marriage.

== Death ==
Buzzard died in 1984; he was survived by his wife and three children.
