= Tilly of Bloomsbury =

Tilly of Bloomsbury may refer to:

- Tilly of Bloomsbury (play), a 1919 play by Ian Hay
- Tilly of Bloomsbury (1921 film) directed by Rex Wilson
- Tilly of Bloomsbury (1931 film) directed by Jack Raymond
- Tilly of Bloomsbury (1940 film) directed by Leslie S. Hiscot
