= The Skin Game (play) =

1920 play by John Galsworthy

The Skin Game is a play by John Galsworthy. It was first performed at the St Martin's Theatre, London, in 1920, and made its way to the Bijou Theatre, Broadway, in the same year. It was included in Burns Mantle's The Best Plays of 1920–1921.

It has been made into a film twice, in 1921 and in 1931, with the latter directed by Alfred Hitchcock.

== Plot ==
The plot tells the story of the interaction between two very different families in rural England just after the end of the First World War. Squire Hillcrist lives in the manor house where his family has lived for generations. He has a daughter, Jill, who is in her late teens and a wife Amy, as well as servants and retainers. He is "old money", although his finances are at a low ebb. The other family is the nouveau riche Hornblowers, headed by the single-minded and rich industrialist Hornblower who throws old retainers the Jackmans out of their home (much to the Squire's disgust), and who plans to surround the Hillcrist's rural estate with factories.

Hillcrist wants to preserve the last piece of open land (known as the "Centry") which adjoins their property but he is (as he sees it) tricked out of the land in an auction. The Hillcrists plan to get even with the upstart Hornblower and fortuitously learn a dark secret about Mr. Hornblower's daughter-in-law Chloe who had once supported herself as the "other party" in divorce cases. When he is told the news, Mr. Hornblower agrees to sell the property to the Hillcrists for less than half the auction price on the condition that the family swears to keep the secret, but the news leaks out via the unprincipled Dawker, Hillcrist's agent and Hornblower's enemy.

Chloe Hornblower goes to the Hillcrists, begging them to help keep the secret from her husband, who is aware that something is going on, then hides behind a curtain when her husband storms into the Hillcrist home demanding to know the secret. Keeping his promise to Chloe, Mr. Hillcrist makes up a story, but the young Hornblower is not convinced and declares that he intends to end his marriage, even though Chloe is pregnant. Upon hearing this, Chloe runs to the lily pond outside the Hillcrist home and tries to drown herself. She is brought into the house and it is clear that she will live.

== List of characters ==
- Hillcrist.................A Country Gentleman
- Amy................ ....His Wife
- Jill................... ....His Daughter
- Dawker................His Agent
- Hornblower..........A Man Newly-Rich
- Charles................His Elder Son
- Chloe...................Wife to Charles
- Rolf.................... .His Younger Son
- Fellows................Hillcrist's Butler
- Anna....................Chloe's Maid
- The Jackmans.....Man and Wife
- An auctioneer, a solicitor, two strangers

== Theme ==
- "Who touches pitch shall be defiled"

The Skin Game first appeared less than two years after the end of the First World War and although not mentioned, some see it as hanging over the drama. The shambling Squire could be seen as a representative of the declining upper class and Hornblower as one who will not let the old style patrician class get them into such a mess again. But this is supposition – though supported by Hillcrist's cry “Who knows where things end when once they begin?”

The attitudes of Hillcrist and his wife are Victorian and Galsworthy was deliberately pointing them out to be so. He was also signalling change in the depiction of the daughter Jill who is modern in her outlook and who, at the beginning of the play, argues for an accommodation rather than a standoff with the Hornblowers. The twenties were to be the age of the flapper and of the final abandonment of Victorian/Edwardian formality and values. It was also to be the era of the rise of the middle class – here represented by the ambitious Dawker and the comically skilful auctioneer (the auction scene is an amusing piece of comic writing providing a pleasant counterpoint to the darker happenings which dominate). Galsworthy's magnum opus known as The Forsyte Saga was being completed at around the same time that he was writing The Skin Game and there are similar themes of social change and the breakdown of conventional class structures in both. The prescience of Galsworthy in foreseeing what was to come between the wars is remarkable.

So whilst the main characters are deliberate caricatures this allows an unequivocal conclusion that Galsworthy was not taking sides in the dispute – even wanting to put a plague on both their houses. The young people (Jill Hillcrist and Rolf Hornblower) are the most rational and conciliatory characters and one feels comfortable that the future belongs to them and not to their prejudiced parents. For some the 1920s might be seen as the last stand of the “Gentleman” before this notion was swept away by the forces that (for example) Evelyn Waugh was to describe in Brideshead Revisited. In Brideshead these forces are depicted by the uncouth Canadian Rex Mottram. Here it is the even rougher Hornblower who challenges the conventions of the past. "Here ye are," he says to Hillcrist, "quite content on what your fathers made for ye. Ye've no ambitions; and ye want other people to have none."

== Selected production history ==
- 2005 Mint Theater Company, New York City, off-Broadway revival by Eleanor Reissa.
- 2007 Orange Tree Theatre, Richmond, London (U.K.), revival by Sam Walters.

== Adaptations ==
=== Film ===
- 1921 silent film, directed by B. E. Doxat-Pratt and starring Edmund Gwenn, Mary Clare, Helen Haye, Dawson Milward and Malcolm Keen.
- 1931 film, adapted and directed by Alfred Hitchcock. It starred C.V. France, Helen Haye, Jill Esmond, Edmund Gwenn, John Longden and Phyllis Konstam.

=== Television ===
There were several versions made for BBC Television:

- 1951, produced by Royston Morley, part of the Sunday Night Theatre series.
- 1959, produced by Chloe Gibson, also for the Sunday Night Theatre.
- 1974, directed by William Slater and produced by Cedric Messina, part of the Play of the Month series.

There was one US TV version:

- 1952, produced by Royston Morley, part of the Kraft Theatre series.

=== Radio ===
It was adapted for Australian radio in 1940 with Peter Finch.

There were several versions made for BBC Radio:

- 1934, adapted by Barbara Burnham and produced by Howard Rose.
- 1941, adapted and produced by Howard Rose.
- 1949, adapted by Howard Rose and produced by Raymond Raikes.
- 1954, adapted by Howard Rose and produced by Mary Hope Allen.
- 1965, adapted by Howard Rose and produced by Audrey Cameron as part of the Saturday Night Theatre series.
