= Marston Garsia =

English barrister (1891–1972)

- Born: 17 July 1891
- Died: 18 July 1972 (aged 81)
- Education: Merton College, Oxford
- Occupations: Actor, barrister, legal writer
- Known for: The Skin Game (1921 film)
- Notable work: Law in a Nutshell series Archbold Criminal Pleading, Evidence and Practice
- Military career
- Branch: Royal Air Force
- Conflicts: World War II

Marston de la Paz Garsia (17 July 1891 – 18 July 1972) was an English actor, barrister and legal scholar. He is known for launching Sweet & Maxwell’s Law in a Nutshell series and for his work as an editor of Archbold Criminal Pleading, Evidence and Practice.

== Early life and education ==
Garsia was born on 17 July 1891 at Fairholme, Weston-super-Mare, Somerset, England. His father was Willoughby Marston de la Paz Garsia (1834–1909), a wealthy physician from Spanish Town, Jamaica. His mother was Minna Frances (née Williams) Garsia (1860–1935), who was born in Ahmedabad, India, where her father was serving as a lieutenant colonel in the British Army.

He was the eldest of four children: Willoughby (born 1893), Christina (born 1894), and Freda (born 1900). The children were educated at home by private tutors and did not attend school, as their father was highly cautious about public health risks. Within the household they developed self-sufficiency and creativity, and Marston frequently led his siblings in staging amateur theatrical productions, foreshadowing his later interest in the theatre.

Garsia went up to Merton College, Oxford, where he read for the Bachelor of Arts degree, conferred on 29 November 1912. He subsequently passed the General Examination for students of the Inns of Court and was called to the Bar by the Middle Temple in 1915.

== Career ==
After his call to the Bar, Garsia joined the South Eastern Circuit and practised primarily in criminal law from chambers in the Temple. He appeared regularly in courts in London and Kent.

At an early stage in his career, he supplemented his income from the Bar by working extensively as a private law tutor, preparing students for the Bar examination, particularly in Roman law, criminal law, criminal procedure and evidence. Later parts of his career were punctuated by appearances on stage and in film, wartime military service, and legal writing.

=== Acting ===
For a brief period Garsia pursued what he described as "a dream of being an actor". In 1920 he appeared on the London stage for one season as the butler Fellows in John Galsworthy’s play The Skin Game at St Martin's Theatre. He reprised the role in the British–Dutch silent film adaptation, The Skin Game (1921).

=== Nutshells ===
In 1921, Sweet & Maxwell published Garsia's Roman Law in a Nutshell, which was written as a concise statement of the law to meet the demands of students who were reading for the Bar final examination. It proved immediately popular with law students, and Garsia launched the Law in a Nutshell series, subsequently authoring the following volumes and revised editions:

- Roman Law in a Nutshell (1st and 2nd edns, Sweet & Maxwell 1921 and 1923).
- Constitutional Law and Legal History in a Nutshell (1st and 2nd edns, Sweet & Maxwell 1922 and 1924).
- Criminal Law in a Nutshell (1st–6th edns, Sweet & Maxwell 1922–1936).
- Evidence in a Nutshell (1st and 2nd edns, Sweet & Maxwell 1922 and 1924).
- Civil Procedure in a Nutshell (1st edn, Sweet & Maxwell 1923).
- Carriage of Goods by Sea in a Nutshell (1st edn, Sweet & Maxwell 1923).
- Master and Servant in a Nutshell (1st and 2nd edns, Sweet & Maxwell 1923 and 1925).
- Wills in a Nutshell (1st edn, Sweet & Maxwell 1924).
- Bankruptcy in a Nutshell (1st edn, Sweet & Maxwell 1928).
- Equity in a Nutshell (1st edn, Sweet & Maxwell 1924).
- Real Property in a Nutshell (1st edn, Sweet & Maxwell 1938) retitled as Conveyancing in a Nutshell (2nd and 3rd edns, Sweet & Maxwell 1948 and 1951).

These books were described both as "cram-books" for times of examination, but also as being intended to assist students in the reading of larger works.

The series became so well known that The Times began Garsia's obituary by saying: "The name of Marston Garsia ... will recall to some members of the Bar their student days and their recourse to his succession of ‘Nutshells’ which helped them to success in Bar Final examinations."

Garsia also wrote A New Guide to the Bar in 1928, which was a practical guide to Bar admission requirements, regulations, and examination preparation (including specimen papers and guidance).

=== Practice at the Bar ===
Garsia appeared regularly in courts in London and Kent. He was known as a forceful and courageous advocate, who had a thorough mastery of every case in which he appeared, but did not achieve the measure of success in the criminal courts which his ability deserved.

He appeared as counsel in numerous reported cases before the Court of Criminal Appeal, including:

- R v Hussey (1925) 180 million App R 160 (use of force against a trespasser).
- R v White (1928) 200 million App R 61 (trial of an alleged habitual criminal).
- R v Frampton (1930) 210 million App R 17 (limits on defence addresses in capital cases).
- R v Towers (1930) 210 million App R 74 (appeals against conviction treated as appeals against sentence).
- R v Pollinger (1931) 220 million App R 75 (imputations on prosecution witnesses).
- R v Larsonneur (1934) 240 million App R 74 (strict liability offences).
- R v Smith (1936) 250 million App R 119 (comment on silence at committal).
- R v Goldfarb [1936] All ER 169; 250 million App R 161 (recommendations for deportation).
- R v Perry (1946) 310 million App R 16 (duplicity of counts in indictments).
- R v Fitzpatrick [1948] 2 KB 203; [1948] 1 All ER 769; 320 million App R 164 (burden of proof on the defendant).

By 1969 he had effectively retired from active practice.

=== Wartime service ===
During the Second World War, Garsia served as an officer in the Royal Air Force.

=== Archbold ===
Together with T. R. F. Butler (who was chief editor), Garsia edited the 31st (1943) through the 37th editions (1969) of Archbold Criminal Pleading, Evidence and Practice.

The Times (London) lauded Garsia's "long association with Archbold," noting that "seven successive editions of the work bear the stamp of his industry and clarity of thought as co-editor."

== Personal life ==
Garsia married Magdelin "Peeps" Maria Wilhelmina Bobbe on 5 April 1941. The couple had one daughter, Marilyn, born in 1944.
