= Maxwell Turner =

English barrister and judge (1907–1960)

HHJ Maxwell Joseph Hall Turner
- Born: 10 May 1907
- Died: 10 December 1960 (aged 53)
- Education: Rugby School
- Alma mater: Trinity College, Oxford
- Occupations: Barrister, judge, legal writer
- Notable work: Archbold Criminal Pleading, Evidence and Practice
- Spouse: Fabia Drake
- Military career
- Allegiance: United Kingdom
- Branch: British Army
- Rank: Lieutenant Colonel
- Conflicts: World War II

Maxwell Joseph Hall Turner (10 May 1907 – 10 December 1960) was an English barrister and judge. He served as senior prosecuting counsel at the Central Criminal Court and later held several part-time judicial appointments before being appointed an additional judge of the former Mayor's and City of London Court.

== Early life and education ==
Turner was born in Kensington, London, the second child and eldest son of Augustus Turner, a solicitor, and his wife Annie Margaret (née Hockley). An elder sibling was John Hastings Turner, later a novelist, dramatist and theatre director.

He was educated at Rugby School and Trinity College, Oxford, and was called to the Bar by the Inner Temple in 1930.

== Career ==
Turner joined the South Eastern Circuit and practised mainly in criminal law from chambers in the Temple. In 1935 he was appointed Prosecuting Counsel to the General Post Office for the circuit.

In 1938 he co-edited the 30th edition of Archbold Criminal Pleading, Evidence and Practice with R. E. Ross.

During the Second World War, Turner served as Military Assistant to the Judge Advocate General, attaining the ranks of Captain, Major and Lieutenant Colonel.

After the war he was appointed Counsel to the Director of Public Prosecutions in certain appeals (1945). He subsequently advanced through the ranks of Treasury Counsel at the Central Criminal Court, serving as Junior Prosecuting Counsel and later as Senior Prosecuting Counsel to the Crown between 1950 and 1959.

He appeared for the Crown in several notable cases, including the Clapham Common murder trial of five youths and the prosecution of the Notting Hill serial killer John Christie in 1953, and that of Guenther Podola in 1959, the last person executed in Great Britain for the murder of a police officer.

According to his wife, Turner generally avoided defence work and sometimes suggested that convicted defendants consider an appeal.

From 1953 he held a series of judicial appointments, including Recorder of Great Yarmouth (1953–58), Deputy Chairman of the East Kent Quarter Sessions (1957–60), and Recorder of Hastings (1958–59). In 1959 he was appointed an additional judge of the former Mayor's and City of London Court.

He was elected a bencher of the Inner Temple in 1960.

== Personal life ==
Turner became engaged in 1938 to the actor Fabia Drake. Drake later wrote that they had first met in the early 1920s through his brother John Hastings Turner. They married in December 1938 and had one daughter, Deirdre, born in March 1940.

== Death ==
Turner was diagnosed with liver cancer in 1959. Drake later wrote that, at her request, doctors did not disclose the seriousness of his condition to him. He died on 10 December 1960 after a brief hospital stay, aged 53.
