= Henry Delacombe Roome =

English barrister (1882-1930)

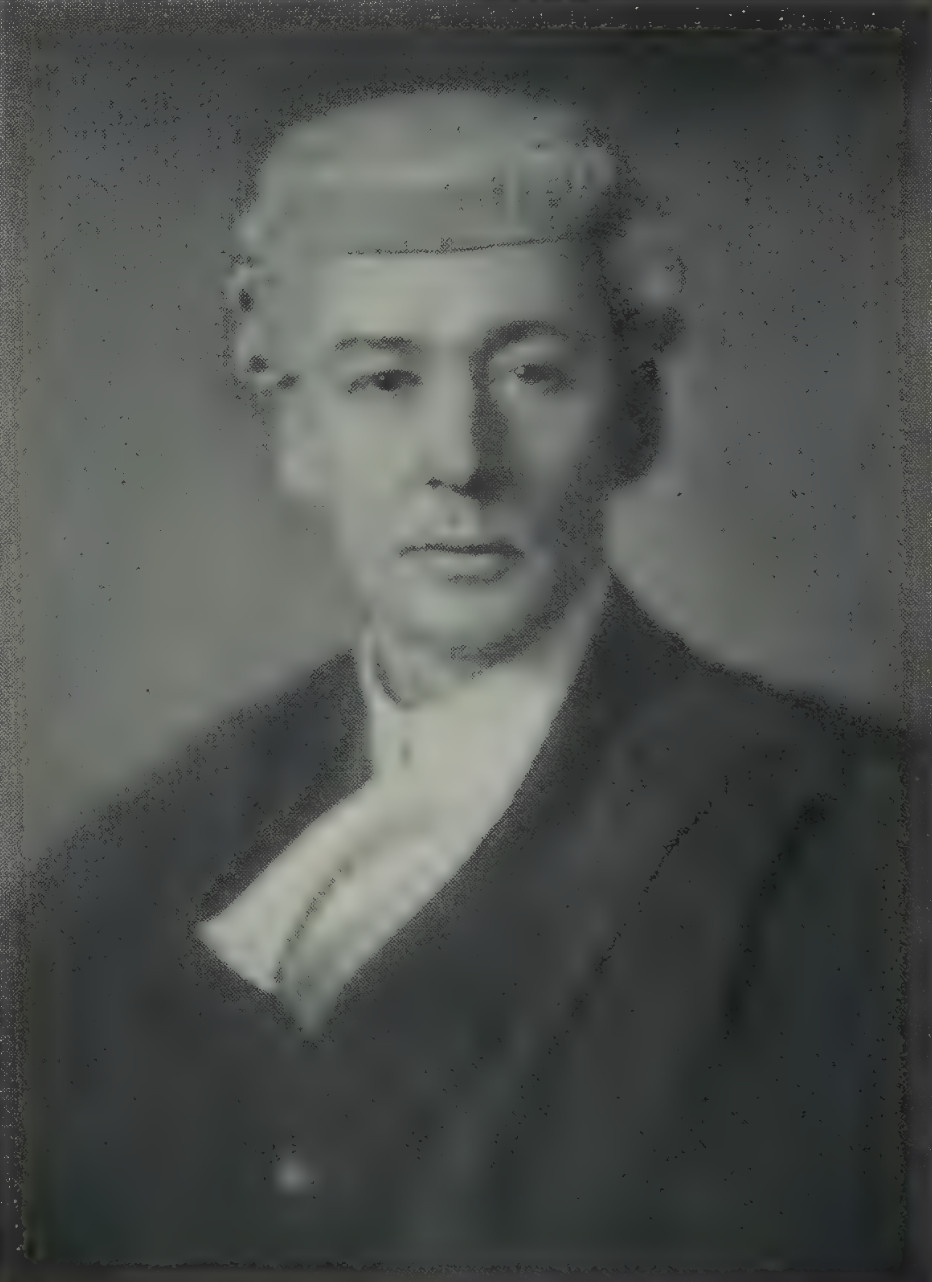
- Born: 16 May 1882
- Died: 8 June 1930 (aged 48)
- Education: Winchester College
- Alma mater: Merton College, Oxford
- Occupations: Barrister, legal writer
- Notable work: Archbold Criminal Pleading, Evidence and Practice
- Political party: Liberal Party
- Spouse: Lilian Aldersey Lloyd

Henry Delacombe Roome (16 May 1882 – 8 June 1930), was an English barrister and legal writer. He served as Senior Prosecuting Counsel to the Crown and was an editor of Archbold Criminal Pleading, Evidence and Practice. He also contested three parliamentary elections as a Liberal Party candidate between 1922 and 1924, without success. His career was cut short by a fatal motor accident at the age of 48.

== Early life and education ==
Roome was born on 16 May 1882, the son of Dr Henry Abercrombie Roome and Flora (née McCrea) Roome. He was educated at Winchester College before going up to Merton College, Oxford.

At Oxford, Roome distinguished himself academically. He was an exhibitioner and won the Stanhope Essay Prize in 1904—an award restricted to undergraduates—for his historical essay on James Francis Edward Stuart, which was published in the same year. He was also an accomplished chess player and represented Oxford in varsity matches against Cambridge from 1902 to 1905.

Roome completed his Bachelor of Arts degree in or shortly after 1905. He subsequently passed the General Examination for students of the Inns of Court and was called to the Bar by the Middle Temple in 1907.

== Career ==
=== Law ===
Following his call to the Bar, Roome joined the South Eastern Circuit and practised primarily in criminal law from chambers in the Temple, London. He established a successful practice and was appointed Counsel to the Crown at the Middlesex Sessions in 1914. In 1920, he became Junior Treasury Counsel to the Crown at the Central Criminal Court, and in 1928 he was appointed Third Senior Treasury Counsel to the Crown.

He appeared for the prosecution in several notable cases, including the murder trials of Dr H. H. Crippen in 1910, Jean-Pierre Vaquier in 1924, and Frederick Browne and William Kennedy in 1928. In 1929, he also prosecuted Clarence Hatry in connection with the forgery and embezzlement scandal that contributed to circumstances leading to the Wall Street crash.

Contemporaries remarked that he was the tallest man at the Bar.

=== Legal writing ===
Roome was an editor of Archbold Criminal Pleading, Evidence and Practice from 1910 to 1927, contributing to the 24th to 27th editions.

He also compiled Archbold on Indictments, a specialised extraction of indictments and commentary from the parent work; a third edition was published in 1916.

In 1914, he published Criminal Offences in Bankruptcy, a specialist monograph analysing the criminal provisions of the newly enacted Bankruptcy Act 1914.

=== Politics ===
Roome was active in Liberal Party politics and stood unsuccessfully for election to the House of Commons on three occasions: Reading in 1922, and St Pancras North in 1923 and 1924. His defeats reflected the declining electoral fortunes of the Liberal Party during the inter-war period.

== Personal life ==
Roome married Lilian Aldersey Lloyd on 22 April 1909. She was the daughter of Commander Edward William Lloyd RN and Charlotte McCrea Taylor. The marriage was childless.

== Death ==
In June 1930, Roome’s career was brought to an abrupt end by a fatal motor accident. While travelling with his wife on a Whitsun holiday tour, a tyre burst on their car, causing a serious crash in Nottinghamshire on 6 June 1930. Both were taken to Retford Hospital; Lilian Roome sustained minor injuries, but Roome suffered severe trauma and died following an emergency operation on 8 June 1930, aged 48.

An obituary in the British Chess Magazine recorded the shock caused by his sudden death, describing him as “a kind man, and a wise, and a good man”, and noting both his legal ability and his energetic, imaginative style as a chess player.
