= Pachamama =

Andean fertility goddess

- Space, time, universe, totality, earth, world, life, age, fertility, nature
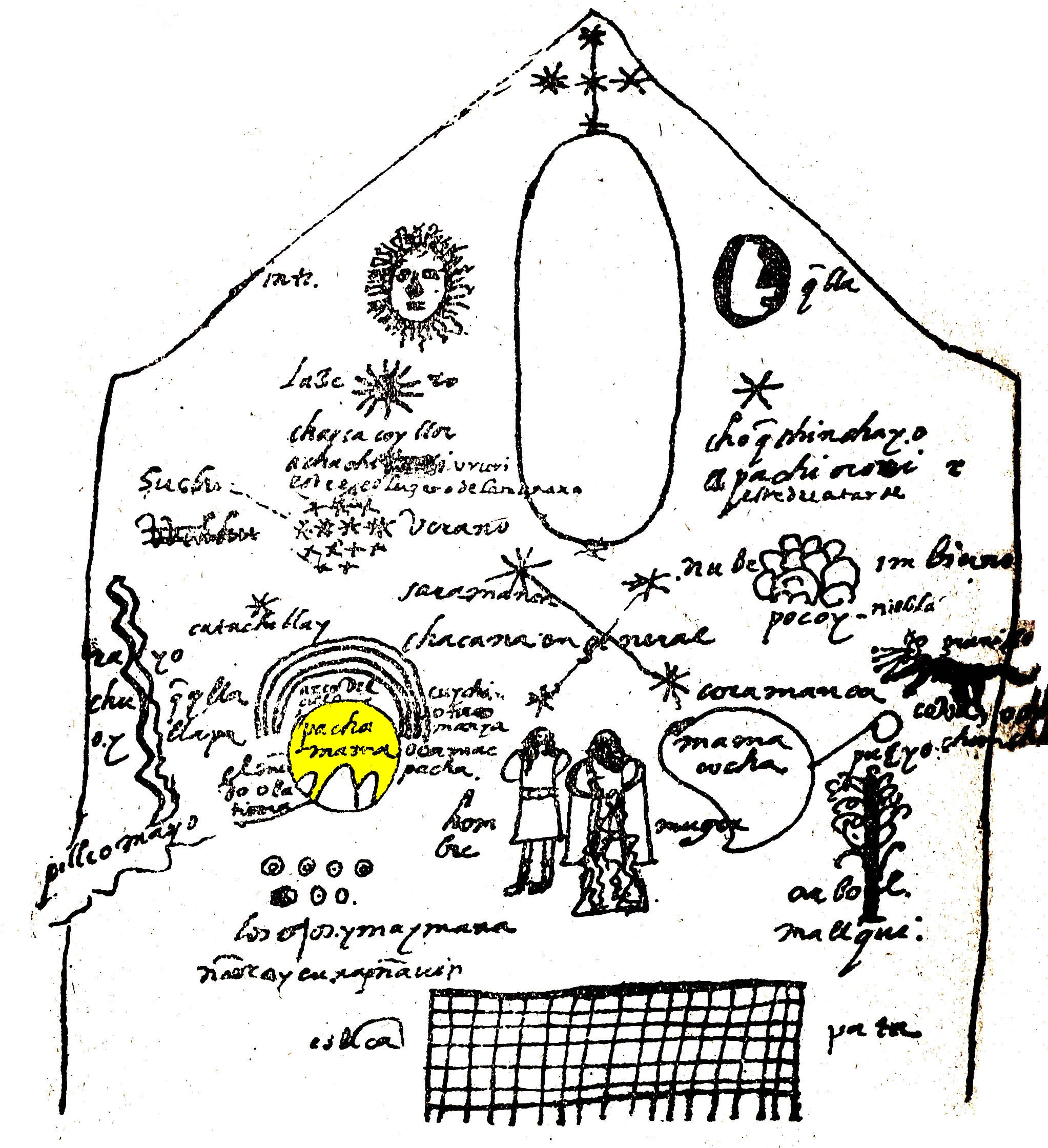
- Representation of Pachamama in the cosmology, illustrated by Juan de Santa Cruz Pachacuti Yamqui Salcamaygua (1613), after a picture in the Sun Temple Qurikancha in Cusco
- Other names: Mama Pacha, Cosmic Mother, Queen Pachamama
- Region: Andes Mountains (Inca Empire)
- Parents: Viracocha
- Consort: Pacha Kamaq, Inti
- Offspring: Inti; Mama Killa

Pachamama (Quechua pronunciation: [ˈpatʃa ˈmama]) or Mama Pacha (pronounced [ˈmama ˈpatʃa]) is the Andean deity representing space-time, revered by the peoples of the Andes. In Inca mythology and religion, she is a "mother goddess" type deity, representing the universal energy that connects everything, linked to space, time, the universe, totality, life, fertility, and nature. She is considered an omnipresent deity with creative power, capable of sustaining life in the cosmos. The four cosmological Quechua principles—Water, Earth, Sun, and Moon—claim Pachamama as their prime origin.

In various myths, Pachamama is described as the wife of Pachacámac and mother of Mama Quilla (the goddess of the moon) and Inti (the god of the sun). She is attributed with the role of mother of the world, from whom the material and spiritual sustenance of human beings comes.

Pachamama was commonly worshipped in her earthly manifestation or form called Allpamama or Mama Allpa (goddess of the earth), her shrines consisted of sacred rocks or the trunks of legendary trees, and artists depicted her as a woman bearing harvests of potatoes or coca leaves. Priests sacrifice offerings of llamas, cuy (guinea pigs), and elaborate, miniature, burned garments to her.

In Andean cosmogony, Pachamama transcends the earthly realm and is associated with a spatio-temporal unity or with states of consciousness known as «Pachakuna». More than a deity, Pachamama represents the living totality that sustains, nourishes and welcomes all beings in the cosmos.

After the Spanish colonization of the Americas, they converted the native populations of the region to Roman Catholicism. Through religious syncretism, the figure of the Virgin Mary was associated with that of Pachamama for many Indigenous peoples.

As Andean cultures formed modern nations, the figure of Pachamama was still believed to be benevolent, generous with her gifts, and a local name for Mother Nature. In the 21st century, many Indigenous peoples in South America base environmental concerns in these ancient beliefs, saying that problems arise when people take too much from nature because they are taking too much from Pachamama.

== Etymology ==
The word Pachamama comes from the Quechua language and is composed of two terms:

- Pacha: a complex word meaning ‘world, universe, space-time, totality, era, cosmos’.It is a broad concept encompassing both the physical realm (matter) and the cosmic and temporal realm (space-time). It is not limited to the earth in a literal sense, but evokes the cosmos or the universal order.
- Mama: means mother, but also represents the feminine principle that generates and nourishes life. It is the maternal aspect that fertilizes, sustains, and cares for all that exists. The concept complements the Andean worldview, which recognizes in the mother not only a physical body, but also a vital and spiritual principle that sustains all forms of existence.

This designation reveals a holistic understanding of the universe where Pachamama is not simply “Mother Earth,” but the “Mother of Time-Space,” the Cosmic Matrix that contains and generates all existence. In the Andean worldview, she is simultaneously:

- Pachamama Teqsimuyoj: The organizer of the cosmos
- Pachamama Kawsaynin: The source of all life
- Pachamama Sonqo: The heart of the universe

== Description of Pachamama ==
She is normally a loving and generous goddess, but she can be terrible, cruel, and destructive when she is upset or feels hurt, capable of destroying men and everything above or within her. Pachamama is an ancient and primordial goddess who does not need temples or specific places of worship, although she likes springs, simply because she is everywhere and at all times.

Pachamama, "Mother Cosmos," is the whole. The whole in these traditions is more than the sum of its parts (similar to Gestalt psychological theory). What affects the parts affects the whole and vice versa (systemic theory). According to the Andean worldview, Pachamama is present in everything and everywhere (space/time), hence its holistic vision (Holistic Theory), because in the human world, what affects one of its elements necessarily affects the rest. Just as organs are indispensable in a living organism, the organism is present in each of the organs (interdependence). It is a communal and supportive world in which there is no room for exclusion. Everyone (whether a person, a tree, a stone, etc.) is as important as everyone else. The holism of Pachamama is characteristic of a collectivist world, affected by a sense of belonging: one always knows that one is a member of a community to which one feels intimately committed. This community lives within us ("Ayllu"). This is how we experience the unity of our own life with the entire life of the Andean human world.

Andean culture is associated with the stars; they made the constellations imaginary lines to represent the forces or energies that favor the fertility of everything in the biosphere. Fertility is a vital issue for the Andean people, as it extends to the flowering of crops, the arrival of spring, and the reproduction of animals. Pachamama plays the role of cosmic mother; from Pachamama's fertility, the cosmos is born, the earth is fertilized, and then it flourishes.

Pachamama, with her telluric force, creates everything that exists, while the fertilizing principle of Pachatata possesses its own pure cosmic energy, invisible to the human eye.

Pachamama often manifests herself through other deities. For example, Blas Valera, in his manuscript Exsul immeritus Blas Valera populo suo, mentions the goddess Allpacamasca (Allpamama) as "the animated earth," which he represents with a small, earth-colored female face, that is, a living and fertilizing aspect of the goddess Pachamama. Sumac Ñusta, another aspect of Pachamama, suggests the ability of each ñusta to connect heaven and earth through her sexual act with Inti, the Inca, the sun on earth; there are therefore at least three diversifications: Pachamama, Allpacamasca, and Sumac Ñusta.

Pachamama is a generative and sustaining deity; as Allpamama, she protects human beings, makes life possible, and promotes fertility and fecundity. In exchange for this help and protection, the shepherd of the southern Puna is obliged to offer part of what he receives to Allpamama, not only at the times and places predetermined by the ritual, but also at all significant cultural events, thus establishing a kind of reciprocity (ayni). However, she is also considered to have a negative side: Allpamama is often hungry, and if she is not nourished with offerings or if she is offended, she can cause a cosmic imbalance that breaks the universal harmony affecting all worlds, because everything is connected in a holistic harmony.

In Andean cosmogony, Pachamama is seen as a guardian being that transcends the earthly condition and is associated with a space-time unity or states of consciousness called "Pachakuna," which include: Hawa Pacha or "Outside or external space-time"; Haqay Pacha or "Beyond space-time"; Hanan Pacha or "Upper space-time"; Kay Pacha or "The here and now", "This space-time"; Hurin Pacha or "Lower space-time" and Uku Pacha or "Inside or internal space-time"

== Modern-day rituals ==
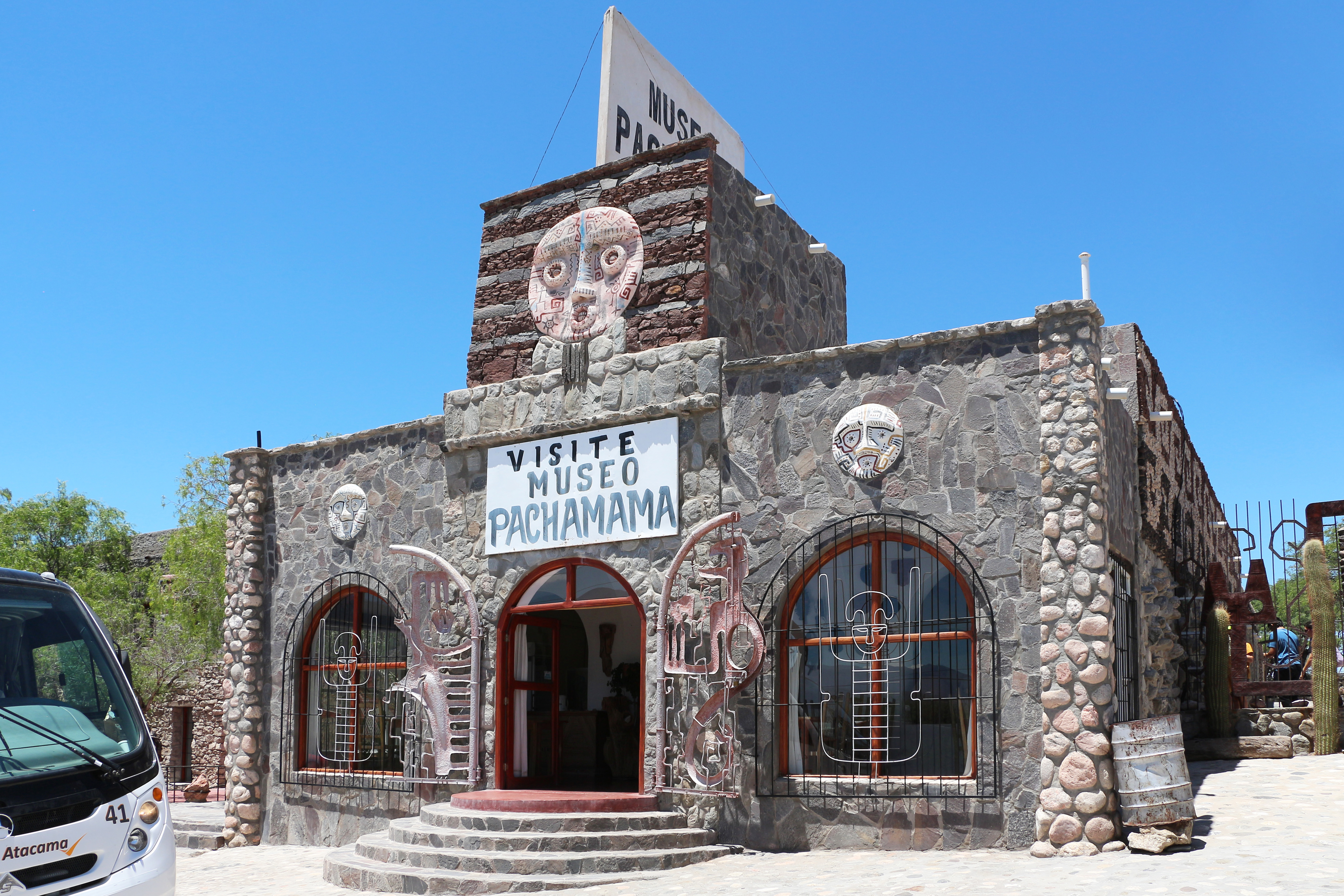
Pachamama Museum in Argentina

Pachamama and her sun-husband, Inti, are worshipped as benevolent deities in the area known as Tawantinsuyu. Tawantinsuyu is the name of the former Inca Empire, and the region stretches through the Andean mountains in present-day Bolivia, Ecuador, Chile, Peru, Colombia and northern Argentina. People usually give a toast to honor Pachamama before meetings and festivities. In some regions, people perform a special kind of libation known as a challa on a daily basis. They spill a small amount of chicha on the floor, for the goddess, and then drink the rest.

Pachamama has a special worship day called Martes de challa (Challa's Tuesday). People bury food, throw candies, and burn incense to thank Pachamama for their harvests. In some cases, celebrants assist traditional priests, known as yatiris in Aymara, in performing ancient rites to bring good luck or the good will of the goddess, such as sacrificing guinea pigs or burning llama fetuses (although this is rare today). The festival coincides with the Christian holiday of Shrove Tuesday, also celebrated among Catholics as Carnevale or Mardi Gras.

The central ritual to Pachamama is the Challa or Pago (payment). It is carried out during all of August, and in many places also on the first Friday of each month. Other ceremonies are carried out in special times, as upon leaving for a trip or upon passing an apacheta. According to Mario Rabey and Rodolfo Merlino, Argentine anthropologists who studied the Andean culture from the 1970s to the 1990s,

"The most important ritual is the challaco. Challaco is a deformation of the Quechua words 'ch'allay' and 'ch'allakuy', that refer to the action to insistently sprinkle. In the current language of the campesinos of the southern Central Andes, the word challar is used in the sense of "to feed and to give drink to the land". The challaco covers a complex series of ritual steps that begin in the family dwellings the night before. They cook a special food, the tijtincha. The ceremony culminates at a pond or stream, where the people offer a series of tributes to Pachamama, including "food, beverage, leaves of coca and cigars."

=== Household rituals ===
Rituals to honor Pachamama take place all year, but are especially abundant in August, right before the sowing season. Because August is the coldest month of the winter in the southern Andes, people feel more vulnerable to illness. August is therefore regarded as a "tricky month." During this time of mischief, Andeans believe that they must be on very good terms with nature to keep themselves and their crops and livestock healthy and protected. In order to do this, families perform cleansing rituals by burning plants, wood, and other items in order to scare evil spirits, who are thought to be more abundant at this time. People also drink mate (a South American hot beverage), which is thought to give good luck.

On the night before August 1, families prepare to honor Pachamama by cooking all night. The host of the gathering then makes a hole in the ground. If the soil comes out nicely, this means that it will be a good year; if not, the year will not be bountiful. Before any of the guests are allowed to eat, the host must first give a plate of food to Pachamama. Food that was left aside is poured onto the ground and a prayer to Pachamama is recited.

=== Sunday parade ===
A main attraction of the Pachamama festival is the Sunday parade. The organizational committee of the festival searches for the oldest woman in the community and elects her the "Pachamama Queen of the Year." This election first occurred in 1949. Indigenous women, in particular senior women, are seen as incarnations of tradition and as living symbols of wisdom, life, fertility, and reproduction. The Pachamama queen who is elected is escorted by the gauchos, who circle the plaza on their horses and salute her during the Sunday parade. The Sunday parade is considered to be the climax of the festival.

== New Age worship ==
Since the late 20th century, a New Age practice of worship to Pachamama has developed among Andean white and mestizo peoples. Believers perform a weekly ritual worship which takes place on Sundays and includes invocations to Pachamama in Quechua, although there may be some references in Spanish. They have a temple, which inside contains a large stone with a medallion on it, symbolizing the New Age group and its beliefs. A bowl of dirt on the right of the stone is there to represent Pachamama, because of her status as a Mother Earth.

Certain travel agencies have drawn upon the emerging New Age movement in Andean communities (drawn from Quechua ritual practices) to urge tourists to visit Inca sites. Tourists visiting such sites as Machu Picchu and Cusco, are also offered the chance to participate in ritual offerings to Pachamama.

== Pachamama and Christianity ==
Many rituals related to the Pachamama are practiced in conjunction with those of Christianity, to the point that many families are simultaneously Christian and pachamamistas.

According to scholar Manuel Marzal, in modern day Peru, the cult of Pachamama has, in some cases, taken on Christian characteristics or been reinterpreted within a Catholic religious framework. Rites like the offering to Pachamama have incorporated "certain Christian symbols and prayers" and have also been "the object of Christian reinterpretations," both implicit and explicit. One of these reinterpretations is that Pachamama represents the natural bounty created by God. For some Andeans, he writes, "Pachamama has lost its original identity and has changed into a symbol of the providence of the one God, or [...] a sacred reality that feeds humankind on behalf of God."

Along similar lines, Pope John Paul II, in two homilies delivered in Peru and Bolivia, identified homage to Pachamama as an ancestral recognition of divine providence that in some sense prefigured a Christian attitude toward creation. On February 3, 1985, he stated that "your ancestors, by paying tribute to the earth (Mama Pacha), were doing nothing other than recognizing the goodness of God and his beneficent presence, which provided them food by means of the land they cultivated." On May 11, 1988, he stated that God "knows what we need from the food that the earth produces, this varied and expressive reality that your ancestors called "Pachamama" and that reflects the work of divine providence as it offers us its gifts for the good of man."

Marzal also states that for some Andeans, Pachamama retains an "intermediary role" between God and man within a primarily Catholic framework similar to that of the saints. Some ethnographic scholars have also noted a syncretic identification of Pachamama with the Virgin Mary. Pachamama is sometimes syncretized as the Virgin of Candelaria.

In October 2019, native Amazonian artworks were displayed in the Vatican gardens, and in a Roman church, ahead of the Synod of Bishops for the Pan-Amazon region. Wooden sculptures in the form of a pregnant woman were labeled "Pachamama" in the media. Pope Francis, calling them Pachamama, apologized when they were stolen and thrown into the Tiber by assailants who accused them of idolatry. In his statement, the Pope clarified that there "was no idolatrous intention" in bringing the statues to the Vatican. Cardinal Gerhard Müller stated that "The great mistake was to bring the idols into the church, not to put them out."

== Political usage ==
Belief in Pachamama features prominently in the Peruvian national narrative. Former President Alejandro Toledo held a symbolic inauguration on 28 July 2001 atop Machu Picchu. The ceremony featured a Quechua religious elder giving an offering to Pachamama. Some Andean intellectuals identify Pachamama as an example of autochthony.

Former Bolivian president Evo Morales invoked the name of Pachamama, as well as using language and symbolism that appealed to Bolivia's Indigenous population, in speeches throughout his presidency.

== See also ==
- Atabey
- Bhumi
- Gaia
- Goddess I
- Law of the Rights of Mother Earth
- List of earth deities
- Mama Ocllo
- Mother goddess
- Mother Nature
- Pachamama Raymi
- Willka Raymi
- Gastrotheca pacchamama
