= Fabia Drake =

British actress (1904–1990)

Fabia Drake OBE
- Born: Ethel McGlinchy; 20 January 1904; Herne Bay, Kent, England
- Died: 28 February 1990 (aged 86); London, England
- Occupation: actress
- Spouse: Maxwell Turner

Fabia Turner (20 January 1904 – 28 February 1990), professionally known as Fabia Drake, was an English actress whose professional career spanned almost 73 years during the 20th century.

Drake was born in Herne Bay, Kent. Her first professional role in a film was in Fred Paul's Masks and Faces (1917), and her last role was as Madame de Rosemonde in Miloš Forman's Valmont (1989).

Drake was a lifelong friend of Noël Coward and Laurence Olivier.

== Early life ==
Born Ethel McGlinchy, the actress's Irish father, a caterer, was an actor manqué. She passed an entrance test to the Academy of Dramatic Art (later to become RADA) in December 1913. (It was the high-ups at the ADA who decided McGlinchy was too difficult to pronounce and too hard to remember for a stage name so she changed it, ultimately by deed-poll, to Drake which was the second of her father's Christian names and to Fabia which was the second of her baptismal names, chosen because she was born on St Fabian's Day) (Pope Fabian). Her contemporaries at the Academy of Dramatic Art, which was founded by Sir Herbert Beerbohm Tree, included the actress Meggie Albanesi, Eva Le Gallienne, and Miles Malleson – a senior student who wrote plays for her. Despite being about five feet seven inches tall she was called 'the Shrimp', and played a very wide range of parts – Richard II, Macbeth, Cardinal Richelieu in Bulwer Lytton's play, the Shaughraun in Dion Boucicault's The Shaughraun. Her teachers included Norman Page, whom she admired and to whose teaching she responded – "he gave you confidence, he inspired you with his enthusiasm", and Helen Haye, to whom she did not respond and who was not, according to Drake, a great teacher. She made her first professional appearance on a stage at the Court Theatre, Sloane Square, in a children's theatre production titled The Cockjolly Bird as a hermit land-crab – "in a shell of immense weight and unparalleled discomfort." Her first paid work came when she was cast in a production of The Happy Family. Also in the cast was Noël Coward. It was the beginning of a lifelong friendship. In the same year, 1916, she met Ellen Terry, when she played Robin, Falstaff's diminutive page in scenes from The Merry Wives of Windsor, for a week, at the Palace Pier Theatre in Brighton.

Besides acting the most formative influence in Drake's childhood was the Anglican religion – later seceded from – and the outstanding memory of her Christmases was the sung Saint Cecilia Mass of Gounod, at the Midnight Mass in the Anglo-Catholic church of All Saints, Margaret Street. When one year the chorister set to play Sir Toby Belch in the kitchen scene from Twelfth Night fell ill, Drake was called in to replace him, and so she met a junior chorister also in the production – Laurence Olivier. "His subsequent intimate friendship became one of my most treasured possessions; we would watch each other’s work, stay in each other’s houses, be available during public and private moments of triumph and disaster" she wrote, though she never played with him again. At the age of 16, she was sent to a finishing school in France, Camposenea at Meudon-val-Fleury. It had been a hunting lodge of Louis XIV and the sunken marble bath of Madame de Maintenon was still in place. She was taken to Reims, in ruins after World War I, to Versailles, Chartres, the Forest of Fontainebleau, and she was taught by Georges Le Roy sociétaire of the Comédie-Française who was to become one of the great teachers of the Paris Conservatoire.

=== Career ===
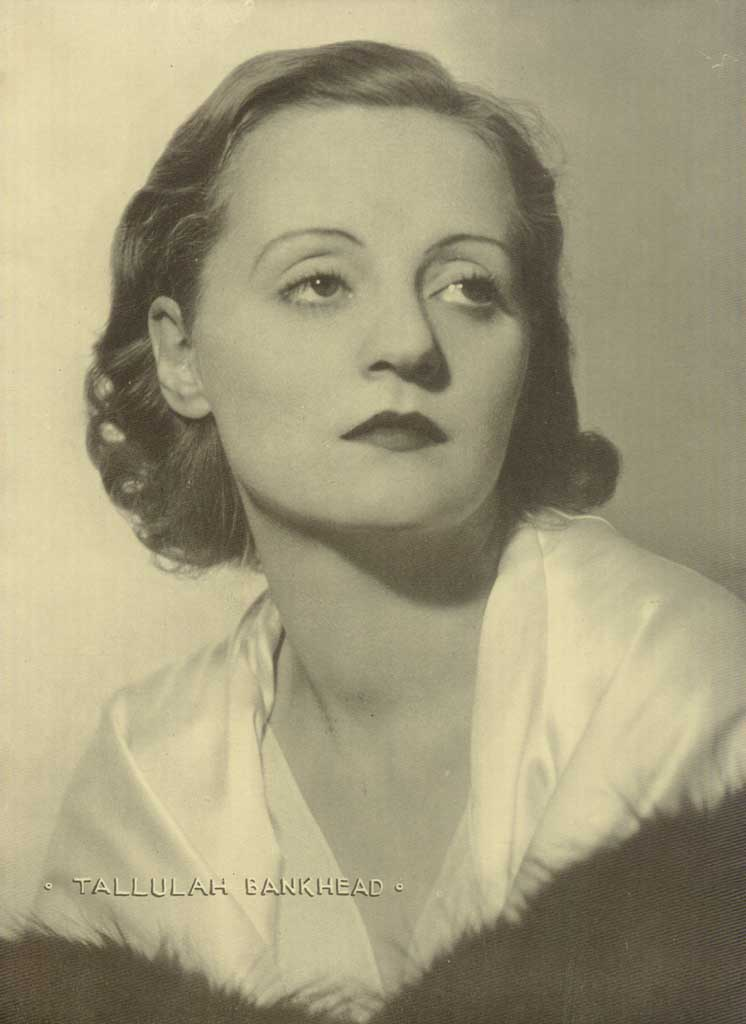
Drake worked with Tallulah Bankhead (above) on Roland Pertwee's The Creaking Chair. Bankhead was 23, Drake 20. Bankhead found Drake's virginity an absurdity: "Such a shocking waste, Dahrling, with your figure." They became genuine, if unlikely, friends; Tallulah was a wit, with warmth and generosity.

Back in London in 1921 and unemployed, she spent time with Meggie Albanesi in her dressing room during her 'waits' in Albanesi's current success A Bill of Divorcement at St Martin's Theatre. Drake wrote "Albanesi was by now established as the most talented young actress in England, under contract to Basil Dean...the warmth and sympathy of her personality was like a lodestar in my bleak night sky." Having tried, and failed, to gain employment with J. E. Vedrenne, Drake decided to join Madame Alice Gachet's French acting classes at RADA, another teacher of brilliance, whose most famous pupil was Charles Laughton. She then signed with Vedrenne for 18 months, playing small parts and understudying, and was then sent to Basil Dean who was about to produce James Elroy Flecker's Hassan. This proved a memorable production: incidental music was by Frederick Delius, the great ballet in the House-of-the-Moving-Walls was devised by Fokine, and the cast included Malcolm Keen as the Caliph and Henry Ainley as Hassan. Drake, an understudy, played both of the two women's parts in the play, Yasmin and Pervaneh, when Isabel Jeans (Yasmin) and Laura Cowrie (Pervaneh) both went down with influenza in the epidemic of 1923.

When C. Aubrey Smith needed an actress to play his daughter in a production of Roland Pertwee's The Creaking Chair, his wife suggested Fabia and she was released from Hassan to create her own, first, part. The play ran for six months, directed by Gerald du Maurier, and starred Tallulah Bankhead as well as Aubrey Smith.

Shortly after this Drake worked with Marie Tempest in a play by John Hastings Turner titled The Scarlet Lady. In Marie Tempest, she found " artistic understanding, comradeship and succour." The play was a success when it opened and brought Drake some critical attention. Charles Langbridge Morgan, then critic of The Times (October 1926) wrote "Fabia Drake...she has not been long on the professional stage. She has judgment and poise and a mind that lifts a trivial part out of its triviality." And James Agate in The Sunday Times (3 October 1926) wrote "Miss Fabia Drake is probably the best ingénue on the present-day stage, and provided she is able to conceal, her brains will one day make a popular success. She suggests health, physical, mental and moral."

RADA ex-students formed The RADA Players, and Drake became the second of its secretaries. In a play of Allan Monkhouse's titled Sons and Fathers, Drake played opposite John Gielgud. She was the victim of serious stage-fright at this period in her career, the result of a spasm in her throat that prevented her from speaking and that she feared would return at inopportune moments.

In 1929, she went with the Memorial Theatre, Stratford-on-Avon on its tour of the United States – in three weeks she had to learn the parts of Lady Macbeth, Beatrice in Much Ado About Nothing, the Queen in Hamlet ('but I should never have been cast to play Gertrude. I was only 25, just a touch on the young side when the Hamlet is nearing 40'), Mistress Page in The Merry Wives of Windsor, Hippolyta in A Midsummer Night's Dream, and Viola in Twelfth Night. As Lady Macbeth in 1933 at Stratford, the Komisarjevsky production, in the sleepwalking scene, she was painted by Walter Sickert – the work was exhibited at the Royal Academy exhibition in 1934 to celebrate Sickert's election as R.A. Shortly before leaving on the White Star liner SS Megantic rehearsing Macbeth she suffered a recurrence of the spasm in her throat and so the trip began with an element of fear.

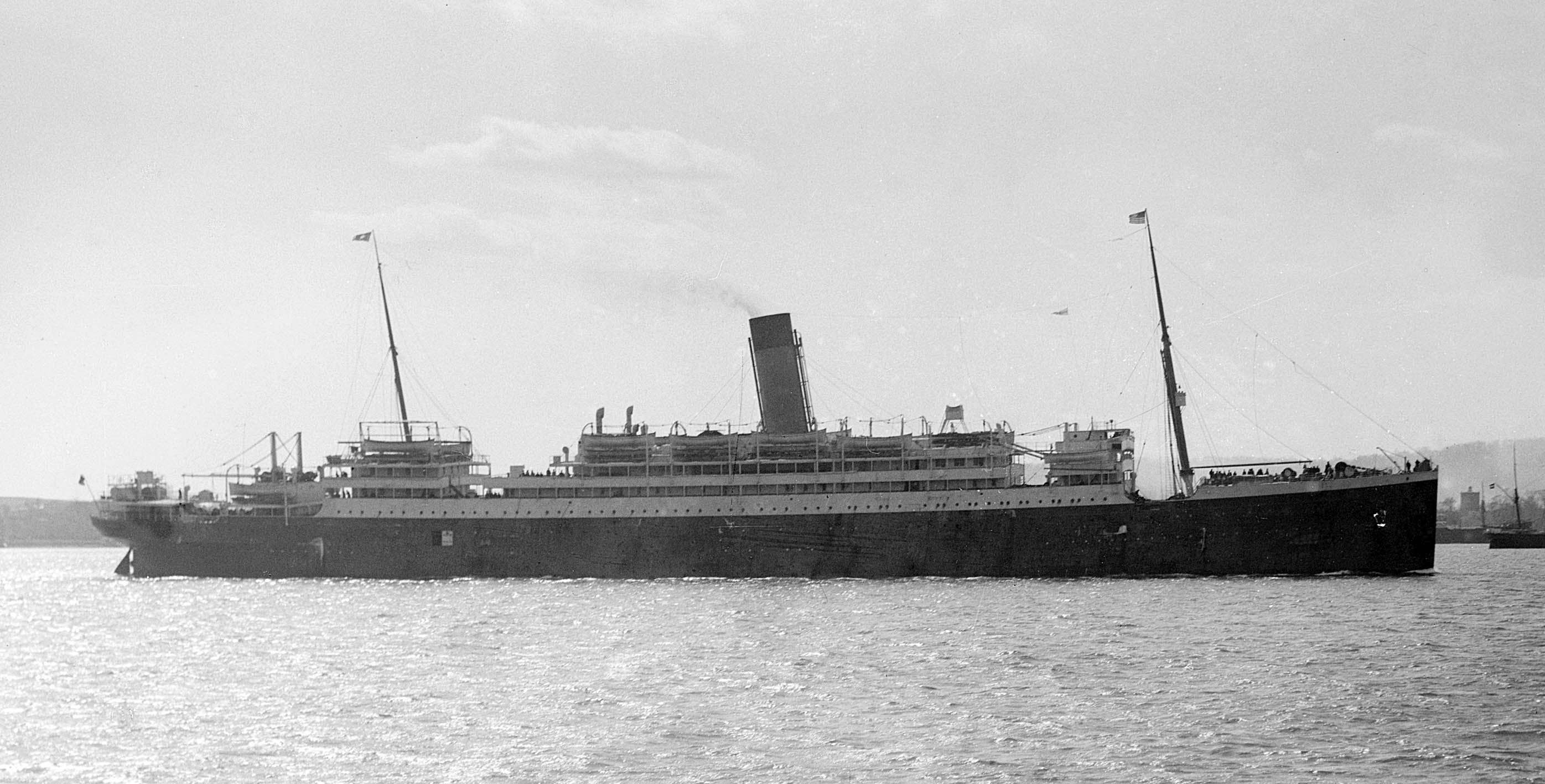
Drake was offered a contract for a six-month tour of the U.S. and Canada – a very demanding one, nine plays, eight of them to be presented one after the other in the first week. She had to learn her parts in three weeks. "Mistress Page proved a great stumbling block. She speaks only prose...only two days were left for Mrs Page: 'Oh I can finish her off (she nearly finished me off) on board the boat", (the SS Megantic, above) – Drake wrote that the 'cramming' required to play all the parts harmed her ability to play some of these later in her career

Afraid of a choking fit and being unable to speak her lines she nevertheless got through her performances in Boston, Pittsburgh, Cleveland, St Louis, Denver, and Washington – but in Chicago, she finally reached the end of her strength. She sought psychiatric help and with the psychiatrist traced the first intrusion of her phobia into her work on the stage and its possible origin in a lie she had told to avoid catechism when she had made herself sick by pushing a spoon down her throat. Until her temporary retirement from the stage, when she got married, she was henceforth to make herself physically sick before each and every performance to get rid of the choking before she went near the stage. Back in England, her friend John Gielgud asked her to play Rosalind in a production of As You Like It at the Old Vic – Drake became closely identified with this role. In 1931, she made another tour of the U.S. and Canada, this time meeting Ivor Novello in Los Angeles – he too became a friend. Back from Hollywood, she played in the opening performance at the Stratford-on-Avon Memorial Theatre, Henry IV, Part I, which was a near disaster because much of the performance was inaudible. Drake, playing the minute part of Lady Percy, was helped by the fact that she played her first scene on the 'apron-stage, and was completely audible. The critics noticed her performance all the more; H. V. Morton covered the event for the Daily Herald and the next morning the Daily Herald produced a placard on its billboards which read: All Stratford talks of one woman.

Following her marriage in December 1938 to Maxwell Turner, a barrister-at-law, she retired entirely from the stage. Her daughter was born in March 1940. Over 10 years of provoking physical sickness before each and every performance had taken its toll, but in 1943, when Sir Kenneth Barnes asked her to join his depleted teaching staff at RADA she was recovered and available. For the three years 1943, 1944, 1945 she worked with students, work which she later described as, 'one of the most stimulating and rewarding periods' of her life. Her students included Roger Moore, John Neville, Robert Shaw, and Richard Johnson. She also undertook a production of Henry V, although it was not with RADA students, but with American Army personnel. Renée Asherson appeared in the production, the French Princess of the film version. (Having seen this production Robert Donat asked Drake to undertake the casting and production of his forthcoming post-war season in management at the Aldwych Theatre). Drake's teaching work finished at RADA when she began to have pain in her jaw, and she had to leave in the middle of a term.

She became interested in researching Shakespeare's troupe of actors, men like Richard Burbage and Thomas Pope, and the effect the actors had on Shakespeare's creation of roles for them.

Her husband having died from liver cancer at the age of 53, she was invited by Binkie Beaumont to return to the theatre. She accepted the offer of a part in a thriller called Write Me a Murder by Frederick Knott. She continued to work on radio and on television, including work with Dickie Henderson in comedy sketches for Thames TV, and Leslie Crowther (in ATV's Big Boy, Now!), as well as in major series like The Pallisers and P. G. Wodehouse's, The World of Wooster, playing Bertie Wooster's outrageous Aunt Agatha, with Ian Carmichael (Bertie) and Dennis Price (the inimitable Jeeves), and an acclaimed performance as the eccentric, reclusive Anglo-Indian matriarch Mabel Layton in The Jewel in the Crown (1984).

There were also two notable screen performances in her last years, as Catherine Alan in A Room with a View (1985) and as Madame de Rosemonde in Valmont (1989), in which The New York Times praised her performance for its "quiet dignity."

She was awarded the OBE in 1987.

== Personal life and death ==
Drake married Maxwell Turner, a barrister-at-law and brother of John Hastings Turner, the dramatist of her two plays with Marie Tempest, in December 1938. The marriage produced one child, a daughter.

Drake died on 28 February 1990.

== Filmography ==
=== Film ===
| Year | Title | Role | Notes |
|---|---|---|---|
| 1917 | Masks and Faces | Triplet's Child | |
| 1938 | Meet Mr. Penny | Annie Penny | |
| 1948 | London Belongs to Me | Mrs Jan Byl | |
| 1949 | All Over the Town | Miss Gelding | |
| 1949 | Poet's Pub | Lady Mercy Cotton | |
| 1951 | White Corridors | Miss Farmer | |
| 1951 | Young Wives' Tale | Nanny Blott | |
| 1952 | The Hour of 13 | Lady Elmbridge | |
| 1954 | Fast and Loose | Mrs Crabb | |
| 1954 | Isn't Life Wonderful! | Lady Probus | |
| 1955 | All for Mary | Opulent Lady | |
| 1956 | My Wife's Family | Arabella Parker | |
| 1957 | The Good Companions | Mrs Tarvin | |
| 1957 | Not Wanted on Voyage | Mrs Brough | |
| 1958 | Girls at Sea | Lady Kitty Hewitt | |
| 1959 | Operation Bullshine | Junior Commander Maddox A.T.S | |
| 1961 | Seven Keys | Mrs Piggott | |
| 1961 | What a Whopper | Mrs Pinner | |
| 1969 | A Nice Girl Like Me | Miss Grimsby | |
| 1970 | Tam Lin | Miss Gibson | |
| 1974 | Got It Made | Aunt Olive | |
| 1985 | Year of the Dragon | Nun | |
| 1985 | A Room with a View | Miss Catharine Allan | |
| 1989 | Valmont | Madame de Rosemonde | (final film role) |

== Television ==
| Year | Title | Role | Notes |
|---|---|---|---|
| 1957 | Nicholas Nickleby | Madame Mantalini | 3 episodes |
| 1960 | Persuasion | Lady Russell | 3 episodes |
| 1964 | The Saint | Aunt Hattie | Episode: The Miracle Tea Party |
| 1965 | The Saint | Aunt Prudence | Episode: The Smart Detective |
| 1965-67 | The World of Wooster | Aunt Agatha | 4 episodes |
| 1966 | The Avengers | Colonel Adams | Episode: The Danger Makers |
| 1967 | The Prisoner | Welfare Worker | Episode: Arrival (The Prisoner) |
| 1969-70 | A Present for Dickie | Mrs. Upshott-Mainwaring | 6 episodes (Lost) |
| 1971 | Doctor at Large The Liver Birds | Dr Whiteland | Episode 10: Upton Sells Out? episode 12 series 2 |
| 1974 | The Pallisers | Countess of Midlothian | TV mini-series; 4 episodes |
| 1974 | Sykes | Miss Bandicoot | Episode: A Bandage |
| 1976-77 | Big Boy Now! | Mrs Heather Marchant | 14 episodes |
| 1984 | Crown Court | Miss Simpson | 3 episodes |
| 1984 | The Jewel in the Crown | Mabel Layton | TV mini-series; 4 episodes |
| 1984 | Miss Marple | Miss Henderson | Episode: A Pocket Full of Rye |
| 1985 | Screen Two | Mrs Blake | Episode: Lent |
| 1988 | Inspector Morse | Mrs Jarman | Episode: Last Bus to Woodstock |
| 1988 | The Rainbow | Aunt Olga | Episode: The Darkness of Paradise |
| 1989 | Boon | Mary Fraser | Episode: Sickness and Health |

== Autobiography ==
- Blind Fortune published by William Kimber (1978)
