= Fault (law) =

Fault, as a legal term, refers to legal blameworthiness and responsibility in each area of law. It refers to both the actus reus and the mental state of the defendant. The basic principle is that a defendant should be able to contemplate the harm that his actions may cause, and therefore should aim to avoid such actions. Different forms of liability employ different notions of fault, in some there is no need to prove fault, but the absence of it.

In criminal law, the mens rea is used to decide if the defendant has criminal intent when he commits the act and, if so, he is therefore liable for the crime. However, this is not necessary for strict liability offences, where no particular state of mind is required to satisfy the burden of proof.

== Actus reus element ==
Most requirements for a successful actus reus require a voluntary act, or omission, for evidence of fault. There is also a requirement for a clear causation, there is no liability or fault if the defendant was not actually the sole cause of the act, this is so if there was an intervention of a third party, an unexpected natural event, or the victim's own act. Either of these can remove the legal blame from the defendant and remove the fault.

=== Automatism ===
If the criminal act is caused by an act of automatism, it means the act was caused by an involuntary movement of the limbs, and not controlled by neuron stimulation, removing the blameworthiness from the defendant. This was seen in the case of Hill V. Baxter (1958) where the defendant injured a person by crashing his car into them. He argued that his action was not voluntary because he was unaware of what happened. However, he was found guilty because the judge held that sleepiness or drowsiness when driving does not amount to automatism.

=== Duress ===
In the case of duress, the defendant has committed the act in response to a threat of death or serious personal injury to himself or a loved one, or someone towards whom he feels responsible. Therefore he is removed of fault as his actions were done to prevent such harm being done. It would be considered unfair to place the defendant at fault of a criminal action which he committed under duress.

=== Liability ===
In such cases of a "state-of-affairs" crimes, the defendant may be found liable even if he or she did not purposefully or voluntarily commit a criminal act. This is seen in R v Larsonneur (1933), where the defendant was French and entered the UK. She then tried to marry a British citizen, after which she would have gained British citizenship, which she could never be subsequently deprived of. However, the marriage was refused and she was ordered to leave the UK that day (March 22). Instead, she went to the Irish Free State seeking a priest there to marry her and the man, George Drayton. No priest could be found and the Irish police ordered her to leave by April 17 under the Irish Constitution. Larsonneur still did not leave and on April 20 was taken into custody by Irish police where they were forced to deport her back from whence she had come, the UK. On arrival in the UK, she was arrested for being an 'illegal alien'. The defendant was not at fault as she did not intentionally re-enter the UK under the Alien Act; however she was still liable for the crime under Alien Act, as there was no need to prove the act was voluntary. This was also seen in the case of Winzar v Chief Constable of Kent (1983) where the defendant was admitted to hospital by a friend who was worried for his health. However when the hospital realized he was merely drunk to the point of being semi-unconscious, they discharged him from the hospital. The defendant, because of his intoxicated state, could not get home, and was liable for drunk and disorderly conduct. Even though he did not have intention for the crime, nor was he at fault, because the crime was one of state of affairs he was liable and charged as such.

=== Causation ===
There is also an issue of causation, in this the courts look at both factual causation and legal causation. Factual causation uses the 'but for' test, asking: 'but for the defendant's act, would the result still have occurred?' If it would have occurred regardless of the defendant's acts, there is no factual causation and the defendant is not guilty. Factual causation was effectively established in the legal case of Pagett [1983]. However, in the case of White [1910] the result would still have occurred 'but for' the defendant's actions, so there was no criminal liability. Legal causation uses the 'operative and substantial' test. The defendant's acts must be the 'operative and substantial' cause of the result, as seen in the case of Smith [1959].

== Mens rea element ==
The mens rea involves the different states of mind which demonstrate the relationship between degree of fault and liability. Depending on the different state of mind of the defendant at the time of committing the unlawful act, different sentences will be given.

=== Murder ===
A specific intent offense, such as murder, seen in the case of R v Vickers (1957), requires intention to cause a specific result. The mens rea of murder is the intention to kill or to cause grievous bodily harm. Intention is the most serious of states of mind the defendant can have, and this high level of fault is reflected in strict and long sentencing. Murder carries a mandatory life sentence, though the judge can impose a recommended minimum number of years as to which the defendant must serve before being eligible for release.

However, if murder is done with a specific intent in the name of a religion, ideology, etc., or to particularly vulnerable groups of people such as children, or is done so continuously (such as terrorism or serial killing) then it may be that the defendant is given a whole life tariff (never sees daylight again) to reflect his level of fault.

=== Recklessness ===
There is also subjective recklessness, such as in the case of R v Cunningham (1957), where the defendant is not required to intend the consequence to come from his actions, but the defendant realized the risk that this consequence would occur and took the risk anyway. Such a state of mind is required in most non–fatal offenses, such as

- common assault (see section 39 of the Criminal Justice Act 1988)
- The assault element of assault occasioning actual bodily harm, contrary to section 47 of the Offences against the Person Act 1861
- inflicting grievous bodily harm, contrary to section 20 of that Act.

In all of these offenses, the defendant is liable for the offense and at fault if he commits the offense intending for the damage to be done, or being subjectively reckless as to whether the damage occurs. For this recklessness is sufficient to prove fault in the defendant.

=== Gross negligence ===
The defendant can also be grossly negligent, which is the mens rea required by involuntary manslaughter offences, such as seen in the case of R v Adomako (1994), where the defendant was held to be negligent as he had "breached a duty of care".

== Defenses ==
Some defenses work by showing lack of fault through the involuntary nature of the defendant's conduct. Others, such as insanity and intoxication, work by establishing a lack of mental control or awareness on the part of the defendant. Still others, such as Duress and self–defense, operate by establishing that the defendant's conduct was justified or should be excused. Finally, the partial defenses to murder, such as loss of self-control (previously provocation), diminished responsibility, and suicide pact demonstrate a lesser degree of fault, resulting in conviction for the lesser offense of manslaughter.

=== Intoxication ===
The use of intoxication as a defense is based on whether the offense is one of basic intent or specific intent, and also whether the intoxication was voluntary or involuntary. For example, getting voluntarily intoxicated and committing actual bodily harm (a crime of basic intent) will result in the defense of intoxication failing, as getting voluntarily intoxicated is viewed as reckless by the courts, which is sufficient for basic intent offenses. Specific intent crimes demand proof of intention, and if the defendant did not form that mens rea, he cannot be guilty of the specific intent offense. However, often there is a basic intent offense as a fallback in such cases, e.g. if the defendant is charged with grievous bodily harm or wounding under s18 Offences against the Person Act 1861 but did not form the specific intent, he can be charged under s20 of that act, which has the same actus reus, but requires only intention or recklessness as to 'some harm' (making it a basic intent offense). However, there are some crimes that do not have this fallback position (e.g. theft).

=== Consent ===
The defense of consent is often only available to smaller offenses, such as Common Assault and, possibly, Actual bodily harm (S.47). The Attorney General's Reference [No. 6 of 1980] set s47 as a watershed, above which consent is unlikely to function as a defense as it is not reasonable to foresee that a person would consent to having serious harm done to them. However, cases are decided on an individual basis, and case law shows that a victim may effectively consent to even grievous bodily harm (e.g. in sport, in the case of Barnes [2004]).

== Sentencing ==
Both the type of sentence imposed, and its severity, is in large part determined by the degree of fault shown by the defendant. This can also be seen in the impact of both aggravating and mitigating factors. This is why some people are opposed to the use of minimum and mandatory sentences, as they break the relationship between the degree of fault present in the offence committed and the sentence imposed. A guilty plea can have an effect on the sentence, depending on when it is made. Making a guilty plea before the start of the trial can reduce the sentence imposed by up to one third but changing the plea to guilty once the trial has started can only reduce it by one tenth. This is because admitting fault after the trial has begun has wasted court time and money (for jury and judge etc.), so this is reflected in the sentence. Tariffs and minimum sentences also illustrate that fault is relevant to the sentencing process, whether the defendant pleads guilty or is found guilty in court.

=== Types of sentences ===
Types of sentences will also reflect level of blameworthiness:

- Custodial sentence
- Suspended sentence
- Curfew
- Extended sentence
- Community sentence
- Fine
- Conditional discharge or Absolute discharge

== Strict liability ==
There is a role for strict liability in criminal law, in relation to both regulatory offences and offences of social danger. It can be argued that the interests of society as a whole can sometimes justify the imposition of liability without fault. Nevertheless, it should be pointed out that the degree of fault still plays an important part in determining the sentence following a conviction

Conditions for strict liability

- Only actus reus needs to be established
- No blameworthiness is required on the part of the defendant
- It normally applies to regulatory offences (health and safety, minor traffic offences etc.)
- The advantages and disadvantages must be considered

Cases include

- Sweet v Parsley (1969) – where the defendant was found guilty of allowing her property to be used for cannabis smoking. Even though she had no knowledge of the offence, it was on her property so she was liable without fault. This conviction was later quashed by the House of Lords on the grounds that knowledge of the use of the premises was essential to the offence. Since she had no such knowledge, she did not commit the offence.
- Harrow London Borough Council v Shah and another (1999) - relating to the sale of a lottery ticket to a person who had not attained the age of 16 years.

=== Advantages of strict liability ===
- Many strict liability offences concern the running of a business, and if the business runs properly the actus reus will never occur. This means that many strict liability offences keep many businesses in line
- A person or company taking a risk in order to make a profit ought to be liable if the risk causes problems to others
- Certain activities must be prohibited for the public good and, so long as the penalty is not too severe, the public interest in, for example, preventing pollution outweighs the public interest in not convicting those who are without special fault
- For some offences, it would be impossible to secure a conviction if guilty knowledge had to be proved, particularly where the defendant was a company rather than an individual.
