= William Newland Welsby =

William Newland Welsby (bapt. 3 January 1802 – 1 July 1864) was a legal writer who was born in Acton, Cheshire about 1802, was the only son of William Welsby of the Middle Temple, gentleman.

He was admitted as a pensioner at St. John's College, Cambridge, on 28 October 1818, and graduated B.A. in 1823 and M.A. in 1827. On 22 April 1823 he was admitted as student at the Middle Temple, and was called to the bar on 10 November 1826. He went the North Wales and Chester circuit, and in 1841 was appointed recorder of that city. For many years he reported in the court of exchequer, and he was junior counsel to the treasury. He enjoyed the reputation of being an accomplished scholar and lawyer, but his exertions overtaxed his strength, and on 1 July 1864 he died at 19 Holland Villas Road, Kensington, aged 61. He was married, but had no children.

Welsby edited, with Roger Meeson, seventeen volumes of "Exchequer Reports", beginning with 1837, and collaborated with E. T. Hurlstone and J. Gordon in nine subsequent volumes ranging from 1849. In conjunction with John Horatio Lloyd he published in three parts "Reports of Mercantile Cases in the Courts of Common Law" in 1829 and 1830, and he edited with Edward Beavan the second edition of Chitty's "Collection of Statutes" (1851–4, 4 vols.), superintending also the third edition, which appeared in 1865, after his death. The fourth volume in the twenty-first edition of Blackstone's "Commentaries" (1844) was edited by him, and the whole set, with notes adapting it to the use of the student in America, was issued at New York in 1847. The other works published under his editorship comprised J. F. Archbold's "Summary of the Law on Pleading and Evidence in Criminal Cases" (10th edit. 1846, 15th edit. 1862); Dr. Joseph Bateman's "General Turnpike Road Acts" (1854), and his "General Highway Acts" (1863); Sir John Jervis' "Treatise on Office of Coroners" (1854, reissued by C. W. Lovesy in 1866); Sir Christopher Rawlinson's "Municipal Corporation Act" (2nd, 3rd and 4th edit. 1850, 1856, and 1863); and he revised the second edition of Sir W. H. Watson's "Treatise on the Office of Sheriff" (2nd edit, 1848). Welsby also edited a volume containing sixteen admirable Lives of Eminent English Judges of the Seventeenth and Eighteenth Centuries, which originally came out in the Law Magazine; nine of them were from his pen.
