= Archbold Criminal Pleading, Evidence and Practice =

Manual of procedure for criminal lawyers in England and Wales

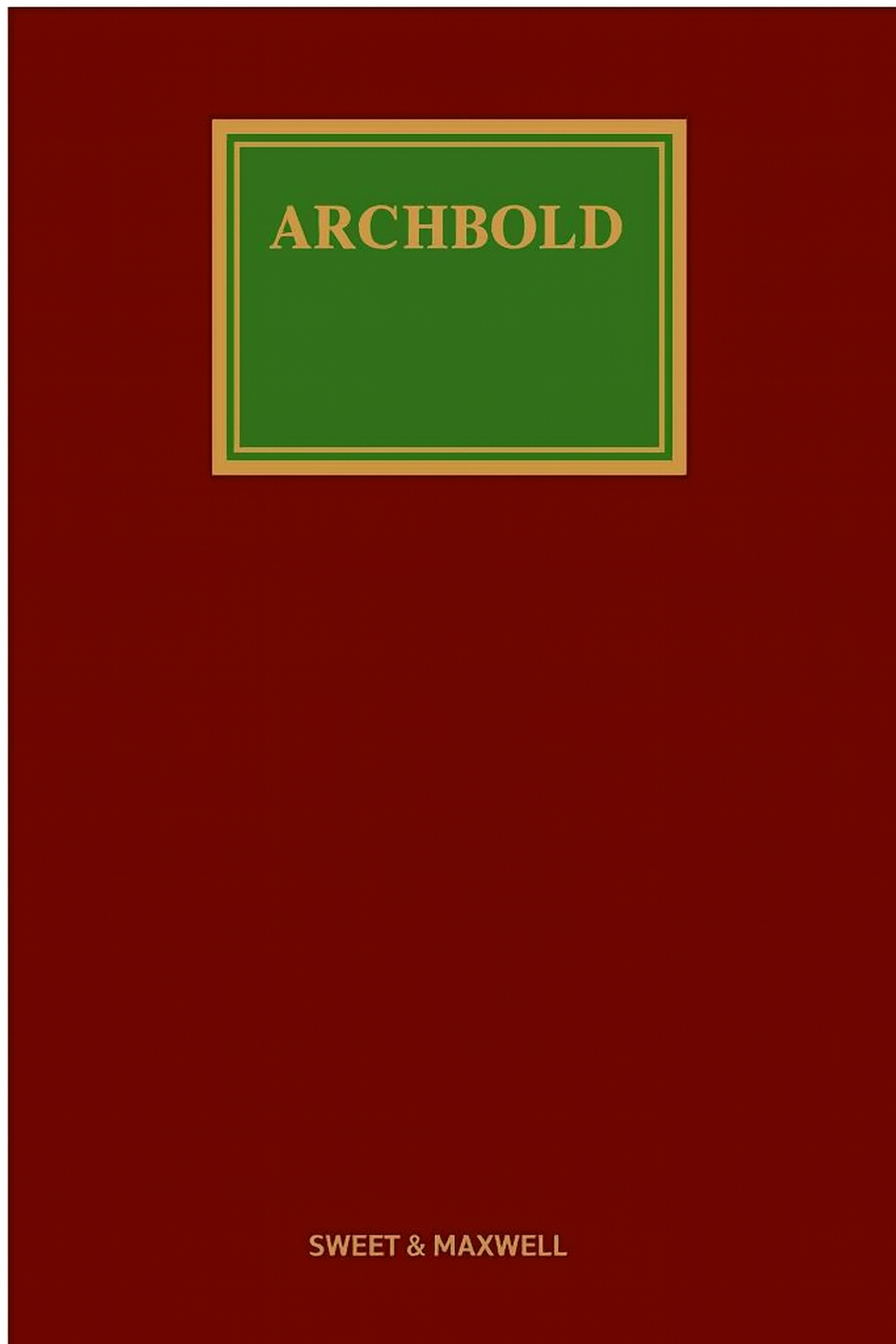
Cover

Archbold Criminal Pleading, Evidence and Practice (usually called simply Archbold) is a leading practitioners' text book for the practice of criminal law in the Crown Court of England and Wales. It is also referred to and used in several other common law jurisdictions around the world.

Archbold has been in publication since 1822, when it was first written by John Frederick Archbold. It is currently published by Sweet & Maxwell, a subsidiary of Thomson Reuters. Forty-three revisions were published prior to 1992 and since then it has been published annually. Its authority is such that it is often quoted in court.

The team of authors is made up of experienced solicitors, barristers, King's Counsel and judges.

== Editors and editions ==
| Editors | Editions | Dates |
|---|---|---|
| J. F. Archbold | 1st – 3rd eds | 1822–1829 |
| John Jervis | 4th – 9th eds | 1831–1843 |
| William Newland Welsby | 10th – 15th eds | 1846–1862 |
| W. Bruce | 16th – 21st eds | 1867–1893 |
| W. F. Craies; G. Stephenson | 22nd – 23rd eds | 1900–1905 |
| W. F. Craies; H. D. Roome | 24th ed. | 1910 |
| H. D. Roome; R. E. Ross | 25th – 27th eds | 1918–1927 |
| R. E. Ross; T. R. F. Butler | 28th – 29th eds | 1931–1934 |
| R. E. Ross; M. Turner | 30th ed. | 1938 |
| T. R. F. Butler; M. Garsia | 31st – 37th eds | 1943–1969 |
| T. R. F. Butler; S. G. Mitchell | 38th ed. | 1973 |
| S. G. Mitchell (editor); J. H. Buzzard (consultant editor); T. R. F. Butler (consultant editor) | 39th ed. | 1976 |
| S. G. Mitchell (editor); J. H. Buzzard (consultant editor) | 40th ed. | 1979 |
| S. G. Mitchell (editor); J. H. Buzzard (consultant editor); P. J. Richardson (assistant editor) | 41st ed. | 1982 |
| S. G. Mitchell (editor); P. J. Richardson (editor); J. H. Buzzard (consultant editor) | 42nd ed | 1985 |
| S. G. Mitchell (editor); P. J. Richardson (editor); D. A. Thomas (sentencing editor) | 43rd ed. | 1988 |
| P. J. Richardson (editor); S. G. Mitchell (consultant editor); D. A. Thomas (sentencing editor) and a team of practitioner editors | | 1992 |
| P. J. Richardson (editor); D. A. Thomas (sentencing editor) and a team of practitioner editors | | 1993–2007 |
| P. J. Richardson (editor) and a team of practitioner editors | | 2008–2018 |
| M. Lucraft (editor) and a team of practitioner editors | | 2019– |

== Related publications ==
A separate work, Archbold Magistrates' Courts Criminal Practice (usually called simply Archbold Magistrates) covers the criminal jurisdiction of magistrates' courts and youth courts of England and Wales. It also provides coverage of a number of civil orders which complement the criminal jurisdiction of those courts. As of 2025, Archbold Magistrates is in its 21st edition.

A further work, Archbold: International Criminal Courts covers the practice, procedure and rules of evidence applicable to international criminal tribunals, including the International Criminal Court. The fifth and most recent edition of this work was published in 2018.

== See also ==
- Bibliography of English criminal law
- Blackstone's Criminal Practice
