= David Arthur Thomas =

British legal scholar and leading authority on sentencing (1938–2013)

David. A. Thomas QC (Hon)
- Born: 17 October 1938; Liverpool, England
- Died: 30 September 2013 (aged 74)
- Education: Queens' College, Cambridge
- Occupations: Legal scholar, Barrister (Lincoln's Inn)
- Organization: Trinity Hall, University of Cambridge

David A. Thomas (17 October 1938 – 30 September 2013) was a British legal scholar, fee-paid judge, and leading authority on sentencing in England and Wales. Educated at Queens’ College, Cambridge, he taught at the LSE before joining the Cambridge Institute of Criminology, where he became Reader and a Fellow of Trinity Hall. He authored Principles of Sentencing, curated and maintained the loose-leaf reference Current Sentencing Practice and the annual Sentencing Referencer, developed the Criminal Appeal Reports (Sentencing), and edited the sentencing digest of the Criminal Law Review. His systematic collation of sentencing decisions and statutes established the analytical framework that shaped modern sentencing practice in England and Wales.

== Early life and education ==
David Arthur Thomas was born on 17 October 1938 in Liverpool. He attended the Liverpool Institute grammar school and went up to Queens’ College, Cambridge, in 1957, initially to read English before transferring to Law. He graduated with a BA (1960) and an LLB (1961).

== Academic and professional career ==
Thomas began as a lecturer in law at the London School of Economics (1961–1971). In 1971 he joined the Cambridge Institute of Criminology as Assistant Director of Research, later becoming University Lecturer and Fellow of Trinity Hall. He was awarded an LLD and retired as Reader in Criminology in 2003.

He was called to the bar by Lincoln's Inn later in his professional life in 1992, appointed Queen's Counsel (honoris causa) in 1996, and he served as a Recorder of the Crown Court.

== Major works and publications ==
Thomas’s scholarship defined sentencing law and practice in late-twentieth-century England and Wales.

=== Books ===
- Thomas, David A. (1970, 1979). Principles of Sentencing: The Sentencing Policy of the Court of Appeal, Criminal Division. London: Heinemann. (1st, 2nd edns).
- Thomas, David A. (1980). Current Sentencing Practice. London: Sweet & Maxwell. ISBN 9780421257405.
- Thomas, David A. (1984). Sentencing and Penal Policy. Cambridge: Cambridge University Press.
- Thomas, David A. (1987). Criminal Law: Cases and Materials on Sentencing. Cambridge: Cambridge University Press.

=== Selected articles ===
- Thomas, D A (1973). "Sentencing in the Crown Court". Criminal Law Review: 695–708.
- Thomas, D A (1976). "The Totality Principle in Sentencing". Criminal Law Review: 40–46.
- Thomas, D A (1977). "Crown Court Sentencing Survey 1968–1974". Criminal Law Review: 310–322.
- Thomas, D A (1979). "Appellate Control of Sentencing". Cambridge Law Journal. 38: 44–68.
- Thomas, D A (1989). "Confiscation Orders and the Criminal Justice Act 1988". Criminal Law Review: 741–752.
- Thomas, D A (1990). "The Effect of Guilty Pleas on Sentence". Criminal Law Review: 49–56.
- Thomas, D A (1993). "Guideline Judgments and Judicial Discretion". Criminal Law Review: 189–200.
- Thomas, D A (1999). "Sentencing in the Age of Guidelines". Criminal Law Review: 575–589.
- Thomas, D A (2002). "The Sentencing Code and Appellate Review". Criminal Law Review: 641–655.

=== Editorial ===
- From 1978 to 2008, Thomas edited the Sentencing Digest in the Criminal Law Review, cataloguing every sentencing decision of the Court of Appeal (Criminal Division).
- From 1988, he was a contributing editor to Archbold Criminal Pleading, Evidence and Practice

== Influence and legacy ==
Thomas's exposition of the legal principles to be derived from pre-1970 sentencing decisions of the Court of Appeal in Principles of Sentencing was described as being akin to finding the Abominable Snowman. His analyses of proportionality and the totality principle were later cited by the Court of Appeal. He was central to judicial training through the Judicial Studies Board, helping to establish guideline-based sentencing. The Guardian and The Times described him as "the country’s pre-eminent authority on sentencing" and "a quiet revolutionary" who rationalised modern sentencing.
