= Tilly of Bloomsbury (1931 film) =

1931 film

- Directed by: Jack Raymond
- Written by: W. P. Lipscomb
- Based on: Tilly of Bloomsbury by Ian Hay
- Produced by: Jack Raymond
- Starring: Sydney Howard; Phyllis Konstam; Richard Bird; Edward Chapman
- Cinematography: Freddie Young
- Edited by: Thorold Dickinson
- Production company: Sterling Films
- Distributed by: Sterling Films
- Release date: 29 April 1931
- Running time: 70 minutes
- Country: United Kingdom
- Language: English

Tilly of Bloomsbury is a 1931 British comedy film directed by Jack Raymond and starring Sydney Howard, Phyllis Konstam, Richard Bird and Edward Chapman. It is based on the play Tilly of Bloomsbury by Ian Hay, previously adapted into a 1921 silent film of the same title It was shot at the Elstree Studios outside London. The film's sets were designed by the art director Clifford Pember. The screenplay concerns a woman who falls in love with an aristocrat.

== Premise ==
A young woman falls in love with an aristocrat and tries to convince his parents that she is herself wealthy.

== Cast ==
- Sydney Howard as Samuel Stillbottle
- Phyllis Konstam as Tilly Welwyn
- Richard Bird as Dick Mainwaring
- Edward Chapman as Percy Welwyn
- Ellie Jeffreys as Lady Marion Mainwaring
- Marie Wright as Mrs. Banks
- Mabel Russell as Mrs. Welwyn
- H. R. Hignett as Lucius Welwyn
- Ena Grossmith as Amelia Welwyn
- Sebastian Smith as Abel Mainwaring
- Leila Page as Sylvia
- Olwen Roose as Constance Damery
- T. Gordon Blythe as Metha Ram

== Bibliography ==
- Low, Rachael. Filmmaking in 1930s Britain. George Allen & Unwin, 1985.
- Wood, Linda. British Films, 1927-1939. British Film Institute, 1986.
