= John Frederick Archbold =

English lawyer and writer (1785–1870)

John Frederick Archbold (1785–1870) was a barrister and legal writer. He was the first editor of the English criminal law textbook Archbold Criminal Pleading, Evidence and Practice, which is still routinely used in court today.

== Life ==
He was the second son of John Archbold of County Dublin. He was admitted a student of Lincoln's Inn on 3 May 1809, and was called to the bar on 5 May 1814. From the beginning of his career Archbold devoted himself to compiling legal treatises. In 1811 he brought out an annotated edition of Blackstone's "Commentaries" (London, 4 vols. 8vo), with an analysis and an epitome of the work. In 1813, he issued the first volume of "A Digest of Pleas of the Crown" (London, 8vo), a compilation of all the statutes, adjudged cases, and other authorities upon the subject. This was one of three volumes of "A Digest of Criminal Law", which Archbold had prepared for the press, but as several books on the subject appeared about the same time he did not issue the other two volumes.

In 1819, he published the first edition of what was perhaps his most notable work, "The Practice of the Court of King's Bench in Personal Actions and Ejectments" (London, 2 vols. 12mo). Previous to its appearance, "The Practice of the Court of King's Bench in Personal Actions" by William Tidd, was the leading work on the subject; but, while it maintained its place in the United States, it was largely superseded in England by Archbold's book, which was more explicit in regard to forms of procedure. Archbold's "Practice" went through fourteen editions. The third edition was edited by Thomas Chitty, who added to it the "Practice of the Courts of Common Pleas and Exchequer", and the ninth edition, which appeared in 1855–6, was edited by Samuel Prentice. The fourteenth edition, published in 1885, was revised by Thomas Willes Chitty and John William St. Lawrence Leslie.

About 1824, Archbold published his "Summary of the Law relative to Pleading and Evidence in Criminal Cases", in which he incorporated the greater part of the two unpublished volumes of his "Digest of Criminal Law". The fourth (1831) and four succeeding editions were edited by (Sir) John Jervis, the tenth (1846) to the fifteenth (1862) by William Newland Welsby, and the sixteenth (1867) to the twenty-first (1893) by William Bruce. The twenty-second edition, by William Feilden Craies and Guy Stephenson, appeared in 1900. The work has gone through a number of editions in the United States.

In 1829, Archbold published a work upon the "Practice of the Court of Common Pleas". Afterwards the practice of all courts of common law at Westminster was assimilated and much altered by the statutes and new rules of law on the subject between 1831 and 1834. To meet the altered conditions he published his "New Practice of Attornies in the Courts of Law at Westminster", which appeared in 1838, was remodelled in 1844, and reached a third edition in 1846-7 (London, 2 vols. 8vo). On the passage of the Common Law Procedure Act 1852, he prepared "The New Rules of Practice in the Courts of Law" (London, 1853, 8vo), and "The New Practice, Pleadings, and Evidence in the Courts of Common Law at Westminster" (London, 1853, 12mo), which received a supplement in 1854, and attained a second edition in 1855 (London, 8vo).

Archbold's treatises on parish law were among his most important elucidations of English law. In 1828, he published "The Law relative to the Commitments and Convictions by Justices of the Peace" (London, 12mo). This was the foundation of his "Justice of the Peace and Parish Officer" (London, 1840, 3 vols. 12mo), a work intended as a practical guide for county magistrates. The similar treatise by Richard Burn had become, through the editions of successive editors, rather a work of reference for lawyers than a guide for magistrates. A seventh edition of Archbold's work by James Paterson appeared in 1876 (London, 2 vols. 8vo). The third volume of the original edition, which dealt with "The Poor Law", was in especial demand, and developed into a separate treatise, which was still a standard authority on the subject in 1901; the twelfth (1873), thirteenth (1878), and fourteenth (1885) editions of the volume on "The Poor Law" were prepared by William Cunningham Glen, and the fifteenth (1898) by James Brooks Little. Archbold's last contribution to parish law was "The Parish Officer" (London, 1852, 12mo); a second edition by Glen appeared in 1855. With the fourth edition (1864) the editor, James Paterson, incorporated Shaw's "Parish Law", by Joseph Shaw. The eighth edition by John Theodore Dodd, appeared in 1895.

Archbold died on 28 November 1870, at 15 Gloucester Street, Regent's Park, London. He is said to have been known as "pretty Archbold" (cf. An Appeal to the People of the United Kingdom of Great Britain and Ireland from James Wharton, York, 1836).

== Works ==
Besides the works already mentioned, he was the author of:

- A Digest of the Law relative to Pleading and Evidence in Actions, Real, Personal, and Mixed, London, 1821, 12mo; 2nd edit. 1837.
- The Law and Practice in Bankruptcy, 2nd edit. by John Flather, London, 1827, 12mo; 11th edit. by Flather, 1856.
- The Jurisdiction and Practice of the Court of the Court of Quarter Sessions, London, 1836, 12mo; 3rd edit. by Conway Whitehorne Lovesy, 1869; 4th edit. by Frederick Mead and Herbert Stephen Croft, 1885, 8vo; 5th edit. by Sir George Sherston Baker, 1898, 8vo.
- The Law of Nisi Prius, London, 1843–5, 2 vols. 8vo; vol. i. 2nd edit. 1845, 12mo; 3rd American edition by John K. Findlay, 1853.
- The Practice of the Crown Office of the Court of Queen's Bench, London, 1844, 12mo.
- The Law of Landlord and Tenant, London, 1846, 12mo; 3rd edit. 1864.
- The Law relating to Examinations and Grounds of Appeal in Cases of Orders of Removal, London, 1847, 12mo; 2nd edit. 1858.
- The Practice of the New County Courts, London, 1847, 12mo; 9th edit. by John Vesey Vesey Fitzgerald, 1885, 8vo; 10th edit. by Charles Arnold White, 1889.
- A Summary of the Laws of England in four Volumes, London, 1848–9, 12mo; only vols. i. and ii. appeared.
- The Law relative to Pauper Lunatics, London, 1851, 12mo; afterwards included in his "Poor Law".
- The New Rules and Forms regulating the present Practice and Proceedings of the County Courts, London, 1851, 12mo.
- The New Statutes relating to Lunacy, London, 1854, 12mo; 2nd edit. by W. C. Glen and Alexander Glen, 1877, 8vo; 4th edit. by Sydney George Lushington, 1895.
- The Law of Limited Liability, Partnership, and Joint Stock Companies, London, 1855, 12mo; 3rd edit. 1857.
- The Law and Practice of Arbitration and Award, London, 1861, 12mo.
- The Law of Bankruptcy and Insolvency as founded on the recent Statute, London, 1861, 12mo; 2nd edit. 1861.

Archbold also edited and annotated editions of numerous Acts of Parliament.
