= The Skin Game (1921 film) =

1921 film

- Directed by: B. E. Doxat-Pratt
- Written by: B. E. Doxat-Pratt; John Galsworthy
- Produced by: Maurits Binger
- Production company: Anglo-Hollandia
- Release date: 7 January 1921
- Countries: United Kingdom; Netherlands
- Language: Silent

The Skin Game (Dutch: Hard tegen hard) is a 1921 British-Dutch silent drama film adapted from the 1920 play by John Galsworthy and directed by B. E. Doxat-Pratt.

Edmund Gwenn and Helen Haye later reprised their respective roles as Mr. Hornblower and Mrs. Hillcrist in the 1931 sound version directed by Alfred Hitchcock.

== Cast ==
- Edmund Gwenn - Hornblower
- Mary Clare - Chloe Hornblower
- Helen Haye - Mrs. Hillcrist
- Dawson Milward - Mr. Hillcrist
- Malcolm Keen - Charles Hillcrist
- Meggie Albanesi - Jill Hillcrist
- Frederick Cooper - Rolf Hornblower
- Ivor Barnard - Dawker
- Muriel Alexander - Anna
- James Dodd - Jackman
- John H. Roberts - Auctioneer
- Blanche Stanley - Mrs. Jackman
- Howard Cochran
- Marston Garsia - Hillcrist's Butler
- Jack Hobbs
- Charles Trevor - A Stranger
