= Thomas Chitty (lawyer) =

English lawyer and writer (1802–1878)

Thomas Chitty (1802 – 13 February 1878) was an English lawyer and legal writer, who was pupil master to a generation of eminent lawyers and played a significant role in documenting the legal reforms of the 19th century.

== Early life ==
Thomas was the third son of Joseph Chitty and his wife, Elizabeth née Woodward. He was never called to the bar but began to practise as a special pleader in 1820 at the early age of nineteen.

== Legal practice ==
Chitty practised at 1 King's Bench Walk where he educated a generation of eminent pupils including:

- Hugh Cairns, a future Lord Chancellor;
- Farrer Herschell, another;
- James Whiteside, a future Chief Justice of Ireland;
- William Shee;

– and sundry future judges and politicians.

The practice of special pleader demanded mastery of detail and the technical intricacies of the law and Chitty's career spanned huge changes from the Common Law Procedure Acts 1852-4 to the Judicature Acts 1873-5, reforms that changed the ancient regime of forms of action into, essentially, the modern system. Chitty exploited the opportunity in publishing a number of practitioners' texts including preparing new editions of:

- John Frederick Archbold's The Practice of the Court of King's Bench in Personal Actions and Ejectments, despite Archbold's objections;
- His father's Treatise on the Parties to Actions;
- Richard Burn's Justice of the Peace (1845);

– and publishing several works in his own right including Forms of Practical Proceedings (1834). His grandson T. Willes Chitty edited the 11th edition in 1879.

== Family, personality and death ==
"Chitty was known as a kind and genial man, a keen whist player and musician, and an energetic volunteer." He retired in 1877, and died at home in London.

In 1826, he had married Eliza née Cawston, and the couple had two sons who followed in their father's legal footsteps:

- Thomas Edward Chitty (1826/7-1868), clerk to the Bristol assizes; and
- Joseph William Chitty, became a judge in 1881, a notable Liberal politician.

== Bibliography ==
- Obituaries:
  - Annual Register (1878), 136
  - Solicitors' Journal, 23 (1877–78), 329
  - Law Journal, 23 Feb 1878, 131–2; 2 March 1878, 148

== Sources ==
- Hamilton, John Andrew (1887). "Chitty, Thomas" . In Stephen, Leslie (ed.). Dictionary of National Biography. Vol. 10. London: Smith, Elder & Co.
- Hamilton, J. A. (2004) "Chitty, Thomas (1802–1878)", rev. Michael Lobban, Oxford Dictionary of National Biography, Oxford University Press, accessed 9 August 2007 (subscription, Wikipedia Library access or UK public library membership required)
- Simpson, A. W. B. (ed.) (1984). Biographical Dictionary of the Common Law. London: Butterworths. ISBN 0-406-51657-X.
