= John Hastings Turner =

English novelist, dramatist and theatre director (1892–1956)

- Born: 16 December 1892; England
- Died: 29 February 1956 (aged 63); Norfolk
- Occupations: Novelist, dramatist/playwright, theatre and film director
- Spouse: Laura Cowie

John Hastings Turner (16 December 1891 – 29 February 1956), frequently referred to as Hastings Turner or J. Hastings Turner, was an English novelist, dramatist and theatre director. His works performed on stage and in film in Britain and the United States from the 1920s to the 1940s.

== Biography ==
Turner was born in Kensington, London on 16 December 1891, the second child and eldest son of Augustus Turner, a solicitor, and his wife Annie, née Hockley. A younger brother was Maxwell Turner, later a leading barrister. Turner was educated at Rugby School and St John's College, Oxford.

He turned to writing early in life: two of his plays were produced before he reached the age of 22, and during the First World War, in which he fought, Lena Ashwell appeared in his Iris Intervenes, which she staged at short notice in 1915 so that the author could see it before rejoining his regiment – the Middlesex – in France. He was invalided out of the Army in 1916 and resumed his theatrical career.

Turner married the film actress, Laura Cowie, on 20 June 1918. They later settled in Blue Tiles Farm near Fakenham, Norfolk, which remained his home for the rest of his life. They had one child, a daughter.

An early published novel of his from 1919, Simple Souls, was made into a film in 1920 with a scenario by Fred Myton, directed by Robert Thornby. In 1926, Turner's play The Scarlet Lady, a comedy, opened at the Criterion Theatre in London, starring Marie Tempest, a friend and the driving force behind the establishment of the actors' union Equity. Supporting Tempest was an ingénue, Fabia Drake, who became Tempest's confidante and then Turner's sister-in-law through marriage to his brother Maxwell.

Thereafter, in addition to his solo work, Turner collaborated with other writers, including Frederick Lonsdale and Roland Pertwee, with the latter of whom he wrote plays, scenarios or dialogues for a number of productions in the early 1930s, including a series of films directed by John Daumery and William C. McGann, and Irving Asher's now-lost 1935 UK production Murder at Monte Carlo directed by Michael Barringer and starring Errol Flynn in his first major role. Turner's work was performed by other leading actors including Margot Grahame (A Letter of Warning, 1932), Nora Swinburne (A Voice Said Goodnight, 1932), Cedric Hardwicke, Boris Karloff and Ralph Richardson (The Ghoul, 1933), and Jane Baxter (The Night of the Party, 1935), directed by Michael Powell.

From the late 1930s Turner did some writing – and Cowie occasional acting – for productions by The Rank Organisation, which had bought film studios like Gaumont-British that Turner had previously worked for.

Turner retired from writing for the theatre after the Second World War. He died at his home in Norfolk in 1956, at the age of 63.

== Theatre works ==
- Account Rendered, 1913
- Havoc, 1913
- Iris Intervenes, 1915
- Nothing New, 1916
- Bubbly, 1917
- A Breath of Fresh Air, 1917
- Tails Up, 1918
- Hullo, America, 1918
- Ladies and Gentlemen, 1919
- Back Again, 1919
- Everywoman's Privilege, 1920
- The Naughty Princess (from the French), 1920
- Jumble Sale, 1920
- Now and Then, 1921
- Fun of the Fayre, 1921
- Mayfair and Montmartre, 1922
- The Lilies of the Field, 1923
- His Queen, 1925
- The Sea Urchin, 1925
- Cleopatra (from the German), 1925
- Betty in Mayfair (adapted from The Lilies of the Field), 1925
- Merely Molly, 1926
- The Scarlet Ladv, 1926
- The Spot on the Sun, 1927
- Lady Mary (with Frederick Lonsdale), 1928
- The Lord of the Manor, 1928
- Wake Up and Dream, 1929
- To Account Rendered, 1931
- Punchinello, 1932
- This Inconstancy (with Roland Pertwee), 1933
- For the Defence (There Go All of Us), 1934
- Follow the Sun (with Ronald Jeans), 1935
- Venus in Silk (with Graham John), 1937
- Mother's Gone A-Hunting (1938)

Source: Who's Who in the Theatre.

As a director, Turner staged Honours Easy, It's a Pity About Humanity, 1930, The Man Who Pays the Piper, 1931, Punchinello, 1932, Once a Husband, 1932, This Inconstancy, 1933 and Laughter in Court, 1938.

== Sources ==
- Parker, John, ed. (1947). Who's Who in the Theatre (tenth ed.). London: Sir Isaac Pitman and Sons. OCLC 473894893.
