= The Skin Game (1931 film) =

1931 British film

- Theatrical poster
- Directed by: Alfred Hitchcock
- Written by: Alfred Hitchcock (adaptation); Alma Reville (scenario)
- Based on: The Skin Game by John Galsworthy
- Produced by: John Maxwell
- Starring: Edmund Gwenn; Helen Haye; C. V. France; Jill Esmond; John Longden; Phyllis Konstam
- Cinematography: Jack E. Cox
- Edited by: A.R. Gobbett; Rene Marrison
- Production company: British International Pictures
- Distributed by: Wardour Films Ltd.
- Release date: 26 February 1931
- Running time: 82 minutes
- Country: United Kingdom
- Language: English

The Skin Game is a 1931 British drama film by Alfred Hitchcock, based on the 1920 play by John Galsworthy and produced by British International Pictures.

The plot concerns a feud between the long-established (upper class) Hillcrists, played by C.V. France, Helen Haye, and Jill Esmond, and the nouveau riche (formerly working class) Hornblowers, played by Edmund Gwenn, John Longden, Phyllis Konstam, and Frank Lawton. Underlying themes in the story include class warfare and the results of avarice.

Edmund Gwenn and Helen Haye reprised their respective roles as Mr. Hornblower and Mrs. Hillcrist from the 1921 silent version.

== Plot ==
For his love of riches, Mr. Hornblower coldly enjoys a "skin game" of buying up land under false pretenses of letting the tenant farmers remain and then booting them out, in order to build factories. The Hillcrists learn of this and regret selling some land to him; in turn Hornblower considers them snobs, and taunts them with his plans to buy the picturesque countryside adjoining their rural estate which is due to be auctioned off. Visions of factories spewing smoke where a magnificent landscape has been maturing for several generations torment the Hillcrists.

At the auction, the Hillcrists are outbid, then learn it was by Hornblower's agent. But Hillcrist employee Dawker learns a dark secret about the past life of Hornblower's now pregnant daughter-in-law Chloe, wife of Charles Hornblower. The Hillcrists confront Chloe and elder Hornblower together, and prove their case with witnesses. They are prepared to use the information, unless Hornblower agrees to deed the land to them. Reluctantly he agrees, making them swear to silence on a Bible. But now, townspeople are already gossiping and Charles has become suspicious. Chloe, terrified that this secret threatens her marriage, goes to the Hillcrist home to beg them to make up a story to tell Charles.

At that point, Charles is announced and Chloe jumps behind a curtain. Charles has already beaten the secret out of Dawker, and declares that he intends to end his marriage. Off-camera, Chloe had left through a door behind the curtain, and in short order, had drowned herself. Mrs. Hillcrist, although upset with Dawker for breaking the vow of silence, pulls the property deed out of the desk and gives it to him for safekeeping ... he puts it in his outer pocket, clearly visible. The elder Hornblower then arrives in a fury and wrestles the deed from Dawker.

Chloe's body is brought in. Hornblower rages that Hillcrist has destroyed him and his family completely, and he will exact revenge. A last brief, poignant scene shows a prominent large tree on the land behind the Hillcrist house being felled by a work crew using a two-man saw.

== Cast ==
- C. V. France as Jack Hillcrist – the Hillcrists
- Helen Haye as Ivy Hillcrist – the Hillcrists
- Jill Esmond as Jill – the Hillcrists
- Edmund Gwenn as Mr Hornblower – the Hornblowers
- John Longden as Charles – the Hornblowers
- Phyllis Konstam as Chloe – the Hornblowers
- Frank Lawton as Rolf – the Hornblowers
- Herbert Ross as the Jackmans
- Dora Gregory as the Jackmans
- Edward Chapman as Dawker
- R.E. Jeffrey as First Stranger
- George Bancroft as Second Stranger
- Ronald Frankau as Auctioneer

== Copyright status and home media ==
The Skin Game is copyrighted worldwide but has been heavily bootlegged on home video. Despite this, various licensed, restored releases have appeared on DVD, Blu-ray, and video on demand services from Optimum in the UK, Lionsgate and Kino Lorber in the US, and many others.

== Reception ==
On Rotten Tomatoes, the film has an aggregated score of 38% based on 3 positive and 5 negative critic reviews.
