= Honour in Pawn =

1916 film by Harold Weston

Honour in Pawn is a 1916 British silent film which starred Helen Haye in her first film role.

The four-reel crime drama was based on the 1911 novel of the same name by W. B. Maxwell to a script by Harold Weston, who was also the Director. The production company was Broadwest Film Company while the Producer was Walter West.

== Synopsis ==
A crooked dealer adopts a young woman thief and forces her to steal the plate of a knight.

== Cast ==
- Nancy Raeborn - Manora Thew
- Sir Roger Singleton - Julian Royce
- Harvey Denman - George Bellamy
- Giovanni Leraca - Ivan Berlyn
- Mrs Fortescue - Helen Haye
- Uncredited - Hetta Bartlett
- Uncredited - Marjorie Compton
