= Joseph Shaw (legal writer) =

Joseph Shaw FRS (1671–1733) was an English legal writer.

== Life ==
He was the son of John Shaw of London. He matriculated from Trinity College, Oxford, on 10 June 1687, and in 1695, he entered the Middle Temple. About 1700 he made a tour through Holland, Flanders, and part of France, and embodied his observations in a series of letters to Anthony Ashley Cooper, third earl of Shaftesbury, whose friendship and patronage he enjoyed. The letters were published in 1709. They contain details on those countries during the interval of peace which followed the Treaty of Ryswick. He was elected a Fellow of the Royal Society in 1703.

In later life Shaw settled at Epsom in Surrey, and devoted himself to legal study. In 1728 he published The Practical Justice of the Peace, which attained its sixth edition in 1756. Shortly before his death he published a companion volume entitled Parish Law, dedicated to his personal friend, Sir John Fortescue Aland, justice of common pleas, which remained a standard work on the subject. In the 19th century it was published with J. F. Archbold's Parish Officer. The last edition was published in 1895. In Nobell v Durell (1789) 3 T.R 271 Lord Kenyon, chief justice of the Court of Kings Bench, in response to a reference to Shaw by counsel, observed 'that Shaw was but an ordinary writer', at p. 271 note(c). Presumably he was contrasting him with those writers who were recognised by the courts as authoritative sources of the law, for example, William Blackstone or Richard Burn.

Shaw died at Clapham on 24 October 1733, leaving a son Joseph, who later lived at Epsom.
