= Tilly of Bloomsbury (1940 film) =

- Directed by: Leslie S. Hiscott
- Written by: Nils Holstius; Jack Marks
- Based on: play Tilly of Bloomsbury by Ian Hay
- Produced by: A. Barr-Smith; Kurt Sternberg
- Starring: Sydney Howard; Jean Gillie; Michael Wilding
- Cinematography: Bernard Browne
- Production company: Hammersmith Productions
- Distributed by: RKO Radio Pictures (UK)
- Release date: 24 August 1940 (UK)
- Running time: 83 minutes
- Country: United Kingdom
- Language: English

Tilly of Bloomsbury is a 1940 British comedy film directed by Leslie S. Hiscot and starring Sydney Howard, Jean Gillie, Kathleen Harrison and Henry Oscar. It was based on the play Tilly of Bloomsbury by Ian Hay. The screenplay concerns a young woman who falls in love with an aristocrat, and attempts to convince his family that she is of their social class.

== Plot summary ==
The rich and wealthy aristocrat socialité bachelor Dick Mainwaring falls in love with a beautiful woman from a lower class, Tilly Welwyn, whose mother owns a boarding house. Their backgrounds give rise to problems. Dick is discouraged and behaves like a complete snob towards the hard working mother, but then he learns of the good side of their life. Dick brings Tilly to his family's mansion in the country over the weekend. The visit starts out badly, since his mother, Lady Marion, strongly disapproves with the couple's union. The mother tries to split the couple up, but they are aided by the cunning butler, Samuel Stillbottle. Ultimately their love grows stronger as they overcome their differences, and romance pull the longer straw in the end.

== Cast ==
- Sydney Howard as Samuel Stillbottle
- Jean Gillie as Tilly Welwyn
- Henry Oscar as Lucius Welwyn
- Athene Seyler as Mrs. Banks
- Michael Wilding as Percy Welwyn
- Kathleen Harrison as Mrs. Welwyn
- Athole Stewart as Abel Mainwaring
- Michael Denison as Dick Mainwaring
- Martita Hunt as Lady Marion Mainwaring
- Joy Frankau as Amelia Mainwaring
- Eve Shelley as Diana
