= Stephen Mitchell (judge) =

English barrister and judge (born 1941)

Sir Stephen George Mitchell (born 19 September 1941), styled The Hon. Mr Justice Mitchell, is a former judge of the High Court of England and Wales assigned to the Queen's Bench Division.

== Biography ==
Mitchell was born in Nottingham, Nottinghamshire, the son of Sydney Mitchell and Joan Dick. He was educated at Bedford School and at Hertford College, Oxford. He was called to the Bar in 1964 and became a member of the Middle Temple.

He was appointed as Second Prosecuting Counsel to the Crown at the Inner London Crown Court in 1975, and a Junior Prosecuting Counsel to the Crown at the Central Criminal Court in 1977. He was a Senior Prosecuting Counsel to the Crown between 1981 and 1986, a Recorder between 1985 and 1989, and a Circuit Judge between 1989 and 1993. He was appointed as Queen's Counsel in 1986 and as a Bencher of the Middle Temple in 1993. He was a Judge of the High Court of Justice, Queen's Bench Division between 1993 and 2003, and President of the National Security Appeals Panel, Information Tribunal between 2004 and 2007.

== Publications ==
- Editor of Phipson on Evidence, 11th edition, 1970,
- Editor of Archbold Criminal Pleading, Evidence and Practice, 1971–1988,
- Author of The Marks on Chelsea-Derby and Early Crossed-Batons Useful Wares, 1770–c1790, 2007.
