= Tilly of Bloomsbury (play) =

Tilly of Bloomsbury is a 1919 British comedic play written by Ian Hay. It is heavily influenced by the story of Cinderella and concerns a young woman from Bloomsbury in London, Tilly Wellwyn who falls in love with a wealthy aristocrat. Despite her poor background, she tries to pretend she is also from a noble background - attempting to fool his family also. She succeeds in this at first, but her attempts to make her own family pretend to be upper-class ultimately leads to the exposure of her ploy.

The play was adapted as a film three times in 1921 by Rex Wilson, 1931 by Jack Raymond and 1940 by Leslie S. Hiscott.
