= Edmund Gwenn =

English actor (1877–1959)

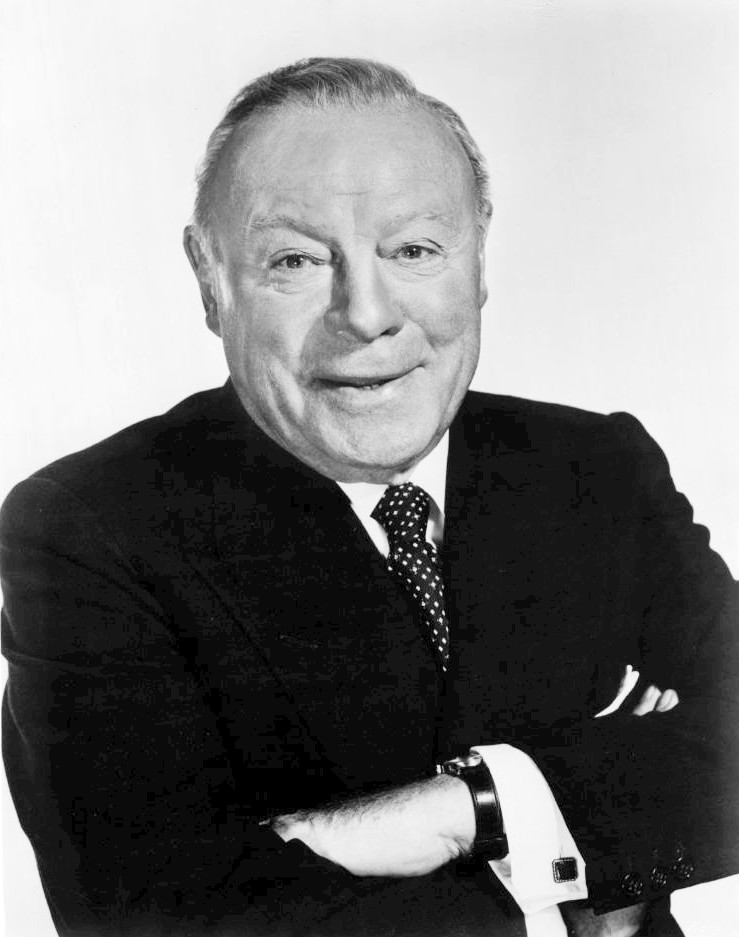
- Gwenn in 1953
- Born: Edmund John Kellaway; 26 September 1877; Wandsworth, London, England
- Died: 6 September 1959 (aged 81); Woodland Hills, California, U.S.
- Resting place: Hollywood Forever Cemetery
- Education: St. Olave's School; King's College London
- Occupation: Actor
- Years active: 1895–1959
- Spouse(s): Minnie Terry (m. 1901–c. 1916)
- Family: Arthur Chesney (brother); Cecil Kellaway (cousin)
- Awards: Academy Award, 2 Golden Globes

Edmund Gwenn (born Edmund John Kellaway; 26 September 1877 – 6 September 1959) was an English actor. On film, he is best remembered for his role as Kris Kringle in the Christmas film Miracle on 34th Street (1947), for which he won the Academy Award for Best Supporting Actor, the corresponding Golden Globe Award, and a Photoplay Award. He received a second Golden Globe, Photoplay Award, and another Academy Award nomination for the comedy film Mister 880 (1950). He is also remembered for his appearances in four films directed by Alfred Hitchcock.

As a stage actor in the West End and on Broadway, he was associated with a wide range of works by modern playwrights, including Bernard Shaw, John Galsworthy and J. B. Priestley. After the Second World War, he lived in the United States, where he had a successful career in Hollywood and Broadway.

== Life and career ==
=== Early years ===
Gwenn was born in Wandsworth, London, to John and Catherine (née Oliver) Kellaway. His brother was the actor Arthur Chesney, and his cousin was the actor Cecil Kellaway. Gwenn was educated at St. Olave's School and later at King's College London. He began his acting career in the theatre in 1895, and learned his craft as a member of Willie Edouin's company, playing brash comic roles. In 1901 he married Minnie Terry, niece of Dame Ellen Terry. In the same year, he went to Australia and acted there for three years with the J. C. Williamson company. His wife accompanied him, and when Gwenn was in a production of Ben Hur that was a disastrous failure, she restored the couple's fortunes by accepting an engagement from Williamson. Later, the couple appeared on stage together in London in a farce called What the Butler Saw in 1905 and, in 1911, when Irene Vanbrugh made her debut in variety, she chose Terry and Gwenn to join her in a short play specially written by J. M. Barrie.

When he returned to London, Gwenn appeared not in low comedy but in what The Times called "a notably intellectual and even sophisticated setting" at the Court Theatre under the management of J. E. Vedrenne and Harley Granville-Barker. There, in 1905 to 1907, in the words of The Times, "he was invaluable in smaller parts [giving] every part he played its full worth", including Straker, the proletarian chauffeur to John Tanner in Bernard Shaw's Man and Superman, and Drinkwater, the cockney gangster in Captain Brassbound's Conversion. He also appeared in plays by Granville-Barker and John Galsworthy, in Elizabeth Robins's suffragette drama Votes for Women and in works by other contemporaries. In Barrie's What Every Woman Knows (1908) in the role of the over-enthusiastic James Wylie he impressed the producer Charles Frohman, who engaged him for his repertory company at the Duke of York's Theatre. In 1912, Gwenn went into management in partnership with Hilda Trevelyan. His career was interrupted by his military service during the First World War, serving as an officer in the British Army. During the war, Gwenn's marriage broke up and was dissolved. His ex-wife remarried but remained on affectionate terms with him.

=== Leading roles on stage and screen ===
After peace returned, Gwenn's leading roles in the West End during the 1920s included Old Bill in Bruce Bairnsfather's Old Bill, M.P. (1922); Christian Veit in Lilac Time (1922–23); the title role in A. A. Milne's The Great Broxoff (1923); Leo Swinburne in Good Luck by Seymour Hicks and Ian Hay (1923); and Hippolyte Gallipot in Lehár's Frasquita (1925). Looking back at Gwenn's career, The Times considered, "Out of scores of other parts which he played in England and in America, the best remembered are probably Hornblower in Galsworthy's The Skin Game, the Viennese paterfamilias in Lilac Time and Samuel Pepys in Fagan's And So to Bed in 1926."

Gwenn began his film career in 1916, playing Macbeth in The Real Thing at Last, a satire of the American film industry written by Peter Pan playwright J. M. Barrie. A notable early role was a recreation of his stage character Hornblower in the 1921 Anglo-Dutch silent film of The Skin Game, which he reprised ten years later in Alfred Hitchcock's early sound version of The Skin Game. His debut in a talking picture was in an adaptation of Shaw's How He Lied to Her Husband, made at Elstree in 1931. Of Gwenn's many British film roles, The Times considered his best known to be Jess Oakroyd in The Good Companions with John Gielgud and Jessie Matthews (1933) and Radfern in Carol Reed's Laburnum Grove with Cedric Hardwicke (1936). His final British film role, as a capitalist trying to take over a family brewery in Cheer Boys Cheer (1939) is credited with being the first authentic Ealing comedy.

Gwenn appeared in more than eighty films, including Pride and Prejudice (1940), Cheers for Miss Bishop, Of Human Bondage and The Keys of the Kingdom. George Cukor's Sylvia Scarlett (1935) was his first appearance in a Hollywood film, as Katharine Hepburn's father. He settled in Hollywood in 1940 and became part of its British colony. He had a small role as a Cockney assassin in a Hitchcock film, Foreign Correspondent in 1940. For his Santa Claus role in Miracle on 34th Street he won an Academy Award for Best Supporting Actor. He received a second Oscar nomination for his role in Mister 880 (1950). Near the end of his career, he played one of the main roles in Them! (1954) and in Hitchcock's The Trouble with Harry (1955). His last film role was in the Spanish satire The Rocket from Calabuch (1956), directed by Luis García Berlanga.

On Broadway Gwenn starred in the acclaimed 1942 production of Chekhov's Three Sisters, starring Katharine Cornell (who was also the producer), Judith Anderson, and Ruth Gordon. Time proclaimed it, "a dream production by anybody's reckoning – the most glittering cast the theatre has seen, commercially, in this generation."

=== Later years ===
Gwenn remained a British subject all his life. When he first moved to Hollywood, he lived at the Beverly Wilshire Hotel in Beverly Hills. His home in London had been reduced to rubble during the bombings by the German Luftwaffe in the Second World War. Only the fireplace survived. What Gwenn regretted most was the loss of the memorabilia he had collected of the actor Henry Irving. Eventually, Gwenn bought a house at 617 North Bedford Drive in Beverly Hills, which he later shared with the former Olympic athlete Rodney Soher. At the age of 78 he travelled from his home in California for a reunion with his ex-wife in London. He told a reporter, "I never married again because I was very happy with my wife. I simply stayed faithful to the memory of that happiness."

=== Death ===
Gwenn died from pneumonia after suffering a stroke, in Woodland Hills, California, on 6 September 1959, twenty days before his 82nd birthday. He was cremated, and his ashes were placed in the private vaults at the Chapel of the Pines Crematory in Los Angeles. Gwenn has a star on the Hollywood Walk of Fame at 1751 Vine Street for his contribution to motion pictures.

On March 5, 2023, Gwenn's misplaced urn was located in Vault 5 of Chapel of the Pines Crematory by librarian and researcher Jessica Wahl and Arthur Dark, creator of the Hollywood Graveyard YouTube channel. Dark said "Most of the urns there are simple copper-box urns, stacked nicely like books of life on shelves. Because of the large size and non-standard shape of Edmund’s urn – which wouldn’t nicely fit with the stacked box urns – we suspect his urn was simply placed in another room on another shelf, out of chronological order, wherever it would fit at the time. This is how his urn eventually became lost." After a GoFundMe campaign was organized by Wahl and Dark with the permission of Gwenn's surviving family, Gwenn's urn was relocated to a publicly accessible niche in the Cathedral Mausoleum of Hollywood Forever Cemetery on December 3, 2023.

== Acting credits ==
=== Film ===
- The Real Thing at Last (1916) as Rupert K. Thunder / Macbeth
- Unmarried (1920) as Simm Vandeleur
- The Skin Game (1921) as Hornblower
- How He Lied to Her Husband (1931) as Teddy Bompas
- The Skin Game (1931) as Mr. Hornblower
- Hindle Wakes (1931) as Chris Hawthorne
- Frail Women (1932) as The Bookmaker - Jim Willis
- Money for Nothing (1932) as Sir Henry Blossom
- Condemned to Death (1932) as Banting
- Love on Wheels (1932) as Philpotts
- Tell Me Tonight (1932) as Mayor Pategg
- The Good Companions (1933) as Jess Oakroyd
- Cash (1933) as Edmund Gilbert
- I Was a Spy (1933) as Burgomaster
- Smithy (1933) as John Smith
- Channel Crossing (1933) as Trotter
- Marooned (1933) as Tom Roberts
- Friday the Thirteenth (1933) as Mr. Wakefield
- Early to Bed (1933) as Kruger
- Waltzes from Vienna (1934) as Johann Strauss, the Elder
- Warn London (1934) as Dr. Herman Krauss
- Passing Shadows (1934) as David Lawrence
- Java Head (1934) as Jeremy Ammidon
- The Admiral's Secret (1934) as Admiral Fitzporter
- Father and Son (1934) as John Bolton
- Spring in the Air (1934) as Franz
- The Bishop Misbehaves (1935) as Bishop
- Sylvia Scarlett (1935) as Henry Scarlett
- The Walking Dead (1936) as Dr. Beaumont
- Laburnum Grove (1936) as Mr. Radfern
- Anthony Adverse (1936) as John Bonnyfeather
- All American Chump (1936) as Jeffrey Crane
- Mad Holiday (1936) as Williams
- Parnell (1937) as Campbell
- South Riding (1938) as Alfred Huggins
- A Yank at Oxford (1938) as Dean of Cardinal
- Penny Paradise (1938) as Joe Higgins
- Cheer Boys Cheer (1939) as Edward Ironside
- The Earl of Chicago (1940) as Munsey, the Butler
- An Englishman's Home (1940) as Tom Brown
- The Doctor Takes a Wife (1940) as Dr. Lionel Sterling
- Pride and Prejudice (1940) as Mr. Bennet
- Foreign Correspondent (1940) as Rowley
- Cheers for Miss Bishop (1941) as President Corcoran
- Scotland Yard (1941) as Inspector Cork
- The Devil and Miss Jones (1941) as Hooper
- One Night in Lisbon (1941) as Lord Fitzleigh
- Charley's Aunt (1941) as Stephen Spettigue
- A Yank at Eton (1942) as Headmaster Justin
- Forever and a Day (1943) as Stubbs
- The Meanest Man in the World (1943) as Frederick P. Leggitt
- Lassie Come Home (1943) as Rowlie
- Between Two Worlds (1944) as Scrubby
- The Keys of the Kingdom (1944) as Father Hamish MacNabb
- Dangerous Partners (1945) as Albert Richard Kingby
- Bewitched (1945) as Dr. Bergson
- She Went to the Races (1945) as Dr. Homer Pecke
- Of Human Bondage (1946) as Athelny
- Undercurrent (1946) as Professor 'Dink' Hamilton
- Miracle on 34th Street (1947) as Kris Kringle
- Life with Father (1947) as Reverend Dr. Lloyd
- Thunder in the Valley (1947) as Adam MacAdam
- Green Dolphin Street (1947) as Octavius Patourel
- Apartment for Peggy (1948) as Professor Henry Barnes
- Hills of Home (1948) as Dr. William MacLure
- Challenge to Lassie (1949) as John Traill
- A Woman of Distinction (1950) as Mark 'J.M.' Middlecott
- Louisa (1950) as Henry Hammond
- Pretty Baby (1950) as Cyrus Baxter
- Mister 880 (1950) as William 'Skipper' Miller
- For Heaven's Sake (1950) as Arthur
- Peking Express (1951) as Father Joseph Murray
- Sally and Saint Anne (1952) as Grandpa Pat Ryan
- Les Misérables (1952) as Bishop Courbet
- Bonzo Goes to College (1952) as Ted 'Pop' Drew
- Something for the Birds (1952) as 'Admiral' Johnnie Adams
- Mister Scoutmaster (1953) as Dr. Stone
- The Bigamist (1953) as Mr. Jordan
- The Student Prince (1954) as Professor Juttner
- Them! (1954) as Dr. Harold Medford
- The Trouble with Harry (1955) as Captain Albert Wiles
- It's a Dog's Life (1955) as Jeremiah Edward Emmett Augustus Nolan
- Calabuch (1956, U.S. title The Rocket from Calabuch) as Professor Jorge Serra Hamilton
- Alfred Hitchcock Presents (1957) (Season 2 Episode 36: "Father and Son") as Joe Saunders

=== Radio appearances ===
Year	Program	Episode/source
1940	Forecast*	The Lodger
1943	Suspense	The Fountain Plays
1944	Creeps by Night	The Strange Burial of Alexander Jordan
1949	Suspense	Murder in Black and White
1951	Stars of Hollywood	A Christmas Carol
1953	Stars over Hollywood	A Christmas Carol

- Audition program for the Suspense radio program.

== See also ==
- List of Academy Award winners and nominees from Great Britain
- List of actors with Academy Award nominations
- List of actors with more than one Academy Award nomination in the acting categories
- List of oldest and youngest Academy Award winners and nominees — Oldest winners for Best Supporting Actor
- List of Golden Globe winners
