= R v Larsonneur =

- Court: Court of Criminal Appeal
- Citation: [1933] 24 Cr. App. R. 74

Court membership
- Judges sitting: Viscount Hewart and Avory and Humphreys JJ

Keywords
- Actus reus: status offences

R v Larsonneur (1933) was a case heard in the Court of Criminal Appeals of England and Wales that has been used to illustrate the applicability of actus reus to strict liability offences.

== Facts ==
Larsonneur, a French national, was given permission to enter the United Kingdom with a number of conditions on her stay. After her arrival, these conditions were changed and she was ordered to leave the United Kingdom before 22 March 1933. She complied with the order and went to the Irish Free State. She was subsequently deported from Ireland and was forced to return to Holyhead on the 21 April 1933. On arrival, she was arrested and charged with breaching the Aliens Order 1920, which made it a criminal offence to be found in the United Kingdom.

== Appellate decision ==
The appellant's lawyer, Marston Garsia, argued that "the mere fact of being found in the United Kingdom after the time of her departure therefrom had expired was not in itself an offence, unless it could be proved in addition that she landed in the United Kingdom in contravention of Art. 1. Here the evidence showed that she had not landed at all, but that she had been landed by a superior force over which she had no control".

Lord Hewart CJ dismissed the appeal and sided with the Crown who argued that how Miss Larsonneur got to the United Kingdom "makes no difference at all".

== Criticism ==
The decision to apply strict liability has attracted critique as it gives rise to criminal liability even when one's actions are involuntary. A similar set of facts occurred in the case of Winzar v Chief Constable of Kent (1983).

== See also ==
- Terrorism Act 2000, which introduced a strict liability offence of belonging to a proscribed terrorist organisation
