= Phyllis Konstam =

English actress (1907–1976)

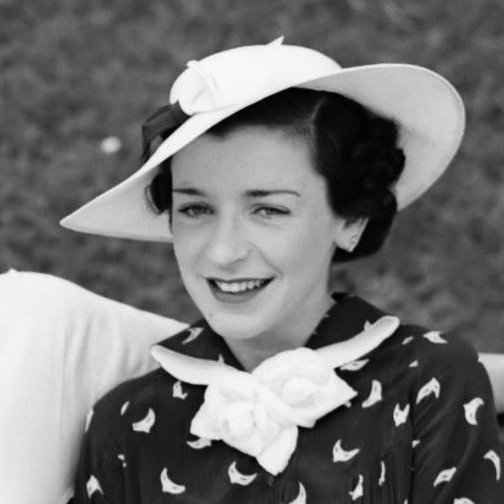
- Konstam in 1936
- Born: 14 April 1907; London, England
- Died: 20 August 1976 (aged 69); Somerset, England
- Occupation: Actress
- Years active: 1928–1964
- Spouse: Bunny Austin
- Relatives: Anna Konstam (sister)

Phyllis Esther Kohnstamm (14 April 1907 – 20 August 1976), known as Phyllis Konstam, was an English film actress born in London. She appeared in 12 films between 1928 and 1964, including four directed by Alfred Hitchcock.

== Life ==
Phyllis Esther Kohnstamm was born in London in 1907, the daughter of Jewish parents Alfred and Esther Kohnstamm, of Middleheath, Hampstead. Her father, with his brother, cultivated a successful leather business. She had her drama training in Paris before her first appearance which was at the Theatre Royal Haymarket in The Jew of Malta in 1925. The following year she was "a wife" in Escape by John Galsworthy in London's West End. In 1930 she appeared in the first film version directed with the same name by Basil Dean.

She married the tennis star Bunny Austin in 1931, whom she met on a cruise liner while travelling to the US to appear in a stage production of Frank Vosper's Murder on the Second Floor, opposite her close friend Laurence Olivier. Together, Austin and Konstam were one of the celebrity couples of the age. Austin played tennis with Charlie Chaplin, was a friend of Daphne du Maurier and met both Queen Mary and President Franklin D. Roosevelt. They had two children.

In her later years, she joined her husband with involvement in the Oxford Group, performing in several films and theatrical productions around the world to benefit the cause. Together, they wrote an autobiography titled "A Mixed Double". She died in Somerset from a heart attack on 20 August 1976, aged 69.

== Filmography ==
- Champagne (1928)
- Blackmail (1929)
- Murder! (1930)
- Escape (1930)
- Compromising Daphne (1930)
- The Skin Game (1931)
- Tilly of Bloomsbury (1931)
- A Gentleman of Paris (1931)
- Jotham Valley (1952)
- The Forgotten Factor (1952)
- The Kindled Flame (short) (1939)
- The Crowning Experience (1960)
- Voice of the Hurricane (1964)
