= Tilly of Bloomsbury (1921 film) =

1921 film

- Directed by: Rex Wilson
- Written by: Ian Hay
- Starring: Edna Best; Tom Reynolds; Campbell Gullan
- Production company: G.B. Samuelson Productions
- Release date: September 1921
- Running time: 50 minutes
- Country: United Kingdom
- Language: English

Tilly of Bloomsbury is a 1921 British silent comedy film directed by Rex Wilson and starring Edna Best, Tom Reynolds, Henry Kendall and Isabel Jeans. It is based on the play Tilly of Bloomsbury by Ian Hay, and was the first of three film adaptations.

== Cast ==
- Edna Best as Tilly Welwyn
- Tom Reynolds as Samuel Stillbottle
- Campbell Gullan as Percy Welwyn
- Henry Kendall as Dick Mainwaring
- Helen Haye as Lady Adela Mainwaring
- Frederick Lewis as Abel Mainwaring
- Georgette de Nove as Martha Welwyn
- Leonard Pagden as Lucius Welwyn
- Isabel Jeans as Sylvia Mainwaring
- Vera Lennox as Amelia Mainwaring
- Lottie Blackford as Mrs. Banks
