= Totality principle =

The totality principle is a common law principle which applies when a court imposes multiple sentences of imprisonment. The principle was first formulated by David Thomas in his 1970 study of the sentencing decisions of the Court of Appeal of England and Wales:

The effect of the totality principle is to require a sentencer who has passed a series of sentences, each properly calculated in relation to the offence for which it is imposed and each properly made consecutive in accordance with the principles governing consecutive sentences, to review the aggregate sentence and consider whether the aggregate is 'just and appropriate'. The principle has been stated many times in various forms: 'when a number of offences are being dealt with and specific punishments in respect of them are being totted up to make a total, it is always necessary for the court to take a last look at the total just to see whether it looks wrong'; 'when ... cases of multiplicity of offences come before the court, the court must not content itself by doing the arithmetic and passing the sentence which the arithmetic produces. It must look at the totality of the criminal behaviour and ask itself what is the appropriate sentence for all the offences.'

== Application ==
=== United Kingdom ===
Within the context of English and Welsh law, the totality principle is defined within the Criminal Justice Act 1991, that states that nothing in the Act "shall prevent the court ... in the case of an offender who is convicted of one or more other offences, from mitigating his sentence by applying any rule of law as to the totality of sentences". The principle was recognised in the Criminal Justice Act 2003 Section 166 (3)(b), and currently in section 77 of the Sentencing Act 2020.

Following the passage of the Coroners and Justice Act 2009, when passing sentence, judges and magistrates must do so in accordance with the sentencing guidelines published by the Sentencing Council along with the Offences Taken into Consideration (TICs).

The sentencing guidelines recommend that concurrent sentences ought to be given when offences arise out of the same incident, or are of the same or similar kind. Consecutive sentences are more appropriate when "offences arise out of unrelated facts or incidents", offences are "committed in the same incident are distinct, involving an aggravating element that requires separate recognition", "offences are of the same or similar kind but the overall criminality will not sufficiently be reflected by concurrent sentences" or "one or more offence(s) qualifies for a statutory minimum sentence and concurrent sentences would improperly undermine that minimum".

The principle of totality comprises two elements:

When sentencing for more than one offence, the overriding principle of totality is that the overall sentence should:

- reflect all of the offending behaviour with reference to overall harm and culpability, together with the aggravating and mitigating factors relating to the offences and those personal to the offender; and
- be just and proportionate.

In 2020, the Court of Appeal rejected submissions that sentencing judges had to use specific wording to give effect to the totality guidelines, noting: "What matters is whether the final sentence is just and proportionate, taking into account all the relevant facts and matters."

=== Australia ===
The totality principle is "well established" in the common law of Australia. The High Court quoted Thomas's formulation of the principle in Mill v R (1988). It is also reflected in the Crimes Act 1914 (Cth) s 16B.

As well as to prevent an excessive sentence, the principle is a product of two further principles "namely proportionality and mercy." Further, the principle must be applied "without a suggestion that a discount is given for multiple offences."

=== Canada ===
Section 718.2 applies the totality principle by stating that: c) where consecutive sentences are imposed, the combined sentence should not be unduly long or harsh; This is so as to "avoid sentences that cumulatively are out of proportion to the gravity of the offences." In application it requires Canadian courts to craft a global sentence of all offences that is not excessive. If the total sentence is excessive the court must adjust the sentence so that the "total sentence is proper". A sentence may violate the totality principle where:

1. The global sentence considerably exceeds the "normal" level of the most serious of the individual offences.
2. The global sentence "exceeds what is appropriate given the offender's overall culpability.

=== Hong Kong ===
Hong Kong Basic Law is based on the principles of English common law, and hence include the totality principle, which are applied by the Department of Justice.

=== New Zealand ===
The totality principle applies within New Zealand law. Aware of public concerns re perceived sentence discounting by the judiciary for multiple offences, the courts state that this assumes that offenders are "rational and well-informed calculators of the cost/benefit of committing offences", and hence see the correct application of the totality principle as "recognising a need to balance totality with deterrence and adequate denunciation of the conduct involved."
