= Helen Haye =

British actress (1874–1957)

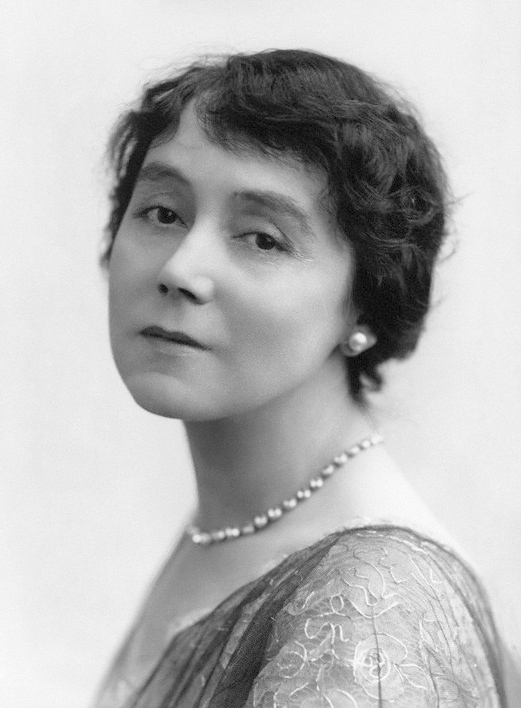
- Helen Haye in 1914
- Born: Helen Hay; 28 August 1874; Assam, British India
- Died: 1 September 1957 (aged 83); London, England
- Occupation: Actress
- Years active: 1898–1957
- Spouse: Ernest Attenborough

Helen Haye (born Helen Mary Hay, 28 August 1874 – 1 September 1957) was a British stage and film actress.

== Stage ==
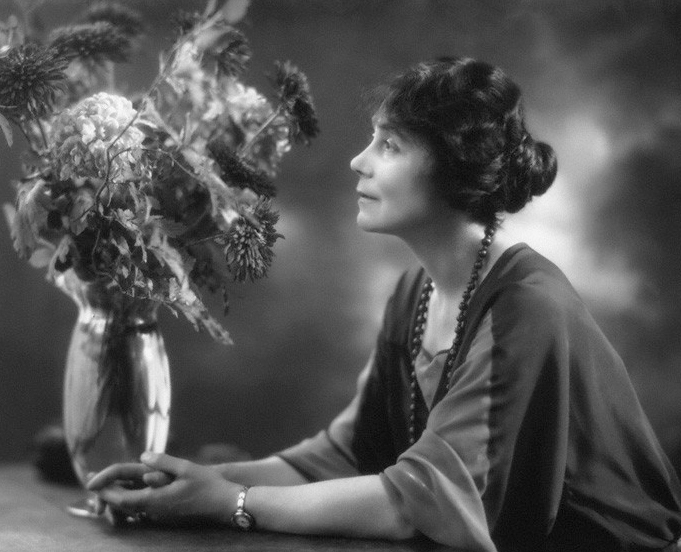
Helen Haye in 1922

Hay (who later adopted the surname Haye) began acting on the stage in 1898 and debuted in London in 1911 as Gertrude in Hamlet. In 1927, she starred in John Van Druten's Chance Acquaintance at the Criterion Theatre. In 1950, she was in Benn Levy's Return to Tyassi at the Duke of York's Theatre.

== Films ==
Her film career began in 1916 with Honour in Pawn. She often worked with director Alexander Korda. One of her later film appearances was in Laurence Olivier's Richard III (1955), as the Duchess of York.

Haye died four days after her 83rd birthday in London.

== Selected filmography ==
- Honour in Pawn (1916) - Mrs. Fortescue
- Masks and Faces (1917) - Dame Best
- Not Negotiable (1918)
- His Last Defence (1919) - Hesper Oddington
- Bleak House (1920) - Miss Barbay
- The Skin Game (1921) - Mrs. Hillcrist
- Tilly of Bloomsbury (1921) - Lady Adela Mainwaring
- Atlantic (1929) - Clara Tate-Hughes
- Knowing Men (1930) - Marquise de Jarmais
- The Nipper (1930) - Lady Sevenoaks
- Beyond the Cities (1930) - Amy Hayes
- The Skin Game (1931) - Mrs. Hillcrist
- Brown Sugar (1931) - Lady Knightsbridge
- The Officers' Mess (1931) - Mrs. Harbottle
- Monte Carlo Madness (1932) - Isabel
- Congress Dances (1932) - Princess
- Her First Affaire (1932) - Lady Bragden
- It's a Boy (1933) - Mrs. Bogle
- This Week of Grace (1933) - Lady Warmington
- Money Mad (1934) - Lady Leyland
- Crazy People (1934) - Aunt Caroline
- The Dictator (1935) - Queen Mother Juliana
- Drake of England (1935) - Lady Lennox
- The 39 Steps (1935) - Mrs. Jordan
- The Tunnel (1935) - Oil Magnate (uncredited)
- Wolf's Clothing (1936) - Mildred Girling
- The Interrupted Honeymoon (1936) - Aunt Harriet
- Everybody Dance (1936) - Lady Morton
- Wings of the Morning (1937) - Aunt Jenepher
- Cotton Queen (1937) - Margaret Owen
- The Girl in the Taxi (1937) - Delphine des Aubrais
- Sidewalks of London (1938) - Selina
- A Girl Must Live (1939) - Aunt Primrose
- Riding High (1939) - Miss Ada Broadbent
- The Spy in Black (1939) - Mrs. Sedley
- The Case of the Frightened Lady (1940) - Lady Lebanon
- Kipps (1941) - Mrs. Walshingham
- The Man in Grey (1943) - Lady Rohan
- Dear Octopus (1943) - Dora Randolph
- Fanny by Gaslight (1944) - Mrs. Somerford
- Madonna of the Seven Moons (1945) - Mother Superior
- A Place of One's Own (1945) - Mrs. Manning Tutthorn
- Mine Own Executioner (1947) - Lady Maresfield
- Mrs. Fitzherbert (1947) - Lady Sefton
- Anna Karenina (1948) - Countess Vronsky
- Third Time Lucky (1949) - Old Lady
- Conspirator (1949) - Lady Witheringham
- Front Page Story (1954) - Susan's Mother
- Hobson's Choice (1954) - Mrs. Hepworth
- Lilacs in the Spring (1954) - Lady Drayton
- Richard III (1955) - Duchess of York
- My Teenage Daughter (1956) - Aunt Louisa
- Action of the Tiger (1957) - Countess Valona
- The Gypsy and the Gentleman (1958) - Lady Caroline Ayrton (final film role)
