= T. R. F. Butler =

English barrister and judge (1894-1976)

- Born: 24 May 1894
- Died: 9 March 1976 (aged 81)
- Education: University College, Oxford
- Occupations: Barrister, Judge, legal writer
- Notable work: Archbold Criminal Pleading, Evidence and Practice

Theobald Richard Fitzwalter Butler (24 May 1894 – 9 March 1976) was an English barrister, judge, and legal writer. He is known for his long tenure as editor and later editor-in-chief of Archbold Criminal Pleading, Evidence and Practice, a leading English criminal law text.

== Early life and education ==
Butler was born in Tunbridge Wells, Kent, on 24 May 1894 into an aristocratic Irish family and was a kinsman of the Butler Barons Dunboyne. He was the only son of Theobald Butler, of the Indian Woods and Forests Service, and his wife Charlotte Elizabeth (née Bailey), of Green Park, County Limerick.

He was educated at Charterhouse School in Godalming, Surrey, where he distinguished himself academically, winning a Senior Foundation Scholarship in 1908 and numerous prizes in Classics and Divinity. In 1913, he won an Exhibition in Classics to University College, Oxford, which he entered that autumn.

The outbreak of the First World War occurred while Butler was at Oxford. Although a Protestant, he declined military service, believing that he might be required to fight Irishmen. C. S. Lewis, a contemporary at Oxford, described Butler as a “Home Ruler”, remarking, “I like Butler exceedingly”. Instead, Butler and another contemporary, Eric Dodds, served as non-combatant humanitarians with the British Eastern Auxiliary Hospital in Belgrade during the severe typhus epidemic in Serbia in 1915.

He was among the small number of students to graduate during the war years, achieving First-class honours in Classical Moderations (1915) and Jurisprudence (1917).

After Oxford, Butler passed his Bar finals in Hilary Term 1920, placing first in his class and receiving a Certificate of Honour. He was called to the Bar by the Inner Temple later that year.

== Legal career ==
Butler joined the Midland Circuit and supplemented his initially modest income by reporting criminal cases for legal publications, an activity he continued throughout his career. He developed a substantial circuit practice and was regarded as “a scrupulously fair but formidable opponent”.

Between 1945 and 1967, Butler held a series of judicial appointments, serving as:

- Recorder of Newark (1945–62)
- Recorder of Derby (1962–63)
- Deputy Chairman and then Chairman of the Nottinghamshire Quarter Sessions (1951–54; 1954–63)
- Deputy Chairman of the Middlesex Quarter Sessions (1960–65)
- Deputy Chairman of the Kent Quarter Sessions (1963)
- Chairman of the South East Area, Greater London Quarter Sessions (1965–67)
- Diocesan Chancellor of Peterborough (a judge of the consistory court) (from 1962).

As a judge, he was described as being “in his element, always firmly in control and impartial, without ever abusing his position”.

From 1931 to 1973 (apart from a brief interlude for the 30th edition in 1938) Butler served as editor (28th–29th editions) and later editor-in-chief (31st–38th editions) of Archbold Criminal Pleading, Evidence and Practice.

He was elected a bencher of the Inner Temple in 1960.

== Personal life ==
Butler maintained a private personal life and remained unmarried until middle age. In July 1948, he married Laura Rachel Mary Nash, daughter of Sir Vincent Nash, a Deputy Lieutenant of County Limerick. The marriage produced no children.

He retained a strong interest in his Irish aristocratic heritage and was an active member of the Butler Society, an organisation devoted to the history and genealogy of the Butler family. His recreational interests included bridge and archaeology, and he was a member of the Reform Club.

== Death ==
Butler died on 9 March 1976, aged 81.

His funeral was held at Peterborough Cathedral on 12 March 1976, reflecting his office as Chancellor of that diocese. A memorial service was held at the Temple Church in London on 4 May 1976 and was attended by members of the Bar and judiciary who had known him.
