= Central Criminal Court =

A Central Criminal Court refers to major legal court responsible for trying crimes within a given jurisdiction. Such courts include:

- Central Criminal Court of England and Wales, commonly known as the Old Bailey, the name which the Crown Court uses when sitting in the City of London
- Central Criminal Court, the name for the High Court of Ireland when it is hearing a criminal case
- Central Criminal Court of Iraq
