= List of plays adapted into feature films: R to Z =

This is a list of plays that have been adapted into feature films, whose titles fall into the R to Z alphabetic range. Entries are sorted alphabetically by the title of the play. The title of the play is followed by its first public performance, its playwright, the title of the film adapted from the play, the year of the film and the film's director. If a film has an alternate title based on geographical distribution, the title listed will be that of the widest distribution area. This is a dynamic list and may never be complete. It is limited to entries in which either the play or its film adaptation have an existing article on the English-language Wikipedia. It does not include films based on plays with an unknown title. See also List of plays adapted into feature films: A to I and List of plays adapted into feature films: J to Q.

== List of plays adapted into feature films ==
=== R ===
Play	Playwright	Film	Film director
Rabbit Hole (2006)	David Lindsay-Abaire	Rabbit Hole (2010)	John Cameron Mitchell
The Racket	Bartlett Cormack	The Racket (1928)	Lewis Milestone
The Racket	Bartlett Cormack	The Racket (1951)	John Cromwell
Radiance (1993)	Louis Nowra	Radiance (1988)	Rachel Perkins
Raffles, the Amateur Cracksman (1903)	Eugene W. Presbrey	Raffles, the Amateur Cracksman (1925)	King Baggot
Rafta, Rafta (2007)	Ayub Khan Din	All in Good Time (2012)	Nigel Cole
Rain	John Colton; Clemence Randolph	Sadie Thompson (1928)	Raoul Walsh
Rain	John Colton; Clemence Randolph	Rain (1932)	Lewis Milestone
Rain	John Colton; Clemence Randolph	Miss Sadie Thompson (1953)	Curtis Bernhardt
The Rainmaker (1954)	N. Richard Nash	The Rainmaker (1956)	Joseph Anthony
A Raisin in the Sun (1959)	Lorraine Hansberry	A Raisin in the Sun (1961)	Daniel Petrie
A Raisin in the Sun (1959)	Lorraine Hansberry	A Raisin in the Sun (2008)	Kenny Leon
The Ramblers (1926)	Guy Bolton; Bert Kalmar; Harry Ruby	The Cuckoos (1930)	Paul Sloane
Rashomon	Fay Kanin; Michael Kanin	The Outrage (1964)	Martin Ritt
The Rat (1924)	Ivor Novello; Constance Collier	The Rat (1925)	Graham Cutts
Ratha Kanneer	Tiruvarur K. Thangaraj	Ratha Kanneer (1954)	Krishnan–Panju
Ratha Kanneer	Tiruvarur K. Thangaraj	Raktha Kanneeru (2003)	Sadhu Kokila
Ratón en Ferretería (1972)	Román Chalbaud	Ratón de ferretería (1985)	Román Chalbaud
The Rat Race (1950)	Garson Kanin	The Rat Race (1960)	Robert Mulligan
The Rats (1911)	Gerhart Hauptmann	The Rats (1921)	Hanns Kobe
The Rats (1911)	Gerhart Hauptmann	Die Ratten (1955)	Robert Siodmak
Rattlesnakes	Graham Farrow	Rattlesnakes (2019)	Julius Amedume
Ready Money (1912)	James Montgomery	Ready Money (1914)	Oscar Apfel
Real Women Have Curves (1990)	Josefina López	Real Women Have Curves (2002)	Patricia Cardoso
The Rear Car (1922)	Edward Everett Rose	Murder in the Private Car (1934)	Harry Beaumont
Rebound	Donald Ogden Stewart	Rebound (1931)	Edward H. Griffith
Recipe for Murder (1932)	Arnold Ridley	Blind Justice (1934)	Bernard Vorhaus
Reckless (1983)	Craig Lucas	Reckless (1995)	Norman René
Recklessness (1913)	Eugene O'Neill	The Constant Woman (1933)	Victor Schertzinger
The Red Cat	Rudolf Lothar	That Night in Rio (1941)	Irving Cummings
The Red Cat	Rudolf Lothar	On the Riviera (1951)	Walter Lang
Red Dust (1928)	Wilson Collison	Red Dust (1932)	Victor Fleming
Red Dust (1928)	Wilson Collison	Mogambo (1953)	John Ford
Redemption (1918)	Arthur Hopkins	Redemption (1930)	Fred Niblo
Red Planet	John L. Balderston; John Hoare	Red Planet Mars (1952)	Harry Horner
Red Roses and Petrol	Joseph O'Connor	Red Roses and Petrol (2008)	Tamar Simon Hoffs
Red Sky at Morning (1935)	Dymphna Cusack	Red Sky at Morning (1944)	Hartney Arthur
The Red Widow (1911)	Channing Pollock; Rennold Wolf	The Red Widow (1916)	James Durkin
Redwood Curtain (1992)	Lanford Wilson	Redwood Curtain (1995)	John Korty
Refuge (1999)	Jessica Goldberg	Refuge (2012)	Jessica Goldberg
The Regeneration	Walter Hackett; Owen Frawley Kildare	Regeneration (1915)	Raoul Walsh
The Registered Woman	John Farrow	A Woman of Experience (1931)	Harry Joe Brown
Relative Values (1951)	Noël Coward	Relative Values (2000)	Eric Styles
The Reluctant Debutante (1955)	William Douglas Home	The Reluctant Debutante (1958)	Vincente Minnelli
The Reluctant Debutante (1955)	William Douglas Home	What a Girl Wants (2003)	Dennie Gordon
Reluctant Heroes (1950)	Colin Morris	Reluctant Heroes (1951)	Jack Raymond
Remains to Be Seen (1951) by	Russel Crouse; Howard Lindsay	Remains to Be Seen (1953)	Don Weis
The Remarkable Mr. Pennypacker (1953)	Liam O'Brien	The Remarkable Mr. Pennypacker (1959)	Henry Levin
The Removalists (1971)	David Williamson	The Removalists (1975)	Tom Jeffrey
Repo! The Genetic Opera (2002)	Terrance Zdunich; Darren Smith	Repo! The Genetic Opera (2008)	Darren Lynn Bousman
Requiem for a Heavyweight (1956)	Rod Serling	Requiem for a Heavyweight (1962)	Ralph Nelson
RER (2006)	Jean-Marie Besset	The Girl on the Train (2009)	André Téchiné
The Respectful Prostitute (1946)	Jean-Paul Sartre	The Respectful Prostitute (1952)	Marcello Pagliero
The Return of Peter Grimm (1911)	David Belasco	The Return of Peter Grimm (1926)	Victor Schertzinger
The Return of Peter Grimm (1911)	David Belasco	The Return of Peter Grimm (1935)	George Nicholls Jr.
Reunion in Vienna (1931)	Robert Emmet Sherwood	Reunion in Vienna (1933)	Sidney Franklin
The Revenge (1834)	Aleksander Fredro	The Revenge (2002)	Andrzej Wajda
The Revengers' Comedies (1989)	Alan Ayckbourn	Sweet Revenge (1998)	Malcolm Mowbray
The Revenger's Tragedy (1606)	Thomas Middleton	Revengers Tragedy (2002)	Alex Cox
Rhinoceros (1959)	Eugène Ionesco	Rhinoceros (1974)	Tom O'Horgan
Riada	Bryant Adair	It's Always the Woman (1916)	Wilfred Noy
Richard III (c. 1592–1594)	William Shakespeare	Richard III (1912)	André Calmettes
Richard III (c. 1592–1594)	William Shakespeare	Richard III (1955)	Laurence Olivier
Richard III (c. 1592–1594)	William Shakespeare	An Age of Kings (1960)	Michael Hayes
Richard III (c. 1592–1594)	William Shakespeare	Tower of London (1962)	Roger Corman
Richard III (c. 1592–1594)	William Shakespeare	Richard III (1995)	Richard Loncraine
Richard III (c. 1592–1594)	William Shakespeare	Looking for Richard (1996)	Al Pacino
Richard III (c. 1592–1594)	William Shakespeare	King Rikki (2002)	James Gavin Bedford
Richard III (c. 1592–1594)	William Shakespeare	Richard III (2007)	Scott M. Anderson
Richard III (c. 1592–1594)	William Shakespeare	No Beast. So Fierce. (2025)	Burhan Qurbani
Richelieu (1839)	Edward Bulwer-Lytton	Richelieu (1914)	Allan Dwan
Richelieu (1839)	Edward Bulwer-Lytton	Cardinal Richelieu (1935)	Rowland V. Lee
The Rich, Full Life (1945)	Viña Delmar	Cynthia (1947)	Robert Z. Leonard
Rich Man, Poor Man (1916)	George Broadhurst	Rich Man, Poor Man (1918)	J. Searle Dawley
Riders to the Sea (1904)	John Millington Synge	Riders to the Sea (1936)	Brian Desmond Hurst
Riff-Raff (1995)	Laurence Fishburne	Once in the Life (2000)	Laurence Fishburne
The Ringer (1929)	Edgar Wallace	The Ringer (1952)	Guy Hamilton
Ringside	Edward E. Paramore Jr. Hyatt Daab; George Abbott	Night Parade (1929)	Malcolm St. Clair
Rip Van Winkle (1865)	Dion Boucicault; Joseph Jefferson	Rip Van Winkle (1921)	Edward Ludwig
The Rise and Fall of Little Voice (1992)		Little Voice (1998)	Mark Herman
Rita Coventry (1923)	Hubert Osborne	Don't Call It Love (1923)	William C. deMille
Rita, Sue and Bob Too (1982)	Andrea Dunbar	Rita, Sue and Bob Too (1987)	Alan Clarke
The Ritz (1975)	Terrence McNally	The Ritz (1976)	Richard Lester
The River (1925)	Patrick Hastings	The Notorious Lady (1927)	King Baggot
The River Niger (1973)	Joseph A. Walker	The River Niger (1976)	Krishna Shah
Road House	Walter Hackett	Road House (1934)	Maurice Elvey
Roads of Destiny (1918)	Channing Pollock	Roads of Destiny (1921)	Frank Lloyd
The Road to Mecca	Athol Fugard	The Road to Mecca (1991)	Athol Fugard; Peter Goldsmid
The Road to Rome (1926)	Robert E. Sherwood	Jupiter's Darling (1955)	George Sidney
Robert and Bertram (1856)	Gustav Räder	Robert and Bertram (1938)	Mieczysław Krawicz
Rockabye (1924)	Lucia Bronder	Rockabye (1932)	George Cukor
Romance (1913)	Edward Sheldon	Romance (1920)	Chester Withey
Romance (1913)	Edward Sheldon	Romance (1930)	Clarence Brown
Romancero	Jacques Deval	L'altra metà del cielo (1977)	Franco Rossi
Romance of the Underworld (1911)	Paul Armstrong	Romance of the Underworld (1928)	Irving Cummings
Romance of the Western Chamber (14th century)	Wang Shifu	Romance of the Western Chamber (1927)	Hou Yao
Romantic Comedy	Bernard Slade	Romantic Comedy (1983)	Arthur Hiller
The Romany Rye (1882)	George Robert Sims	The Life Line (1919)	Maurice Tourneur
Romeo et Jeanette (1946)	Jean Anouilh	Monsoon (1952)	Rod Amateau
Romeo and Juliet	William Shakespeare	Romeo and Juliet (1900)	Clément Maurice
Romeo and Juliet	William Shakespeare	Romeo and Juliet (1908)	J. Stuart Blackton
Romeo and Juliet	William Shakespeare	Romeo and Juliet (1916, Metro Pictures)	John W. Noble
Romeo and Juliet	William Shakespeare	Romeo and Juliet (1916, Fox)	J. Gordon Edwards
Romeo and Juliet	William Shakespeare	Romeo and Juliet (1936)	George Cukor
Romeo and Juliet	William Shakespeare	Romeo and Juliet (1940)	José María Castellví
Romeo and Juliet	William Shakespeare	Romeo and Juliet (1943)	Miguel M. Delgado
Romeo and Juliet	William Shakespeare	Romeo and Juliet (1954)	Renato Castellani
Romeo and Juliet	William Shakespeare	Romeo and Juliet (1954)	Enrique Carreras
Romeo and Juliet	William Shakespeare	Romanoff and Juliet (1961)	Peter Ustinov
Romeo and Juliet	William Shakespeare	Romeo and Juliet (1964)	Riccardo Freda
Romeo and Juliet	William Shakespeare	Romeo and Juliet (1968)	Franco Zeffirelli
Romeo and Juliet	William Shakespeare	Aaron Loves Angela (1975)	Gordon Parks Jr.
Romeo and Juliet	William Shakespeare	Romeo + Juliet (1996)	Baz Luhrmann
Romeo and Juliet	William Shakespeare	Love Is All There Is (1996)	Joseph Bologna; Renée Taylor
Romeo and Juliet	William Shakespeare	Romeo and Juliet (2006)	Yves Desgagnés
Romeo and Juliet	William Shakespeare	Romeo and Juliet (2013)	Carlo Carlei
Rookery Nook (1926)	Ben Travers	Rookery Nook (1930)	Tom Walls
Room Service (1937)	Allen Boretz; John Murray	Room Service (1938)	William A. Seiter
Rooted (1969)	Alex Buzo	Rooted (1985)	Ron Way
Rose Bernd (1903)	Gerhart Hauptmann	Rose Bernd (1919)	Alfred Halm
Rose Bernd (1903)	Gerhart Hauptmann	Rose Bernd (1957)	Wolfgang Staudte
A Roomful of Roses (1955)	Edith Sommer	Teenage Rebel (1956)	Edmund Goulding
Room Service (1937)	Allen Boretz; John Murray	Step Lively (1944)	Tim Whelan
Rope (1929)	Patrick Hamilton	Rope (1948)	Alfred Hitchcock
Rosalind (1914)	J. M. Barrie	Forever Female (1953)	Irving Rapper
The Rose of the Rancho	David Belasco	Rose of the Rancho (1914)	Cecil B. DeMille
The Rose of the Rancho	David Belasco	Rose of the Rancho (1936)	Marion Gering
The Rose Tattoo (1951)	Tennessee Williams	The Rose Tattoo (1955)	Daniel Mann
Rosencrantz and Guildenstern Are Dead (1966)	Tom Stoppard	Rosencrantz and Guildenstern Are Dead (1990)	Tom Stoppard
Rosenmontag (1900)	Otto Erich Hartleben	Rosenmontag (1924)	Rudolf Meinert
Rosenmontag (1900)	Otto Erich Hartleben	Love's Carnival (1930)	Hans Steinhoff
The Rossiters	Kenneth Hyde	The Rossiter Case (1951)	Francis Searle
The Rotters (1916)	H. F. Maltby	The Rotters (1921)	A. V. Bramble
The Royal Family (1927)	George S. Kaufman; Edna Ferber	The Royal Family of Broadway (1930)	George Cukor; Cyril Gardner
The Royal Hunt of the Sun (1964)	Peter Shaffer	The Royal Hunt of the Sun (1969)	Irving Lerner
Róża (1909)	Stefan Żeromski	Róża (1936)	Józef Lejtes
The Ruling Class (1968)	Peter Barnes	The Ruling Class (1972)	Peter Medak
Run for Your Wife (1983)	Ray Cooney	Run for Your Wife (2012)	Ray Cooney; John Luton
The Runner Stumbles (1976)	Milan Stitt	The Runner Stumbles (1979)	Stanley Kramer
Rusty Bugles (1948)	Sumner Locke Elliott	Rusty Bugles (1965)	Alan Burke
Rusty Bugles (1948)	Sumner Locke Elliott	Rusty Bugles (1981)	John Matthews
Ruy Blas (1838)	Victor Hugo	Ruy Blas (1948)	Pierre Billon
Ruy Blas (1838)	Victor Hugo	Delusions of Grandeur (1971)	Gérard Oury

=== S ===
Play	Playwright	Film	Film director
Sabirni centar (1982)	Dušan Kovačević	The Meeting Point (1989)	Goran Marković
Sabrina Fair (1953)	Samuel A. Taylor	Sabrina (1954)	Billy Wilder
Sabrina Fair (1953)	Samuel A. Taylor	Sabrina (1995)	Sydney Pollack
Sacred and Profane Love (1920)	Arnold Bennett	Sacred and Profane Love (1921)	William Desmond Taylor
The Sacred Flame (1928)	W. Somerset Maugham	The Sacred Flame (1929)	Archie Mayo
The Sacred Flame (1928)	W. Somerset Maugham	The Sacred Flame (1931)	William Dieterle; Berthold Viertel
Sadie Love (1915)	Avery Hopwood	Sadie Love (1919)	John S. Robertson
Sailor, Beware!	Kenyon Nicholson; Charles Robinson	The Fleet's In (1942)	Victor Schertzinger
Sailor Beware! (1954)	Falkland Cary; Philip King	Sailor Beware! (1956)	Gordon Parry
Saint Joan (1923)	George Bernard Shaw	Saint Joan (1957)	Otto Preminger
Saint Joan (1923)	George Bernard Shaw	Saint Joan (1967)	George Schaefer
Saints and Sinners (1884)	Henry Arthur Jones	Saints and Sinners (1916)	James Kirkwood Sr.
Sally, Irene and Mary (1922)	Eddie Dowling; Cyrus Wood	Sally, Irene and Mary (1925)	Edmund Goulding
Sally, Irene and Mary (1922)	Eddie Dowling; Cyrus Wood	Sally, Irene and Mary (1938)	William A. Seiter
Salome (1891)	Oscar Wilde	Salomé (1923)	Charles Bryant; Alla Nazimova
Salome (1891)	Oscar Wilde	Salome's Last Dance (1988)	Ken Russell
Salome (1891)	Oscar Wilde	Salomé (2013)	Al Pacino
Salomy Jane (1907)	Paul Armstrong	Salomy Jane (1914)	William Nigh; Lucius J. Henderson
Salomy Jane (1907)	Paul Armstrong	Salomy Jane (1923)	George Melford
Salomy Jane (1907)	Paul Armstrong	Wild Girl (1932)	Raoul Walsh
Saloon Bar (1939)	Frank Harvey	Saloon Bar (1940)	Walter Forde
Salvation Nell (1908)	'Edward Sheldon	Salvation Nell (1915)	George E. Middleton
Salvation Nell (1908)	'Edward Sheldon	Salvation Nell (1921)	Kenneth Webb
Salvation Nell (1908)	'Edward Sheldon	Salvation Nell (1931)	James Cruze
Same Time, Next Year (1975)	Bernard Slade	Same Time, Next Year (1978)	Robert Mulligan
Samson (1908)	Henri Bernstein	Samson (1915)	Edgar Lewis
Samson (1908)	Henri Bernstein	Shackles of Gold (1922)	Herbert Brenon
Samson (1908)	Henri Bernstein	Samson (1923)	Torello Rolli
Samson (1908)	Henri Bernstein	Samson (1936)	Maurice Tourneur
San Giuvanni Decollato (1908)	Nino Martoglio	Saint John, the Beheaded (1940)	Giorgio Bianchi; Amleto Palermi
The Sapphires (2005)	Tony Briggs	The Sapphires (2012)	Wayne Blair
Sarafina! (1987)	Mbongeni Ngema; Hugh Masekela	Sarafina! (1992)	Darrell Roodt
Saturday's Children (1927)	Maxwell Anderson	Saturday's Children (1929)	Gregory La Cava
Saturday's Children (1927)	Maxwell Anderson	Saturday's Children (1940)	Vincent Sherman
The Scarecrow (1908)	Percy MacKaye	Puritan Passions (1923)	Frank Tuttle
Scarlet Pages	Samuel Shipman; John B. Hymer	Scarlet Pages (1930)	Ray Enright
Schinderhannes (1927)	Carl Zuckmayer	The Prince of Rogues (1928)	Curtis Bernhardt
Schinderhannes (1927)	Carl Zuckmayer	Der Schinderhannes (1958)	Helmut Käutner
School for Coquettes (1918)	Paul Armont; Marcel Gerbidon	School for Coquettes (1935)	Pierre Colombier
School for Coquettes (1918)	Paul Armont; Marcel Gerbidon	School for Coquettes (1958)	Jacqueline Audry
School for Husbands (1932)	Frederick J. Jackson	School for Husbands (1937)	Andrew Marton
The School for Scandal (1777)	Richard Brinsley Sheridan	The School for Scandal (1923)	Bertram Phillips
The School for Scandal (1777)	Richard Brinsley Sheridan	The School for Scandal (1930)	Maurice Elvey
School of Drama	Hans Székely; Zoltan Egyed	Dramatic School (1938)	Robert B. Sinclair
Scorchers (1985)	David Beaird	Scorchers (1991)	
Score (1970)	Jerry Douglas	Score (1974)	Radley Metzger
The Seagull (1896)	Anton Chekhov	The Sea Gull (1968)	Sidney Lumet
The Seagull (1896)	Anton Chekhov	The Seagull (1972)	Yuli Karasik
The Seagull (1896)	Anton Chekhov	Il gabbiano (1977)	Marco Bellocchio
The Seagull (1896)	Anton Chekhov	Little Lili (2003)	Claude Miller
The Seagull (1896)	Anton Chekhov	Days and Nights (2013)	Christian Camargo
The Seagull (1896)	Anton Chekhov	The Seagull (2018)	Michael Mayer
Seagulls Over Sorrento (1949)	Hugh Hastings	Seagulls Over Sorrento (1954)	John Boulting; Roy Boulting
Search and Destroy	Howard Korder	Search and Destroy (1995)	David Salle
The Search for Signs of Intelligent Life in the Universe (1985)	Jane Wagner	The Search for Signs of Intelligent Life in the Universe (1991)	John Bailey
The Searching Wind (1944)	Lillian Hellman	The Searching Wind (1946)	William Dieterle
The Sea Woman (1925)	Willard Robertson	Why Women Love (1925)	Edwin Carewe
The Second Mrs Tanqueray (1893)	Arthur Wing Pinero	The Second Mrs Tanqueray (1916)	Fred Paul
The Second Mrs Tanqueray (1893)	Arthur Wing Pinero	The Second Wife (1922)	Amleto Palermi
The Second Mrs Tanqueray (1893)	Arthur Wing Pinero	The Second Mrs Tanqueray (1952)	Dallas Bower
The Secretary Bird (1968)	William Douglas Home	Duck in Orange Sauce (1975)	Luciano Salce
The Secret of Polichinelle (1903)	Pierre Wolff	The Secret of Polichinelle (1923)	René Hervil
The Secret of Polichinelle (1903)	Pierre Wolff	The Secret of Polichinelle (1936)	André Berthomieu
The Secret Rapture (1988)	David Hare	The Secret Rapture (1993)	Howard Davies
Secrets (1922)	Rudolf Besier; May Edginton	Secrets (1924)	Frank Borzage
Secrets (1922)	Rudolf Besier; May Edginton	Secrets (1933)	Frank Borzage
See Naples and Die	Elmer Rice	Oh Sailor Behave (1930, musical)	Archie Mayo
Semi-Detached	David Turner	All the Way Up (1970)	James MacTaggart
Send Me No Flowers	Norman Barasch	Send Me No Flowers (1964)	Norman Jewison
Separate Tables (1954)	Terence Rattigan	Separate Tables (1958)	Delbert Mann
Service (1932)	Dodie Smith	Looking Forward (1933)	Clarence Brown
Seven Chances (1916)	Roi Cooper Megrue	Seven Chances (1925)	Buster Keaton
The Bachelor (1999)	Gary Sinyor		
The Seven Descents of Myrtle (1968)	Tennessee Williams	Last of the Mobile Hot Shots (1970)	Sidney Lumet
Seven Keys to Baldpate (1913)	George M. Cohan	Seven Keys to Baldpate (1916)	Monte Luke
Seven Keys to Baldpate (1913)	George M. Cohan	Seven Keys to Baldpate (1917)	Hugh Ford
Seven Keys to Baldpate (1913)	George M. Cohan	Seven Keys to Baldpate (1925)	Fred C. Newmeyer
Seven Keys to Baldpate (1913)	George M. Cohan	Seven Keys to Baldpate (1929)	Reginald Barker
Seven Keys to Baldpate (1913)	George M. Cohan	Seven Keys to Baldpate (1935)	Edward Killy; William Hamilton
Seven Keys to Baldpate (1913)	George M. Cohan	Seven Keys to Baldpate (1947)	Lew Landers
Seven Sisters (1912)	Edith Ellis; Ferenc Herczeg	The Seven Sisters (1915)	Sidney Olcott
Seven Sisters (1912)	Edith Ellis; Ferenc Herczeg	Gyurkovicsarna (1920)	John W. Brunius
Seven Sisters (1912)	Edith Ellis; Ferenc Herczeg	A Sister of Six (1926)	Ragnar Hyltén-Cavallius
Seven Sisters (1912)	Edith Ellis; Ferenc Herczeg	Seven Sweethearts (1942)	Sidney Olcott
Seventeen (1917)	Hugh Stanislaus Stange; Stannard Mears; Stuart Walker	Seventeen (1940)	Booth Tarkington
Seventh Heaven (1922)	Austin Strong	Seventh Heaven (1927)	Frank Borzage
Seventh Heaven (1922)	Austin Strong	Seventh Heaven (1937)	Henry King
The Seven Year Itch (1952)	George Axelrod	The Seven Year Itch (1955)	Billy Wilder
Sextette (1961)	Mae West	Sextette (1978)	Ken Hughes
Sexual Perversity in Chicago (1974)	David Mamet	About Last Night... (1986)	Edward Zwick
Sexual Perversity in Chicago (1974)	David Mamet	About Last Night (2014)	Steve Pink
The Shadow	Gerald Verner	The Shadow (1933)	George A. Cooper
The Shadow Box (1977)	Michael Cristofer	The Shadow Box (1980)	Paul Newman
Shadowlands (1989)	William Nicholson	Shadowlands (1993)	Richard Attenborough
Shadows (1862)	Mikhail Saltykov-Shchedrin	Shadows (1953)	Nikolay Akimov; Nadezhda Kosheverova
The Shadows of a Great City (1884)	Herbert Blaché; Aaron Hoffman	Shadows of a Great City (1913)	Frank Wilson
Sham	Elmer Blaney Harris; Geraldine Bonner	Sham (1921)	Thomas N. Heffron
The Shanghai Gesture	John Colton	The Shanghai Gesture (1941)	Josef von Sternberg
The Shape of Things (2001)	Neil LaBute	The Shape of Things (2003)	Neil LaBute
Shattered Glass	Will D. Lengle; Lew Levenson	24 Hours (1931)	Marion Gering
A Shayna Maidel (1987)	Barbara Lebow	Miss Rose White (1992)	Joseph Sargent
She Has a Name (2011)	Andrew Kooman	She Has a Name (2016)	Daniel Kooman; Matthew Kooman
She Loves Me Not	Howard Lindsay	She Loves Me Not (1934)	Elliott Nugent
She Met Him One Sunday	Victor Skutezky	It Happened One Sunday (1944)	Karel Lamač
Sherlock Holmes	William Gillette; Sir Arthur Conan Doyle	Sherlock Holmes (1922)	Albert Parker
Sherlock Holmes	William Gillette; Sir Arthur Conan Doyle	Sherlock Holmes (1932)	William K. Howard
Sherlock Holmes	William Gillette; Sir Arthur Conan Doyle	The Adventures of Sherlock Holmes (1939)	Alfred L. Werker
The Shining Hour (1934)	Keith Winter	The Shining Hour (1938)	Frank Borzage
Shirley Valentine (1986)	Willy Russell	Shirley Valentine (1989)	Lewis Gilbert
Shoestring	Humphrey Pearson	On with the Show! (1929)	Alan Crosland
Shore Acres (1892)	James A. Herne	Shore Acres (1920)	Rex Ingram; Maxwell Karger
Shore Leave (1922)	Hubert Osborne	Shore Leave (1925)	John S. Robertson
Shore Leave (1922)	Hubert Osborne	Follow the Fleet (1936)	Mark Sandrich
Shooting Star	Basil Thomas	The Great Game (1953)	Maurice Elvey
Short Eyes (1974)	Miguel Piñero	Short Eyes (1977)	Robert M. Young
A Shot in the Dark	Harry Kurnitz	A Shot in the Dark (1964)	Blake Edwards
Show Business	Alex Ruben	Time Out for Rhythm (1941, musical)	Sidney Salkow
The Show-Off (1924)	George Kelly	The Show-Off (1926)	Malcolm St. Clair (filmmaker) Malcolm St. Clair
The Show-Off (1924)	George Kelly	Men Are Like That (1930)	Frank Tuttle
The Show-Off (1924)	George Kelly	The Show-Off (1934)	Charles Reisner
The Show-Off (1924)	George Kelly	The Show-Off (1946)	Harry Beaumont
The Shrike (1952)	Joseph Kramm	The Shrike (1955)	José Ferrer
The Shulamite (1906)	Claude Askew; Edward Knoblock	The Shulamite (1915)	George Loane Tucker
The Shulamite (1906)	Claude Askew; Edward Knoblock	Under the Lash (1921)	Sam Wood
Shut Up! Little Man	Gregg Gibbs	Shut Yer Dirty Little Mouth! (2001)	Robert Taicher
Sick-a-bed (1919)	Ethel Watts Mumford	Sick Abed (1920)	Sam Wood
Siegfried (1928)	Jean Giraudoux	A Double Life (1954)	Victor Vicas
The Sign of the Cross (1895)	Wilson Barrett	The Sign of the Cross (1914 film)	Frederick A. Thomson
The Sign of the Cross (1895)	Wilson Barrett	The Sign of the Cross (1932 film)	Cecil B. DeMille
The Sign on the Door (1919)	Channing Pollock	The Sign on the Door (1921)	Herbert Brenon
The Sign on the Door (1919)	Channing Pollock	The Locked Door (1929)	George Fitzmaurice
Sigurd Braa	Johan Bojer	Sangen til livet (1943)	Leif Sinding
Silence (1924)	Max Marcin	Silence (1931)	Louis J. Gasnier; Max Marcin
The Silent House (1928)	John G. Brandon; George Picke	The Silent House (1929)	Walter Forde
Silent Night, Lonely Night (1959)	Robert Anderson	Silent Night, Lonely Night (1969)	Daniel Petrie
data-sort-value="Silent Voice !" | The Silent Voice	Jules Eckert Goodman	The Silent Voice (1915)	William J. Bowman
data-sort-value="Silent Voice !" | The Silent Voice	Jules Eckert Goodman	The Man Who Played God (1932)	John G. Adolfi
data-sort-value="Silent Voice !" | The Silent Voice	Jules Eckert Goodman	Sincerely Yours (1955)	Gordon Douglas
Silk Stockings (1955)	George S. Kaufman; Leueen MacGrath; Abe Burrows	Silk Stockings (1957)	Rouben Mamoulian
The Silver Cord (1926)	Sidney Howard	The Silver Cord (1933)	John Cromwell
The Silver King (1882)	Henry Arthur Jones; Henry Herman	The Silver King (1929)	T. Hayes Hunter
The Silver Spoon	Henrik Ege	Let's Make a Night of It (1937)	Graham Cutts
Simpatico (1993)	Sam Shepard	Simpatico (1999)	Matthew Warchus
Simon and Laura (1954)	Alan Melville	Simon and Laura (1955)	Muriel Box
Simone (1908)	Eugène Brieux	Simone (1918)	Camille de Morlhon
Simone (1908)	Eugène Brieux	Simone (1926)	Émile-Bernard Donatien
A Single Man (1911)	Hubert Henry Davies	A Single Man (1929)	Harry Beaumont
A Single Woman (2004)	Jeanmarie Simpson	A Single Woman (2008)	Kamala Lopez
Sinners (1915)	Owen Davis	Sinners (1920)	Kenneth Webb
Sissys Brautfahrt	Ernst Décsey; Robert Weil	The King Steps Out (1936)	Josef von Sternberg
Sister Cities	Colette Freedman	Sister Cities (2016)	Sean Hanish
Six Cylinder Love (1921)	William Anthony McGuire	Six Cylinder Love (1923)	Elmer Clifton
Six Cylinder Love (1921)	William Anthony McGuire	Six Cylinder Love (1931)	Thornton Freeland
Six Dance Lessons in Six Weeks (2001)	Richard Alfieri	Six Dance Lessons in Six Weeks (2014)	Arthur Allan Seidelman
Six Degrees of Separation (1990)	John Guare	Six Degrees of Separation (1993)	Fred Schepisi
Sixteen (1934)	Aimée Stuart; Philip Stuart	The Girl Irene (1936)	Reinhold Schünzel
Six Weeks in August	Pamela Herbert Chais	Guess Who's Sleeping in My Bed? (1973)	Theodore J. Flicker
Skidding (1928)	Aurania Rouverol	A Family Affair (1937)	George B. Seitz
The Skin Game (1920)	John Galsworthy	The Skin Game (1921)	B. E. Doxat-Pratt
The Skin Game (1920)	John Galsworthy	The Skin Game (1931)	Alfred Hitchcock
The Skipper Next to God (1945)	Jan de Hartog	Maître après Dieu (1951)	Louis Daquin
Skylark (1939)	Samson Raphaelson	Skylark (1941)	Mark Sandrich
A Sleeping Clergyman (1933)	James Bridie	Flesh and Blood (1951)	Anthony Kimmins
The Sleeping Prince (1953)	Terence Rattigan	The Prince and the Showgirl (1957)	Laurence Olivier
Sleuth (1970)	Anthony Shaffer	Sleuth (1972)	Joseph L. Mankiewicz
Sleuth (1970)	Anthony Shaffer	Sleuth (2007)	Kenneth Branagh
Sleuth (1970)	Anthony Shaffer	Tamanna (2014)	Steven Moore
A Slight Case of Murder (1935)	Damon Runyon; Howard Lindsay	A Slight Case of Murder (1938)	Lloyd Bacon
A Slight Case of Murder (1935)	Damon Runyon; Howard Lindsay	Stop, You're Killing Me (1952)	Roy Del Ruth
Small Hotel (1955)	Rex Frost	Small Hotel (1957)	David MacDonald
Small Miracle (1934)	Norman Krasna	Four Hours to Kill! (1935)	Mitchell Leisen
Smilin' Through (1919)	Jane Cowl; Jane Murfin	Smilin' Through (1922)	Sidney Franklin
Smilin' Through (1919)	Jane Cowl; Jane Murfin	Smilin' Through (1932)	Sidney Franklin
Smilin' Through (1919)	Jane Cowl; Jane Murfin	Smilin' Through (1941)	Frank Borzage
Smith (1909)	W. Somerset Maugham	Smith (1917)	Maurice Elvey
Smoked Glasses (1929)	B. Scott-Elder; William Foster	Blind Man's Bluff (1936)	Albert Parker
The Snow Maiden (1873)	Alexander Ostrovsky	The Snow Maiden (1952)	Ivan Ivanov-Vano; Aleksandra Snezhko-Blotskaya
Snow White and the Seven Dwarfs (1912)	Winthrop Ames (as Jessie Braham White)	Snow White (1916)	J. Searle Dawley
The Sociable Plover (2005)	Tim Whitnall	The Hide (2008)	Marek Losey
Sold	George Erastov	Sold (1915)	Edwin S. Porter; Hugh Ford
A Soldier for Christmas	Reginald Beckwith	This Man Is Mine (1946)	Marcel Varnel
A Soldier's Play (1981)	Charles Fuller	A Soldier's Story (1984)	Norman Jewison
The Solid Gold Cadillac (1953)	George S. Kaufman; Howard Teichmann	The Solid Gold Cadillac (1956)	Richard Quine
The Solitaire Man (1927)	Bella and Samuel Spewack	The Solitaire Man (1933)	Jack Conway
So Long Letty (1916)	Oliver Morosco; Elmer Harris; Earl Carroll	So Long Letty (1920)	Al Christie
So Long Letty (1916)	Oliver Morosco; Elmer Harris; Earl Carroll	So Long Letty (1929)	Lloyd Bacon
Some Kind of Love Story (1982)	Arthur Miller	Everybody Wins (1990)	Karel Reisz
Someone at the Door (1935)	Dorothy Christie; Campbell Christie	Someone at the Door (1936)	Herbert Brenon
Someone at the Door (1935)	Dorothy Christie; Campbell Christie	Someone at the Door (1950)	Francis Searle
Someone Waiting (1953)	Emlyn Williams	Time Without Pity (1957)	Joseph Losey
Some Other Love (1962)	William Fairchild	Do Not Disturb (1965)	Ralph Levy; George Marshall
Something About a Sailor	Earle Couttie	Watch Your Stern (1960)	Gerald Thomas
Something to Brag About (1925)	Edgar Selwyn; William LeBaron	Baby Face Harrington (1935)	Raoul Walsh
Some Voices (1994)	Joe Penhall	Some Voices (2000)	Simon Cellan Jones
The Son-Daughter (1919)	George Scarborough; David Belasco	The Son-Daughter (1932)	Clarence Brown; Robert Z. Leonard
The Song and Dance Man (1923)	George M. Cohan	The Song and Dance Man (1926)	Herbert Brenon
The Song and Dance Man (1923)	George M. Cohan	Song and Dance Man (1936)	Allan Dwan
The Song of Songs (1914)	Edward Sheldon	The Song of Songs (1918)	Joseph Kaufman
The Song of Songs (1914)	Edward Sheldon	Lily of the Dust (1924)	Dimitri Buchowetzki
The Song of Songs (1914)	Edward Sheldon	The Song of Songs (1933)	Rouben Mamoulian
Song of the Flame (1925)	Oscar Hammerstein II; Otto A. Harbach	Song of the Flame (1930)	Alan Crosland
Sonny (1920)	George V. Hobart; Raymond Hubbell	Sonny (1922)	Henry King
The Sons of the Marquis Lucera (1935)	Gherardo Gherardi	The Sons of the Marquis Lucera (1939)	Amleto Palermi
Sons O' Guns (1929)	Fred Thompson; Jack Donahue	Sons O' Guns (1936)	Lloyd Bacon
Sordid Lives (1996)	Del Shores	Sordid Lives (2000)	Del Shores
Sorry You've Been Troubled (1929)	Walter Hackett	One New York Night (1935)	Jack Conway
S.O.S.	Walter Ellis	Her Last Affaire (1935)	Michael Powell
S.O.S.	Walter Ellis	S.O.S. (1928)	Leslie S. Hiscott
So This Is London (1922)	Arthur Goodrich	So This Is London (1930)	John G. Blystone
So This Is London (1922)	Arthur Goodrich	So This Is London (1939)	Thornton Freeland
So This is Love (1928)	Stanley Lupino	Lucky to Me (1939)	Thomas Bentley
Soubrette (1938)	Jacques Deval	Say It in French (1938)	Andrew L. Stone
A Sound of Hunting (1945)	Harry Brown	Eight Iron Men (1952)	Edward Dmytryk
The Sound of Murder (1959)	William Fairchild	The Last Shot You Hear (1969)	Gordon Hessler
Souris d'hôtel	Paul Armont; Marcel Gerbidon	The Hotel Mouse (1923)	Fred Paul
Southern Baptist Sissies (2000)	Del Shores	Southern Baptist Sissies (2013)	Del Shores
Sowing the Wind (1893)	Sydney Grundy	Sowing the Wind (1916)	Cecil Hepworth
Sowing the Wind (1893)	Sydney Grundy	Sowing the Wind (1921)	John M. Stahl
The Spanish Fly (1913)	Franz Arnold; Ernst Bach	The Spanish Fly (1931)	Georg Jacoby
The Spanish Fly (1913)	Franz Arnold; Ernst Bach	The Spanish Fly (1955)	Carl Boese
Speakeasy (1927)	George Rosener; Edward Knoblock	Speakeasy (1929)	Benjamin Stoloff
Speaking In Tongues	Andrew Bovell	Lantana (2001)	Ray Lawrence
Speech & Debate (2006)	Stephen Karam	Speech & Debate (2017)	Dan Harris
The Spendthrift (1834)	Ferdinand Raimund	The Spendthrift (1917)	Jacob Fleck; Luise Fleck
The Spendthrift (1834)	Ferdinand Raimund	The Spendthrift (1953)	Leopold Hainisch
The Spendthrift (1834)	Ferdinand Raimund	The Spendthrift (1964)	Kurt Meisel
Spider's Web (1954)	Agatha Christie	The Spider's Web (1960)	Godfrey Grayson
Splinters	Lee-Anne Poole	Splinters (2018)	Thom Fitzgerald
Spofford (1967)	Herman Shumlin	Reuben, Reuben (1983)	Robert Ellis Miller
The Sport of Kings (1924)	Ian Hay	The Sport of Kings (1931)	Victor Saville
Sporting Life	Seymour Hicks; Cecil Raleigh	Sporting Life (1918)	Maurice Tourneur
Sporting Life	Seymour Hicks; Cecil Raleigh	Sporting Life (1925)	Maurice Tourneur
A Spot of Bother	Vernon Sylvaine	A Spot of Bother (1938)	David MacDonald
Sprawa Moniki (1932)	Maria Morozowicz-Szczepkowska	Dr. Monica (1934)	William Keighley
Spring and Port Wine (1959)	Bill Naughton	Spring and Port Wine (1970)	Peter Hammond
Spring Awakening (1891)	Frank Wedekind	Spring Awakening (1924)	Jacob Fleck; Luise Fleck
Spring Cleaning (1923)	Frederick Lonsdale	The Fast Set (1924)	William C. deMille
Women Who Play (1932)	Arthur Rosson		
Spring Dance (1936)	Philip Barry	Spring Madness (1938)	S. Sylvan Simon
Spring Fever (1925)	Vincent Lawrence	Spring Fever (1927)	Edward Sedgwick
Spring Meeting (1938)	Molly Keane (as M.J. Farrell); John Perry	Spring Meeting (1941)	Walter Mycroft
Springtime for Henry (1931)	Benn W. Levy	Springtime for Henry (1934)	Frank Tuttle
The Squall (1926)	Jean Bart	The Squall (1929)	Alexander Korda
Square Crooks (1926)	James P. Judge	Square Crooks (1928)	Lewis Seiler
Square Crooks (1926)	James P. Judge	Baby Take a Bow (1934)	Harry Lachman
A Square Peg (1923)	Lewis Beach	The Denial (1925)	Hobart Henley
The Square Ring (1952)	Ralph Peterson	The Square Ring (1953)	Basil Dearden
The Squatter's Daughter (1907)	Bert Bailey; Edmund Duggan	The Squatter's Daughter (1910)	Bert Bailey
The Squaw Man (1905)	Edwin Milton Royle	The Squaw Man (1914)	Cecil B. DeMille; Oscar C. Apfel
The Squaw Man (1905)	Edwin Milton Royle	The Squaw Man (1918)	Cecil B. DeMille
The Squaw Man (1905)	Edwin Milton Royle	The Squaw Man (1931)	Cecil B. DeMille
The Squeaker (1928)	Edgar Wallace	The Squeaker (1930)	Edgar Wallace
The Squeaker (1928)	Edgar Wallace	The Squeaker (1931)	Martin Frič; Karel Lamač
The Squeaker (1928)	Edgar Wallace	The Squeaker (1937)	William K. Howard
The Squeaker (1928)	Edgar Wallace	The Squeaker (1963)	Alfred Vohrer
Stage Door (1936)	Edna Ferber; George S. Kaufman	Stage Door (1937)	Gregory La Cava
Staircase (1966)	Charles Dyer	Staircase (1969)	Stanley Donen
Stalag 17 (1951)	Donald Bevan; Edmund Trzcinski	Stalag 17 (1953)	Billy Wilder
Stamboul (1931)	Pierre Frondaie	Stamboul (1932)	Dimitri Buchowetzki
The Star-Spangled Girl (1966)	Neil Simon	Star Spangled Girl (1971)	Jerry Paris
State of the Union (1945)	Russel Crouse; Howard Lindsay	State of the Union (1948)	Frank Capra
Steaming (1981)	Nell Dunn	Steaming (1985)	Joseph Losey
Steel Magnolias (1987)	Robert Harling	Steel Magnolias (1987)	Herbert Ross
Steel Magnolias (1987)	Robert Harling	Steel Magnolias (2012)	Kenny Leon
Stepping Out (1929)	Elmer Blaney Harris	Stepping Out (1931)	Charles Reisner
Stevie	Hugh Whitemore	Stevie (1978)	Robert Enders
Still Life (1936)	Noël Coward	Brief Encounter (1945)	David Lean
Still Life (1936)	Noël Coward	Brief Encounter (1974)	Alan Bridges
Stöpsel (1926)	Franz Arnold; Ernst Bach	A Warm Corner (1930)	Victor Saville
Stop That Man (1918)	George V. Hobart	Stop That Man! (1928)	Nat Ross
Storken (1929)	Thit Jensen	The Burning Question (1943)	Alice O'Fredericks
Storm in a Teacup (1936)	James Bridie	Storm in a Teacup (1937)	Ian Dalrymple
Straight-Jacket (2000)	Richard Day	Straight-Jacket (2004)	Richard Day
The Straight Road (1907)	Clyde Fitch	The Straight Road (1914)	Allan Dwan
Strange Interlude (1928)	Eugene O'Neill	Strange Interlude (1932)	Robert Z. Leonard
Streamers (1976)	David Rabe	Streamers (1983)	Robert Altman
data-sort-value="Streetcar Named Desire !" | A Streetcar Named Desire (1947)	Tennessee Williams	A Streetcar Named Desire (1951)	Elia Kazan
data-sort-value="Streetcar Named Desire !" | A Streetcar Named Desire (1947)	Tennessee Williams	Streetcar Named Desire|A Streetcar Named Desire (1984)	John Erman
data-sort-value="Streetcar Named Desire !" | A Streetcar Named Desire (1947)	Tennessee Williams	Streetcar Named Desire|A Streetcar Named Desire (1995)	Glenn Jordan
Street Scene (1929)	Elmer Rice	Street Scene (1931)	King Vidor
The Streets of London (1864)	Dion Boucicault	The Streets of London (1929)	Norman Lee
The Streets of London (1864)	Dion Boucicault	The Streets of London (1934)	F. W. Thring
Strictly Ballroom (1984)	Baz Luhrmann	Strictly Ballroom (1993)	Baz Luhrmann
Strictly Dishonorable (1929)	Preston Sturges	Strictly Dishonorable (1931)	John M. Stahl
Strictly Dishonorable (1929)	Preston Sturges	Strictly Dishonorable (1951)	Melvin Frank; Norman Panama
The String of Pearls, or The Fiend of Fleet Street (1847)	George Dibdin-Pitt	Sweeney Todd (1928)	Walter West
The Stubbornness of Geraldine	Clyde Fitch	The Stubbornness of Geraldine (1915)	Gaston Mervale
The Subject Was Roses (1964)	Frank D. Gilroy	The Subject Was Roses (1968)	Ulu Grosbard
¡Sublime decisión! (1955)	Miguel Mihura	For Men Only (1960)	Fernando Fernán Gómez
The Substance of Fire (1991)	Jon Robin Baitz	The Substance of Fire (1996)	
The Suburban (1903)	Charles T. Dazey	The Kentucky Derby (1922)	King Baggot
Suburban Motel (1997)	George F. Walker	Niagara Motel (2005)	Gary Yates
SubUrbia (1994)	Eric Bogosian	SubUrbia (1996)	Richard Linklater
Success Story (1932)	John Howard Lawson	Success at Any Price (1934)	J. Walter Ruben
Successful Calamity''A Successful Calamity'' (1917)	Clare Kummer	A Successful Calamity (1932)	John G. Adolfi
Such a Little Queen (1909)	Channing Pollock	Such a Little Queen (1914)	Edwin S. Porter; Hugh Ford
Suddenly Last Summer (1958)	Tennessee Williams	Suddenly, Last Summer (1959)	Joseph L. Mankiewicz
Summer and Smoke (1948)	Tennessee Williams	Summer and Smoke (1961)	Peter Glenville
Summer Lightning	Ernest Denny	Troublesome Wives (1928)	Harry Hughes
Summer of the Seventeenth Doll (1955)	Ray Lawler	Summer of the Seventeenth Doll (1959)	Leslie Norman
Summertree	Ron Cowen	Summertree (1971)	Anthony Newley
The Sum of Us (1990)	David Stevens	The Sum of Us (1994)	Kevin Dowling; Geoff Burton
Sunday in New York (1961)	Norman Krasna	Sunday in New York (1963)	Peter Tewksbury
The Sunny South (1883)	George Darrell	The Sunny South or The Whirlwind of Fate (1915)	Alfred Rolfe
Sunrise at Campobello (1958)	Dore Schary	Sunrise at Campobello (1960)	Vincent J. Donehue
The Sunset Limited (2006)	Cormac McCarthy	The Sunset Limited (2011)	Tommy Lee Jones
The Sunshine Boys (1972)	Neil Simon	The Sunshine Boys (1975)	Herbert Ross
The Sunshine Boys (1972)	Neil Simon	The Sunshine Boys (1996 film) (TV)	John Erman
Super of the Gaiety	Alfred Savoir	His Tiger Lady (1928)	Hobart Henley
Susan (1951)	Steve Fisher; Alex Gottlieb	Susan Slept Here (1954)	Frank Tashlin
Susan and God	Rachel Crothers	Susan and God (1940)	George Cukor
data-sort-value="Swan !" | The Swan (1920)	Ferenc Molnár	The Swan (1925)	Dimitri Buchowetzki
data-sort-value="Swan !" | The Swan (1920)	Ferenc Molnár	One Romantic Night (1930)	David Burton
data-sort-value="Swan !" | The Swan (1920)	Ferenc Molnár	data-sort-value="''The Swan'' !" | [[The Swan]] (1956)	Charles Vidor
Sweet Aloes (1934)	Jay Mallory	Give Me Your Heart (1936)	Archie Mayo
Sweet Bird of Youth (1959)	Tennessee Williams	Sweet Bird of Youth (1962)	Richard Brooks
Sweet Bird of Youth (1959)	Tennessee Williams	Sweet Bird of Youth (1989)	Nicolas Roeg
Sweet Kitty Bellairs (1903)	David Belasco	Sweet Kitty Bellairs (1916)	James Young (director)
Sweet Kitty Bellairs (1903)	David Belasco	Sweet Kitty Bellairs (1930)	Alfred E. Green
Sweet Lavender (1888)	Arthur Wing Pinero	Sweet Lavender (1915)	Cecil M. Hepworth
Sweet Lavender (1888)	Arthur Wing Pinero	Sweet Lavender (1920)	Paul Powell
Sweet Nothing in My Ear (1998)	Stephen Sachs	Sweet Nothing in My Ear (2008, TV)	Joseph Sargent
Sweet November	Herman Raucher	Sweet November (1968)	Robert Ellis Miller
Sweet November	Herman Raucher	Sweet November (2001)	Pat O'Connor
Swimming to Cambodia (1985)	Spalding Gray	Swimming to Cambodia (1987)	Jonathan Demme
Swing Your Lady (1936)	Kenyon Nicholson; Charles Robinson	Swing Your Lady (1938)	Ray Enright
Szinmü négy felvon (1917)	Lajos Bíró	Five Graves to Cairo (1943)	Billy Wilder

=== T ===
Play	Playwright	Film	Film director
Tabitha (1956)	Arnold Ridley; Mary Cathcart Borer	Who Killed the Cat? (1966)	Montgomery Tully
Take a Chance (1931)	Walter Hackett	Take a Chance (1937)	Sinclair Hill
Take a Giant Step (1953)	Louis S. Peterson	Take a Giant Step (1959)	Philip Leacock
Take Her, She's Mine (1961)	Henry Ephron; Phoebe Ephron	Take Her, She's Mine (1963)	Henry Koster
Taking Sides (1995)	Ronald Harwood	Taking Sides (2001)	István Szabó
A Talent for Murder (1981)	Jerome Chodorov; Norman Panama	A Talent for Murder (1983)	Alvin Rakoff
Tales from the Vienna Woods (1931)	Ödön von Horváth	Tales from the Vienna Woods (1979)	Maximilian Schell
Talk Radio (1987)	Eric Bogosian	Talk Radio (1988)	Oliver Stone
Tall Story (1959)	Russel Crouse; Howard Lindsay	Tall Story (1960)	Joshua Logan
Talleyrand (1948)	Sacha Guitry	The Lame Devil (1948)	Sacha Guitry
The Taming of the Shrew (c. 1590–1592)	William Shakespeare	The Taming of the Shrew (1929)	Sam Taylor
The Taming of the Shrew (c. 1590–1592)	William Shakespeare	The Taming of the Shrew (1967)	Franco Zeffirelli
The Taming of the Shrew (c. 1590–1592)	William Shakespeare	10 Things I Hate About You (1999)	Gil Junger
Tangos & Tragédias	Hique Gomez; Nico Nicolaiewsky.	Até que a Sbórnia nos Separe (2013)	Otto Guerra
Tante Jutta aus Kalkutta	Otto Schwartz; Max Reimann	Tante Jutta aus Kalkutta (1953)	Karl Georg Külb
Tape (1999)	Stephen Belber	Tape (2001)	Richard Linklater
Tarnish (1923)	Gilbert Emery	Tarnish (1924)	George Fitzmaurice
Tartuffe (1664)	Molière	Tartuffe (1926)	F. W. Murnau
Tartuffe (1664)	Molière	Tartuffe (1965)	Henri Safran
Tartuffe (1664)	Molière	Le tartuffe (1984)	Gérard Depardieu
A Taste of Honey (1958)	Shelagh Delaney	A Taste of Honey (1961)	Tony Richardson
Tchin-Tchin (1959)	François Billetdoux	A Fine Romance (1991)	Gene Saks
Tea and Sympathy (1953)	Robert Anderson	Tea and Sympathy (1956)	Vincente Minnelli
The Teahouse of the August Moon (1953)	John Patrick	The Teahouse of the August Moon (1956)	Daniel Mann
Tectonic Plates (1990)	Robert Lepage	Tectonic Plates (1992)	Peter Mettler
Television	Howard Irving Young	Television (1931)	Charles de Rochefort
Television	Howard Irving Young	De Sensatie van de Toekomst (1931)	Dimitri Buchowetzki; Jack Salvatori
A Templom Egere (1927)	Ladislas Fodor	Beauty and the Boss (1932)	Roy Del Ruth
A Temporary Gentleman (1919)	H. F. Maltby	A Temporary Gentleman (1920)	Fred W. Durrant
The Tender Trap (1954)	Max Shulman; Robert Paul Smith	The Tender Trap (1955)	Charles Walters
Ten Minute Alibi (1933)	Anthony Armstrong	Ten Minute Alibi (1935)	Bernard Vorhaus
The Tenth Man (1910)	W. Somerset Maugham	The Tenth Man (1936)	Brian Desmond Hurst
data-sort-value="Terror !" | The Terror (1927)	Edgar Wallace	The Terror (1928)	Roy Del Ruth
data-sort-value="Terror !" | The Terror (1927)	Edgar Wallace	Return of the Terror (1934)	Howard Bretherton
data-sort-value="Terror !" | The Terror (1927)	Edgar Wallace	The Terror (1938)	Richard Bird
Testőr (1911)	Ferenc Molnár	The Guardsman (1925)	Robert Wiene
Testőr (1911)	Ferenc Molnár	The Guardsman (1931)	Sidney Franklin
Testőr (1911)	Ferenc Molnár	His Wife's Lover (1931)	Sidney M. Goldin
Testőr (1911)	Ferenc Molnár	The Chocolate Soldier (1941)	Roy Del Ruth
Testőr (1911)	Ferenc Molnár	Lily in Love (1984)	Károly Makk
A Texas Steer (1890)	Charles H. Hoyt	A Texas Steer (1927)	Richard Wallace
Thank You (1921)	Winchell Smith; Tom Cushing	Thank You (1925)	John Ford
Thark (1927)	Ben Travers	Thark (1932)	Tom Walls
That Championship Season (1972)	Jason Miller	That Championship Season (1982)	Jason Miller
That Good Night (1996)	N. J. Crisp	That Good Night (2017)	Eric Styles
That's a Good Girl	Douglas Furber	That's a Good Girl (1933)	Jack Buchanan
Théodora (1884),	Victorien Sardou	Theodora (1921)	Leopoldo Carlucci
There Goes the Bride (1973)	John Chapman; Ray Cooney	There Goes the Bride (1980)	Terry Marcel
There Shall Be No Night (1940)	Robert E. Sherwood	There Shall Be No Night (1957)	George Schaefer
There's Always Juliet (1931)	John Van Druten	One Night in Lisbon (1941)	Edward H. Griffith
There You Are!	F. Hugh Herbert	There You Are! (1926)	Edward Sedgwick
These Girls	Vivienne Laxdal	These Girls (2005)	John Hazlett
They All Want Something (1926)	Courtenay Savage	What a Man (1930)	George Crone
They All Want Something (1926)	Courtenay Savage	Merrily We Live (1938)	Norman Z. McLeod
They Came by Night	Barré Lyndon	They Came by Night (1940)	Harry Lachman
They Came to a City (1943)	J. B. Priestley	They Came to a City (1944)	Basil Dearden
They Knew What They Wanted (1924)	Sidney Howard	The Secret Hour (1928)	Garson Kanin
They Knew What They Wanted (1924)	Sidney Howard	A Lady to Love (1930)	Victor Sjöström
They Knew What They Wanted (1924)	Sidney Howard	They Knew What They Wanted (1940)	Rowland V. Lee
They Might Be Giants (1961)	James Goldman	They Might Be Giants (1971)	Anthony Harvey
Thieves (1974)	Herb Gardner	Thieves (1977)	John Berry
Third Time Lucky	Arnold Ridley	Third Time Lucky (1931)	Walter Forde
The Thirteenth Chair (1916)	Bayard Veiller	The Thirteenth Chair (1919)	Léonce Perret
The Thirteenth Chair (1916)	Bayard Veiller	The Thirteenth Chair (1929)	Tod Browning
The Thirteenth Chair (1916)	Bayard Veiller	The Thirteenth Chair (1937)	George B. Seitz
Thirty Days	Clayton Hamilton; A. E. Thomas	Thirty Days (1922)	James Cruze
The Third Degree (1909)	Charles Klein	The Third Degree (1913)	Barry O'Neil
The Third Degree (1909)	Charles Klein	The Third Degree (1919)	Tom Terriss
The Third Degree (1909)	Charles Klein	The Third Degree (1926)	Michael Curtiz
This Happy Breed (1942)	Noël Coward	This Happy Breed (1944)	David Lean
This is Mary's Chair	Frank King	Death of an Angel (1952)	Charles Saunders
This Is New York (1930)	Robert E. Sherwood	Two Kinds of Women (1932)	William C. deMille
This Property Is Condemned (1946)	Tennessee Williams	This Property Is Condemned (1966)	Sydney Pollack
This Story of Yours (1968)	John Hopkins	The Offence (1973)	Sidney Lumet
This Thing Called Love (1928)	Edwin J. Burke	This Thing Called Love (1929 film)	Paul L. Stein
This Thing Called Love (1928)	Edwin J. Burke	This Thing Called Love (1940 film)	Alexander Hall
This Was a Woman	Joan Morgan	This Was a Woman (1948)	Tim Whelan
This Woman and This Man (1909)	Avery Hopwood	Guilty of Love (1920)	Harley Knoles
Those Endearing Young Charms	Edward Chodorov	Those Endearing Young Charms (1945)	Lewis Allen
Those We Love	George Abbott; S. K. Lauren	Those We Love (1932)	Robert Florey
A Thousand Clowns (1962)	Herb Gardner	A Thousand Clowns (1965)	Fred Coe
The Three Bears	Edward Childs Carpenter	Three Men and a Girl (1919)	Marshall Neilan
Three Blind Mice	Stephen Powys	Three Blind Mice (1938)	William A. Seiter
Three Blind Mice	Stephen Powys	Moon Over Miami (1941)	Walter Lang
Three Blind Mice	Stephen Powys	Three Little Girls in Blue (1946)	H. Bruce Humberstone
Three-Cornered Moon (1933)	Gertrude Friedberg	Three-Cornered Moon (1933)	Elliott Nugent
Three Faces East (1918)	Anthony Paul Kelly	Three Faces East (1926)	Rupert Julian
Three Faces East (1918)	Anthony Paul Kelly	Three Faces East (1930)	Roy Del Ruth
Three Faces East (1918)	Anthony Paul Kelly	British Intelligence (1940)	Terry O. Morse
Three Live Ghosts (1920)	Frederic S. Isham; Max Marcin	Three Live Ghosts (1922)	George Fitzmaurice
The Three Masks (1908)	Charles Méré	The Three Masks (1929)	André Hugon
Three Men on a Horse (1935)	John Cecil Holm; George Abbott	Three Men on a Horse (1936)	Mervyn LeRoy
Three Men on a Horse (1935)	John Cecil Holm; George Abbott	Drei Mann auf einem Pferd (1957)	Kurt Meisel
The Three of Us (1906)	Rachel Crothers	The Three of Us (1914)	John W. Noble
Three's a Family (1943)	Henry Ephron; Phoebe Ephron	Three Is a Family (1944)	Edward Ludwig
Three Sisters (1901)	Anton Chekov	The Three Sisters (1966)	Paul Bogart
Three Sisters (1901)	Anton Chekov	The Three Sisters (1970, TV)	Cedric Messina
Three Sisters (1901)	Anton Chekov	Three Sisters (1970)	Laurence Olivier
Three Sisters (1901)	Anton Chekov	Faces of Love (1977)	Michel Soutter
Three Sisters (1901)	Anton Chekov	Love and Fear (1988)	Margarethe von Trotta
Three Sisters (1901)	Anton Chekov	Three Sisters (1994)	Sergei Solovyov
Three Sisters (1901)	Anton Chekov	The Sisters (2005)	Arthur Allan Seidelman
Three Wise Fools (1918)	Winchell Smith	Three Wise Fools (1923)	King Vidor
Three Wise Fools (1918)	Winchell Smith	Three Wise Fools (1946)	Edward Buzzell
Thunder Rock (1939)	Robert Ardrey	Thunder Rock (1942)	Roy Boulting
Thunderstorm (1933)	Cao Yu	The Thunderstorm (1957)	Ng Wui
Thunderstorm (1933)	Cao Yu	Curse of the Golden Flower (2006)	Zhang Yimou
The Tiger (1963)	Murray Schisgal	The Tiger Makes Out (1967)	Arthur Hiller
The Tiger Lady	Sidney Toler	The Bait (1921)	Maurice Tourneur
Tiger Rose (1917)	nWillard Mack; David Belasco	Tiger Rose (1923)	Sidney Franklin
Tiger Rose (1917)	nWillard Mack; David Belasco	Tiger Rose (1929)	George Fitzmaurice
Tillie's Nightmare (1910)	A. Baldwin Sloane; Edgar Smith	Tillie's Punctured Romance (1914)	Mack Sennett
Tilly of Bloomsbury (1919)	Ian Hay	Tilly of Bloomsbury (1921)	Rex Wilson
Tilly of Bloomsbury (1919)	Ian Hay	Tilly of Bloomsbury (1931)	Jack Raymond
Tilly of Bloomsbury (1919)	Ian Hay	Tilly of Bloomsbury (1940)	Leslie S. Hiscott
Til Sæters: dramatisk Idyl med Sange (1850)	Claus Pavels Riis	Til sæters (1924)	Harry Ivarson
Time Limit (1956)	Henry Denker	Time Limit (1957)	Karl Malden
The Time of the Cuckoo (1952)	Arthur Laurents	Summertime (1955)	David Lean
The Time of Your Life (1939)	H. C. Potter	The Time of Your Life (1948)	William Saroyan
The Time of Your Life (1939)	H. C. Potter	The Time of Your Life (1958)	Tom Donovan
Time Out for Ginger	Ronald Alexander	Billie (1965)	Don Weis
Tin Pan Alley (1928)	Hugh Stanislaus Stange	New York Nights (1929)	Lewis Milestone
Tinsel Girl (1931)	Maurine Dallas Watkins	The Strange Love of Molly Louvain (1932)	Michael Curtiz
Tip-Toes (1925)	Guy Bolton; Fred Thompson	Tip Toes (1927)	Herbert Wilcox
Tire au flanc! (1904)	André Mouëzy-Éon	The Army Game (1961)	André Mouëzy-Éon; André Sylvane
'Tis Pity She's a Whore (1633)	John Ford	'Tis Pity She's a Whore (film) (1971)	Giuseppe Patroni Griffi
A Toast to Melba (1976)	Jack Hibberd	A Toast to Melba (1980)	Alan Burke
Tobacco Road (1933)	Jack Kirkland	Tobacco Road (1941)	Nunnally Johnson
Toby's Bow (1919)	John Taintor Foote	Toby's Bow (1919)	Harry Beaumont
Today (1913)	George Broadhurst; Abraham S. Schomer	To-Day (1917)	Ralph Ince
Todo bicho de uña	Román Chalbaud	Cuchillos de fuego (1989)	Román Chalbaud
To Dorothy, a Son (1950)	Roger MacDougall	To Dorothy a Son (1954)	Muriel Box
To Gillian on Her 37th Birthday (1984)	Michael Brady	To Gillian on Her 37th Birthday (1996)	Michael Pressman
To Have and to Hold	Lionel Browne	To Have and to Hold (1951)	Godfrey Grayson
Tom & Viv (1984)	Michael Hastings	Tom & Viv (1994)	Brian Gilbert
Tom at the Farm (2011)	Michel Marc Bouchard	Tom at the Farm (2013)	Xavier Dolan
Tommy	Howard Lindsay; Bertrand Robinson	She's My Weakness (1930)	Melville W. Brown
Tommy Atkins	Ben Landeck; Arthur Shirley	Tommy Atkins (1915)	Bert Haldane
Tommy Atkins	Ben Landeck; Arthur Shirley	Tommy Atkins (1928)	Norman Walker
Tomorrow (1968)	Horton Foote	Tomorrow (1972)	Joseph Anthony
Tomorrow and Tomorrow (1931)	Philip Barry	Tomorrow and Tomorrow (1932)	Richard Wallace
Tomorrow, the World!	James Gow; Arnaud d'Usseau	Tomorrow, the World! (1944)	Leslie Fenton
The Tongues of Men (1913)	Edward Childs Carpenter	The Tongues of Men (1916)	Frank Lloyd
Tonight at 8.30 (1936)	Noël Coward	Meet Me Tonight (1952)	Anthony Pelissier
Tonight or Never	Lili Hatvany	Tonight or Never (1931)	Mervyn LeRoy
Tons of Money (1922)	Will Evans; Arthur Valentine	Tons of Money (1924)	Frank Hall Crane
Tons of Money (1930)	Tom Walls		
To Oblige a Lady (1930)	Edgar Wallace	To Oblige a Lady (1931)	H. Manning Haynes
Tony Draws a Horse (1938)	Lesley Storm	Tony Draws a Horse (1950)	John Paddy Carstairs
Too Much Johnson	William Gillette	Too Much Johnson (1919)	Donald Crisp
Too Much Johnson	William Gillette	Too Much Johnson (1938)	Orson Welles
Toothpaste and Cigars (2004)	TJ Dawe	The F Word (2013)	Michael Dowse
Topaze (1928)	Marcel Pagnol	Topaze (1933)	D'Abbadie D'Arrast
Topaze (1928)	Marcel Pagnol	Topaze (1933)	Louis J. Gasnier
Topaze (1928)	Marcel Pagnol	Topaze (1951)	Marcel Pagnol
Topaze (1928)	Marcel Pagnol	Mr. Topaze (1961)	Peter Sellers
The Torch-Bearers (1922)	George Kelly	Doubting Thomas (1935)	David Butler
The Torch-Bearers (1922)	George Kelly	Too Busy to Work (1939)	Otto Brower
Torch Song (1930)	Kenyon Nicholson	Laughing Sinners (1931)	Harry Beaumont
Torch Song Trilogy (1981)	Harvey Fierstein	Torch Song Trilogy (1988)	Paul Bogart
To the Ladies (1922)	George S. Kaufman; Marc Connelly	To the Ladies (1923)	James Cruze
Touch It Light (1960)	Robert Storey	Light Up the Sky! (1960)	Lewis Gilbert
Tovarich (1933)	Jacques Deval	Tovarich (1937)	Anatole Litvak
Tovarich (1933)	Jacques Deval	Tovaritch (1935)	Jacques Deval; Germain Fried
Toys in the Attic (1960)	Lillian Hellman	Toys in the Attic (1963)	George Roy Hill
The Tragedy of Man (1861)	Imre Madách	The Annunciation (1984)	András Jeles
The Tragedy of Man (1861)	Imre Madách	The Tragedy of Man (2011)	Marcell Jankovics
The Trail of the Lonesome Pine (1912)	Eugene Walter	The Trail of the Lonesome Pine (1916)	Cecil B. DeMille
The Trail of the Lonesome Pine (1912)	Eugene Walter	The Trail of the Lonesome Pine (1923)	Charles Maigne
The Train for Venice (1937)	Georges Berr; Louis Verneuil	The Train for Venice (1938)	André Berthomieu
The Train for Venice (1937)	Georges Berr; Louis Verneuil	My Life with Caroline (1941)	Lewis Milestone
Trämålning	Ingmar Bergman	The Seventh Seal (1957)	Ingmar Bergman
The Traveling Lady (1954)	Horton Foote	Baby the Rain Must Fall (1965)	Robert Mulligan
The Traveling Salesman	James Forbes	The Traveling Salesman (1916)	Joseph Kaufman
The Traveling Salesman	James Forbes	The Traveling Salesman (1921)	Joseph Henabery
Traveller's Joy (1948)	Arthur Macrae	Traveller's Joy (1949)	Ralph Thomas
Travelling North (1979)	David Williamson	Travelling North (1987)	Carl Schultz
Treasure Hunt (1949)	Molly Keane	Treasure Hunt (1952)	John Paddy Carstairs
Treize à table (1953)	Marc-Gilbert Sauvajon	Thirteen at the Table (1955)	André Hunebelle
Trelawny of the "Wells"	Arthur Wing Pinero	Trelawny of the Wells (1916)	Cecil Hepworth
Trelawny of the "Wells"	Arthur Wing Pinero	The Actress (1928)	Sidney Franklin
The Trial of Mary Dugan (1927)	Bayard Veiller	The Trial of Mary Dugan (1929)	Bayard Veiller
The Trial of Mary Dugan (1927)	Bayard Veiller	The Trial of Mary Dugan (1931)	Gregorio Martínez Sierra; Marcel De Sano
The Trial of Mary Dugan (1927)	Bayard Veiller	The Trial of Mary Dugan (1941)	Norman Z. McLeod
The Trials and Tribulations of a Trailer Trash Housewife (2009)	Del Shores	Blues for Willadean (2012)	Del Shores
Tribute (1978)	Bernard Slade	Tribute (1980)	Bob Clark
The Trip to Bountiful (1953)	Horton Foote	The Trip to Bountiful (1985)	Peter Masterson
A Trip to Chinatown (1891)	Charles H. Hoyt	A Trip to Chinatown (1926)	Robert P. Kerr
Trīspadsmitā (1966)	Gunārs Priede	Four White Shirts (1967)	Rolands Kalniņš
Tristi Amori	Giuseppe Giacosa	Sad Loves (1943)	Carmine Gallone
The Triumph of Love (1732)	Pierre de Marivaux	Triumph of Love (2001)	Clare Peploe
Trois garçons, une fille	Roger Ferdinand	Three Boys, One Girl (1948)	Maurice Labro
The Trojan Women (415 BCE)	Euripides	The Trojan Women (1971)	Michael Cacoyannis
Tropfen auf heiße Steine (1966)	Rainer Werner Fassbinder	Water Drops on Burning Rocks (2000)	François Ozon
Tropical Twins (Unpublished)	Maxwell Anderson; Lawrence Stallings	The Cock-Eyed World (1929)	Raoul Walsh
Trunk Crime (1939)	Reginald Denham	Trunk Crime (1939)	Roy Boulting
Trust Berkeley (1933)	Cyril Campion	Adventure Ltd. (1935)	George King
The Truth Game (1928)	Ivor Novello	But the Flesh Is Weak (1932)	Jack Conway
The Truth Game (1928)	Ivor Novello	Free and Easy (1941)	George Sidney
Tu m'épouseras	Louis Verneuil	Get Your Man (1927)	Dorothy Arzner
Tu m'épouseras	Get Your Man (1934)	Get Your Man (1927)	George King
The Tunnel of Love (1957)	Joseph Fields; Peter De Vries	The Tunnel of Love (1958)	Gene Kelly
Turandot (1762)	Count Carlo Gozzi	Turandot, Princess of China (1935)	Gerhard Lamprecht
Turkey Time (1931)	Ben Travers	Turkey Time (1933)	Tom Walls
Turn to the Right (1916)	Winchell Smith; John E. Hazzard	Turn to the Right (1922)	Rex Ingram
Tűzmadár (1932)	Lajos Zilahy	The Firebird (1934)	William Dieterle
Tűzmadár (1932)	Lajos Zilahy	The Open Door (1957)	César Fernández Ardavín
Twelve Miles Out (1925)	William Anthony McGuire	Twelve Miles Out (1927)	Jack Conway
The Twelve Pound Look (1910)	J. M. Barrie	The Twelve Pound Look (1920)	Jack Denton
Twentieth Century (1932)	Ben Hecht; Charles MacArthur	Twentieth Century (1934)	Howard Hawks
Twigs (1971)	George Furth	Twigs (1975)	Alan Arkin; Clark Jones
Twin Beds (1914)	Salisbury Field; Margaret Mayo	Twin Beds (1942)	Tim Whelan
The Twin Sister	Ludwig Fulda	Her Sister from Paris (1925)	Sidney Franklin
Two Blocks Away (1921)	Aaron Hoffman	The Cohens and Kellys (1926)	Harry A. Pollard
Two for Tonight	J. O. Lief; Max Lief	Two for Tonight (1935)	Frank Tuttle
Two for the Seesaw (1958)	William Gibson	Two for the Seesaw (1962)	Robert Wise
Two Idiots in Hollywood	Stephen Tobolowsky	Two Idiots in Hollywood (1988)	Stephen Tobolowsky
Two Little Drummer Boys (1899)	Walter Howard	Two Little Drummer Boys (1928)	G. B. Samuelson
Two Minutes Silence (1930)	Les Haylen	Two Minutes Silence (1933)	Paulette McDonagh
The Two Mrs. Carrolls (1944)	Martin Vale	The Two Mrs. Carrolls (1947)	Peter Godfrey
Two of a Kind (1995)	Hugh Janes	Wide Blue Yonder (2010)	Robert Young
The Two Orphans (1874)	Adolphe d'Ennery; Eugène Cormon	The Two Orphans (1915)	Herbert Brenon
The Two Orphans (1874)	Adolphe d'Ennery; Eugène Cormon	Orphans of the Storm (1921)	D. W. Griffith
The Two Orphans (1874)	Adolphe d'Ennery; Eugène Cormon	The Two Orphans (1933)	Maurice Tourneur
The Two Orphans (1874)	Adolphe d'Ennery; Eugène Cormon	The Two Orphans (1942)	Carmine Gallone
The Two Orphans (1874)	Adolphe d'Ennery; Eugène Cormon	The Two Orphans (1944)	José Benavides
The Two Orphans (1874)	Adolphe d'Ennery; Eugène Cormon	The Two Orphans (1947)	Mario Mattoli
The Two Orphans (1874)	Adolphe d'Ennery; Eugène Cormon	The Two Orphans (1949)	Hassan Al Imam
The Two Orphans (1874)	Adolphe d'Ennery; Eugène Cormon	The Two Orphans (1950)	Roberto Rodríguez
The Two Orphans (1874)	Adolphe d'Ennery; Eugène Cormon	The Two Orphans (1976)	Leopoldo Savona
The Two Sergeants (1823)	Théodore Baudouin d'Aubigny	The Two Sergeants (1913)	Eugenio Perego
The Two Sergeants (1823)	Théodore Baudouin d'Aubigny	The Two Sergeants (1922)	Guido Brignone
The Two Sergeants (1823)	Théodore Baudouin d'Aubigny	The Two Sergeants (1936)	Enrico Guazzoni
The Two Sergeants (1823)	Théodore Baudouin d'Aubigny	The Two Sergeants (1951)	Carlo Alberto Chiesa
Two Small Bodies (1977)	Neal Bell	Two Small Bodies (1993)	Beth B
Two Worlds	John Golden; Hubert Osborne	Strange Experiment (1937)	Albert Parker
Tyrannens fald (1919)	Svend Rindom	Master of the House (1925)	Carl Theodor Dreyer
Tyrannens fald (1919)	Svend Rindom	Tyrannens fald (1942)	Jon Iversen; Alice O'Fredericks

=== U ===
Play	Playwright	Film	Film director
U agoniji	Miroslav Krleža	Agonija (1998)	Jakov Sedlar
Uma Reportagem Maldita - Querô	Plínio Marcos	Querô (2007)	Carlos Cortez
The Umbrella	William Matthew Scott	London Suite (1996, TV)	Wilhelm Thiele
Un'agenzia di matrimoni (1885)	Eduardo Scarpetta	Matrimonial Agency (1953)	Giorgio Pastina
Un bon petit diable (1912)	Rosemonde Gérard; Maurice Rostand	A Good Little Devil (1914)	Edwin S. Porter
Uncertain Joy	Charlotte Hastings	The Scamp (1957)	Wolf Rilla
The Unchastened Woman (1915)	Louis K. Anspacher	The Unchastened Woman (1925)	James Young
Uncle Harry	Thomas Job	The Strange Affair of Uncle Harry (1945)	Robert Siodmak
Uncle Tom's Cabin (1852)	George Aiken	Uncle Tom's Cabin (1914)	Harriet Beecher Stowe
Uncle Vanya (1899)	Anton Chekhov	Uncle Vanya (1957 film)	Franchot Tone; John Goetz
Uncle Vanya (1899)	Anton Chekhov	Uncle Vanya (1963 film)	Laurence Olivier; Stuart Burge
Uncle Vanya (1899)	Anton Chekhov	Uncle Vanya (1970 film)	Andrei Konchalovsky
Uncle Vanya (1899)	Anton Chekhov	August (1996)	Anthony Hopkins
Uncle Vanya (1899)	Anton Chekhov	Country Life (1994)	Michael Blakemore
Uncle Vanya (1899)	Anton Chekhov	Vanya on 42nd Street (1994)	Louis Malle
Un colpo di vento	Giovacchino Forzano	A Gust of Wind (1942)	Walter Felsenstein
Uncommon Women and Others (1977)	Wendy Wasserstein	Uncommon Women and Others (1978)	Steven Robman
Un déjeuner de soleil (1925)	André Birabeau	Breakfast at Sunrise (1927)	Malcolm St. Clair
Un déjeuner de soleil (1925)	André Birabeau	At Your Orders, Madame (1939)	Mario Mattoli
Under Capricorn	John Colton; Margaret Linden	Under Capricorn (1949)	Alfred Hitchcock
Under False Flag (1935)	Gustaf Molander		
Under Milk Wood (1954)	Dylan Thomas	Under Milk Wood (1972)	Andrew Sinclair
Under Milk Wood (1954)	Dylan Thomas	Under Milk Wood (2015)	Kevin Allen
Under Sentence	Irvin S. Cobb; Roi Cooper Megrue	Fighting Odds (1917)	Allan Dwan
''The Understander'' (1929)	Jo Swerling	Melody Lane (1929 film) (1929)	Robert F. Hill
Under the Gaslight (1867)	Augustin Daly	Under the Gaslight (1914)	Lawrence Marston
Under the Yum Yum Tree (1960)	Lawrence Roman	Under the Yum Yum Tree (1963)	David Swift
Under Two Flags (1901)	Paul M. Potter	Under Two Flags (1916)	J. Gordon Edwards
Une cause célèbre (1877)	Eugène Cormon; Adolphe d'Ennery	A Celebrated Case (1914)	George Melford
Une faible femme	Jacques Deval	A Weak Woman (1933)	Max de Vaucorbeil
Une femme dans un lit (1927)	Yves Mirande	Mon cœur balance (1932)	René Guissart
Une femme dans un lit (1927)	Yves Mirande	The Cucuroux Family (1953)	Émile Couzinet
Une femme ravie	Louis Verneuil	The Lady Is Willing (1934)	Gilbert Miller
Une heure de tranquillité	Florian Zeller	Do Not Disturb (2014)	Patrice Leconte
Une vie perdue (1933)	Jacques Deval	Journal of a Crime (1934)	William Keighley
Un fils d'Amérique	Marcel Gerbidon; Pierre Veber	A Son from America (1924)	Henri Fescourt
Un fils d'Amérique	Marcel Gerbidon; Pierre Veber	A Son from America (1932)	Carmine Gallone
The Unforgettable Year 1919	Vsevolod Vishnevsky	The Unforgettable Year 1919 (1951)	Mikheil Chiaureli
The Unguarded Hour (1935)	Bernard Merivale	The Unguarded Hour (1936)	Sam Wood
Un homme en habit	Yves Mirande; André Picard	The Man in Evening Clothes (1931)	René Guissart
Unidentified Human Remains and the True Nature of Love (1989)	Brad Fraser	Love and Human Remains (1993)	Denys Arcand
Union Depot (1929)	Joe Laurie Jr. Gene Fowler; Douglas Durkin	Union Depot (1932)	Alfred E. Green
The Unknown Purple (1918)	Roland West; Carlyle Moore	The Unknown Purple (1923)	Roland West
The Unloved Woman (1913)	Jacinto Benavente	The Passion Flower (1921)	Herbert Brenon
The Unloved Woman (1913)	Jacinto Benavente	The Unloved Woman (1940)	José López Rubio
The Unloved Woman (1913)	Jacinto Benavente	The Unloved Woman (1949)	Emilio Fernández
The Unnatural and Accidental Women (2000)	Marie Clements	Unnatural & Accidental (2006)	Carl Bessai
Unter Geschäftsaufsicht (1927)	Franz Arnold; Ernst Bach	Business Under Distress (1931)	Karel Lamač; Martin Frič
Unter Geschäftsaufsicht (1927)	Franz Arnold; Ernst Bach	Wehe, wenn er losgelassen (1932)	Martin Frič; Karel Lamač
Unter Geschäftsaufsicht (1927)	Franz Arnold; Ernst Bach	The Dangerous Game (1933)	Weyler Hildebrand
Unter Geschäftsaufsicht (1927)	Franz Arnold; Ernst Bach	Josef the Chaste	Carl Boese
Unwelcome Wife	Fred Thompson; Edward A. Paulton	Die Bräutigamswitwe (1931)	Richard Eichberg
Unwelcome Wife	Fred Thompson; Edward A. Paulton	Let's Love and Laugh (1931)	Richard Eichberg
Up in Mabel's Room (1919)	Wilson Collison; Otto Hauerbach	Up in Mabel's Room (1944)	Allan Dwan
Up Pops the Devil	Frances Goodrich; Albert Hackett	Up Pops the Devil (1931)	A. Edward Sutherland
Up Pops the Devil	Frances Goodrich; Albert Hackett	Thanks for the Memory (1938)	George Archainbaud
Urban Folk Tales	Daniel Reitz	Urbania (2000)	Don Shear

=== V ===
Play	Playwright	Film	Film director
Vienne 1913	Alain Didier-Weill	V13	Richard Ledes
The Vagabond King (1925)	Brian Hooker; William H. Post	The Vagabond King (1930)	Ludwig Berger
The Valiant (1924)	Holworthy Hall; Robert Middlemass	The Valiant (1929)	William K. Howard
A Vampire Story	Moira Buffini	Byzantium (2012)	Neil Jordan
Vanity (1925)	Ernest Denny	Vanity (1935)	Adrian Brunel
The van Paemel Family (1902)	Cyriel Buysse	The van Paemel Family (1986)	Paul Cammermans
Vassa Zheleznova (1910)	Maxim Gorky	Vassa Zheleznova (1953)	Leonid Lukov
Vassa Zheleznova (1910)	Maxim Gorky	Vassa (1983),	Gleb Panfilov
Veins and Thumbtacks (1991)	Jonathan Marc Sherman	The Jimmy Show (2001)	Frank Whaley
The Vendetta of the 47 Ronin	Mayama Seika	The 47 Ronin (1941)	Kenji Mizoguchi
Veneer (1929)	Hugh Stanislaus Stange	Young Bride (1932)	William A. Seiter
Vengeful Heart	Thái Hòa	Vengeful Heart (2014)	Victor Vu
Venus in Fur (2010)	David Ives	La Vénus à la Fourrure (2013)	Roman Polanski
Veronika (1935)	Fritz Peter Buch	Fräulein Veronika (1936)	Veit Harlan
The Very Idea (1917)	William LeBaron	The Very Idea (1929)	Richard Rosson; Frank Craven
A Very Rich Woman	Ruth Gordon	Rosie! (1967)	David Lowell Rich
Vestire gli ignudi (1922)	Luigi Pirandello	Vestire gli ignudi (1953)	Marcello Pagliero
Victor (1950)	Henri Bernstein	Victor (1951)	Claude Heymann
Victoria Regina (1934)	Laurence Housman	The Young Victoria (1963)	Alan Burke
A View from the Bridge (1955)	Arthur Miller	A View from the Bridge (1962)	Sidney Lumet
The Village Squire	Arthur Jarvis Black	The Village Squire (1935)	Reginald Denham
The Vinegar Tree (1930)	Paul Osborn	Should Ladies Behave (1933)	Harry Beaumont
Vingt Ans Madame	Félix Gandéra	Love, Madame (1952)	Gilles Grangier
The Virginian (1903)	Owen Wister; Kirke La Shelle	The Virginian (1914)	Cecil B. DeMille
The Virginian (1903)	Owen Wister; Kirke La Shelle	The Virginian (1946)	Stuart Gilmore
Virginia's Husband (1925)	Florence Kilpatrick	Virginia's Husband (1928)	Harry Hughes
Virginia's Husband (1925)	Florence Kilpatrick	Virginia's Husband (1934)	Maclean Rogers
The Visit (1956)	Friedrich Dürrenmatt	The Visit (1964)	Bernhard Wicki
Visit to a Small Planet (1957)	Gore Vidal	Visit to a Small Planet (1960)	Norman Taurog
Vita & Virginia (1992)	Eileen Atkins	Vita & Virginia (2018)	Chanya Button
Vogue la galère (1951)	Marcel Aymé	Vogue la galère (1973)	Raymond Rouleau
The Voice of the Turtle (1943)	John Van Druten	The Voice of the Turtle (1947)	Irving Rapper
The Vortex (1924)	Noël Coward	The Vortex (1928)	Adrian Brunel
Vrijdag (1968)	Hugo Claus	Vrijdag (1980)	Hugo Claus
Vsyo ostayotsya lyudyam	Samuil Alyoshin	All Remains to People (1963)	Georgy Natanson
Vučjak (1923)	Miroslav Krleža	Horvat’s Choice (1985)	Eduard Galić

=== W ===
Play	Playwright	Film	Film director
Wait Until Dark (1966)	Frederick Knott	Wait Until Dark (1967)	Terence Young
Wallflower (1944)	Reginald Denham; Mary Orr	Wallflower (1948)	Fred de Cordova
The Waltz of the Toreadors (1951)	Jean Anouilh	Waltz of the Toreadors (1962)	John Guillermin
The Wanderer (1917)	Maurice Samuel	The Wanderer (1925)	Raoul Walsh
The Wandering Jew (1921)	E. Temple Thurston	The Wandering Jew (1923)	Maurice Elvey
The Wandering Jew (1921)	E. Temple Thurston	The Wandering Jew (1933)	Maurice Elvey
The Waning Sex (1923)	Fanny Hatton; Frederic Hatton	The Waning Sex (1926)	Robert Z. Leonard
Wanted on Voyage (1949)	Evadne Price; Ken Attiwill	Not Wanted on Voyage (1957)	Maclean Rogers
The War Boys (1993)	Naomi Wallace	The War Boys (2009)	Ron Daniels
War Brides (1915)	Marion Craig Wentworth	War Brides (1916 film) (1916)	Herbert Brenon
The Ware Case (1915)	George P. Bancroft	The Ware Case (1938)	Robert Stevenson
Warn That Man! (1941)	Vernon Sylvaine	Warn That Man (1943)	Lawrence Huntington
Wasser für Canitoga (1936)	Hans Rehfisch; Otto Eis; Egon Eis	Water for Canitoga (1939)	Herbert Selpin
Watch Beverly (1930)	Cyril Campion	Watch Beverly (1932)	Arthur Maude
Watch on the Rhine (1941)	Lillian Hellman	Watch on the Rhine (1943)	Herman Shumlin
The Water Engine (1977)	David Mamet	The Water Engine (1992)	Steven Schachter
Waterloo Bridge (1930)	Robert E. Sherwood	Waterloo Bridge (1931)	James Whale
Waterloo Bridge (1930)	Robert E. Sherwood	Waterloo Bridge (1940)	Mervyn LeRoy
Waterloo Bridge (1930)	Robert E. Sherwood	Gaby (film) (1956)	Curtis Bernhardt
The Waybacks (1915)	Philip Lytton	The Waybacks (1918)	Arthur W. Sterry
Way Down East (1898)	Charlotte Blair Parker	Way Down East (1920)	D. W. Griffith
Way Down East (1898)	Charlotte Blair Parker	Way Down East (1935)	Henry King
The Weaker Sex (1929)	Édouard Bourdet	The Weaker Sex (1933	Robert Siodmak
The Weaker Sex (1929)	Édouard Bourdet	The Weaker Sex (1948)	Roy Ward Baker
The Weavers (1892)	Gerhart Hauptmann	The Weavers (1927)	Frederic Zelnik
We Can't Be as Bad as All That (1910)	Henry Arthur Jones	A Society Exile (1919)	George Fitzmaurice
The Wedding (1901)	Stanisław Wyspiański	The Wedding (1972)	Andrzej Wajda
The Wedding (1901)	Stanisław Wyspiański	The Wedding (2004)	Wojciech Smarzowski
Wedding in White (1970)	William Fruet	Wedding in White (1972)	William Fruet
Welcome Stranger (1920)	Aaron Hoffman	Welcome Stranger (1924)	James Young
We Moderns (1924)	Israel Zangwill	We Moderns (1925)	John Francis Dillon
West of Tomorrow	William Bowers	Jungle Patrol (1948)	Joseph M. Newman
We Thieves Are Honourable (1941)	Enrique Jardiel Poncela	We Thieves Are Honourable (1942)	Ignacio F. Iquino
We Thieves Are Honourable (1941)	Enrique Jardiel Poncela	We Thieves Are Honourable (1956 film)	Pedro Luis Ramirez
We Were Dancing (1936)	Noël Coward	We Were Dancing (film) (1942)	Robert Z. Leonard
The Whales of August (1980)	David Berry	The Whales of August (1987)	Lindsay Anderson
What a Life (1938)	Clifford Goldsmith	What a Life (1939)	Theodore Reed
What Every Woman Knows (1908)	J. M. Barrie	What Every Woman Knows (1917)	William C. deMille
What Every Woman Knows (1908)	J. M. Barrie	What Every Woman Knows (1921)	Fred W. Durrant
What Every Woman Knows (1908)	J. M. Barrie	What Every Woman Knows (1934)	Gregory La Cava
What Happened to Jones (1897)	George Broadhurst	What Happened to Jones (1915)	Fred Mace
What Happened to Jones (1897)	George Broadhurst	What Happened to Jones (1920)	James Cruze
What Happened to Jones (1897)	George Broadhurst	What Happened to Jones (1926)	William A. Seiter
What Money Can Buy (1923)	Ben Landeck; Arthur Shirley	What Money Can Buy (1928)	Edwin Greenwood
What Price Decency?	Arthur Gregor	What Price Decency (1933)	Arthur Gregor
What Price Glory? (1924)	Maxwell Anderson; Lawrence Stallings	What Price Glory? (1926)	Raoul Walsh
What Price Glory? (1924)	Maxwell Anderson; Lawrence Stallings	What Price Glory? (1952)	John Ford
What's a Fixer For?	H. C. Potter	Fixer Dugan (1939)	Lew Landers
What's Your Husband Doing? (1917)	George V. Hobart	What's Your Husband Doing? (1920)	Lloyd Ingraham
What Say They? (1939)	James Bridie	You're Only Young Twice (1952)	Terry Bishop
What's in a Name? (2010)	Matthieu Delaporte; Alexandre de la Patellière	What's in a Name? (2012)	Alexandre de La Patellière; Matthieu Delaporte
What's Wrong with Angry? (1993)	Patrick Wilde	Get Real (1998)	Simon Shore
The Wheel (1921)	Winchell Smith	The Wheel (1925)	Victor Schertzinger
The Wheel of Life (1922)	J. B. Fagan	The Wheel of Life (1929)	Victor Schertzinger
When Knighthood Was in Flower	Paul Kester	When Knighthood Was in Flower (1922)	Robert G. Vignola
When Knights Were Bold (1906)	Harriett Jay	When Knights Were Bold (1916, British film)	Maurice Elvey
When Knights Were Bold (1906)	Harriett Jay	When Knights Were Bold (1916, Italian film)	Oreste Visalli
When Knights Were Bold (1906)	Harriett Jay	When Knights Were Bold (1929)	Tim Whelan
When Knights Were Bold (1906)	Harriett Jay	When Knights Were Bold (1936)	Jack Raymond
When Ladies Meet (1932)	Rachel Crothers	When Ladies Meet (1933)	Harry Beaumont
When Ladies Meet (1932)	Rachel Crothers	When Ladies Meet (1941)	Robert Z. Leonard
When You Comin' Back, Red Ryder? (1973)	Mark Medoff	When You Comin' Back, Red Ryder? (film) (1979)	Milton Katselas
When's Your Birthday? (1935)	John Frederick Ballard	When's Your Birthday? (1937)	Harry Beaumont
When We Are Married (1938)	J. B. Priestley	When We Are Married (1943)	Lance Comfort
When We Were Twenty-One (1900)	Henry V. Esmond	The Truth About Youth (1930)	William A. Seiter
When Women Wee (2010)	Rachel Hirons	Powder Room (2013)	MJ Delaney
Where There's a Will (1954)	R. F. Delderfield	Where There's a Will (1955)	Vernon Sewell
While Parents Sleep (1932)	Anthony Kimmins	While Parents Sleep (1935)	Adrian Brunel
Whistling in the Dark (1932)	Ernest Truex	Whistling in the Dark (1933 film)	Elliott Nugent
Whistling in the Dark (1932)	Ernest Truex	Whistling in the Dark (1941 film)	S. Sylvan Simon
White Cargo (1923)	Leon Gordon	White Cargo (1930)	J. B. Williams
White Cargo (1923)	Leon Gordon	White Cargo (1942)	Richard Thorpe
White Collars (1923)	Edith Ellis	The Idle Rich (1929)	William C. deMille
The White Disease (1937)	Karel Čapek	Skeleton on Horseback (1937)	Hugo Haas
The White Heather (1897)	Cecil Raleigh; Henry Hamilton	The White Heather (1919)	Maurice Tourneur
The White Horse Inn (1897)	Oscar Blumenthal; Gustav Kadelburg	The White Horse Inn (1926)	Richard Oswald
The White Horse Inn (1930)	Ralph Benatzky; Robert Stolz	White Horse Inn (1948)	Benito Perojo
The White Horse Inn (1930)	Ralph Benatzky; Robert Stolz	The White Horse Inn (1952)	Willi Forst
The White Horse Inn (1930)	Ralph Benatzky; Robert Stolz	Summer in Tyrol (1964)	Erik Balling
White Lady	Ladislas Fodor; Gina Kaus	Isle of Missing Men (1942)	Richard Oswald
The White Sister (1909)	Francis Marion Crawford; Walter Hackett	The White Sister (1915)	Fred E. Wright
The White Sister (1909)	Francis Marion Crawford; Walter Hackett	The White Sister (1923)	Henry King
The White Sister (1909)	Francis Marion Crawford; Walter Hackett	The White Sister (1933)	Victor Fleming
The White Sister (1909)	Francis Marion Crawford; Walter Hackett	The White Sister (1960)	Tito Davison
Who Goes There! (1950)	John Dighton	Who Goes There! (1952)	Anthony Kimmins
Who Is Sylvia? (1950)	Terence Rattigan	The Man Who Loved Redheads (1955)	Harold French
The Whole Town's Talking (1923)	Anita Loos; John Emerson	The Whole Town's Talking (1926 film)	Edward Laemmle
Who's Afraid of the Working Class? (1998)	Andrew Bovell; Patricia Cornelius; Melissa Reeves; Christos Tsiolkas; Irine Vela	Blessed (2009)	Ana Kokkinos
Who's Afraid of Virginia Woolf? (1962)	Edward Albee	Who's Afraid of Virginia Woolf? (1966)	Mike Nichols
Whose Life Is It Anyway? (1978)	Brian Clark	Whose Life Is It Anyway? (film) (1981)	John Badham
Who Was That Lady I Saw You With? (1958)	Norman Krasna	Who Was That Lady? (1960)	George Sidney
Why Did I Get Married? (2003)	Tyler Perry	Why Did I Get Married? (2007)	Tyler Perry
Why Men Leave Home (1922)	Avery Hopwood	Why Men Leave Home (1924)	John M. Stahl
Why Smith Left Home (1899)	George Broadhurst	Why Smith Left Home (1919)	Donald Crisp
The Widow's Might (1931)	Frederick J. Jackson	Widow's Might (1935)	Cyril Gardner
Wifey (1994)	Tom Noonan	The Wife (1995 film)	Tom Noonan
The Wild Duck (1884)	Henrik Ibsen	The House of Lies (1926)	Lupu Pick
The Wild Duck (1884)	Henrik Ibsen	The Wild Duck (1984)	Henri Safran
The Wild Duck (1884)	Henrik Ibsen	The Daughter (2015)	Simon Stone
Wildfire (1908)	George V. Hobart; George Broadhurst	Wildfire (1915)	Edwin Middleton
Wildfire (1908)	George V. Hobart; George Broadhurst	Wildfire (1925)	T. Hayes Hunter
The Will (1914)	J. M. Barrie	The Will (1921)	A. V. Bramble
William Ratcliff (1822)	Heinrich Heine	William Ratcliff (film) (1922)	Heinz Hanus
William Tell (1804)	Friedrich Schiller	William Tell (1903)	Lucien Nonguet
William Tell (1804)	Friedrich Schiller	William Tell (1923)	Rudolf Dworsky; Rudolf Walther-Fein
William Tell (1804)	Friedrich Schiller	William Tell (1934)	Heinz Paul
William Tell (1804)	Friedrich Schiller	William Tell (1949)	Giorgio Pastina
Willis Frau (1917)	Otto Schwartz; Max Reimann	The Crosspatch (1935)	Henry Koster; Ernst Winar
The Willow Tree (1917)	J. H. Benrimo; Harrison Rhodes	The Willow Tree (1920)	Henry Otto
Will Success Spoil Rock Hunter? (1955)	George Axelrod	Will Success Spoil Rock Hunter? (1957)	Frank Tashlin
Windfall (1933)	R. C. Sherriff	Windfall (1935 film)	George King; Frederick Hayward
Winged Victory (1943)	Moss Hart	Winged Victory (film) (1944)	George Cukor
The Winslow Boy (1946)	Terence Rattigan	The Winslow Boy (1948)	Anthony Asquith
The Winslow Boy (1946)	Terence Rattigan	The Winslow Boy (1999)	David Mamet
Winterset (1935)	Maxwell Anderson	Winterset (film) (1936)	Alfred Santell
A Winter Visitor	Jan Hartman	One Special Night (1999)	Roger Young
The Wishing Ring (1910	Owen Davis	The Wishing Ring: An Idyll of Old England (1914)	Maurice Tourneur
Wishing Well (1946)	Eynon Evans	The Happiness of Three Women (1954)	Maurice Elvey
Wit (1995)	Margaret Edson	Wit (film) (2001, TV)	Mike Nichols
The Witching Hour (1907)	Augustus Thomas	The Witching Hour (1934)	Henry Hathaway
Within the Law (1912)	Bayard Veiller	Within the Law (1916 film)	Monte Luke
Within the Law (1912)	Bayard Veiller	Within the Law (1917 film)	William P. S. Earle
Within the Law (1912)	Bayard Veiller	Within the Law (1923 film)	Frank Lloyd
Within the Law (1912)	Bayard Veiller	Paid (1930)	Sam Wood
Within the Law (1912)	Bayard Veiller	Within the Law (1939 film)	Gustav Machatý
Without a Dowry (1878)	Alexander Ostrovsky	Without a Dowry (1937)	Yakov Protazanov
Without a Dowry (1878)	Alexander Ostrovsky	A Cruel Romance (1984)	Eldar Ryazanov
Without Love (1942)	Philip Barry	Without Love (1945)	Harold S. Bucquet
Without You I'm Nothing, With You I'm Not Much Better (1988)	Sandra Bernhard	Without You I'm Nothing (1990)	John S. Boskovich
The Witness for the Defence (1911)	A. E. W. Mason	The Witness for the Defense (1919)	George Fitzmaurice
Witness for the Prosecution (1953)	Agatha Christie	Witness for the Prosecution (1957 film)	Billy Wilder
Witness for the Prosecution (1953)	Agatha Christie	Witness for the Prosecution (Hallmark Hall of Fame) (TV)	Alan Gibson
Wolves and Sheep (1875)	Alexander Ostrovsky	Wolves and Sheep (film) (1953)	Vladimir Sukhobokov
The Woman	William C. deMille	The Telephone Girl (1927)	Herbert Brenon
data-sort-value="Woman in Room 13 !" | The Woman in Room 13 (1919)	Max Marcin; Samuel Shipman; Percival Wilde	The Woman in Room 13 (1920)	Frank Lloyd
data-sort-value="Woman in Room 13 !" | The Woman in Room 13 (1919)	Max Marcin; Samuel Shipman; Percival Wilde	The Woman in Room 13 (1932 film)	Henry King
The Woman in the Case (1905)	Clyde Fitch	The Woman in the Case (1916 American film)	Hugh Ford
The Woman in the Case (1905)	Clyde Fitch	The Woman in the Case (1916 Australian film)	George Willoughby
The Woman in the Case (1905)	Clyde Fitch	The Law and the Woman (1922)	Penrhyn Stanlaws
The Woman in the Case (1905)	Clyde Fitch	The Wiser Sex (1932)	Berthold Viertel
A Woman Lies (1934)	Ladislas Fodor	Thunder in the Night (1935)	George Archainbaud
A Woman of No Importance (1893)	Oscar Wilde	A Woman of No Importance (1921)	Denison Clift
A Woman of No Importance (1893)	Oscar Wilde	A Woman of No Importance (1936)	Hans Steinhoff
A Woman of No Importance (1893)	Oscar Wilde	A Woman of No Importance (1945)	Luis Bayón Herrera
The Woman on the Index (1918)	Lillian Trimble Bradley; George Broadhurst	The Woman on the Index (1919)	Hobart Henley
The Woman on the Jury (1923)	Bernard K. Burns	The Woman on the Jury (1924)	Harry O. Hoyt
Woman to Woman (1921)	Michael Morton	Woman to Woman (1923)	Graham Cutts
Woman to Woman (1921)	Michael Morton	Woman to Woman (1929)	Victor Saville
Woman to Woman (1921)	Michael Morton	Woman to Woman (1947)	Maclean Rogers
The Woman With Four Faces	Bayard Veiller	The Woman With Four Faces (1923)	Herbert Brenon
The Women (1936)	Clare Boothe Luce	The Women (1939)	George Cukor
The Women (1936)	Clare Boothe Luce	The Opposite Sex (1956)	David Miller
The Women (1936)	Clare Boothe Luce	The Women (2008 film)	Diane English
Women Aren't Angels (1941)	Vernon Sylvaine	Women Aren't Angels (1943)	Lawrence Huntington
Women in His Life	Edith Ellis; Edward Ellis	Affairs of a Gentleman (1934)	Edwin L. Marin
Women in Prison (1932)	Dorothy Mackaye; Carlton Miles	Ladies They Talk About (1933)	Howard Bretherton; William Keighley
Women in Prison (1932)	Dorothy Mackaye; Carlton Miles	Lady Gangster (1942)	Robert Florey
Women of Twilight (1951)	Sylvia Rayman	Women of Twilight (1952)	Gordon Parry
The Wonderful Ice Cream Suit (1972)	Ray Bradbury	The Wonderful Ice Cream Suit (1998)	Stuart Gordon
The Woodsman	Steven Fechter	The Woodsman (2004)	Nicole Kassell
Words Upon the Window Pane (1930)	W. B. Yeats	Words Upon the Window Pane (1994)	Mary McGuckian
The World and His Wife	Charles Frederic Nirdlinger	Lovers (1927)	John M. Stahl
The World, the Flesh, and the Devil (1912)	Laurence Cowen	The World, the Flesh, the Devil (1932)	George A. Cooper
The World of Suzie Wong (1958)	Paul Osborn	The World of Suzie Wong (1960)	Richard Quine
Worm's Eye View (1945)	R. F. Delderfield	Worm's Eye View (1951)	Jack Raymond
Woyzeck	Georg Büchner	Wozzeck (film) (1947)	Georg C. Klaren
Woyzeck	Georg Büchner	Woyzeck (1979 film)	Werner Herzog
Woyzeck	Georg Büchner	Woyzeck (1994 film)	János Szász
The Wrecker	Arnold Ridley; Bernard Merivale	The Wrecker (1929 film)	Géza von Bolváry
WTC View (2003)	Brian Sloan	WTC View (2005)	Brian Sloan

=== Y ===
Play	Playwright	Film	Film director
The Yankee Girl (1910)	George V. Hobart	The Yankee Girl (1915)	Jack J. Clark
Years Ago	Ruth Gordon	The Actress (1953)	George Cukor
The Years Between (1944)	Daphne du Maurier	The Years Between (1946)	Compton Bennett
Yellow Jack (1934)	Sidney Howard; Paul de Kruif	Yellow Jack (1938)	Guthrie McClintic
The Yellow Nightingale (1907)	Hermann Bahr	Romance in the Dark (1938)	H. C. Potter
The Yellow Ticket (1914)	Michael Morton	The Yellow Passport (1916)	Edwin August
The Yellow Ticket (1914)	Michael Morton	The Yellow Ticket (1918)	William Parke
The Yellow Ticket (1914)	Michael Morton	The Yellow Ticket (1931)	Raoul Walsh
Yerma (1934)	Federico García Lorca	Yerma (1984)	Imre Gyöngyössy; Barna Kabay
Yerma (1934)	Federico García Lorca	Yerma (1998)	Pilar Távora
Yes, My Darling Daughter (1937)	Mark Reed	Yes, My Darling Daughter (1939)	William Keighley
Yes or No (1917)	Arthur Goodrich	Yes or No? (1920)	Roy William Neill
Yi (2000)	Kim Tae-woong	The King and the Clown (2005)	Lee Joon-ik
You and I (1923)	Philip Barry	The Bargain (1931)	Robert Milton
You Can't Fool Antoinette (1927)	Maurice Hennequin and Pierre Veber	You Can't Fool Antoinette (1936)	Paul Madeux
You Can't Take It with You (1936)	George S. Kaufman; Moss Hart	You Can't Take It with You (1938)	Frank Capra
Young America (1915)	John Frederick Ballard	Young America (1932)	Frank Borzage
The Youngest of Three	H. F. Maltby	Over the Garden Wall (1934)	Jean Daumery
The Young Lady in Pink (1921)	Gertrude E. Jennings	The Girl Who Forgot (1940)	Adrian Brunel
Young Medardus (1910)	Arthur Schnitzler	Young Medardus (1923)	Michael Curtiz
Young Mrs. Winthrop (1882)	Bronson Howard	Young Mrs. Winthrop (1915)	
Young Mrs. Winthrop (1882)	Bronson Howard	Young Mrs. Winthrop (1920)	Walter Edwards
Young Romance	William C. deMille	Young Romance (1915)	George Melford
Young Woodley (1925)	John Van Druten	Young Woodley (1928)	Thomas Bentley
Young Woodley (1925)	John Van Druten	Young Woodley (1930)	Thomas Bentley
Youth at the Helm (1934)	Ladislas Fodor; László Lakatos; Written using the pseudonym Paul Vulpius	Jack of All Trades (1936)	Robert Stevenson; Jack Hulbert

=== Z ===
Play	Playwright	Film	Film director
Zaza (1898)	Pierre Berton; Charles Simon	Zaza (1913)	Adrien Caillard
Zaza (1898)	Pierre Berton; Charles Simon	Zaza (1915)	Edwin S. Porter; Hugh Ford
Zaza (1898)	Pierre Berton; Charles Simon	Zaza (1923)	Allan Dwan
Zaza (1898)	Pierre Berton; Charles Simon	Zaza (1939)	George Cukor
Zaza (1898)	Pierre Berton; Charles Simon	Zaza (1944)	Renato Castellani
Zaza (1898)	Pierre Berton; Charles Simon	Zaza (1956)	René Gaveau
Zehn Gesichter Gegen Eins	Owen Elford (pseudonym of Otto Furth)	All in a Night's Work (1961)	Joseph Anthony
Zoot Suit (1979)	Luis Valdez	Zoot Suit (1981)	Luis Valdez

== See also ==
- List of plays adapted into feature films: A to I
- List of plays adapted into feature films: J to Q
- Film adaptation
- Lists of film source material
- List of musicals adapted into feature films
- Category:Films based on works by William Shakespeare
- List of William Shakespeare screen adaptations
