= Austral-American Productions =

Australian film production company

Austral-American Productions was a short-lived film production company in Australia during the 1940s. They made two feature films during World War II, a time of low output for Australian cinema. They also produced some stage plays and exhibited films. Hartney Arthur was managing director.

Gordon Wharton was a key financier.

The company contributed to prizes for writing. It was involved in several lawsuits.

The company was wound up in 1950.

== Credits ==
- Beautiful Canberra – short film
- A Yank in Australia (1942) – film
- Twelfth Night and The Tempest by William Shakespeare (1943) – plays produced by John Alden
- Red Sky at Morning (1944) – film

== Unmade projects ==
- Second Moses based on play by George Landen Dann Caroline Chisolm – film version
- Eureka Stockade – film version
- Daybreak – film version
- The First Joanna – stage presentation
