= Tommy Atkins (1928 film) =

1928 film by Norman Walker

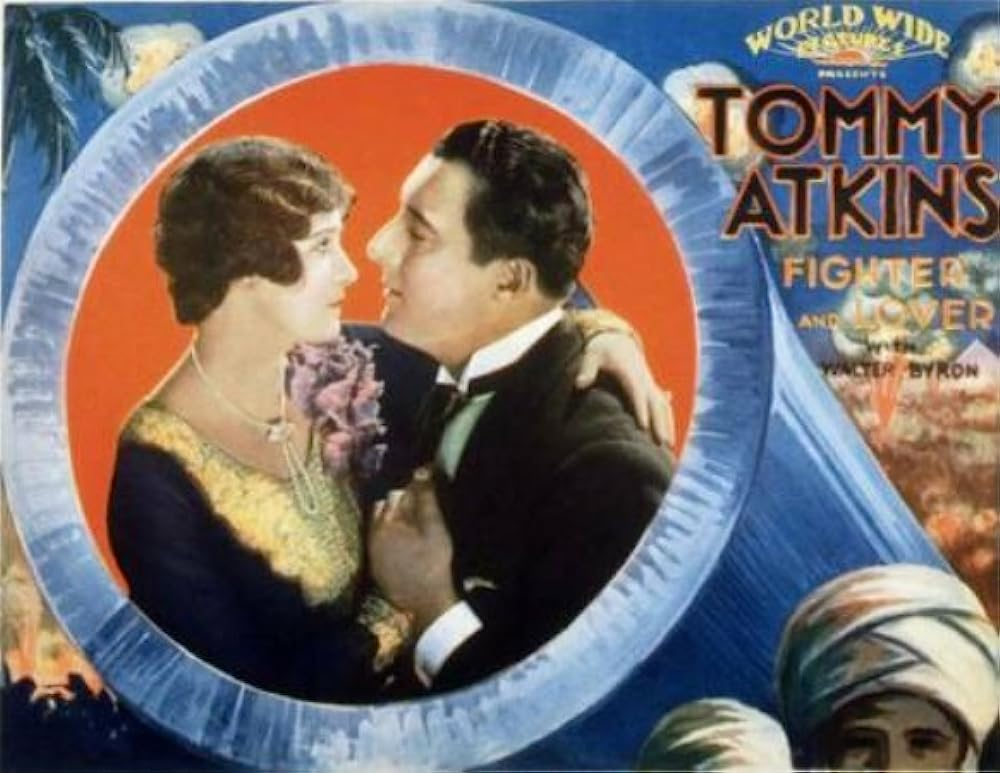
- Directed by: Norman Walker
- Written by: Arthur Shirley (play); Ben Landeck (play); Eliot Stannard; Ian Hay
- Starring: Lillian Hall-Davis; Henry Victor; Walter Byron; Shayle Gardner
- Cinematography: Claude Friese-Greene; René Guissart
- Edited by: Sam Simmonds
- Production company: British International Pictures
- Distributed by: Wardour Films
- Release date: June 1928
- Running time: 80 minutes
- Country: United Kingdom
- Language: English

Tommy Atkins is a 1928 British silent drama film directed by Norman Walker and starring Lillian Hall-Davis, Henry Victor and Walter Byron. Based on the eponymous play by Arthur Shirley and Ben Landeck, it features a romantic drama against the backdrop of the British intervention in The Sudan in the 1880s.

== Plot ==
A cleric enlists on learning he loves his brother's sweetheart, saves his life, and finds he is really an Earl.

== Cast ==
- Lillian Hall-Davis as Ruth
- Henry Victor as Victor
- Walter Byron as Harold
- Shayle Gardner as Mason
- Jerrold Robertshaw as Earl
- Pat Courtney as Ruth as a Child
- Leslie Tomlinson as Victor as a Child
- Alfred Leonard as Harold as a Child
