= Play (theatre) =

Dramatic literary form

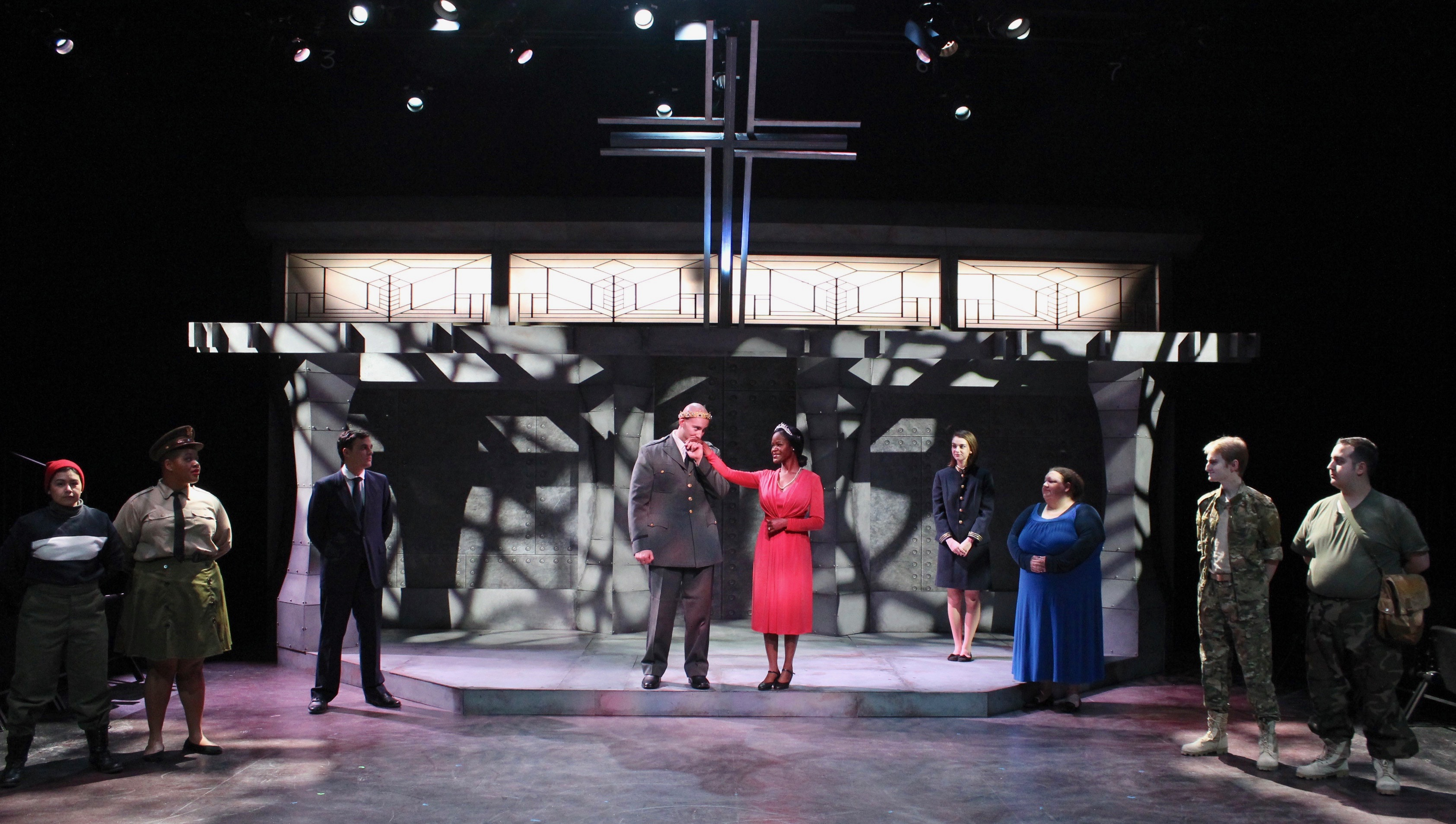
A performance of Macbeth (2018)

A play is any instance of theatre primarily characterized by scripted speech: namely, dialogue between characters, monologues, or both, used to tell a story. In other words, performers of a play read or memorize their speaking lines from a text, called a script. The script can also be called a play, and its words are intended less to be independently read and more to be performed aloud by actors in front of an audience. The writer and author of any play is known as a playwright.

Plays are staged at various levels, ranging from London's West End and New York City's Broadway – the highest echelons of commercial theatre in the Western world – to regional theatre, community theatre, and academic productions at universities and schools.

A stage play is specifically crafted for performance on stage, distinct from works meant for broadcast or cinematic adaptation. It is presented before a live audience. Some dramatists, notably George Bernard Shaw, have shown little preference for whether their plays are performed or read. The term "play" encompasses both the written texts of playwrights and their complete theatrical renditions.

== Comedy ==
Comedies are plays designed to elicit humor and often feature witty dialogue, eccentric characters, and unusual situations. Comedies cater to diverse age groups. Comedies were one of the original two genres of Ancient Greek drama, the other being tragedies. Examples of comedies include William Shakespeare's A Midsummer Night's Dream, and in the modern day, The Book of Mormon.

=== Farce ===
Farces constitute a nonsensical subgenre of comedy that frequently involve humour. They often rely on exaggerated situations and slapstick comedy. An example of a farce is William Shakespeare's play The Comedy of Errors, or Mark Twain's work Is He Dead?.

=== Satire ===
Satirical plays provide a comic perspective on contemporary events while also making political or social commentary, often highlighting issues such as corruption. Examples of satirical plays are Nikolai Gogol's The Government Inspector and Aristophanes' Lysistrata. Satire plays are a distinct and popular form of comedy, often considered a separate genre in themselves.

=== Restoration comedy ===
Restoration comedy is a genre that explores relationships between men and women, often delving into risqué themes for its time. The characters in restoration comedies frequently embody various stereotypes, contributing to the genre's consistent themes. This similarity also led to a homogeneity of message and content across most plays in this genre. Despite this, restoration comedy's exploration of unspoken aspects of relationships fostered a more intimate connection between the audience and the performance.

Restoration comedy's origins are rooted in Molière's theories of comedy, although they differ in tone and intention. The misalignment between the genre's morals and the prevailing ethics of its era is a point of interest when studying restoration comedy. This dissonance might explain why, despite its initial success, restoration comedy did not endure through the 17th century. Nonetheless, contemporary theatre theorists have been increasingly intrigued by restoration comedy as they explore performance styles with unique conventions.

== Tragedy ==
Tragedies delve into darker themes such as death and disaster. The central character, or protagonist, often possesses a tragic flaw that leads to their downfall. Tragic plays encompass a wide range of emotions and emphasize intense conflicts. Tragedy was the other original genre of Ancient Greek drama alongside comedy. Examples of tragedies include William Shakespeare's Hamlet, and John Webster's play The Duchess of Malfi.

== Historical ==
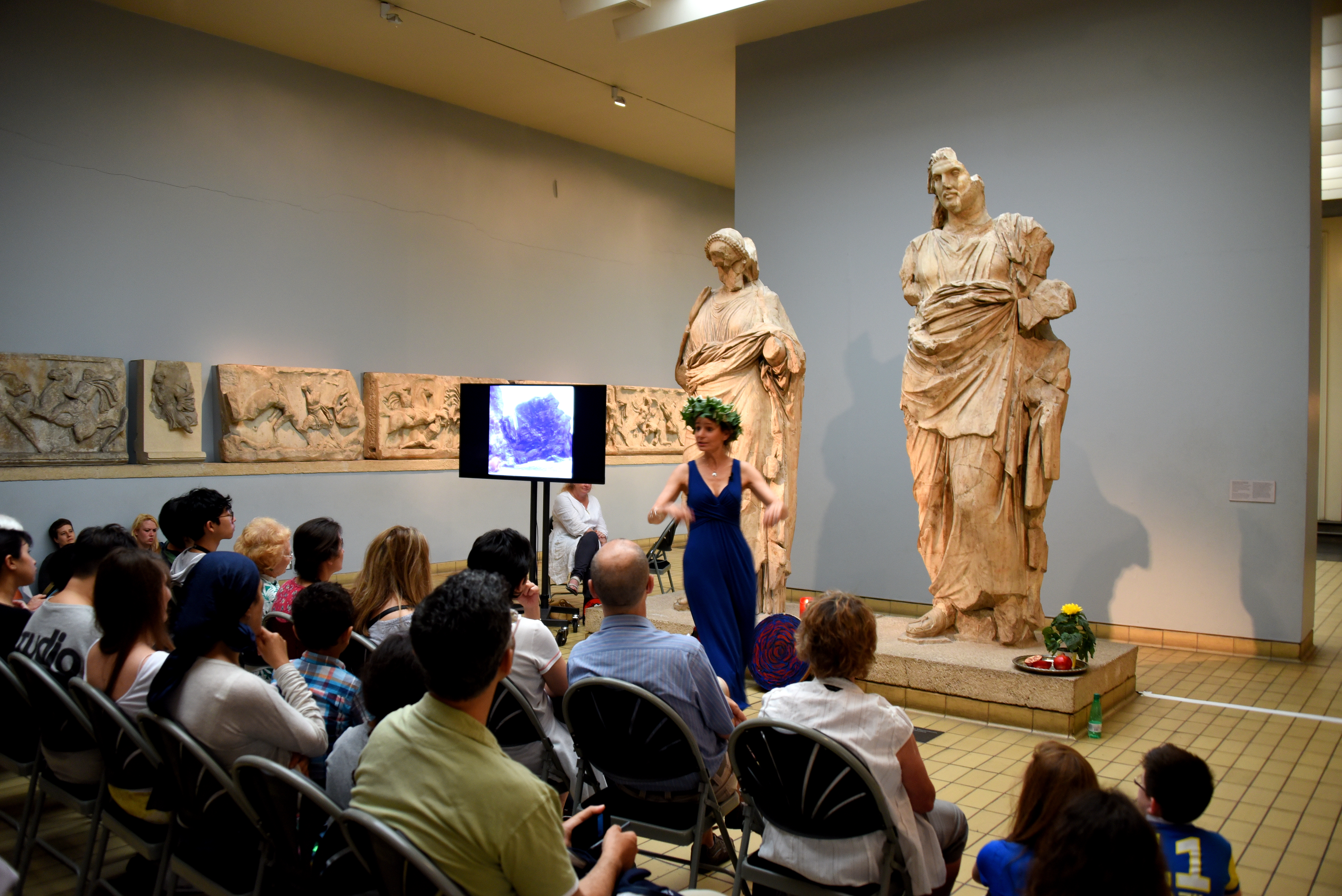
An actress performs a play in front of 2 statues from the Mausoleum at Halicarnassus. Room 21, the British Museum, London

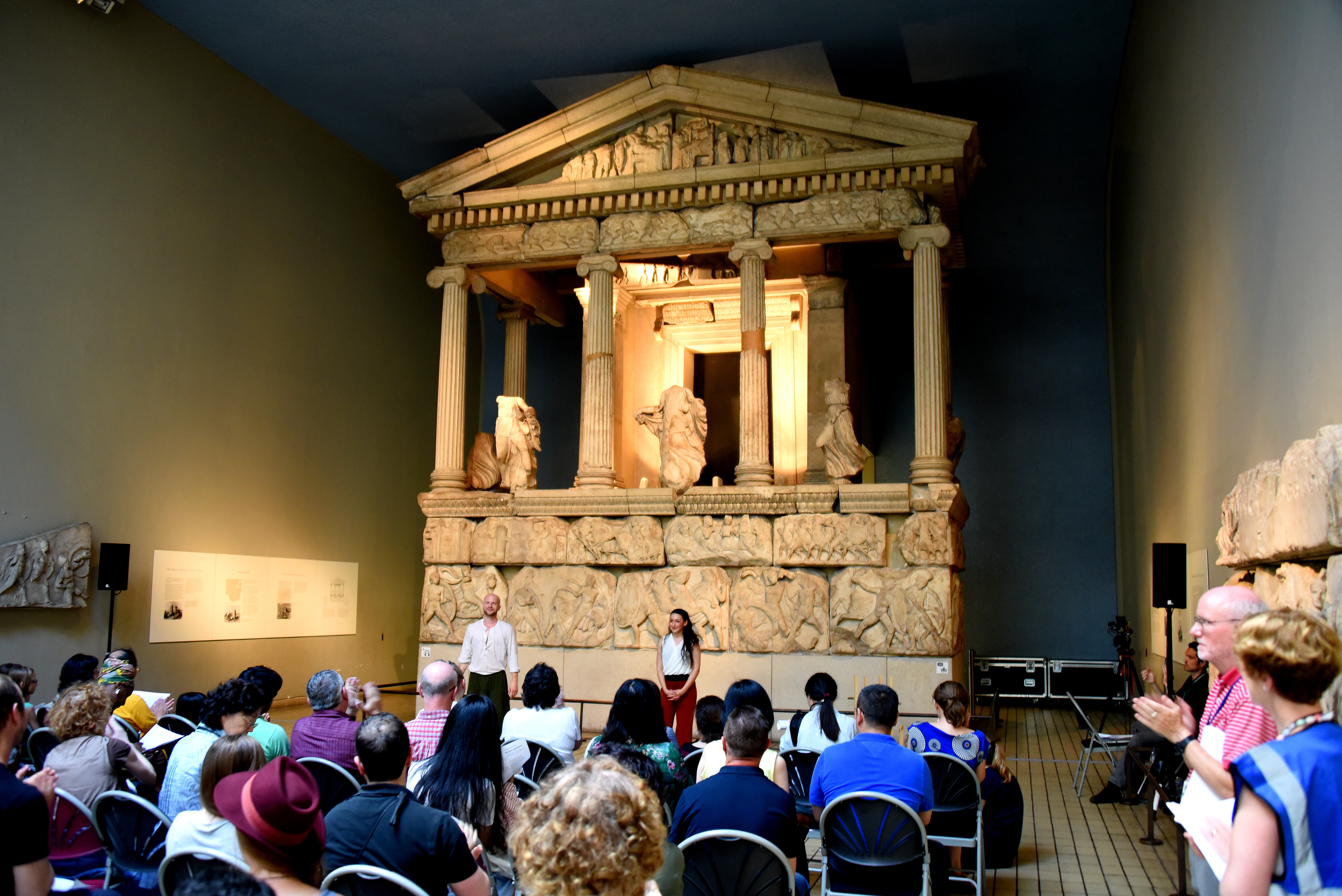
An actor and actress performing a play in front of the Nereid Monument, Room 17, the British Museum, London

Historical plays center on real historical events. They can be tragedies or comedies, though often they defy these classifications. History emerged as a distinct genre largely due to the influence of William Shakespeare. Examples of historical plays include Friedrich Schiller's Demetrius and Shakespeare's King John.

== Musical theatre ==
Dramatic entertainments incorporating music have existed since ancient times. Chinese opera developed during the medieval period, while European opera emerged during the Renaissance. Among the early genres of European musical theatre, Ballad opera was a genre of popular theatrical and musical entertainment of the 18th century in Britain that spread to the American colonies and led to Victorian burlesque, operetta, and other popular musical theatre genres. The first indigenous American musical premiered in Philadelphia in 1767, titled "The Disappointment".

Modern Western musical theatre developed further during the Victorian era, with key structural elements established by the works of Gilbert and Sullivan in Britain and Harrigan and Hart in America. By the 1920s, musical theatre styles began to crystallize, especially in America, with Rodgers and Hart leading to Rodgers and Hammerstein and the Golden Age of musicals by the 1940s. These featured songs, books (scripts) and dancing that balanced comedy, drama and pathos and were all integrated into the storytelling. From the 1960s, the songs in musicals sometimes replaced the classic musical standards with rock and pop musical styles, and by the 1980s, British "megamusicals" led by those of Andrew Lloyd Webber became perennial market leaders. Meanwhile, musical theatre became increasingly popular in Europe and around the world.

Entering the 1990s, the number of original musicals dwindled, with many productions adapting movies or novels or writing a plot around pop catalogues. Examples of the most successful musicals through the decades include Show Boat (1927), Oklahoma! (1943), My Fair Lady (1956), Hair (1967), A Chorus Line (1975), Les Misérables (1985), The Phantom of the Opera (1986), Wicked (2003) and Hamilton (2015).

== Theatre of Cruelty ==
This theatrical style originated in the 1940s when Antonin Artaud hypothesized about the effects of expressing through the body rather than "by socially conditioned thought". In 1946, he wrote a preface to his works in which he explained how he came to write as he did.

Foremost, Artaud lacked trust in language as an effective means of communication. Plays within the theatre of cruelty genre exhibit abstract conventions and content. Artaud intended his plays to have an impact and achieve a purpose. His aim was to symbolize the subconscious through bodily performances, as he believed language fell short. Artaud considered his plays enactments rather than re-enactments, indicating that he believed his actors were embodying reality, rather than reproducing it.

His plays addressed weighty subjects such as patients in psychiatric wards and Nazi Germany. Through these performances, he aimed to "make the causes of suffering audible". Audiences who were taken aback by what they saw initially responded negatively. Much of his work was even banned in France during that time.

Artaud dismissed the notion that conventional theatre of his era could provide audiences with a cathartic experience that would aid the healing process after World War II. For this reason, he gravitated towards radio-based theatre, where the audience could personally connect the words they heard with their own bodies. This approach made his work more intimate and individualized, which he believed would enhance its effectiveness in conveying the experience of suffering.

== Theatre of the absurd ==
This genre typically presents metaphysical portrayals of existential questions and dilemmas. Theatre of the absurd rejects rationality, embracing the inevitability of plunging into the depths of the human condition. Rather than explicitly discussing these issues, theatre of the absurd embodies them. This leaves the audience to engage in personal discussion and contemplation of the play's content.

A central aspect of theatre of the absurd is the deliberate contradiction between language and action. Often, the dialogue between characters starkly contrasts with their actions.

Prominent playwrights within this genre include Samuel Beckett, Jean-Paul Sartre, Eugène Ionesco, Arthur Adamov, and Jean Genet.

== Terminology ==
The term "play" can encompass either a general concept or specifically denote a non-musical play. In contrast to a "musical", which incorporates music, dance, and songs sung by characters, the term "straight play" can be used. For a brief play, the term "playlet" is occasionally employed.

The term "script" pertains to the written text of a play. After the front matter, which includes the title and author, it usually begins with a dramatis personae: a list introducing the main characters of the play by name, accompanied by brief character descriptions (e.g., "Stephano, a drunken Butler").

In the context of a musical play (opera, light opera, or musical), the term "libretto" is commonly used instead of "script".

A play is typically divided into acts, akin to chapters in a novel. A concise play may consist of only a single act, known as a "one-acter". Acts are further divided into scenes. Acts and scenes are numbered, with scene numbering resetting to 1 at the start of each subsequent act (e.g., Act 4, Scene 3 might be followed by Act 5, Scene 1). Each scene takes place in a specified location, indicated at the scene's outset in the script (e.g., "Scene 1. Before the cell of Prospero.") Changing locations usually requires adjusting the scenery, which takes time – even if it's just a painted backdrop – and can generally only occur between scenes.

Aside from the text spoken by actors, a script includes "stage directions" (distinct from the term's use in blocking, which involves arranging actors on stage). Common stage directions include the entrances and exits of actors, e.g., "[Exeunt Caliban, Stephano, and Trinculo.]" (Exeunt is the Latin plural of exit, meaning "[they] leave"). Additional stage directions may dictate how lines should be delivered, such as "[Aside]" or "[Sings]", or specify sounds to be produced off-stage, like "[Thunder]".

== See also ==
- Canovaccio
- Closet drama
- Dramatis personæ
- Staged reading
- History of theatre
- Screenplay
- L'Équarrissage pour tous

=== Lists ===
- List of basic theatre topics
- List of American plays
- List of Canadian plays
- List of Romanian plays
- List of films based on stage plays or musicals
- List of plays made into feature films
