= Red Sky at Morning (1944 film) =

- Directed by: Hartney Arthur
- Written by: Hartney Arthur
- Based on: a play by Dymphna Cusack
- Starring: Peter Finch; John Alden
- Cinematography: Rupert Kathner; Bob Gould
- Edited by: Alex Ezard; Ross Wood
- Production company: Austral-American Productions
- Distributed by: Carlyle Pictures (UK); Ray Rushmer (1948 Australia)
- Release dates: 1948 (UK); 1950 (Australia)
- Running time: 4,500 feet 48 min. (UK version); 55 min. (1950 Australian version)
- Country: Australia
- Language: English
- Budget: £10,000 or £8,000

Red Sky at Morning is a 1944 Australian melodrama set during the 19th century based on a play by Dymphna Cusack. It features an early screen performance by Peter Finch, who plays a convict who falls in love with the wife of a sea captain.

It was also known as Escape at Dawn.

== Synopsis ==
In 1812 Australia, Alicia Farley flees from her sadistic husband, Captain Farley. During a storm, she takes refuge in an inn in Parramatta and forms a relationship with Irish rebel Michael. Captain Farley tracks her down but she manages to escape with Michael and they both leave the country.

== Cast ==
- Peter Finch as Michael
- Jean McAllister as Alicia
- John Alden as Captain Farley
- Dorothea Dunstan as Emma
- Desmond Rolfe as Innkeeper
- Dorothy Whiteley as Innkeeper's Wife

== Development ==
The film was based on the play of the same name by Dymphna Cusack which had been given amateur performances on stage but had been produced several times professionally on radio, as well as published in 1942. Film rights were bought by a new company Austral-American Productions who had just made A Yank in Australia. The general manager was Hartney Arthur who announced in early 1943 the company planned to make six films, starting with Red Sky at Morning.

Arthur was Tasmanian, and his parents had owned an inn in Hobart. He said he did not alter the original play much. "The six characters of the play remain. The story is practically unaltered. The ending, the last few minutes action, has been slightly changed."

Arthur elaborated that “Austral-Americans think this film, dealing as it does with the early Australian background, will give the American people an understanding of this country. He added, "My company is providing a splendid chance for Australian writers and artists. With co-operation from the Press and other sources of publicity, Red Sky should be successful. It's a powerful story. And we’ve some competent actors interpreting it."

A prospectus to raise finance for the film said it would cost at the most £6,000 and was likely to return £25,000 "in Australia alone".

The cast included two of Australia's leading actors at the time, Peter Finch and John Alden. Finch took leave from the army to appear in the film. During filming Finch announced his engagement to Tamara Tchanova who became his first wife.

Dorothy Dunstan was eighteen years old.

== Production ==
Filming started 18 January 1943. The film was mostly shot at Fanfare Studios, Rupert Kathner's small studio in North Sydney during February 1943, with some exteriors in Windsor and Mulgoa.

In July 1943 the cast of the film performed their roles in a radio version of the play.

The company intended to follow Red Sky at Morning with another film, Eureka Stockade, but this was never made.

== Release ==
In 1944 the film was rejected for registration under the quality clause of the New South Wales Film Quota Act and it only received sporadic distribution.

The film was submitted for censorship in 1945.

By December 1945 it was reported that the film was complete but that it had cost £10,000 not the planned £6,000. The £4,000 difference was provided by Wharton and Arthur. Smith's Weekly reported that Wharton said the film "is ha'ving certain minor alterations and is expected to be ready for a private screening of syndicate members any day." This did not happen and there were complains about the syndicate.

=== UK release ===
In 1948 a 48-minute version of the film was screened in England by the distributor Carlyle Pictures, and received bad reviews. Kinematograph Weekly called the movie:

Heavy and vague in plot, badly acted, crudely dialogued and staged with touching economy, it fails utterly to justify its lengthy journey from 'Down Under.' And that's putting it mildly... Peter Finch, Jean McAllister, and John Alden... all exaggerate. The supporting players are, if possible, even worse... The time of the play is 1812, and the locale is Australian, but little else is clear. Incredibly old-fashioned and in articulate, it gets many unintentional laughs and might easily be mistaken for burlesque and parody.

The Monthly Film Bulletin called it:

A thoroughly boring film which has absolutely nothing to justify its production. The story is weak, the settings are extremely monotonous, being almost entirely restricted to the interior of a house, and all the sound effects come from "off stage". In fact, this might well have been a photographed play, amateurishly produced. The cast are stiff and do little to bring to life the characters they play. Any semblance of good dialogue there might have been is lost by the extremely poor recording, and the quality of the photography is appalling.

=== Re-release ===
Gordon Wharton of Austral-American arranged for Ray Rushmer to distribute the film. Rushmer arranged for several changes to be made by Sydney filmmaker James Pearson, including a new opening and ending. The film was retitled Escape at Dawn and ran for 55 minutes. It appears to have been released in 1950.

It was re-released in England under that title, emphasising the presence of Peter Finch in the cast. Reviews were, again, poor.

== Preservation status ==
Red Sky at Morning is now considered a lost film.

== See also ==
- List of lost films
