= A Yank in Australia =

- Directed by: Alfred J. Goulding
- Written by: Alfred J. Goulding
- Starring: Al Thomas; Hartney Arthur
- Cinematography: George Malcolm
- Production company: Austral-American Productions
- Release date: 11 November 1944
- Running time: 65 mins
- Country: Australia
- Language: English
- Budget: £4500

A Yank in Australia is a 1942 Australian comedy film directed by Alfred J. Goulding and starring Al Thomas and Hartney Arthur.

== Plot ==
Two journalists in New York, American Headlines Haggerty and Englishman Clarence Worthington are sent to cover the war in the South Pacific. They get marooned on the Australian coast along with two rival female reporters after a Japanese submarine sinks their boat. They are rescued by a girl who lives on the island with her father, Horace. Together they uncover and stop a plot by the Japanese to invade Australia.

== Cast ==
- Al Thomas as Headlines Haggerty
- Hartney Arthur as Clarence Worthington
- Kitty Bluett as Clara Matthews
- Jane Conolly as Dolly
- Graham Wicker as Horace
- Alfred J. Goulding as a Japanese spy
- Joy Nichols
- Frank Bradley
- Marie La Varre

== Production ==
The film was made by Austral-American Productions. The chief backer of this was Sydney stockbroker Gordon Wharton, who formed a syndicate and raised £3,000 to make the film. This amount proved insufficient and Wharton claimed he provided the remaining £1,500 needed himself. (A similar shortfall happened on his next film, Red Sky at Morning).

Australian born Alf Goulding had built a significant career as a director in Hollywood, but had returned to Australia due to US visa regulations. He had directed several documentaries with the title Australia Marches On and was linked with several proposed film projects.

Filming started by May 1942. The film was shot at the Commonwealth Film Laboratory studios in Sydney, with exteriors at Taronga Park Zoo. Several of the cast were established radio performers.

== Release ==
When the film was released, Wharton estimated it would make at least £40,000 in the USA. This did not happen. However the company went on to make another feature, Red Sky at Morning.

The film took two years to be released, making its world debut in Brisbane on 11 November 1944.

The Courier Mail called it "an example of just how bad a motion picture can be... In every department – production, dialogue, story – A Yank in Australia falls short. Incoherence, incredibility, and inconsistency are spread like treacle over the whole thing."

The Sunday Mail reported that the film was a "nose dive to a new low level in Australian production futility. It would be a shame to mention anyone or anything connected with the film except in terms of anathema... and this is gracious comment."

Box office receipts were poor but the film was also released in England and the US.
