= Red Sky at Morning (play) =

1935 play by Dymphna Cusack

- Written by: Dymphna Cusack
- Characters: Alicia; Michael; Landlord; Landlady; Emma; An Officer in the 83rd Regiment
- Original language: English
- Subject: convict era
- Genre: melodrama
- Setting: Sydney

Premiere
- Date premiered: September 1935
- Place premiered: Sydney Player's Club

Red Sky at Morning is a 1935 Australian stage play by Dymphna Cusack. The play helped launch Cusack's writing career and was filmed in 1943.

== Synopsis ==
In 1812 New South Wales, a woman, Alicia, is unhappily married to a brutal officer. She falls in love with an Irish convict, Michael and they decide to flee together.

== Production history ==
The play was first performed at Sydney Player's Club in September 1935 and adapted for radio in 1938. It was later revived in 1939.

The play was presented in May 1939 as part of Australian Drama Month at the Independent Theatre. The Sydney Morning Herald said it was "very well presented" although felt it would have been more effective as a one act play.

== Critical reception ==
Noted critic Leslie Rees wrote of the play that:

An undertone of passionate resentment against injustice and coercion is heard, but there is also a mannered wit and an acute realisation of character, a clear-cut picture of the times. It is a play of style. Against these considerable merits must be men tioned a sparseness of action, especially the failure to satisfy expectations in the second act. However, the texture of the speech in this play is so fine, the quality of compassion so moving, that such a fault does not, to my mind at any rate, become paramount. To play a curtain-raiser in the same programme would help conceal the deficiency.

One critic said "it is considered by many competent judges to be the best Australian play to date."

The Sydney Morning Herald said "The last scene grips one, though it ends tamely."

== Radio adaptations ==
The play was adapted for radio in 1938 directed by John Cairns. The Wireless Weekly said "all the way through there was a suggestion of cliches. The fact that the writing was stylish and poetical does not redeem the play one little bit."

The play was performed again in 1940. Wireless Weekly called it "A well-constructed play, and the dialogue has a lambent, graceful quality. But one feels that Miss Cusack’s passion for discussion and the graceful phrase holds up the action too often. "

There was a version in 1943 where the play was performed by the members of the film adaptation of the play including Peter Finch.

Other versions of the play were produced on radio in 1952 and 1957.

== Publication ==
The play was published in 1942 by Melbourne University Press, in association with Oxford University Press.
