= Brian Sloan =

American entrepreneur

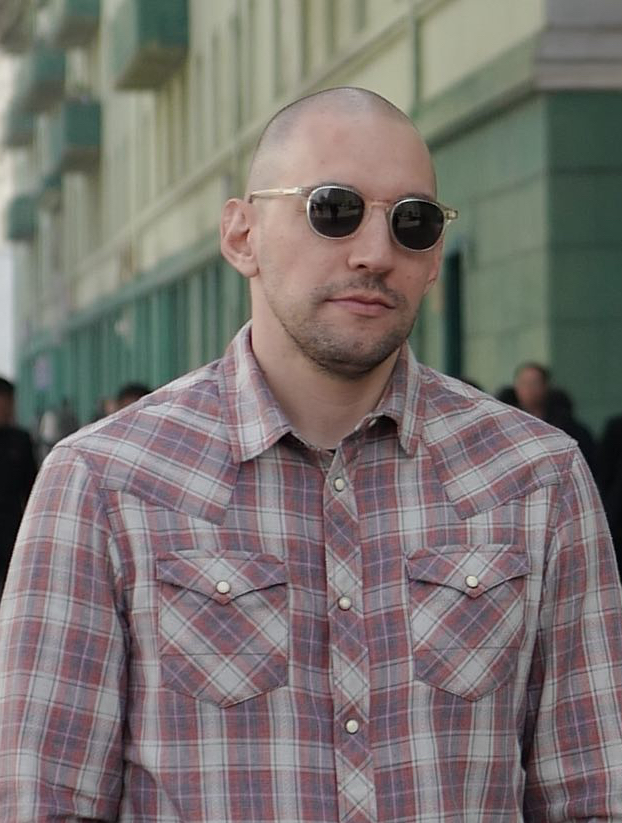
- Education: Penn State Dickinson School of Law; University of Missouri
- Occupation: Entrepreneur
- Known for: Creator of sex toys & adult-themed beauty contests

Brian Sloan is an American entrepreneur known for creating a number of sex toys and adult-themed beauty contests. He is one of the few entrepreneurs in the adult industry to successfully use crowd funding for his products. He hosted a number of genital beauty contests, including a vaginal beauty contest, a scrotum beauty contest, and an anus beauty contest. He is also the inventor of the first sex toy that uses artificial intelligence to replicate human movements, and appears as a pitchman in infomercial style videos for most of his products and contests.

== Early life and education ==
Sloan grew up in Skokie, Illinois. He graduated from the University of Missouri in 2002 where he double majored in philosophy and political science. He went on to attend Penn State Dickinson School of Law where he graduated in 2005.

== Career ==
Sloan graduated from law school but never worked as a lawyer. He started his first business purchasing items from bankruptcy auctions and then reselling them online. He also made purchases from garage sales and antique shows, buying anything that he could resell for more money on eBay.

In 2006, Sloan began selling human skulls. He purchased skulls from China and then boiled, cleaned, and disassembled them before selling the skulls on eBay. In 2007, Chicago artist Jojo Baby visited Sloan's apartment to purchase vintage mannequins when he saw human skulls in boiling in a pot of water in Sloan's kitchen. Jojo Baby subsequently called the police and Sloan was questioned on suspicion of being a serial killer. Sloan was never charged with a crime, but the skulls were confiscated and the incident was profiled on the front page of the Chicago Tribune.

Sloan decided to relocate to Beijing, China in 2007. In China, Sloan began to develop and manufacture an automatic male sex toy and by 2009 was generating over $1 million in annual sales. Sloan's best selling product has been the Autoblow 2, which generated media coverage internationally. It was the first product of its type on a crowdfunding platform. Since its launch, the product has appeared on Comedy Central’s Not Safe With Nikki Glaser Season 1 Episode 4 and HBO series Silicon Valley, Season 2, episode 7. Additional products Sloan has crowdfunded include a flexible vibrator known as Slaphappy, a male masturbator known as 3Fap, and Autoblow A.I., the first sex toy that uses artificial intelligence to replicate human movements.

In June 2015, Sloan launched a worldwide vaginal beauty contest in order to find vulvas to replicate onto the top of the Autoblow 2. Three million votes were cast from 191 countries across 110 vulva photo submissions. Sloan was criticized by several female journalists about his Vaginal Beauty Contest. One publication cited the contest’s risk of adding to “pervasive judgment of women’s bodies by men”, while a feminist writer called the contest “A veritable manwich of misogynist manure". He followed up in November that year with a male genital beauty contest, focusing on the scrotum. Sloan launched a third contest for the "most beautiful anus" in October 2016. He awarded $10,000 of prize money to the 3 winners of each of the contests.

== Personal life ==
In 2014 and 2016, Sloan received media coverage for visiting North Korea and running in the Pyongyang marathon, in Pyongyang, North Korea. He was one of 300 foreigners in 2014 and one of 1,000 foreigners to compete in 2016 in the marathon. He documented his time in Pyongyang in media interviews, stating that his group was taken to 2 giant statues of Kim Jong Il and his father Kim Il Sung, where they were advised to lay flowers as a mark of respect.

Sloan was profiled in the June 2016 print edition of Playboy magazine in an article entitled “The Man Who Wants To Change The Way Men Get Off.” The article discusses Sloan's inventions, contests, entrepreneurship, and lifestyle.
