= Ben Landeck =

British playwright

Ben Landeck (1864–1928) was a prolific British playwright, who wrote melodramas often in collaboration with Arthur Shirley. Several of his plays were made into early films.

== Early life ==
Landeck was born in London on 24 October 1846.

== Career ==
Landeck wrote plays alone and in collaboration with other playwrights, in particular Arthur Shirley; their collaboration lasted from 1892 until 1923. One of his earliest successes was My Jack. Plays written with Shirley include A King of Crime, Saved from the Sea, Tommy Atkins, Jack Tar, A Lion's Heart, Women and Wine, The Women of France, and The Savage and the Woman. A number of the plays were made into movies between 1908 and 1928. In 1898 Going the Pace by Landeck and Shirley was first performed in Wolverhampton and later London. The staging featured horses, foxhounds and a hansom cab.

In 1923 the Lyceum Theatre in London produced the melodrama What Money can Buy by Landeck and Shirley. Although it was described as a "drama of modern life" the plot owed its dramatic roots to nineteenth-century melodrama which was enhanced by being performed against a background of music.

In a collaboration with Oswald Brand he wrote The Adventures of Dr Nikola which was performed in London in 1902.

== Personal life ==
In 1909 he married the actress Valerie Crespin, who died in April 1934. Landeck died in London on 6 January 1928.
