= Hartney Arthur =

Australian actor, writer and film director

- Born: Hartney J. Arthur; 29 December 1917; Hobart, Tasmania
- Died: 24 March 2004 (aged 86); Bethel, Connecticut
- Occupations: Actor, Writer Director

Hartney J. Arthur (29 December 1917 – 24 March 2004) was an Australian actor, writer and film director, who worked in stage, radio and film.

== Biography ==
He was born in Hobart Tasmania, and appeared as a convict boy in For the Term of his Natural Life (1927). He went into work in Sydney radio and theater as a writer, director and actor, and toured New Zealand in the title role of Charley's Aunt. He later directed Peter Finch in Red Sky at Morning (1944) and managed a chain of theaters in New South Wales.

In 1949 he moved to the U.S. and worked for the Australian Information Bureau and as a theater and film agent. He died in Bethel, Connecticut on 24 March 2004, aged 86.

== Select Credits ==
- For the Term of His Natural Life (1927) – film – actor
- Roundabout (1937) – play – actor
- Private Lives by Noël Coward (1939) – play – actor
- A Yank in Australia (1942) – film – actor
- Red Sky at Morning (1944) – film – writer, director
- Flicka Daze – book
- West Side Story (1960) – director of Australian production Hartney is a distant relative of Australian movie producer Phillip Avalon.
