= The Thirteenth Chair =

The Thirteenth Chair can refer to:

- The Thirteenth Chair (play), a 1916 play by Bayard Veiller
- The Thirteenth Chair (1919 film), based on the play
- The Thirteenth Chair (1929 film), based on the play
- The Thirteenth Chair (1937 film), based on the play
