= The Trial of Mary Dugan =

The Trial of Mary Dugan may refer to:

- The Trial of Mary Dugan (play), a 1927 play by Bayard Veiller
- The Trial of Mary Dugan (1929 film), an American pre-Code film, based on the play
- The Trial of Mary Dugan (1931 film), an American drama film, based on the play
- The Trial of Mary Dugan (1941 film), an American drama and thriller film, based on the play
