= Within the Law =

Within the Law may refer to:

- Within the Law (play), a play by Bayard Veiller
- Several movies based on Veiller's play:
  - Within the Law (1916 film), an Australian silent film directed by Monte Luke
  - Within the Law (1917 film), an American silent film directed by William P. S. Earle
  - Within the Law (1923 film), an American silent film directed by Frank Lloyd
  - Within the Law (1939 film), an American film directed by Gustav Machatý
