= The Murder Trial of Mary Dugan =

1931 film directed by Arthur Robison

- Directed by: Arthur Robison
- Written by: Arthur Robison
- Based on: The Trial of Mary Dugan by Bayard Veiller
- Produced by: Louis B. Mayer
- Starring: Nora Gregor; Egon von Jordan; Peter Erkelenz
- Cinematography: Henry Sharp
- Edited by: Anson Stevenson
- Production company: Metro-Goldwyn-Mayer
- Distributed by: Parufamet
- Release date: 3 February 1931
- Running time: 108 minutes
- Country: United States
- Language: German

The Murder Trial of Mary Dugan (German: Mordprozess Mary Dugan) is a 1931 mystery drama film directed by Arthur Robison and starring Nora Gregor, Egon von Jordan and Peter Erkelenz. It was shot at the Culver City studios of Metro-Goldwyn-Mayer with sets designed by the art director Cedric Gibbons. The film is a German-language remake of the 1929 film The Trial of Mary Dugan, itself based on a play of the same title. It was distributed as part of the Parufamet agreement with UFA. It premiered at the Marmorhaus in Berlin.

== Synopsis ==
After she is accused of killing her wealthy lover Broadway showgirl Mary Dugan is put on trial for murder. After she is let down by her initial lawyer, her brother Jimmy takes over her case. Despite his lack of experience he manages to uncover evidence from the theatrical world of Mary's associates to suggest she has been framed.

== Cast ==
- Nora Gregor as Mary Dugan
- Egon von Jordan as Jimmy Dugan
- Peter Erkelenz as Edward West, der Verteidiger
- Arnold Korff as Galway, der Staatsanwalt
- Hedwiga Reicher as Mrs. Gertrude Rice
- Julia Serda as Die Zofe Marie
- Paul Weigel as Präsident Nash
- Lucy Doraine as Ilona
- Margarete Knapp as Dagmar Lorne

== See also ==
- The Trial of Mary Dugan, a 1931 Spanish-language film

== Bibliography ==
- Klaus, Ulrich J. Deutsche Tonfilme: Jahrgang 1931. Klaus-Archiv, 2006.
- Waldman, Harry. Hollywood and the Foreign Touch: A Dictionary of Foreign Filmmakers and Their Films from America, 1910-1995. Scarecrow Press, 1996.
