= Within the Law (1916 film) =

- Still from the movie
- Directed by: Monte Luke assistant: W.J. Lincoln
- Written by: W. J. Lincoln
- Based on: play by Bayard Veiller
- Starring: Muriel Starr; Monte Luke
- Cinematography: Maurice Bertel
- Production company: J. C. Williamson Ltd
- Release date: 10 January 1916 (Melbourne)
- Running time: Four reels (4,000 feet – est. 60 mins
- Country: Australia
- Languages: Silent; English intertitles

Within the Law is a 1916 Australian silent film based a play of the same name by Bayard Veiller. The leading role was played by American stage star Muriel Starr, reprising her stage performance. It is considered a lost film.

== Plot ==
Shopgirl Mary Turner (Muriel Starr) is wrongly accused of theft due to her employer, powerful businessman Edward Guilder, and is sent to prison. On her release she joins forces with another woman and executes a series of scams by securing money from wealthy men with breach of promise suits. She targets Dick Guilder, her enemy's son, but finds herself falling in love with him. Dick is framed for an underworld killing but this is solved. Mary is cleared of her original crime and realises she loves Dick.

== Cast ==
- Muriel Starr as Mary Turner

== Development ==
The film is based on a popular play which was later filmed in 1917, 1923, 1930 and 1939.

Muriel Starr came to Australia in 1913 to perform in the play for J. C. Williamson Ltd, and was a great success with the local public, running for over three months in Melbourne and sixteen weeks in Sydney.

It was the fourth film shot at J. C. Williamson Studios, though the second released.

== Production ==
The film version was shot primary on the stage of the Theatre Royal in Melbourne. W.J. Lincoln worked on the script and assisted Monte Luke with direction. Filming was completed by September 1915.

Muriel Starr would shoot the film in the morning while rehearsing another play, Under Cover, in the afternoon and acting in yet another play, The Law of the Land, that night.

While most of the film was shot in the studio, there was some location shooting including at Buckley and Nunn's store in Bourke Street.

There is no published cast list for the film but a short revival of the play was held at Theatre Royal in Melbourne six weeks after the film had been shot. It is likely that most of the cast members would have repeated their stage roles on screen.

A contemporary review said "With the exception of Sidney Stirling, Theodore Boase, and Clarence Blakiston, this four reeler presents the original cast as on the stage."

=== Cast of revival ===
- Muriel Starr as Mary Turner
- Florence Heston as Agnes Lynch
- Gertrude Boswell as Helen Morris
- Sydney Stirling as Joe Garson
- Clarence Blakiston as Richard Gilder
- Lincoln Plumer as Police Inspector Burke
- Boyd Irinw as Detective Sergeant Cassidy
- George Bryant as Edward Gilder
- Harry Sweeney as The Stool Pigeon
- Dorothy Davies as Gilder's Private Secretary
- H. W. Varna as The Lawyer
- Horace Book as Gilder's Clerk

== Reception ==
According to a review in Motion Picture News, "the picture suffers in comparison with the speaking version, but nevertheless affords good entertainment. The photographer, W. J. Lincoln, has given the best effects possible. Monte Luke directed the filming of the production."

The movie was not received well at the box office although it ran for a fortnight at the Paramount Theatre, Melbourne.

Film historian Ralph Marsden later wrote that "of for four stage adaptations filmed by the JCW Studio it seems likely that Within the Law was the best". It was also released before Get Rich Quick Wallingford and Officer 666, even though those two films were filmed earlier.

Muriel Starr continued to appear in revivals of the play throughout her career.

After the film was completed, it was announced Lincoln was writing another movie for Starr directed by Luke, but this does not appear to have been made.
