= Lal Chand Mehra =

Indian actor

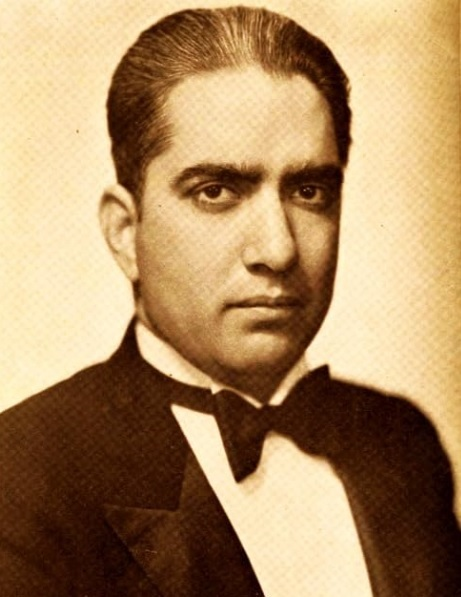
- Lal Chand Mehra in 1933
- Born: August 14, 1897; Amritsar, Punjab Province, British India (present-day Punjab, India)
- Died: October 21, 1980 (aged 83); Los Angeles, California, United States
- Education: University of Punjab; University of California Berkeley
- Occupation(s): Actor, academic
- Spouse: Georgia Williams (m. 1933)

Lal Chand Mehra was an Indian character actor and academic active in Hollywood from the 1920s through the 1960s.

== Biography ==
Mehra was born into a prominent Hindu family in Amritsar, India. He attended the University of Punjab as an undergraduate, and got his postgraduate degrees in education and philosophy at the University of California at Berkeley.

In Hollywood, he worked as an actor and also as a technical director on films that called for knowledge of Indian culture and customs. He also gave lectures on Indian culture and current events throughout Southern California and on the radio. He told reporters he planned on eventually going back to India and directing films, but it does not appear that he returned to India.

He married concert violinist Georgia Williams in 1933.

== Selected filmography ==
- Escape to Burma (1955)
- Man-Eater of Kumaon (1948)
- The Caribbean Mystery (1945)
- The White Cliffs of Dover (1944)
- Casablanca (1942)
- Bombay Clipper (1942)
- Drums of Fu Manchu (1940)
- Island of Lost Men (1939)
- Mr. Moto's Last Warning (1939)
- Storm Over Bengal (1938)
- The Thirteenth Chair (1937)
- The Leathernecks Have Landed (1936)
- The Mask of Fu Manchu (1932)
- The Thirteenth Chair (1929)
- The King of Kings (1927)
