= The Primrose Path (1915 film) =

- Still from the film
- Directed by: Theodore Marston
- Written by: Maie B. Havey
- Based on: The Primrose Path; 1907 play by Bayard Veiller
- Starring: Gladys Hanson; Hal Forde
- Production company: Universal Pictures
- Distributed by: Universal Pictures
- Release date: December 13, 1915
- Running time: 5 reels
- Country: United States
- Language: Silent (English intertitles)

The Primrose Path is a 1915 American silent drama film directed by Theodore Marston. It is based on the play of the same name by Bayard Veiller. A print of The Primrose Path exists in the BFI National Archive.

== Plot ==
Joan, a country girl, elopes with Ned Templeton, a young artist. They are married and go to Paris. For a time they are happy, then poverty overtakes them and Ned falls ill. Joan cannot make any money and he is dying because he has no food and no medicine to build up his strength. An art dealer has seen Joan and fallen in love with her. He offers her money to come to his rooms. She refuses, but finally, driven by Ned's great necessity, she goes.

Ned believes the money has come from her father. He recovers and to avoid the man, Joan persuades him to go to America. In this new land success comes to Ned through Cartwright, a millionaire, and his daughter, Helen, who has become attracted to the artist. Joan realizes that Ned is being led away from her. Cartwright buys a picture from Ned, called "The Primrose Path," for which Joan was the model. Ned is painting Helen's portrait. When it is finished Cartwright installs Ned in a fine studio.

Realizing that Joan would be out of place, he suggests that she remain in their cheap flat for a time. This almost breaks her heart, but she b-iws to his decision. As time goes on Helen and Ned are thrown more together and spend all their hours in each other's company. Ned's visits to Joan are fewer uiid fewer. F'innlly he sends her a check and a curt note telling Her he can't see her that week. She understands and returns the check saying she is his wife, not his mistress. Then she disappears.

Refusing to accept Ned's support, she poses for n livelihood. In an art school which Ned has been made director she comes face to face with her husband. He upbraids her for being a model and she turns on him. saying it is the only thing she could do. Helen arrives on the scene to take Ned away to a dance. He slips out and the women face each other. Why, you're the girl in 'The Primrose Path,' " says Helen. "Yes— and I am also Ned's wife," retorts Joan. Then, clutching the younger girl's shoulder, she forces her to listen to a story of the poverty of their Paris days when she sacrificed her body, her soul and her honor to keep Ned alive. "Oh, my father will recompense you " says Helen. Joan laughs, loud and shrill. "You're up for sale, Ned," she tells her husband who returns at that moment. She looks from one to the other and tells Helen she gives Ned to her. But her heart is broken.

Ned begins to repent; things do not please him- he feels that he wants only his wife and the old days again. Helen tries to allure him in every way, but all is useless. Cartwright, seeing his spoiled daughter unhappy, decides to buy .loan over to give Ned his legal freedom. He sends for Joan, who comes. They tell Ned she has come to accept a large sum for him. He does not believe this, and so confident are they that this is what the woman, will do that they hide Ned behind a portiere to watch the scene between his wife and Cartwright. When Joan comes the millionaire offers $100,000. She cannot understand. Then she looks at Helen and knows that they are trying to buy Ned from her. She turns on the girl, "You knew what I had done for him," she says, "and yet you thought I would accept money for him." Sadly she turns to go away alone, but Ned had heard enough. Rushing out, he takes her into his arms, pleading for forgiveness, and Joan sees that his heart is hers again.

== Cast ==
- Gladys Hanson as Joan Templeton
- Hal Forde as Ned Templeton
- E. Cooper Willis as Joan's Father
- Nina Blake as Helen
- William J. Welsh as Cartwright

== Reception ==
A contemporary review in the Fort Wayne Journal Gazette praised both Hanson and Forde's performances.
