= The Fight (1915 film) =

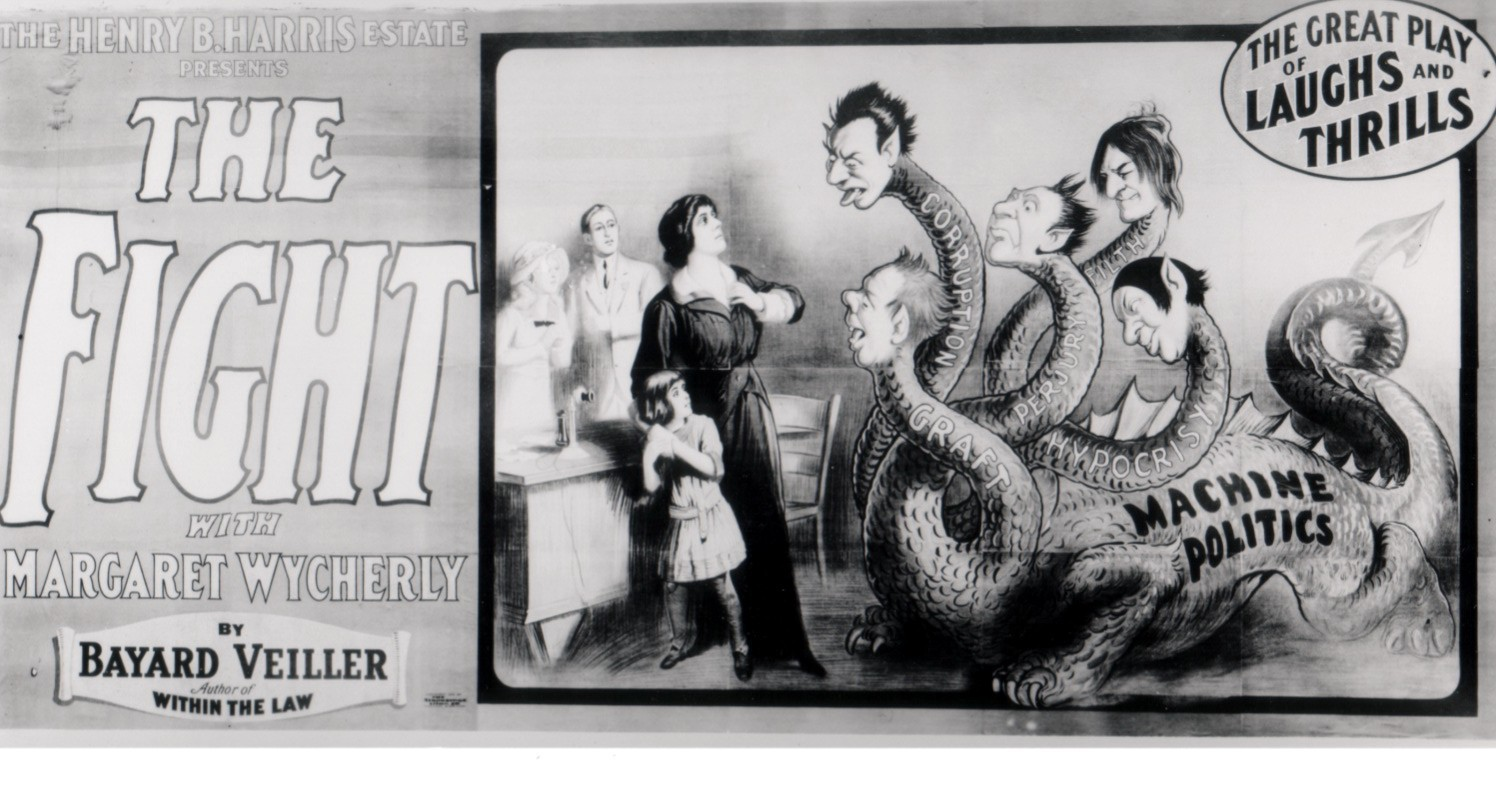
- poster to the stage play
- Directed by: George Lederer
- Written by: Herbert Hall Winslow (scenario); Bayard Veiller (story, play)
- Produced by: George W. Lederer Stage Filmotions Inc.
- Starring: Margaret Wycherly; John E. Kellard
- Distributed by: World Film Manufacturing Company
- Release date: March 15, 1915
- Running time: 6 reels
- Country: United States
- Languages: Silent; English titles

The Fight is a lost 1915 silent film social drama directed by George Lederer and starring Margaret Wycherly(her film debut). The story was by Wycherly's husband, writer Bayard Veiller and is based on his 1912 Broadway play version. The stage version was produced by The Estate of Henry B. Harris who died in the Titanic Disaster earlier in 1912.

== Cast ==
- Margaret Wycherly as Jane Thomas
- John E. Kellerd as Vance
- Katherine La Salle as May
- Tim Cronin as Callahan
- Jeanette Bageard as Pearl Haskell
- Sonia Massell as Gertie
- Edna Hibbard as Daisy Woodford
- Charles Trowbridge as Joe Keeler
- Albert Gran as Doctor Root
- W. W. Crimans as Senator Woodford
- Wilbur C. Hudson as Amos Judson
- Ernest Carr as Dan
- Charles Merriwell as Eddie Judson
- Stapleton Kent as Dick Haskell
- Thomas Riley as Gaines
- Harry Braham as Throckmorton
- Horace Weston as a waiter
- Joe Chaille as a photographer

== See also ==
- List of lost films
- Damaged Goods (1914)
