= The Trial of Mary Dugan (1931 film) =

1931 film

- Directed by: Marcel De Sano; Gregorio Martínez Sierra
- Written by: Bayard Veiller (play); Becky Gardiner; José López Rubio; Eduardo Ugarte
- Starring: José Crespo; Adrienne D'Ambricourt; Juan de Landa
- Cinematography: Gordon Avil
- Production company: Metro-Goldwyn-Mayer
- Distributed by: Metro-Goldwyn-Mayer
- Release date: June 26, 1931
- Running time: 88 minutes
- Country: United States
- Language: Spanish

The Trial of Mary Dugan (Spanish: El proceso de Mary Dugan) is a 1931 American drama film directed by Marcel De Sano and Gregorio Martínez Sierra and starring José Crespo, Adrienne D'Ambricourt and Juan de Landa.

It is based on Bayard Veiller's play The Trial of Mary Dugan. The film is a Spanish-language version of the 1929 hit The Trial of Mary Dugan. It was decided by Metro-Goldwyn-Mayer to remake the film for the Spanish market rather than subtitle or dub it as it contained long periods of static talking during the courtroom scenes. A French version and the German The Murder Trial of Mary Dugan were also made.

The film re-used the sets designed by Cedric Gibbons for the original 1929 film.

== Cast ==
- José Crespo as Jimmy Dugan
- Adrienne D'Ambricourt as Marie Ducrol
- Juan de Landa as Insp. Hunt
- María Fernanda Ladrón de Guevara as Mary Dugan
- Delia Magaña as Dagmar Lorne
- Celia Montalván as May Harris
- Francisco Moreno as Secretario
- Elvira Morla as Sra. Rice
- Manuel París as Henry Plaisted
- Ramón Pereda as Edward West
- Rafael Rivelles as Fiscal
- José Soriano Viosca as Juez
- Romualdo Tirado as James Madison
- Julio Villarreal as Dr. Welcome
- Lucio Villegas as Cpt. Price

== Bibliography ==
- Jarvinen, Lisa. The Rise of Spanish-language Filmmaking: Out from Hollywood's Shadow, 1929-1939. Rutger's University Press, 2012.
