= Margaret Wycherly =

English actress

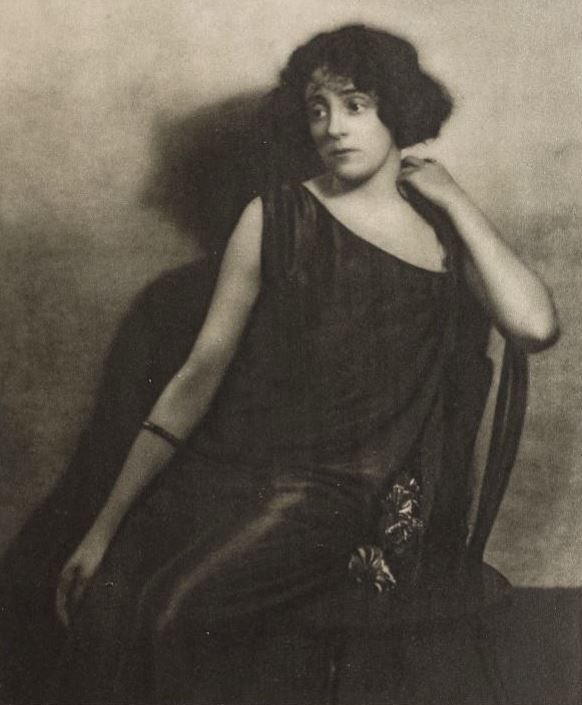
- Born: Margaret De Wolfe; 26 October 1881; London, England, U.K.
- Died: 6 June 1956 (aged 74); St. Clare's Hospital, New York City, New York, U.S.
- Resting place: St Mary Churchyard, Bepton, England
- Other name: Lovett De Wolfe
- Occupation: Actress
- Years active: 1905–1955
- Spouse: Bayard Veiller (m. 1901; div. 1922)
- Children: Anthony Veiller

Margaret De Wolfe Wycherly (26 October 1881 – 6 June 1956) was an English actress. A prolific stage and screen performer, she spent many years in the United States and is best remembered for her Broadway roles and Hollywood character parts. On screen she played mother to Gary Cooper (Sergeant York) and James Cagney (White Heat). She was nominated for the Academy Award for Best Supporting Actress for her role in Sergeant York (1941) but lost to Mary Astor for The Great Lie (1941).

== Early life ==
Margaret Wycherly was born in London, England to a Canadian father and American mother, Dr. and Mrs. J. L. De Wolfe. She was married to writer Bayard Veiller (1869–1943) in 1901. They had a son, Anthony Veiller (1903–1965), who also became a writer. She and Veiller divorced in 1922.

== Career ==
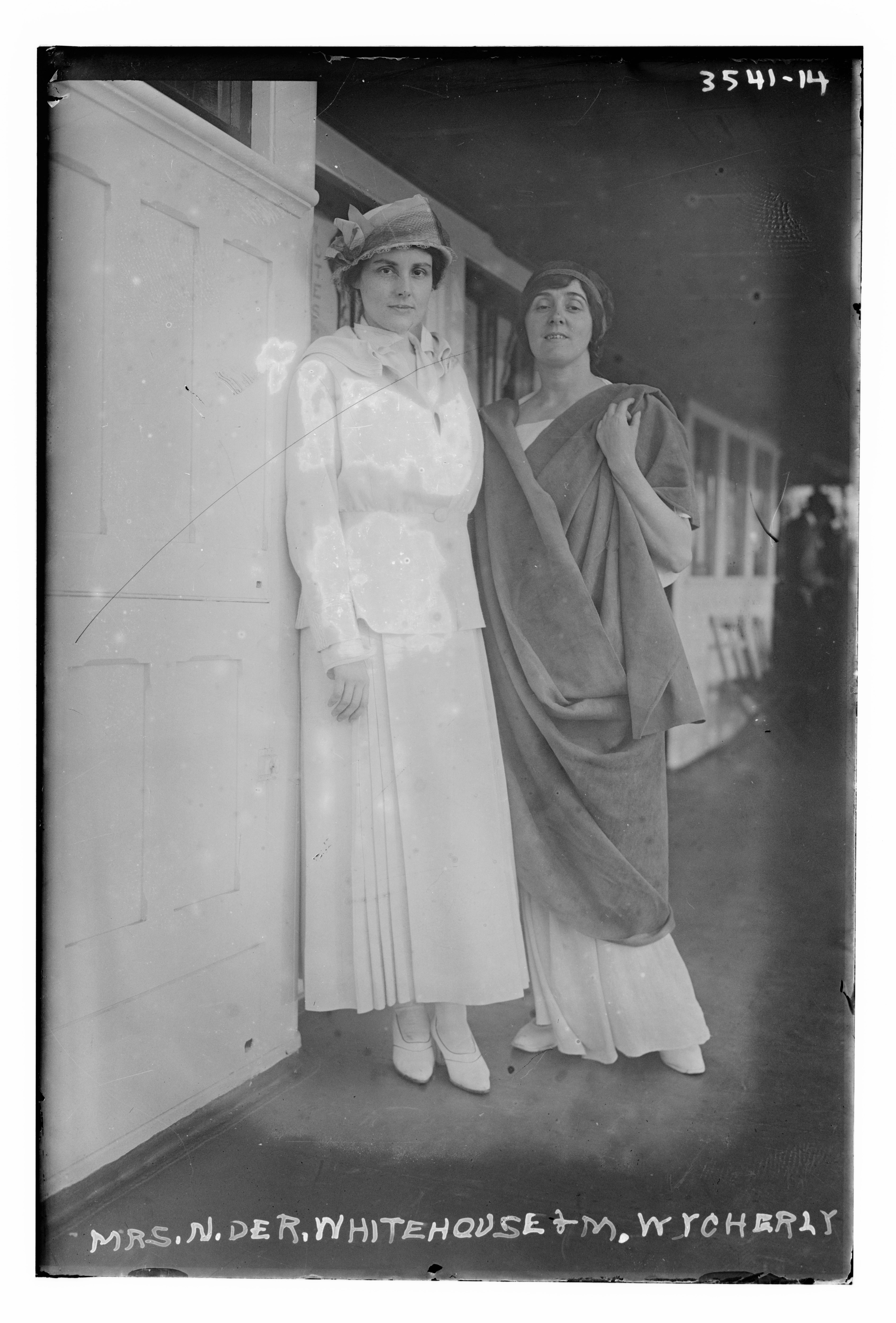
Wycherly and Vira Boarman Whitehouse

She was primarily a stage actress, appearing in one silent film. She starred in the 1907 Broadway production of The Primrose Path. In 1929, she appeared in her second film, but first talkie, The Thirteenth Chair, based on the 1916 play by her husband in which she had starred. The film was directed by Tod Browning and was in the genre of mystery-in-an-old-house melodrama. Twelve years later, Wycherley appeared in Sergeant York in 1941. She was nominated for the Academy Award for Best Supporting Actress for the role of Mother York, though perhaps her best remembered screen role was as Ma Jarrett, the mother of the psychopathic gangster Cody Jarrett, in White Heat (1949), which starred James Cagney.

Wycherly starred in several popular Broadway plays, including Mixed Marriage (1920), Tobacco Road (1933), Liliom, Six Characters in Search of an Author (1922), and The Thirteenth Chair (1916) (which role she reprised in the 1929 film of the same name). Her other films include Keeper of the Flame, The Yearling, Random Harvest, Forever Amber, The Man with a Cloak, and Johnny Angel.

She portrayed Mrs. Brown, Claudia's mother, in the American television series Claudia (1952).

== Death ==
Wycherly died on 6 June 1956 at St. Clare's Hospital in New York City, at the age of 74. She was buried at the St Mary Churchyard, Bepton, Chichester District, West Sussex, England.

== Complete filmography ==
- The Fight (1915) – Jane Thomas
- The Thirteenth Chair (1929) – Madame Rosalie La Grange
- Midnight (1934) – Mrs. Weldon
- Wanderlust (1938, Short)
- Victory (1940) – Mrs. Schomberg
- Sergeant York (1941) – Mother York
- Crossroads (1942) – Madame Pelletier
- Random Harvest (1942) – Mrs. Deventer
- Keeper of the Flame (1943) – Mrs. Forrest
- Assignment in Brittany (1943) – Mme. Henriette Corlay
- The Moon Is Down (1943) – Mme. Sarah Orden
- Hangmen Also Die! (1943) – Ludmilla Novotny
- Experiment Perilous (1944) – Maggie
- Johnny Angel (1945) – Miss Drumm
- The Yearling (1946) – Ma Forrester
- Something in the Wind (1947) – Grandma Read
- Forever Amber (1947) – Mrs. Spong
- The Loves of Carmen (1948) – Old Crone
- White Heat (1949) – Ma Jarrett
- The Man with a Cloak (1951) – Emma Flynn
- That Man from Tangier (1953) – Mrs. Sanders
- The President's Lady (1953) – Mrs. Robards

== See also ==
- List of British actors
- List of Academy Award winners and nominees from Great Britain
- List of actors with Academy Award nominations
