= There Are No Villains =

1921 film

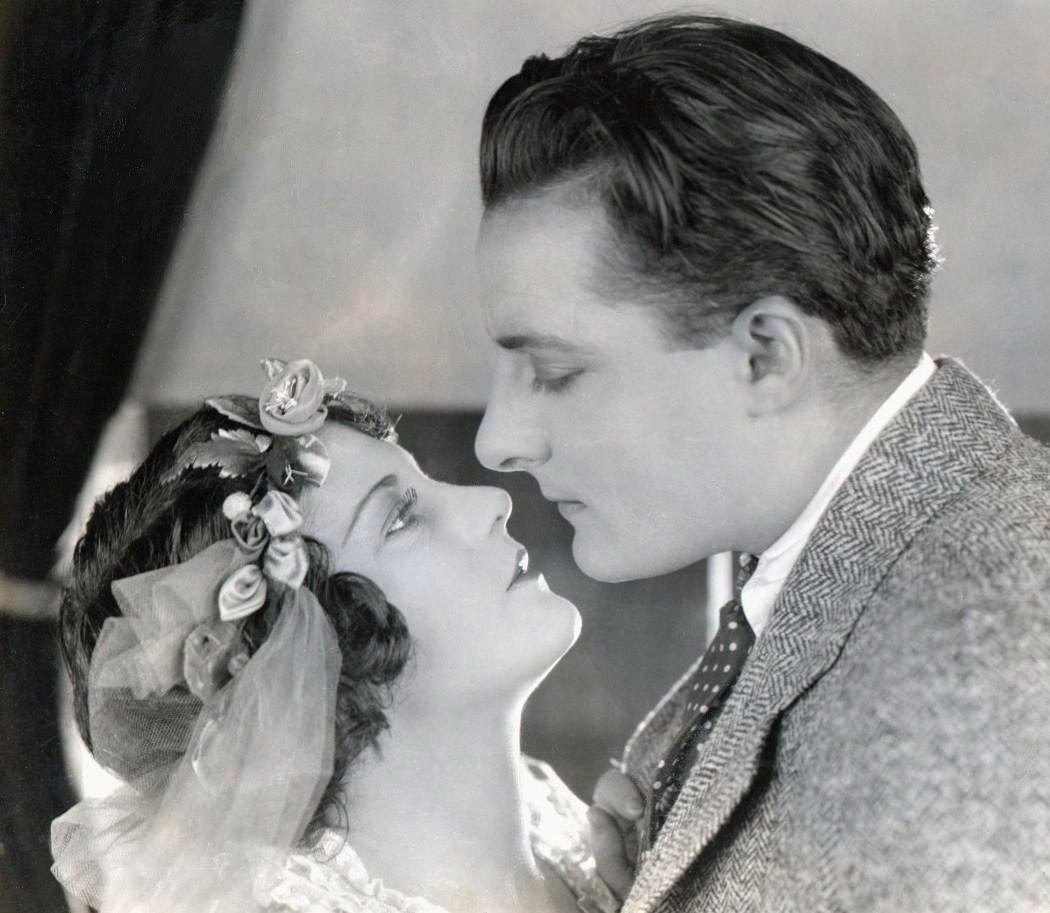
- Still with Viola Dana and Gaston Glass
- Directed by: Bayard Veiller
- Written by: Frank R. Adams (story); Mary O'Hara (adaptation)
- Produced by: Bayard Veiller
- Starring: Viola Dana
- Cinematography: John Arnold
- Distributed by: Metro Pictures
- Release date: November 14, 1921
- Running time: 5 reels
- Country: United States
- Language: Silent (English intertitles)

There Are No Villains is a lost 1921 American silent crime melodrama film starring Viola Dana and produced and directed by Bayard Veiller.

== Cast ==
- Viola Dana - Rosa Moreland
- Gaston Glass - John King
- Edward Cecil - George Sala
- DeWitt Jennings - Detective Flint
- Fred Kelsey - Dugall
- Jack Cosgrave - Reverend Stiles

== Preservation ==
With no holdings located in archives, There Are No Villains is considered a lost film.
