= Burnt Wings (1920 film) =

1920 film directed by Christy Cabanne

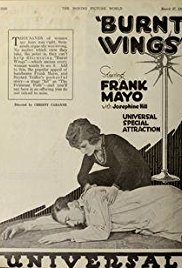
- Film poster
- Directed by: Christy Cabanne
- Written by: Hal Hoadley; Christy Cabanne; Percy Heath
- Based on: the play, "The Primrose Path" by Bayard Veiller
- Starring: Josephine Hill; Frank Mayo; Rudolph Christians
- Cinematography: Alfred Gosden
- Production company: Universal Film Mfg Co.
- Release date: March 29, 1920 (US)
- Running time: 5 reels
- Country: United States
- Language: Silent (English intertitles)

Burnt Wings is a 1920 American drama film directed by Christy Cabanne and starring Josephine Hill, Frank Mayo, and Rudolph Christians. Adapted from the play The Primrose Path, it was released on March 29, 1920.

== Plot ==
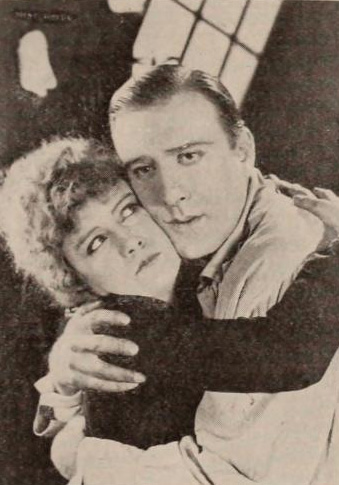
Hill and Mayo in the film

Ned Templeton is a struggling artist in Paris. Their straits become even more dire when Ned is stricken down by illness. His doctor prescribes rest and good food, in addition to medication, to get him back to health. Without money his wife, Joan Templeton, is further threatened with eviction by their landlord, who suggests that there are relatively easy ways for a pretty young woman to make money. With no other alternative, Joan seeks out a wealthy benefactor, who she has an affair with in exchange for enough money to see her and Ned by, and Ned back to health.

Once he regains his health, he begins to become successful, and the couple returns to the United States, where his career really begins to take off. Helen Cartwright is impressed by his work, and convinces her father, James, to have his portrait done by Ned, and become his patron. When James realizes that Helen is in love with Ned, he also understands that the only thing standing in the way of his daughter's happiness is Joan. He uses his influence to add to Ned's success, as well as driving a wedge between Ned and Joan, who begin drifting apart, each thinking the other no longer cares. Ned and Helen begin to draw close to one another.

As a way to drive the final spike in her marriage, James approaches Joan and offers her a large sum of money to divorce Ned. Joan refuses, but James and her both realize that it was James who was her rich benefactor in Paris. Thinking he has the trump card, James goes back to Ned and tells him of Joan's infidelity in Paris. However, it does not have the effect that he had intended. Ned realizes what Joan sacrificed for him, and tells Helen he is returning to Joan. Helen understands, and Ned and Joan are reunited.

== Cast ==
- Josephine Hill as Joan Templeton
- Frank Mayo as Ned Templeton
- Rudolph Christians as James Cartwright
- Betty Blythe as Helen
- Beatrice Burnham as Hortense

== Production ==
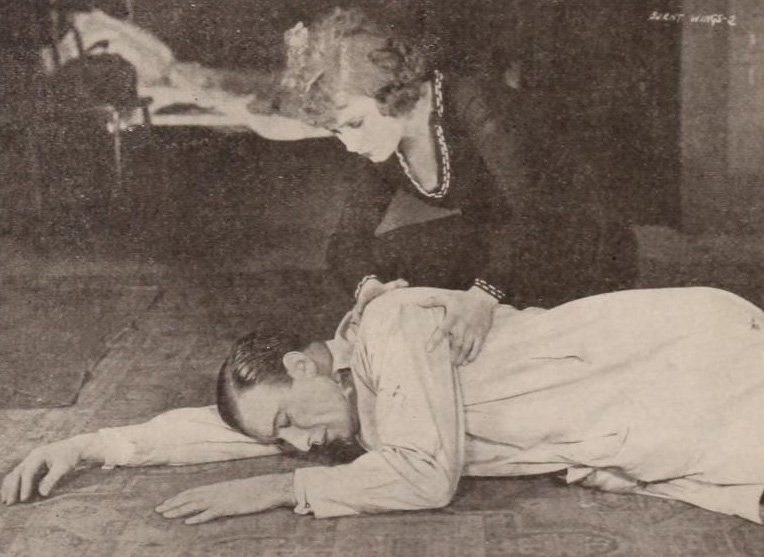
Hill discovering Mayo ill in Paris

Bayard Veiller's play had premiered on Broadway in May 1907, and had been reprised during the 1919 season. The working title of the film was The Primrose Path, the same as Veiller's play. In December 1919 it was announced that the play was being adapted for the screen by Universal. Initially, Lola Gonzales was tagged for the lead role of Joan Templeton. Gonzales was a professional model. However, a week later, it was announced that Josephine Hill had replaced Gonzales in the cast. At the same time it was announced that Frank Mayo, Mae Busch, Beatrice Burnham, and Rudolph Christians were also members of the cast. In early January 1920, the name was changed to Burnt Wings. The picture wrapped filming by mid-February 1920. In February it was announced that the picture would be released on March 29, 1920.

== Reception ==
Exhibitors Herald gave the film a good review. They complimented both the production and the direction, and singled out the performances of Frank Mayo, Josephine Hill, and Betty Blythe. They were also complimentary of the writing work of Bayard Veiller. Motion Picture News gave the film a more average review, calling it "Just an ordinary program feature". They complimented the work of Mayo, Hill, and Blythe, and particularly highlighted the character work of Rudolph Christians. They felt the cinematography, direction, and settings were average. The Moving Picture World enjoyed the picture. While they did not care for the subject matter of the film, they felt the acting was very good. They felt Hill, though inexperienced, did quite well as Mayo's wife, and said that Blythe played her role "with charm". They were especially complimentary of Christians, in his role as the film's heavy. They particularly enjoyed the staging of the film, with "...some beautiful exteriors and interiors.
