= The Thirteenth Chair (1919 film) =

1919 American film directed by Léonce Perret

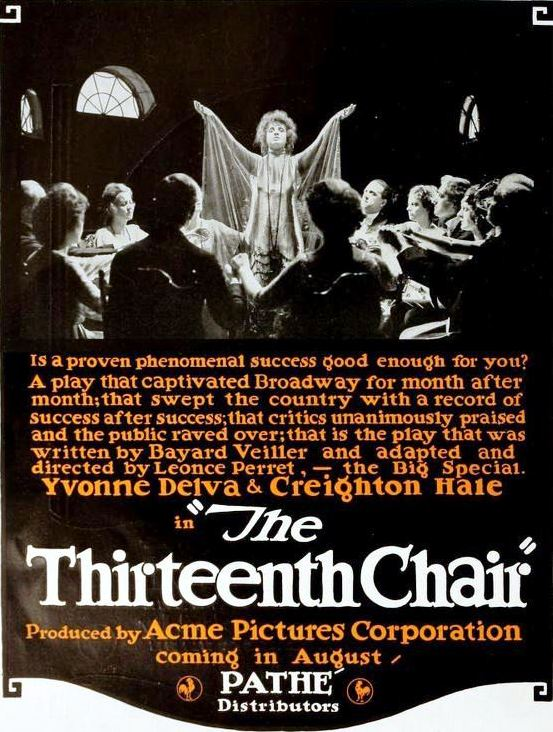
- Directed by: Léonce Perret
- Written by: Léonce Perret
- Based on: The Thirteenth Chair; 1916 play by Bayard Veiller
- Starring: Yvonne Delva; Creighton Hale; Marie Shotwell
- Cinematography: Alfred Ortlieb
- Production company: Acme Pictures Corporation
- Distributed by: Pathé Exchange
- Release date: August 23, 1919
- Running time: 60 minutes
- Country: United States
- Languages: Silent; English intertitles

The Thirteenth Chair is a lost 1919 American silent mystery film directed by Léonce Perret and starring Yvonne Delva, Creighton Hale and Marie Shotwell. It was based on a play of the same name by Bayard Veiller. Subsequent film adaptations were made in 1929 as The Thirteenth Chair and 1937 again under the same title.

== Cast ==
- Yvonne Delva as Helen O'Neil
- Creighton Hale as Willy Grosby
- Marie Shotwell as Madame LaGrange
- Christine May as Mrs. Philip Mason
- Suzanne Colbert as Helen Trent
- Georges Deneubourg as Edward Wales
- Marc McDermott as Stephen Lee
- Walter Law as Inspector Donohue
- Fraunie Fraunholz

== Preservation ==
With no holdings located in archives, The Thirteenth Chair is considered a lost film.

== Bibliography ==
- John T. Soister, Henry Nicolella, Steve Joyce. American Silent Horror, Science Fiction and Fantasy Feature Films, 1913-1929. McFarland, 2014.
