= Muriel Starr =

Canadian stage actress

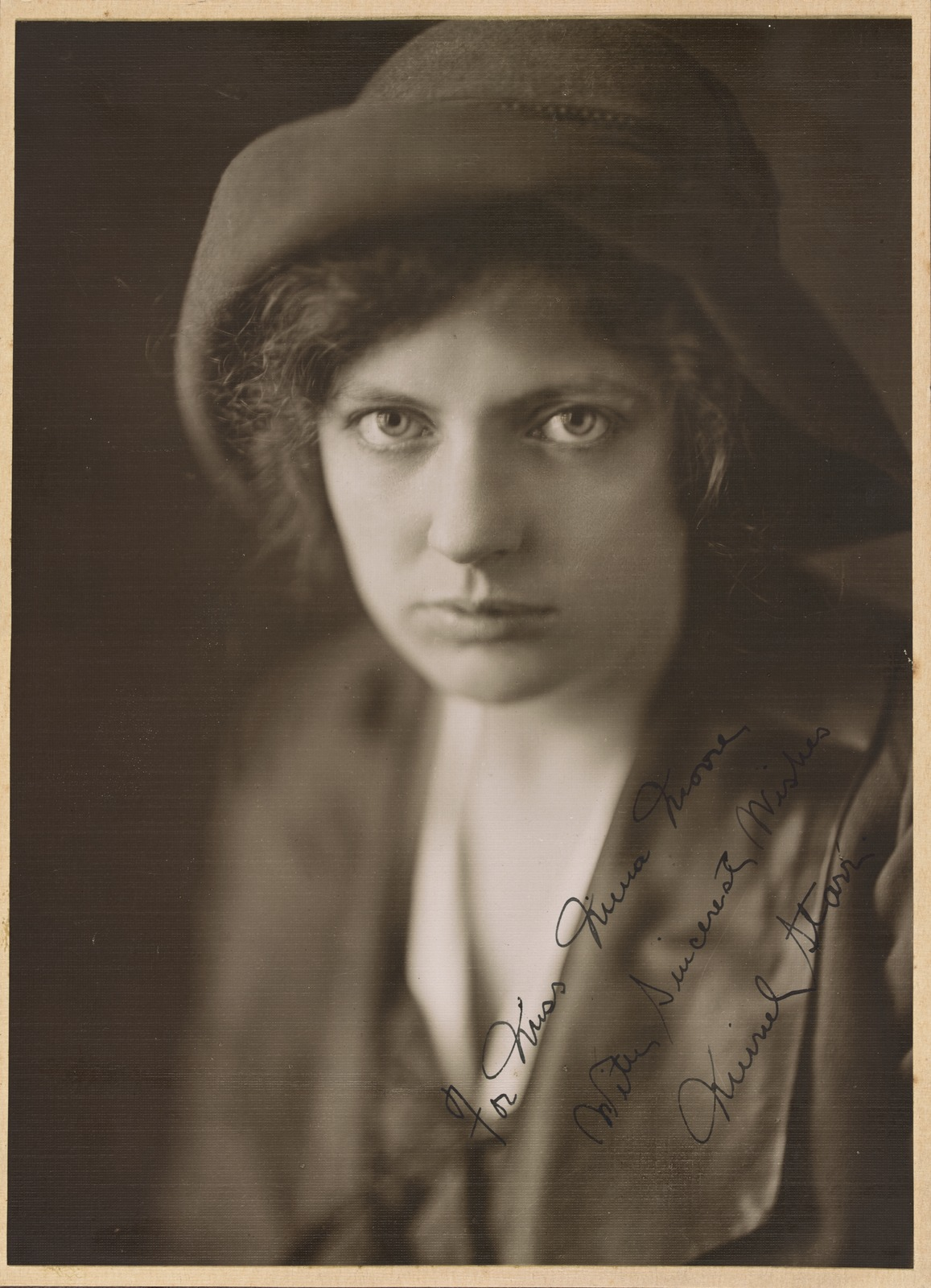
- Portrait of Muriel Starr, c. 1913
- Born: 20 February 1888
- Died: 19 April 1950 (aged 62)

Muriel Starr (20 February 1888 – 19 April 1950) was a Canadian stage actress. She was particularly popular in Australia in the 1910s and 1920s. She appeared in one film, Within the Law (1916), an adaptation of her stage success. She was also known for the plays East of Suez, Birds of Paradise and Madame X.

== Early years ==
Starr was born near Montreal in a lumber camp. Her work in an 1894 production of Shore Acres led The Washington Post to say, "Little Muriel Starr ... is one of the sweetest stage children ever seen in Washington." By 1902 she had a "singing and dancing specialty" in addition to her acting.

== Australia ==
Starr was a favorite of Australian audiences, and at one time considered settling there. In 1913–1915 she toured Within the Law for J. C. Williamson, followed by Mid-Channel, Madame X, The Yellow Ticket, Bought and Paid For, Under Cover and The Law of the Land in which she could play strong emotion. She was less successful in the comedies The Chorus Lady and especially Sunday

She returned in December 1917 for Hugh J. Ward with Richard Walton Tully's The Bird of Paradise, followed by The Easiest Way, The Man Who Came Back, Nobody's Widow, The Great Divide, Common Clay, Silent Witness and her famous pieces Within the Law and Bought and Paid For. A cousin, Norma Mitchell, accompanied her and played support roles. Her male lead, Louis Kimball (1889–1936), received good notices. Before leaving, she married W. Hartwell Johnston at the Registry Office in Sydney. Her cousin and her mother, Mrs O'Loughlin, also cited as Mrs Hughie MacIver, were present at the ceremony. Mr Johnston was managing director of the Wrigley Company in Australia.

Her third season in Australia began in April 1924 and brought new plays: Robert Hichens' The Garden of Allah, East of Suez, The Pelican, The Skin Game, and Secrets and revivals of Silent Witness, Bought and Paid For, and Madame X, possibly her greatest role. In Melbourne she tried a revival of The Silver King when Within the Law failed to draw the usual crowds. While in Melbourne, she swerved her car onto the wrong side of the road to avoid a stationary vehicle, mounting the footpath and crushing a pedestrian, causing serious injuries. She was charged with dangerous driving, but found not guilty. Her farewell performances in regional centres included French Leave, The Sign on the Door, and Outcast.

In 1927, she reprised a string of her starring roles at the Palace Theatre, Sydney and momentarily saved it from conversion to a movie theatre. Harvey Adams, her leading man in many plays from 1925, now also served as producer. New plays included The House of Glass, Cornered, Robert H. McLaughlin's The Eternal Magdalene, The Goldfish, The Donovan Affair, Whispering Wires, The Last Warning, Nice People, Sweeney Todd, The Hole in the Wall and Shooting Shadows. This last play was reviewed scathingly in Adelaide and not attempted elsewhere.

In May 1930, she declared herself bankrupt, owing £3,427 (perhaps a million dollars in today's money), mostly to J. C. Williamson. The judge granted her an unconditional discharge on the grounds that her creditors knew the risks inherent in show business and so she was able legally to return to America.

== Radio ==
Starr portrayed Mrs. Garvin on the NBC radio serial Young Widder Brown. Other radio programs on which she performed included Amanda of Honeymoon Hill, Kitty Foyle, and Just Plain Bill.

== Personal life and death ==
In late 1918 she married W. Hartwell Johnston, an American business manager in Sydney. Starr died on 19 April 1950 in her dressing room at the St Johns Theatre in New York while appearing in the production The Velvet Glove.

== Broadway roles ==
- Going Some (1909) as Jeane Chapin
- A Man of Honor (1911)
- The Stranger (1911) as Mary Washington
- The Right to Happiness (1912)
- The Truth Wagon (1912) as Heen Dean
- The Indiscretion of Truth (1912)
- Gamblers All (1917)
- John Hawthorne (1921) as Laura Smart
- The Star-Wagon (1937) as Angela and as herb woman
- On the Rocks (1938) as Lady Chavender
- Case History (1938) as Ann
- Outward Bound (1938) as Mrs. Clivedon-Banks (replacement)
- The Velvet Glove (1949) as Sister Athanasius
