= The Primrose Path (Veiller) =

The Primrose Path is a play in four acts by Bayard Veiller. It played on Broadway in 1907, and was later adapted into the films The Primrose Path (1915) and Burnt Wings (1920). It should not be confused with the play of the same name by Robert Buckner and Walter Hart which ran on Broadway in 1939.

== Plot ==
The play begins in Devon, England where the painter Ned Templeton becomes romantically involved with Joan Treghenna. Templeton goes to Paris in hopes of becoming a famous artist, and Joan accompanies him. There they struggle to survive, and Ned becomes seriously ill. In order to obtain the money necessary for food and medicine to save Ned's life, Joan prostitutes herself. Ned survives, and the couple relocate once again to New York City. There Ned manages to sell one of his paintings, The Primrose Path, for a significant sum to James Cartright, a millionaire. His newly found patron provides him support. As his success is rising, his love for Joan diminishes and the relationship ends, breaking Joan's heart. He forms a new romantic attachment to Cartright's daughter Helen. On her own, Joan survives by working as model in the studios of other artists. One day Helen and Ned stumble across her while randomly visiting one of the studios she is working in. Joan confides in Helen what all has transpired between her and Ned in the past. Ned and Joan meet in one final scene with Ned displaying a change of heart. Joan, however, denounces the painter in front of Helen, and resolves to return home to England on her own.

== History ==
The Primrose Path was given its premiere on April 1, 1907 at the Hyperion Theatre in New Haven, Connecticut with a cast led by Margaret Wycherly who portrayed the main character of Joan. It then toured to the Lyric Theatre in Buffalo, New York the Colonial Theatre in Cleveland, Ohio, and the Shubert Theatre in Brooklyn (not the Broadway theatre which was built in 1910). It transferred to Broadway's Majestic Theatre where it opened on May 6, 1907. It had a brief run and was a commercial failure for the Majestic, but was a critical success for Wycherly who was reviewed well by the New York press. Other members in the cast included Sheldon Lewis as Ned Templeton, Charles Reigel as James Cartright, Sarah Whiteford as Helen Cartright, Ralph Lewis as Horace West, John Kloville as Louis Giroux, and Minnette Barrett as Hortense Madigan among others.

The play was later adapted into the 1915 silent film The Primrose Path which was directed by Theodore Marston. It was adapted into a second silent film, Burnt Wings (1920), which was directed by Christy Cabanne.
