= Within the Law (1939 film) =

1939 film by Gustav Machatý

- Directed by: Gustav Machatý
- Screenplay by: Charles Lederer; Edith Fitzgerald
- Based on: Within the Law; 1912 play by Miklós László
- Produced by: Lou L. Ostrow
- Starring: Ruth Hussey; Tom Neal; Paul Kelly; William Gargan; Paul Cavanagh; Rita Johnson
- Cinematography: Charles Lawton Jr.
- Edited by: George Boemler
- Music by: William Axt
- Production company: Metro-Goldwyn-Mayer
- Distributed by: Loew's Inc.
- Release date: March 17, 1939
- Running time: 65 minutes
- Country: United States
- Language: English

Within the Law is a 1939 American (Precursor) Film noir crime film directed by Gustav Machatý and written by Charles Lederer and Edith Fitzgerald. The film stars Ruth Hussey, Tom Neal, Paul Kelly, William Gargan, Paul Cavanagh, and Rita Johnson. The film was released on March 17, 1939, by Metro-Goldwyn-Mayer.

The film is based on the play Within the Law by Bayard Veiller.

== Plot ==
Mary Turner gets arrested for a robbery she didn't commit. While in prison she studies law. After being released, she partners with another woman to legally scam wealthy men and to get revenge on the man who sent her to prison.

== Cast ==
- Ruth Hussey as Mary Turner
- Tom Neal as Richard Gilder
- Paul Kelly as Joe Garson
- William Gargan as Cassidy
- Paul Cavanagh as English Eddie
- Rita Johnson as Agnes
- Samuel S. Hinds as Mr. Gilder
- Lynne Carver as June
- Sidney Blackmer as George Demarest
- Jo Ann Sayers as Helen Morris
- Ann Morriss as Saleswoman
- James Burke as 'Red'
- Don Douglas as Inspector Burke
- Cliff Clark as McGuire
- Claude King as Art Dealer
- Frank Orth as Jim Jenks
