= The Thirteenth Chair (1937 film) =

1937 film by George B. Seitz

- Directed by: George B. Seitz
- Screenplay by: Marion Parsonnet
- Based on: The Thirteenth Chair; 1916 play by Bayard Veiller
- Starring: May Whitty; Lewis Stone; Madge Evans; Elissa Landi
- Cinematography: Charles G. Clarke
- Edited by: W. Donn Hayes
- Music by: David Snell
- Production company: Metro-Goldwyn-Mayer
- Distributed by: Loew's Inc.
- Release date: May 7, 1937
- Running time: 66 minutes
- Country: United States
- Language: English

The Thirteenth Chair is a 1937 American mystery film directed by George B. Seitz and starring Dame May Whitty, Lewis Stone, Madge Evans, and Elissa Landi. It is based on the 1916 stage play of the same title by Bayard Veiller. This was the third film adaptation of the play. There was an earlier version by director Tod Browning in 1929, with Bela Lugosi in a supporting role, and an even earlier 1919 silent film adaptation that starred Creighton Hale.

== Plot ==
In Calcutta, India, Scotland Yard Inspector Marney and local police Commissioner Grimshaw discuss the murder of Leonard Lee as they approach the bungalow where he was stabbed in the back. Grimshaw succinctly describes the victim as “rotten”.

John Wales is inside the supposedly locked house. Lee was his best friend. Wales proposes a séance, not to raise spirits, but to put psychological pressure on suspects. They agree, and Grimshaw calls the Governor, Sir Roscoe Crosby, to make arrangements.

At the Governor's residence, the participants gather: the Governor and his wife, Lady Crosby; their daughter, Helen Trent and her husband, Major Lionel Trent; their son, Dick Crosby, and his mother's secretary, Nell O'Neill, who is secretly engaged to Dick; Dr. Mason; Mary Eastwood; Professor Feringeea; Mr. Stanby and his emotionally unstable sister, Miss Stanby; and Wales himself.

The medium, Mme. Rosalie La Grange is a grandmotherly woman with a lower-class accent. After demonstrating some tricks (floating tables and disembodied knocking), she promises that there will be no trickery tonight. When the ladies withdraw to witness a body search, she has a cryptic conversation with Nell.

Doors and windows are locked. Thirteen people sit in a circle. At Mary's suggestion, La Grange is tied to her chair, with guests' handkerchiefs. The lights go out; they all clasp hands. We hear La Grange's voice and Wales's. Wales asks repeatedly “Do you know who killed you?” and falls silent. People call to him; he does not reply. The lights come on, revealing Wales, sitting in his chair, dead from a stab wound to the heart.

Inspector Marney locks down the site. If Wales was right, he observes, someone in this room killed Leonard Lee. Someone in the room certainly killed Wales. Mason finds Nell's handkerchief on the floor, shows it to Marney and returns it to her. The knife cannot be found.

The investigation reveals many motives and dishes up some red herrings. Nell admits that La Grange is her mother. The medium is astonished to learn that this makes no difference to the Crosby family: They love Nell. Then Marney tricks Nell into admitting that she visited Lee the night he was killed. She went there to retrieve Helen's love letters. Helen denies this, and Marney plans to arrest Nell. La Grange begs him for time alone, in the dark. Weeping, she appeals to the heavens for a true message. It is the Inspector who knocks, but the message is real, she says, pointing to the knife embedded in the ceiling.

There are no fingerprints on it, and Marney remembers Nell's handkerchief, which shows a blood spot. Her mother begs for a chance to identify the killer. They recreate the séance, with Wales' body propped up in his chair. The Inspector warns everyone to be very aware of their neighbors' hands. The action of a hand may give the murderer away. In the dark, Nell cries out that Wales is moving. The lights flash on to show Wales' upraised arm pointing to the knife in the ceiling. The Inspector asks Mason to show his hands, which are quite clean. They should not be. Dick smeared lampblack on his hand; his mother's hand is now stained.because they reached across Mason. Proof that Mason kept out of the circle, just as he did when he killed Wales. Ironic, Marney says—Wales never suspected him for a moment.

== Cast ==
- Dame May Whitty as Mme. Rosalie La Grange
- Madge Evans as Nell O'Neill
- Lewis Stone as Inspector Marney
- Elissa Landi as Helen Trent
- Thomas Beck as Dick Crosby
- Henry Daniell as John Wales
- Janet Beecher as Lady Crosby
- Ralph Forbes as Lionel Trent
- Holmes Herbert as Sir Roscoe Crosby
- Heather Thatcher as Mary Eastwood
- Charles Trowbridge as Dr. Mason
- Robert Coote as Stanby
- Elsa Buchanan as Grace Stanby
- Lal Chand Mehra as Professor Feringeea
- Neil Fitzgerald as Constable
- Louis Vincenot as Chotee
- Matthew Boulton as Commissioner Grimshaw
