= Within the Law (1923 film) =

1923 film by Frank Lloyd

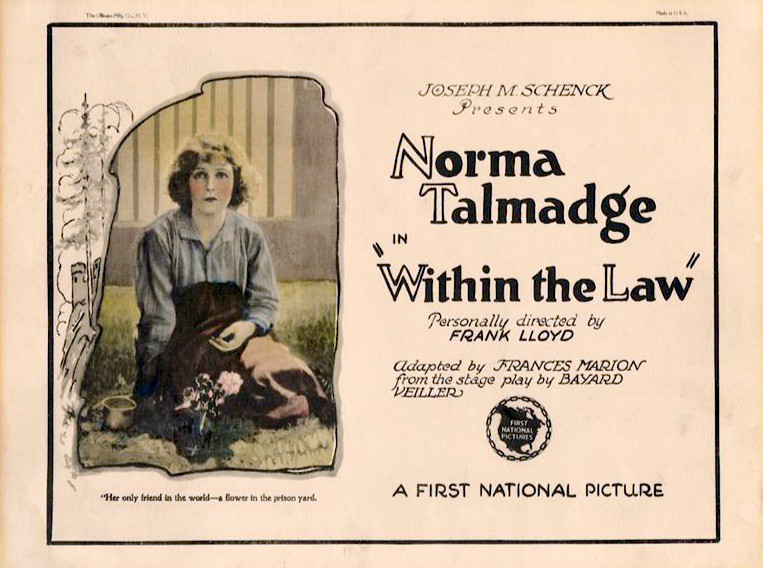
- Theatrical poster
- Directed by: Frank Lloyd
- Written by: Frances Marion (scenario)
- Based on: Within the Law; a Melodrama in Four Acts; 1917 play by Bayard Veiller
- Produced by: Joseph M. Schenck
- Starring: Norma Talmadge
- Cinematography: Tony Gaudio; Norbert Brodine
- Edited by: Hal C. Kern
- Distributed by: Associated First National
- Release date: April 30, 1923
- Running time: 8 reels; 8,034 feet
- Country: United States
- Language: Silent (English intertitles)

Within the Law is a 1923 American silent drama film directed by Frank Lloyd and starring Norma Talmadge. In 2009, the film was released on DVD along with Talmadge's 1926 film Kiki. Jane Cowl had starred in the original 1912 Broadway production of Bayard Veiller's play of the same name about a young woman who is sent to prison and comes out seeking revenge.

== Cast ==
- Norma Talmadge as Mary Turner
- Lew Cody as Joe Garson
- Jack Mulhall as Richard Gilder, his son
- Eileen Percy as Aggie Lynch
- Joseph Kilgour as Edward Gilder
- Arthur Stuart Hull as George Demarest (credited as Arthur F. Hull)
- Helen Ferguson as Helen Morris
- Lincoln Plumer as Sergeant Cassidy (credited as Lincoln Plummer)
- Tom Ricketts as General Hastings (credited as Thomas Ricketts)
- Ward Crane as English Eddie
- Catherine Murphy as Gilder's Secretary
- DeWitt Jennings as Inspector Burke (credited DeWitt C. Jennings)
- Lionel Belmore as Irwin, his attorney
- Eddie Boland as Darcy
