= The Thirteenth Chair (play) =

Play by Bayard Veiller

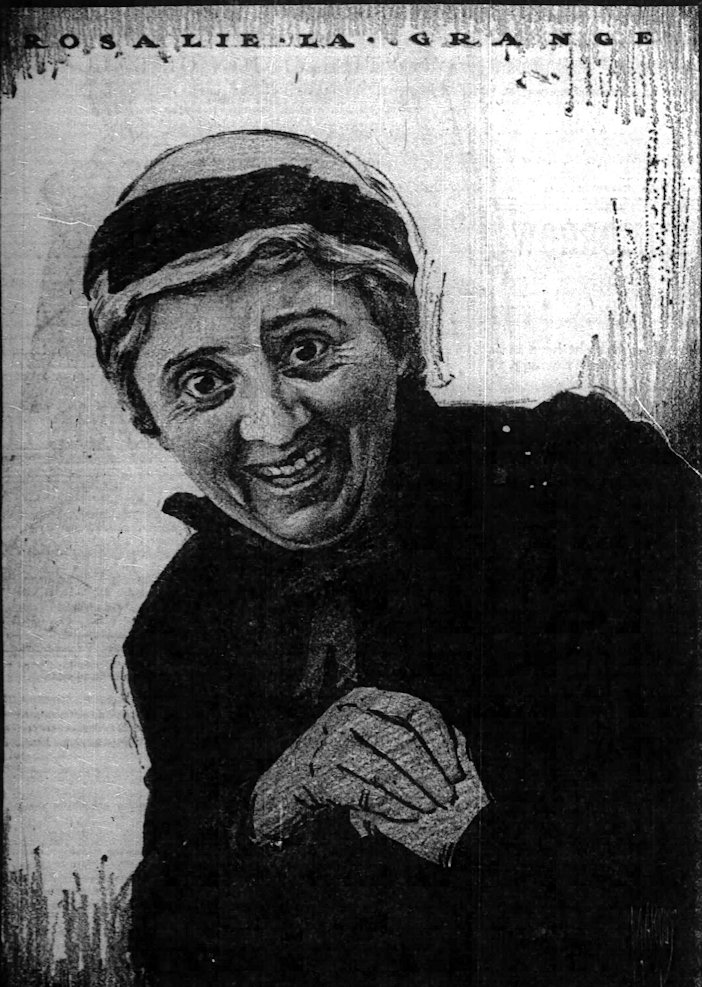
- Margaret Wycherly
- Original language: English
- Written by: Bayard Veiller
- Based on: Stories by Will Irwin
- Subject: Murder during seance and locked-room mystery
- Genre: Melodrama
- Setting: The Italian room of a mansion, New York City, 1916

Premiere
- Date: November 20, 1916
- Place: 48th Street Theatre
- Directed by: William Harris Sr. and William Harris Jr.

The Thirteenth Chair is a 1916 play by the American writer Bayard Veiller. It has three acts and a single setting. The action takes place entirely in the drawing room of a large house in New York City during one evening. One critic labelled it a melodrama using mystery fiction devices: a murder during a seance, and a locked-room mystery. There are no clues given to the audience to identify the murderer, who is exposed only by supernatural agency in the last act.

It was first produced and staged by William Harris and his son William Harris Jr., and starred Margaret Wycherly. After a brief tryout in New Haven, Connecticut, it premiered on Broadway during November 1916, where it ran until September 1917 for 350 performances. Following its Broadway season, the original production went on tour, while a separate company opened in the West End theatre district of London.

The play was adapted for a 1919 silent film, and an early sound film in 1929. The latter may have been just as much a source as the play for a 1937 movie.

== Characters ==
Characters are listed in order of appearance within their scope.

Lead

- Helen O'Neill, called Nell, is secretary to Mrs. Crosby and fiancée of Will Crosby.
- Roscoe Crosby is about 60, a wealthy self-made business man, a former clerk who married a school teacher.
- Rosalie La Grange is an old-looking fifty, an Irish-born medium with an impish sense of humor.

Supporting

- William Crosby, called Will or Billy, is the son of Roscoe and Mrs. Crosby. He has his own business.
- Mrs. Crosby, called Alicia, is 55, the mother of Will Crosby and Helen Trent. She is kind, generous, and cheerful.
- Mary Eastwood is a young single woman, a teasing skeptic of Rosalie's powers.
- Helen Trent is daughter to Mr. and Mrs. Crosby, recently married, formerly sought after by Spencer Lee. (Note: Playwrights avoid having two characters share a first name unless the storyline requires it, as here.)
- Tim Donohue is about 50, an educated police detective, the inspector investigating both murders.

Featured

- Edward Wales has invited Rosalie to the Crosby mansion, hoping to solve an earlier murder. (Note: This character with the evocative name has nothing to do with the then Prince of Wales.)
- Braddish Trent, called Brad, is the husband of Helen Crosby Trent.
- Howard Standish is a young man who knew Spencer Lee and thought he was no good.
- Grace Standish is the sister of Howard Standish.
- Philip Mason is a painter, recently returned from years in Paris, the most open-minded about Rosalie's power.
- Elizabeth Erskine, called Daisy, is a young attractive guest, who wishes Will had chosen her.
- Pollock is the butler at the Crosby mansion.
- Sergeant Dunn, called Mike by Donohue, is a plain-clothes detective.

Bit Part

- Policeman comes down the massive chimney at Sgt. Dunn's order in Act III, in order to search for the knife. (Note: Despite having three lines, this part is not listed in cast lists from newspapers or the published play.)

Voice only

- Doolan is a policeman stationed outside the mansion, assisting Inspector Donohue and Sergeant Dunn.

Off stage

- Spencer Lee was a friend of Edward Wales, murdered by an unknown assailant several weeks earlier.
- Mrs. MacPherson is a police matron, summoned to search the women in the play.

== Synopsis ==
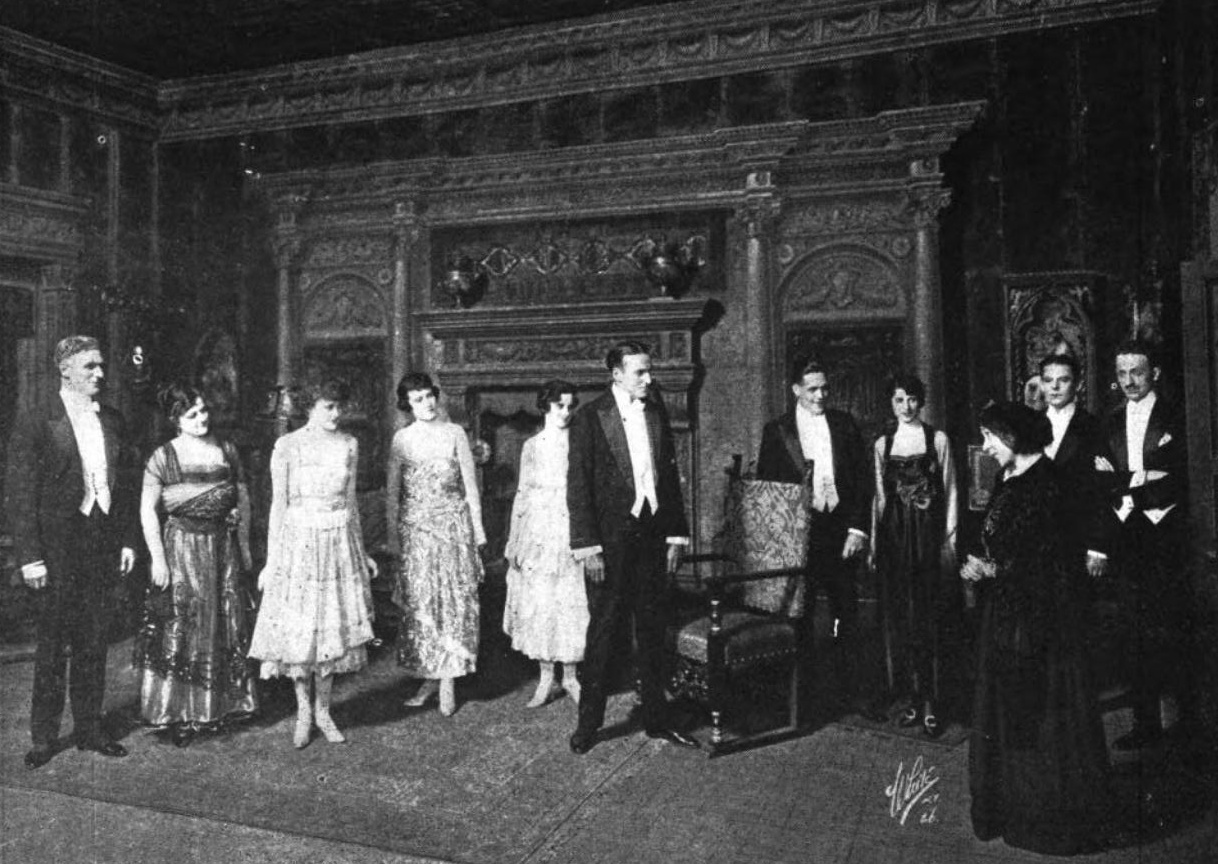

Act I (The Italian room of the Crosby mansion, New York City, evening.) The play opens just after dinner has finished and the guests are coming into the Italian room. Mrs. Crosby assures Will and Nell everyone is already aware of their impending marriage, but Edward Wales won't congratulate them. He has reason, he tells an upset Will. As the other guests stroll in, Pollock announces the arrival of Rosalie La Grange. Though baited by Miss Eastwood, Rosalie holds her own, disclosing how other mediums do their tricks, and promising tonight will be straight. Helen O'Neill and Rosalie have a brief aside, in which only the audience learns they are daughter and mother. Chairs are placed in a circle for the seance. Crosby has Pollock lock all the doors from the outside. As they sit, (Note: The published play prints the order in which the characters should sit, with Rosalie in the center facing the audience, and Edward Wales across from her with his back to them.) Miss Erskine observes they are thirteen. Rosalie is tied hands and ankles to her chair. The lights are turned out; Rosalie moans and speaks in the voice of a little girl. She says Spencer Lee wants Ned to ask who killed him. Edward Wales does, but before an answer comes he shrieks and collapses forward. The light is turned on, and the circle broken. Crosby orders Pollock, standing just outside the room, to phone the police and keep the doors locked until they arrive. (Curtain)

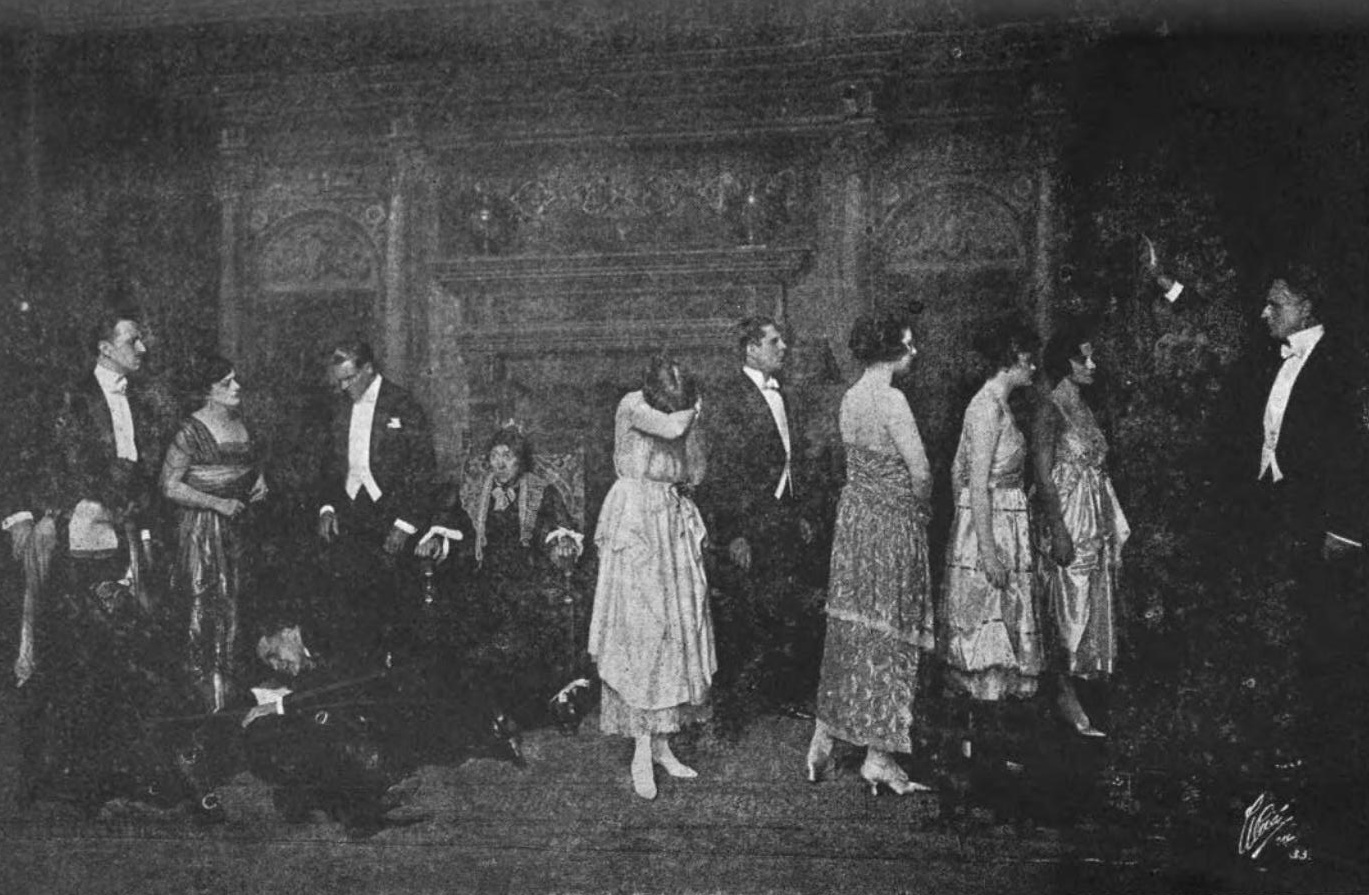

Act II (Same, 10 minutes later.) Edward's body has been moved to a settee and covered with a drape. Rosalie is still tied in chair. Inspector Donohue and Sgt. Dunn arrive and are briefed by Mr. Crosby, with pointed interjections by both Miss Eastwood and Rosalie. The settee with the body is taken to another room. Rosalie helps rearrange the guests around the chairs in the order they were during the murder, but she tries to place her daughter Helen away from where Wales sat. Donohue traps Helen O'Neill into confessing her relationship to Rosalie. As no knife has been discovered, Donohue summons Mrs. MacPherson to search the ladies while Sgt. Dunn searches the men, to no avail. (Curtain)

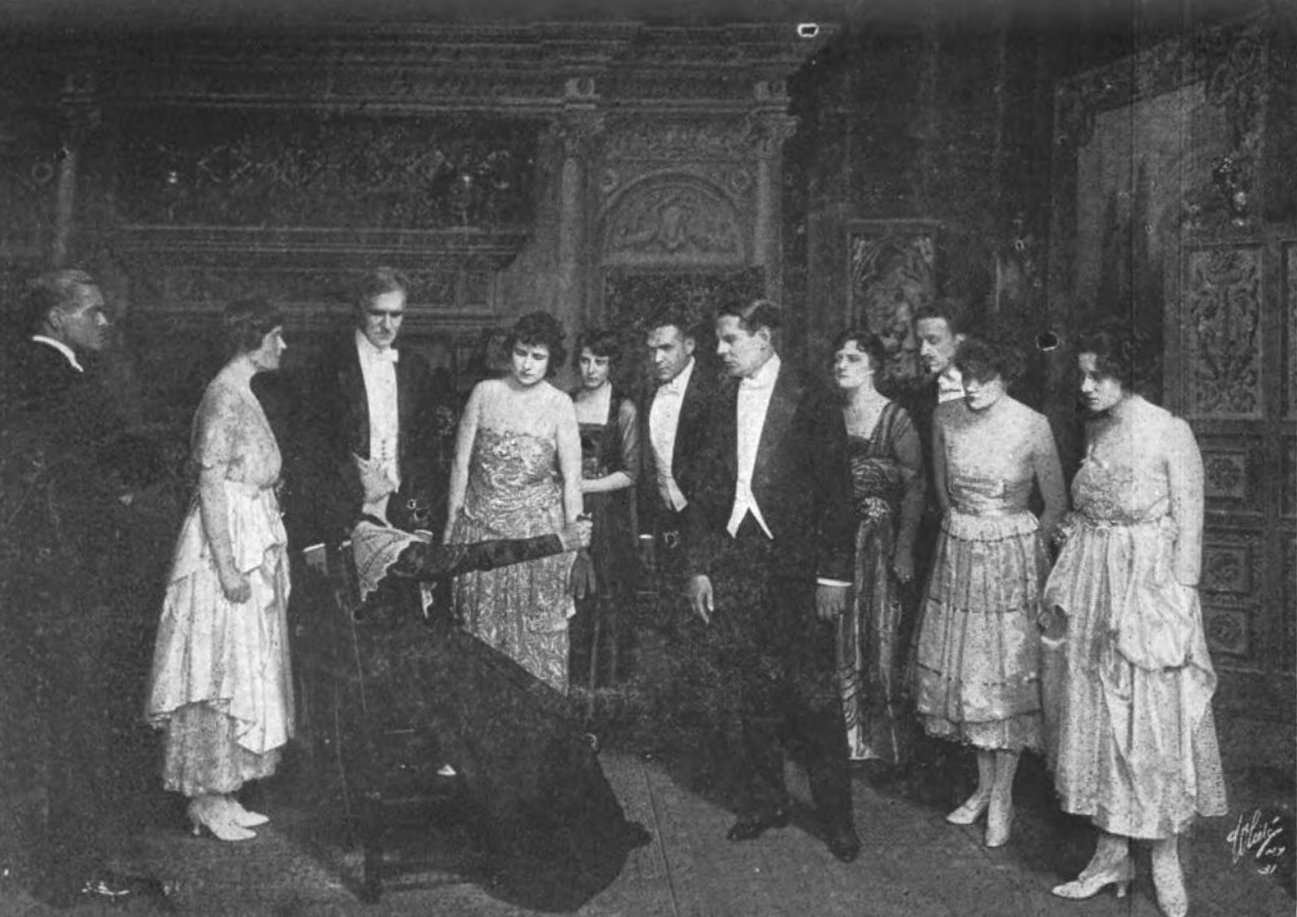

Act III (Same, 30 minutes later.) Inspector Donahue now reveals Helen O'Neill's fingerprints match those on items in Spencer Lee's room. Rosalie insists Nell is innocent, and persuades her to reveal who she is protecting. Nell says Helen Trent asked her to recover letters she wrote to Spencer. But Helen Trent flatly denies it, startling Helen O'Neill. Donohue is set to arrest Nell, but Rosalie asks him for time to expose the real murderer. Summoning everyone back to the room, Rosalie goes into a trance. Suddenly the voice of Edward Wales is heard, proclaiming the last to enter is the killer. As that person steps into the room, the knife falls at their feet from where it had been thrown into the ceiling. The murderer then confesses to both crimes. As Dunn removes them, Donohue shakes Rosalie's hand. (Curtain)

== Original production ==
=== Background ===
Playwright Bayard Veiller reportedly said he wrote The Thirteenth Chair in order to give "a great human interest role" to his wife, Margaret Wycherly. An article in The New York Times reported that the play "is based on a story of the same title", without specifying author, length, or date. However, a later profile of Bayard Veiller in The Times says the play was based on stories by Will Irwin, in which the character Rosalie La Grange figures.

This was the first and last play produced by father-son team William Harris and William Harris Jr. Harris Sr. was a veteran stage producer, while Harris Jr. had produced his first stage work the year before. Harris Sr. suffered a fatal heart attack five days after the premiere of The Thirteenth Chair.

=== Cast ===
Principal cast during the New Haven tryout and the Broadway run.
Role	Actor	Dates	Notes and sources
Helen O' Neill	Katherine La Salle	Nov 16, 1916 - Sep 01, 1917	
Roscoe Crosby	Gardner Crane	Nov 16, 1916 - Sep 01, 1917	
Rosalie La Grange	Margaret Wycherly	Nov 16, 1916 - Sep 01, 1917	Wycherly received a part interest in the play as a Christmas gift from her playwright husband.
William Crosby	Calvin Thomas	Nov 16, 1916 - Sep 01, 1917	
Mrs. Crosby	Martha Mayo	Nov 16, 1916 - Sep 01, 1917	
Mary Eastwood	Eva Condon	Nov 16, 1916 - Sep 01, 1917	
Helen Trent	Sarah Whiteford	Nov 16, 1916 - Sep 01, 1917	
Tim Donohue	Harrison Hunter	Nov 16, 1916 - Sep 01, 1917	
Edward Wales	S. K. Walker	Nov 16, 1916 - Sep 01, 1917	
Braddish Trent	Charles Lait	Nov 16, 1916 - Sep 01, 1917	
Howard Standish	Walter Lewis	Nov 16, 1916 - Sep 01, 1917	
Philip Mason	George Graham	Nov 16, 1916 - Sep 01, 1917	
Elizabeth Erskine	Alice Claire Elliott	Nov 16, 1916 - Sep 01, 1917	
Pollock	A. T. Hendon	Nov 16, 1916 - Sep 01, 1917	
Sgt. Dunn	Walter Young	Nov 16, 1916 - Sep 01, 1917	
Doolan	William Scott	Nov 16, 1916 - Sep 01, 1917	

=== Tryout ===
The Thirteenth Chair had its first public performance at the Shubert Theatre in New Haven, Connecticut, on November 16, 1916. It was originally reported that the play would then open on November 20, 1916, at Boston's Hollis Street Theatre, but the sudden failure of Object Matrimony at the 48th Street Theatre in Manhattan caused owner William A. Brady to select The Thirteenth Chair as a substitute.

=== Broadway premiere ===
The production had its Broadway premiere at the 48th Street Theatre, on November 20, 1916. Charles Darnton in The Evening World said he found the play fascinating though the last act was a bit of a letdown. He reported the audience sat spellbound throughout the performance. The Brooklyn Daily Times reviewer said The Thirteenth Chair was "a rattling good show", and observed the many thrills kept the audience wriggling like "Hawaiian dancers".

The reviewer for The New York Times claimed to have spotted the murderer in Act I, and detailed how the solution came to him (Note: Given the date of the review and the absence of a byline, this was likely Brock Pemberton rather than his boss Alexander Woollcott.) without revealing the character's name. He was not impressed with the play, particularly the reliance upon the supernatural at the end, but praised the acting of everyone except one actor he named "who was too transparent", an indirect fingering of the guilty. Heywood Broun in the New York Tribune was more circumspect, but dismissed the playwright's labelling his work as a drama. With the exception of Margaret Wycherly's character, "...the interest of the play lies in happenings and not in persons, and the play is properly a melodrama."

=== Change of venue and closing ===
On August 18, 1917 the production closed at the 48th Street Theatre and re-opened at the Fulton Theatre on August 20, 1917. This was in spite of a scheduled closing in Manhattan on September 1, 1917, after 350 performances, due to a touring commitment in Philadelphia on September 3, 1917. The venue change with just two weeks to go was a courtesy extended by producer William Harris Jr. to George Broadhurst, so the latter's revival of What Happened to Jones could open on the 20th anniversary of its original premiere.

Within the United States, the original cast went on tour to Philadelphia and Boston, while three other road companies toured in other regions. London had its own production company, with Mrs Patrick Campbell in the lead when The Thirteenth Chair debuted in the West End during 1917.

== Adaptations ==
=== Film ===
- The Thirteenth Chair (1919) silent film directed by Léonce Perret.
- The Thirteenth Chair (1929) directed by Tod Browning and starring Conrad Nagel.
- The Thirteenth Chair (1937) directed by George B. Seitz and featuring Madge Evans and Elissa Landi.

== Bibliography ==
- Goble, Alan. The Complete Index to Literary Sources in Film. Walter de Gruyter, 1999.
- Lachman, Marvin. The Villainous Stage: Crime Plays on Broadway and in the West End. McFarland, 2014.
- Pitts, Michael R. Thrills Untapped: Neglected Horror, Science Fiction and Fantasy Films, 1928-1936. McFarland, 2018.
- Veiller, Bayard. The Thirteenth Chair: A Play in Three Acts. Samuel French, 1922.
