= The Trial of Mary Dugan (1941 film) =

1941 film by Norman Z. McLeod

- Theatrical release poster
- Directed by: Norman Z. McLeod
- Screenplay by: Bayard Veiller
- Based on: The Trial of Mary Dugan; 1927 play by Bayard Veiller
- Produced by: Edwin H. Knopf
- Starring: Laraine Day; Robert Young; Tom Conway; Frieda Inescort; John Litel; Marsha Hunt; Marjorie Main; Henry O'Neill
- Cinematography: George J. Folsey
- Edited by: George Boemler
- Production company: Metro-Goldwyn-Mayer
- Distributed by: Loew's Inc.
- Release date: February 14, 1941
- Running time: 87 minutes
- Country: United States
- Language: English

The Trial of Mary Dugan is a 1941 American drama thriller film directed by Norman Z. McLeod and starring Laraine Day, Robert Young, Tom Conway, Frieda Inescort, John Litel and Marsha Hunt. The screenplay was written by Bayard Veiller based on his 1927 play of the same name. It had previously been made as a 1929 MGM movie starring Norma Shearer in her first all-talking role. There are significant differences in the two movie versions. The 1941 remake was released on February 14, 1941, by Metro-Goldwyn-Mayer.

== Plot ==
Released from a reformatory after two years there for stealing $500, Mary Dugan is advised by a friend there, Agatha Hall, to change her name. Mary decides to go by Mary Andrews and her friend Aggie becomes a showgirl, now called Irene.

Mary's father is hit by a car and killed. The car's owner, wealthy businessman Edgar Wayne, offers her a job. She eventually becomes his private secretary. She also meets the company's attorney, Jimmy Blake, and falls in love. But when Jimmy gets a job in South America, she can't marry him and go along because a birth certificate, required for a passport, would reveal Mary's true identity.

A year later, Jimmy returns because Wayne has been murdered and Mary charged with the crime. He dislikes the way attorney West is handling her case and volunteers to replace him. Wayne's widow testifies that Mary and her husband were having an affair. Jimmy proves that West and the widow schemed to kill her husband, who was leaving her, and make Mary the scapegoat. She is found not guilty.

== Cast ==
- Laraine Day as Mary Dugan
- Robert Young as Jimmy Blake
- Tom Conway as Edgar Wayne
- Frieda Inescort as Mrs. Wayne
- John Litel as Mr. West
- Marsha Hunt as Agatha Hall
- Marjorie Main as Mrs. Collins
- Henry O'Neill as Galway
- Sara Haden as Miss Matthews
- Nora Perry as Sally
- Alma Kruger as Doctor Saunders
- Pierre Watkin as Judge Nash
- Addison Richards as Capt. Price
- Francis Pierlot as John Masters
- Ian Wolfe as Dr. Wriston
- Cliff Clark as John Dugan
- George Watts as Inspector Hunt
- Cliff Danielson as Robert, the Chauffeur
- Kay Sutton as Secretary
- Paul Porcasi as Ship's Captain
- Joe Yule as Sign Painter
- Minerva Urecal as Landlady
- Matt Moore as Bailiff
- Larry Wheat as Court Stenographer
- Milton Kibbee as Court Clerk
- Anna Q. Nilsson as Juror
- Betty Farrington as Spectator
- Joan Barclay as Spectator

== Bibliography ==
- Fetrow, Alan G. Feature Films, 1940-1949: a United States Filmography. McFarland, 1994.
