= Paid (1930 film) =

1930 film

- Directed by: Sam Wood
- Written by: Adaptation: Lucien Hubbard; Adaptation and dialogue: Charles MacArthur
- Based on: "Within the Law" (1912 play) by Bayard Veiller
- Produced by: Sam Wood
- Starring: Joan Crawford; Robert Armstrong; Kent Douglass
- Cinematography: Charles Rosher
- Edited by: Hugh Wynn
- Music by: Yellen & Ager
- Distributed by: Metro-Goldwyn-Mayer
- Release date: December 30, 1930
- Running time: 86 minutes
- Country: United States
- Language: English
- Budget: $385,000
- Box office: $1,231,000

Paid is a 1930 American pre-Code drama film starring Joan Crawford, Robert Armstrong, and Kent Douglass in a story about a wrongly accused ex-convict who seeks revenge on those who sent her to prison using a scam called the "Heart Balm Racket".

The film was adapted by Lucien Hubbard and Charles MacArthur from the play, Within the Law by Bayard Veiller (1912) and was the fourth film version of the play. The film was directed and produced by Sam Wood.

== Plot ==
Paid (1930)

Mary Turner (Crawford), unjustly imprisoned for 3 years, rejoins former inmates to con elderly men into marriage proposals, and sued for breach of promise. Initially seeking vengeance, she ultimately finds redemption and a new path.

== Cast ==
- Joan Crawford as Mary Turner
- Robert Armstrong as Joe Garson
- Marie Prevost as Agnes Lynch
- Kent Douglass as Bob Gilder
- John Miljan as Inspector Burke
- Purnell Pratt as Edward Gilder
- Hale Hamilton as District Attorney Demarest
- Robert Emmett O'Connor as Detective Sergeant Cassidy
- Tyrell Davis as Eddie Griggs
- William Bakewell as B.M. Carney
- George Cooper as Red
- Gwen Lee as Bertha
- Louise Beavers as Black Convict (uncredited)
- Edward Brophy as Burglar (uncredited)
- Payne B. Johnson as Baby (uncredited)
- Fred Kelsey as Night Policeman (uncredited)
- Wilbur Mack as Mr. Irwin (uncredited)
- Tom Mahoney as Policeman at District Attorney's Office (uncredited)
- Polly Moran as Polly
- Lee Phelps as Court Bailiff (uncredited)
- Herbert Prior as General Harrison (uncredited)
- Jed Prouty as Policeman Williams (uncredited)
- Walter Walker as Judge Lawler (uncredited)
- Clarence Wilson as Max Hardy (uncredited)

== Reception ==
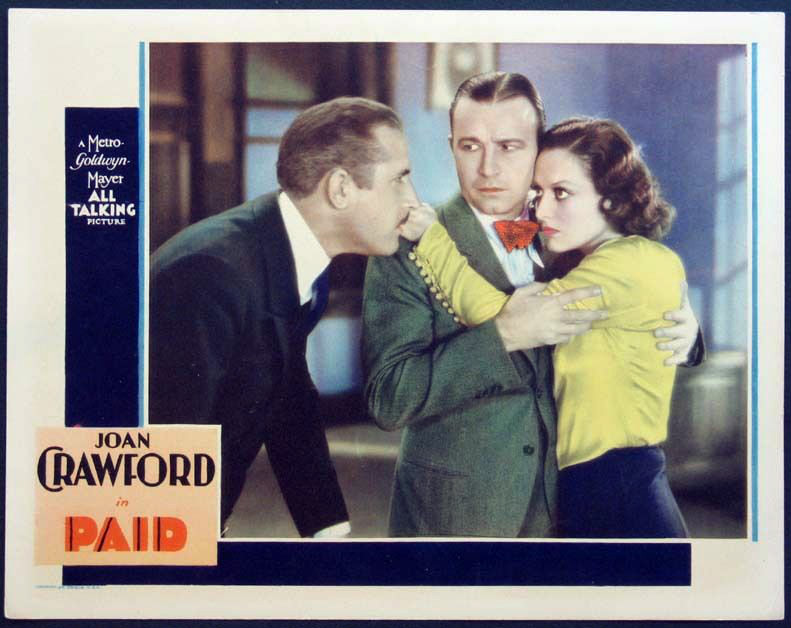
Lobby card

Photoplay commented, "The story is absorbing and Joan is simply grand!" The New York Times noted, "Miss Crawford and Miss Prevost are very good in their roles."

=== Box office ===
According to MGM records the film earned $920,000 in the US and Canada and $311,000 elsewhere resulting in a profit of $415,000.

== Adaptations ==
Paid was remade in Bollywood as the film Intaqam starring Sadhana.
