= Within the Law (play) =

Play by Bayard Veiller

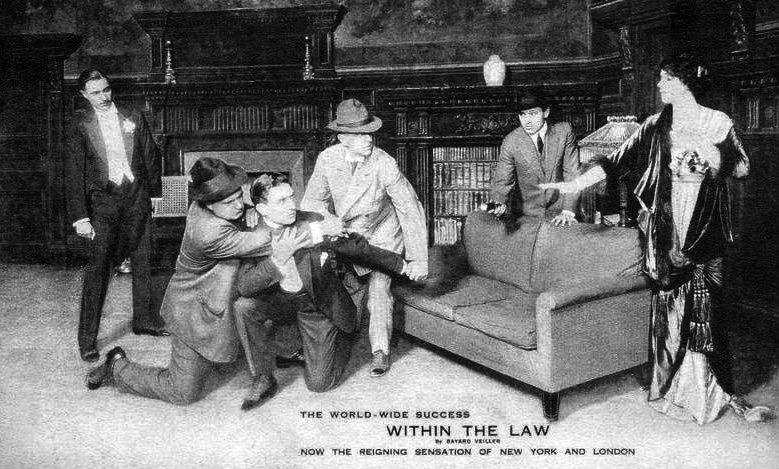
- Advertising postcard for Within the Law
- Original language: English
- Written by: Bayard Veiller
- Genre: Drama

Premiere
- Date: September 11, 1912 (Note: Premier information is for the Broadway production.)
- Place: Eltinge 42nd Street Theatre

Within the Law is a play written by Bayard Veiller. It is the story of Mary Turner, a sales clerk who is wrongly accused of stealing and sent to prison. Upon her release, Turner sets up a gang that engages in shady activities that are just "within the law". After the police try to entrap her, she is mistakenly accused again, this time for murder, but she is vindicated when the real killer confesses.

Veiller used his experience as a crime reporter to develop the play, but he was initially unable to find a producer for it. He finally settled on selling the rights to the play, along with two others he had written, for a fixed fee. After an unsuccessful run in Chicago, it became a huge hit on Broadway in 1912–1913, running for 541 performances. It was subsequently performed by multiple road companies and adapted as a movie five times. Although it was one of the biggest hits of its era, Veiller got relatively little income from it due to his decision to sell it for a lump sum.

== Plot ==
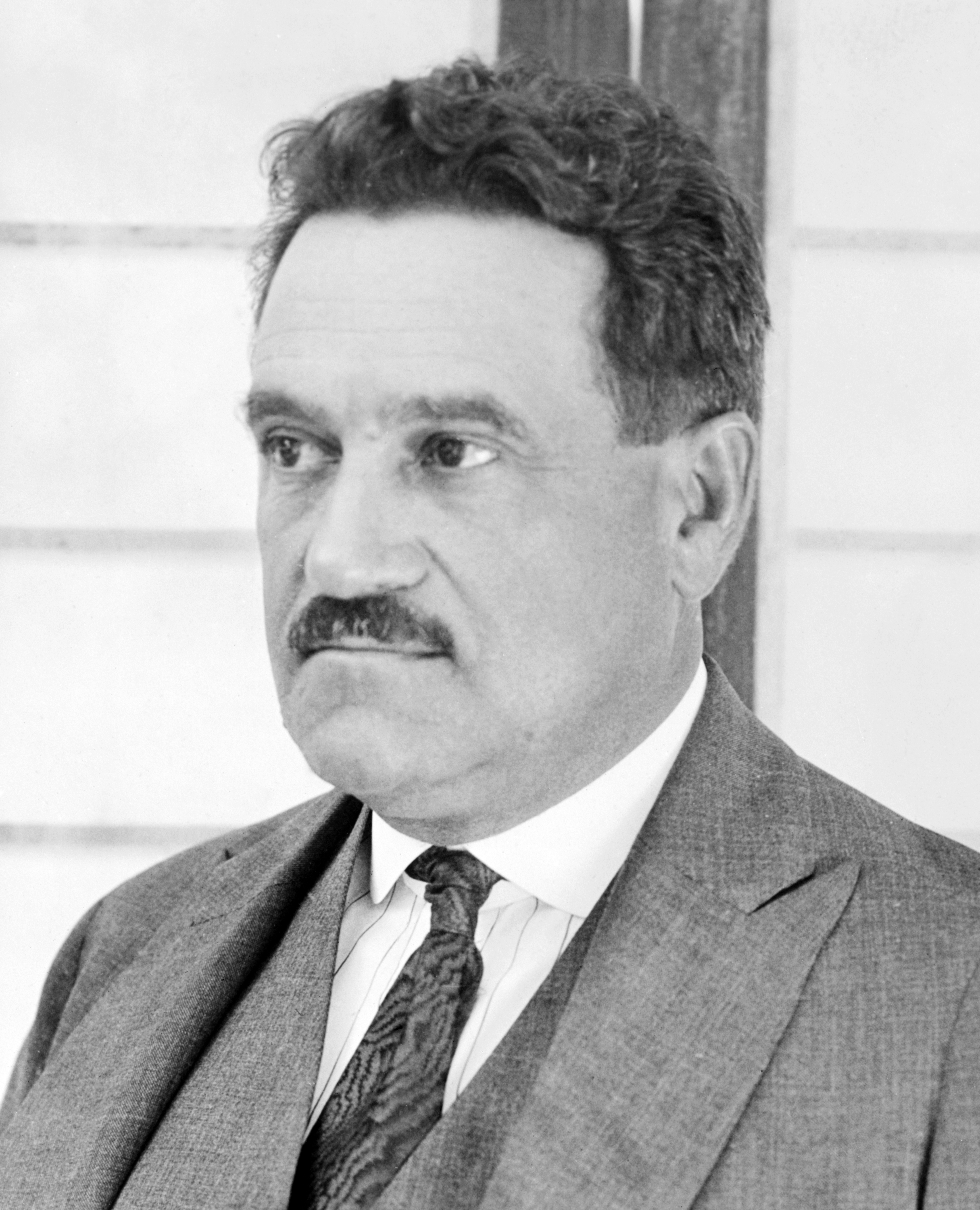
Bayard Veiller wrote the play in 1911.

In the first act, department store owner Edward Gilder learns that one of his former sales clerks, Mary Turner, has been convicted for stealing and given a three-year prison sentence. Gilder is pleased because he had asked the judge to make her an "example" to other employees. Turner asks to speak with Gilder before she goes to prison. While Gilder waits for her arrival, his store detective detains another woman, a customer, for stealing. This woman is the wife of a prominent banker, so rather than have her arrested, Gilder apologizes to her and lets her go. Turner arrives and tells Gilder she has been wrongly convicted. Although she says she never stole, she pleads with Gilder to increase the wages of his clerks, so no one who works there will be forced to steal. Gilder rejects her arguments, and she leaves for prison swearing revenge on him for his treatment of her.

After being released from prison, Turner sets up a gang that engages in shady activities that are just within the boundaries of the law. She also marries Gilder's son. A member of the gang attempts to rob the home of Turner's new father-in-law at the urging of a police stooge attempting to entrap the gang. When the stooge reveals the plot, the gang member kills him, leaving Turner and her new husband at the scene to be found by the police. It seems that Turner may go to prison again, but she is saved when the guilty party confesses that she had no involvement in the crimes. (Note: Plot details are based on the Broadway production. Revisions to the script were made for the Chicago production, which were removed for later productions.)

== History ==
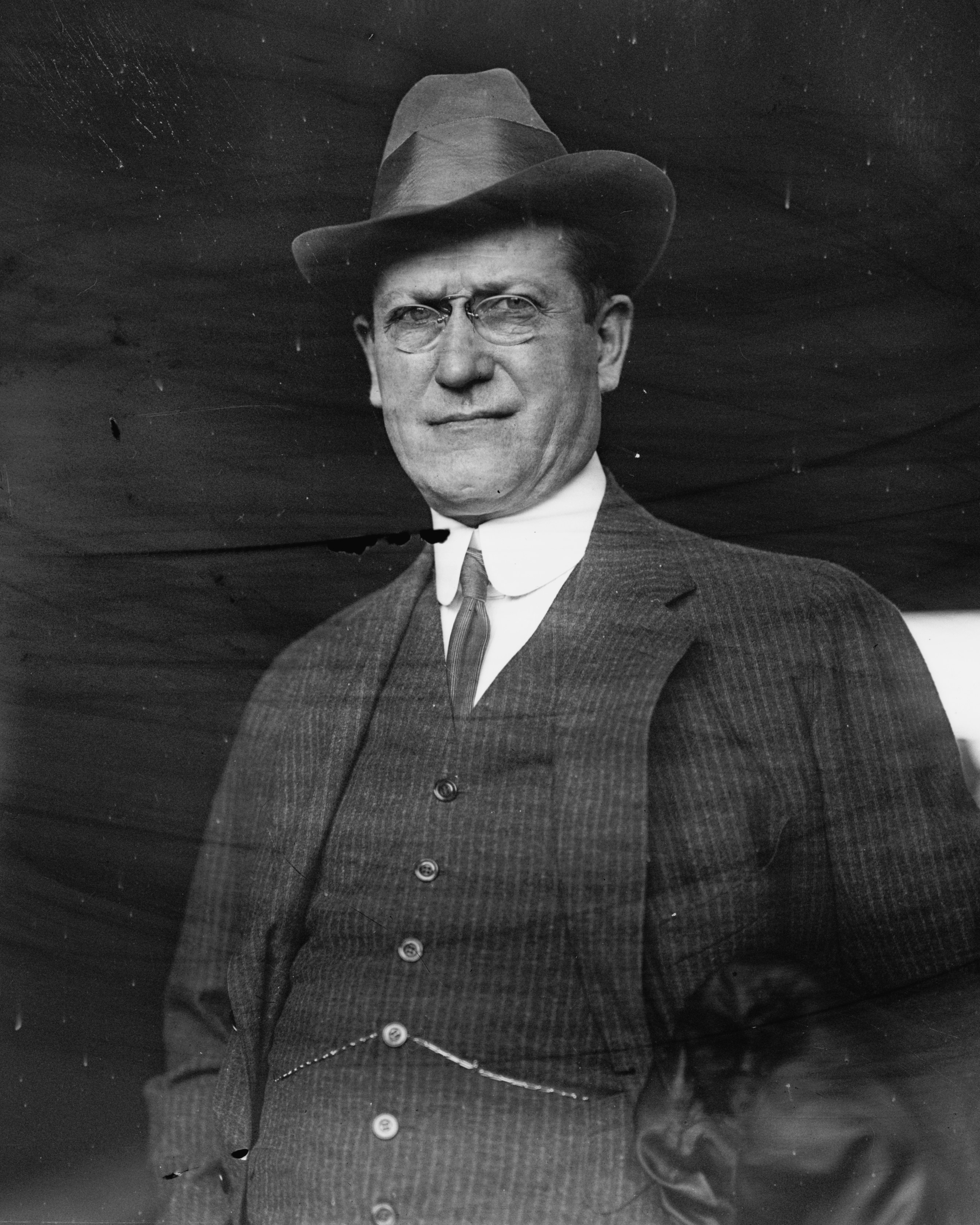
William A. Brady mounted the first production in Chicago.

Veiller began writing the play under the title The Miracle, which he later revised to The Case of Mary Turner and finally to Within the Law. In 1911 he took it to the Selwyn brothers (Archie and Edgar Selwyn), who brokered plays, to find a producer for it. Several prominent producers considered it, including David Belasco, George M. Cohan, Charles Frohman, Sam Harris, and Henry Wilson Savage. It was repeatedly rejected. The production duo of Louis Dreyfus and Herman Fellner took an option on the play, but they ran into financial difficulties and the option lapsed. Seeing few prospects for his work, Veiller offered to sell the rights to Within the Law and two other plays to the Selwyns for a flat fee of $3,750 (about $94,000 in 2025 dollars). (Note: Johnston, Louis; Williamson, Samuel H. (2023). "What Was the U.S. GDP Then?". MeasuringWorth. United States Gross Domestic Product deflator figures follow the MeasuringWorth series.) They were reluctant to accept this offer, fearing that they would be seen as exploiting an author in financial difficulty, but they eventually agreed.

Soon after the Selwyns purchased it, the play attracted the interest of producer William A. Brady. Brady thought the lead role would good for his wife, actress Grace George. She decided not to take the part, but Brady continued with the production anyway. Brady asked writer and theater manager George Broadhurst to make some script revisions. Brady's production opened at the Princess Theatre in Chicago on April 6, 1912. After a few weeks of unsuccessful results, Brady was disillusioned with the play and offered to sell the rights back to the Selwyns. Brady closed the Chicago production on June 22, 1912. The Selwyn brothers bought it back under the auspices of one of their businesses, the American Play Company. They were joined by several partners: Lee Shubert (who already had a share of the play as Brady's partner on the Chicago production), A. H. Woods, and Crosby Gaige. They paid Brady $10,000, which was enough to cover his costs for the Chicago production, but a tiny fraction of what the play would later earn.

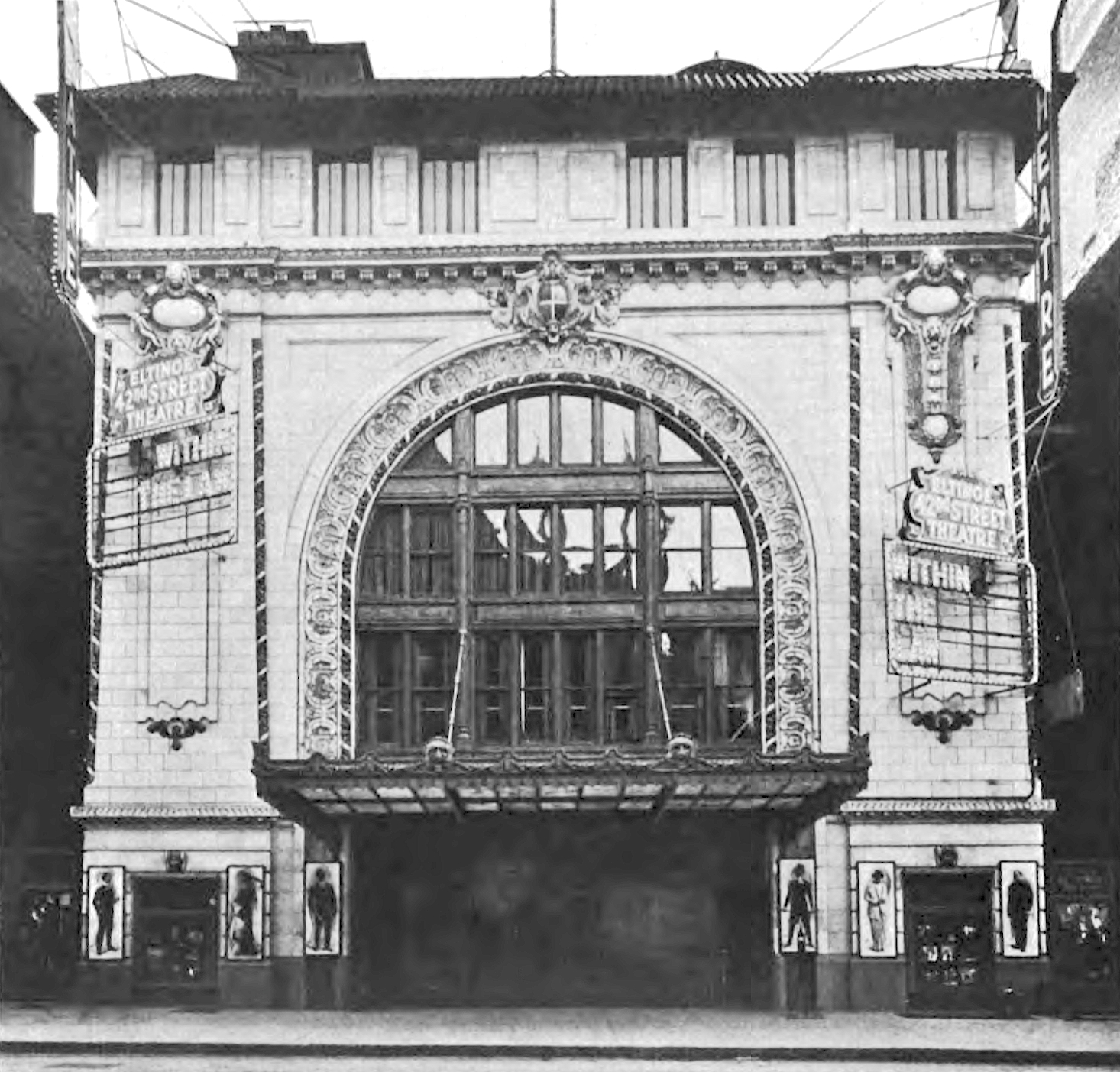
Within the Law was the debut play for the newly built Eltinge Theatre.

Woods brought the play to his newly built Eltinge 42nd Street Theatre in New York, where it was the venue's debut production. The show opened on September 11, 1912. Holbrook Blinn directed the production and used Veiller's original script without the changes made by Broadhurst. It was the biggest hit of the 1912–1913 Broadway season. It ran for 541 performances and did not close until December 1913. After flubbing an important line on opening night, an actress bemoaned to Veiller that she had "ruined" his play. Reflecting on the production's critical and financial success in his autobiography, Veiller wished that more actresses had "ruined" his plays in this way. After the production closed at the Eltinge, multiple road companies were launched. Nine different companies toured North America, while another opened in the United Kingdom.

Because he sold his rights for a fixed fee, Veiller earned no royalties. Since the Selwyns did not want to develop a reputation for taking advantage of authors, they offered him a stipend of $100 per week for the Broadway run and $50 per week for each road company. Within the Law was Veiller's first hit as a playwright.

A Broadway revival was staged in 1928, with Clifford Brook and Mabel Brownell directing. It opened at the Cosmopolitan Theatre on March 5, 1928, and closed after 16 performances.

== Cast and characters ==
The play's protagonist and lead female role is Mary Turner, a shopgirl who becomes a criminal mastermind. Grace George initially accepted the part for the Chicago production, but changed her mind during rehearsals and decided she did not want to play the leader of a criminal gang. Emily Stevens took on the role instead.

For the Broadway production, Jane Cowl was cast as Turner. Cowl specialized in portraying tearful women and considered her skills well-adapted for the role. Helen Ware filled in for Cowl when she took a brief vacation from the production's long run.

Actor William B. Mack appeared in both the Chicago and Broadway productions, both times playing Joe Garson, the gang member responsible for the shooting.

The characters and cast from the Broadway production are given below:

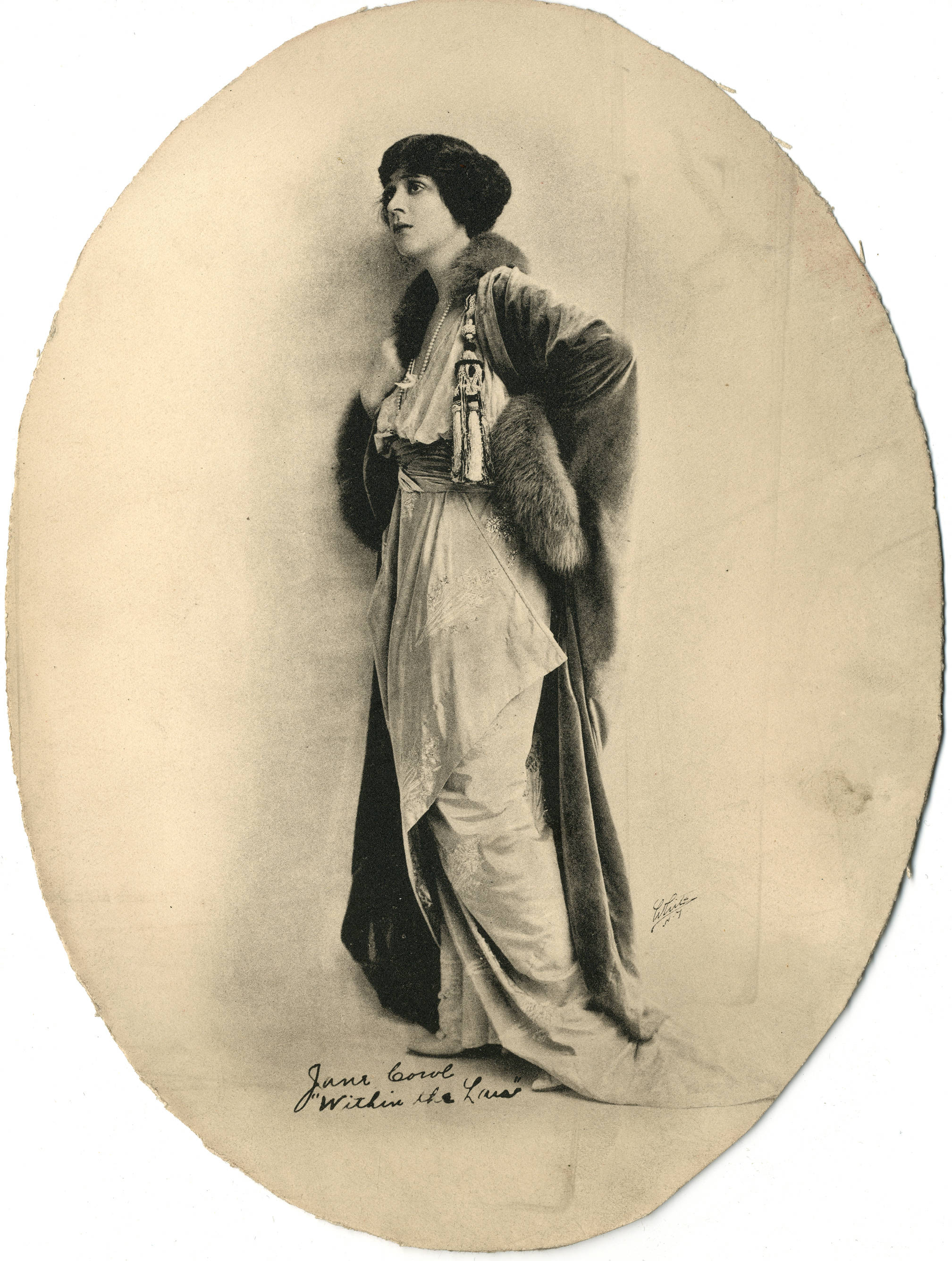
Jane Cowl, Within the Law

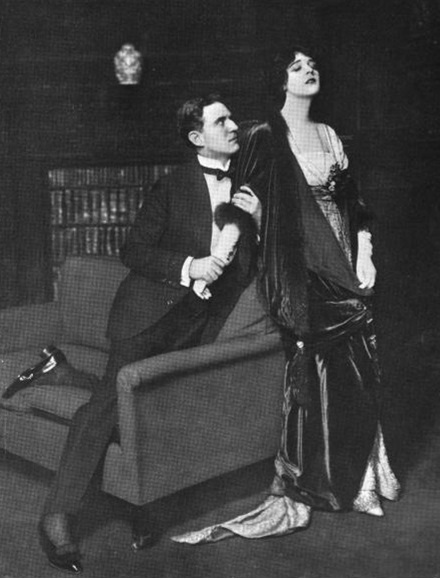
Orme Caldara with Jane Cowl in a scene from the Broadway production

Character	Broadway first run cast	1928 Broadway revival
Tom Tupper	Edward Bolton	
Richard Gilder	Orme Caldara	Charles Ray
Dacey	John Camp	
Mary Turner	Jane Cowl; Helen Ware	Violet Heming
Thomas	Arthur Ebbetts	
Eddie Griggs	Kenneth Hill	Stanley Logan
Dan	Frederick Howe	
George Demarest	Brandon Hurst	
Sarah	Georgia Lawrence	
Joe Garson	William B. Mack	Robert Warwick
Edward Gilder	Dodson Mitchell	
Agnes Lynch	Florence Nash	Claudette Colbert
Williams	Joseph Nickson	
William Irwin	William A. Norton	
"Chicago Red"	Arthur Paulding	
Smithson	S. V. Phillips	
Inspector Burke	Wilton Taylor	Frank Shannon
Helen Morris	Catherine Tower	Peggy Allenby
Fannie	Martha White	
Detective Sergeant Cassidy	John Willard	

== Reception ==
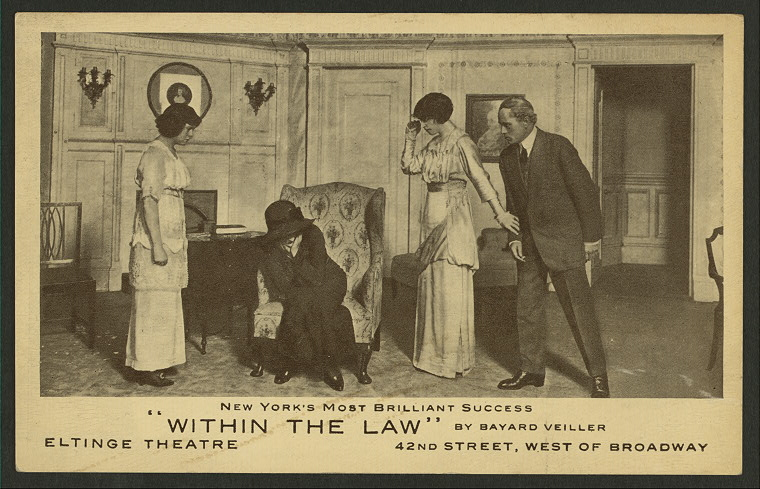
An advertisement for the play at the Eltinge Theatre promoted it as a "brilliant success".

=== Reviews ===
The Broadway production received positive reviews. The reviewer for The New York Times called it "an exciting entertainment of the most vivid kind", praising the writing and the performances. A review in Brooklyn Life called the story "extremely interesting and well told" and said there was "not a weak spot in the cast". In Everybody's Magazine, drama critic Clayton Hamilton called it "a genuine achievement" that was "tightly constructed, tersely written, and admirably acted".

=== Box office ===
Although it received positive reviews, the Chicago production was not a commercial success.

The New York Times review of the Broadway production predicted that the play was "sure of being extremely successful". This prediction was accurate, as the show became a huge hit. The opening night had multiple curtain calls, and by the second night the theater was so packed that Veiller could not enter to watch the performance. In 1914, Walter Reynolds called it "the greatest success of any modern melodrama produced in the metropolis", and in 1915, theater journalist Rennold Wolf said it was possibly "the most profitable play of our generation". By 1917, productions in the United States had taken in revenues of about $2.44 million ($40.3 million in 2025 dollars).

== Adaptations ==
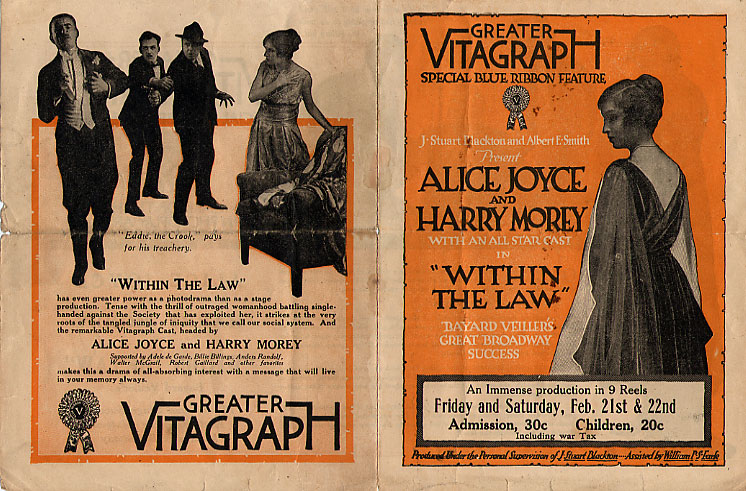
An advertising circular for the 1917 movie adaptation starring Alice Joyce

=== Movies ===
The play was adapted as a movie five different times from 1916 to 1939. In 1916, the Australian production company J. C. Williamson Ltd became the first to adapt the play, which they had previously produced for the stage in several Australian cities. The stage productions included several actors who had performed the play in the United States, such as Canadian actress Muriel Starr as Turner. Starr kept role for the film, which also kept Within the Law as its title. Director Monte Luke filmed mostly on the stage of the Theatre Royal in Melbourne.

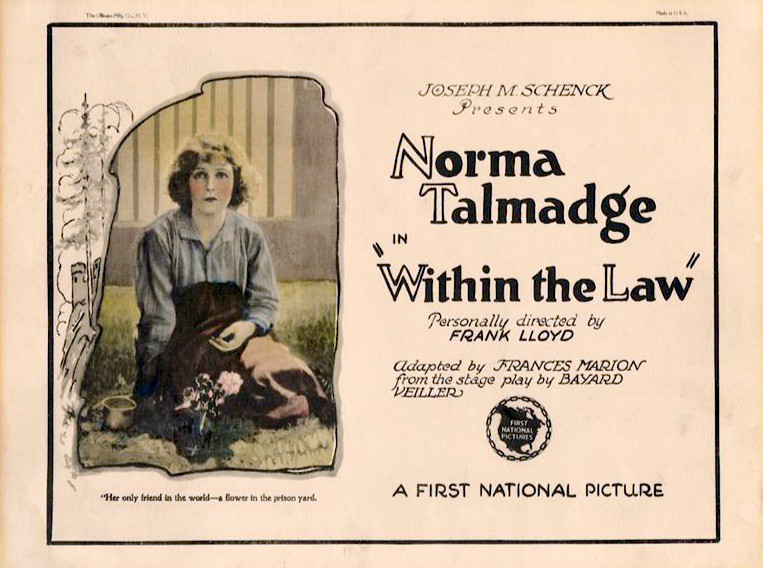
Lobby card for the 1923 adaptation starring Norma Talmadge

The first American adaptation came the following year, also under the title Within the Law. William P. S. Earle directed the silent film for the Vitagraph Company of America. Alice Joyce played Turner. The last of the silent film adaptations, again titled Within the Law, came in 1923. Popular star Norma Talmadge produced and played Turner; Frank Lloyd directed.

In 1930, the first sound film adaptation used the title Paid. Sam Wood directed the Metro-Goldwyn-Mayer (MGM) production. MGM star Joan Crawford played Turner. MGM also produced the final adaptation of the play in 1939. Within the Law was restored as the title. Czech filmmaker Gustav Machatý directed, with Ruth Hussey starring as Turner.

=== Other adaptations ===
In 1913, H.K. Fly published a novelization of the play, written by Marvin Dana.

The play was adapted for television as an episode of Broadway Television Theatre that aired on June 2, 1952.
