= The Trial of Mary Dugan (play) =

1927 play by Bayard Veiler

The Trial of Mary Dugan is a play written by Bayard Veiller.

The 1927 melodrama concerns a sensational courtroom trial of a showgirl accused of killing her millionaire lover. Her defense attorney is her brother, Jimmy Dugan. It was first presented on Broadway in 1927, with Ann Harding in the title role, and in London in 1928 with Genevieve Tobin. Two American films were based on the play, one in 1929 directed by Bayard Veiller and starring Norma Shearer, and one in 1941 directed by Norman Z. McLeod and starring Laraine Day. The play was performed at the Savoy Theatre, Strand, London, during 1958. Presented by Peter Saunders, it featured Betsy Blair, David Knight, Cec Linder and Patricia Burke.

During the action, the audience was addressed as if it were the jury.

The Broadway production premiered at the National Theatre on September 19, 1927, moved to the Sam H. Harris Theatre on June 11, 1928, and then to the Century Theatre from September 3–19, 1928, for a total of 437 performances.

A novelization of the play, by William Almon Wolff, was published in 1929.

Ayn Rand’s Night of January 16th is reported to have been modeled on this play.

== Adaptations ==
In 1929, the play was adapted into a film of the same name. In 1931, three separate films were produced for French-, German- and Spanish-speaking territories.

In 1941, the play was adapted into a second English-language film.

== See also ==
- Dugan
