= The Thirteenth Chair (1929 film) =

1929 film

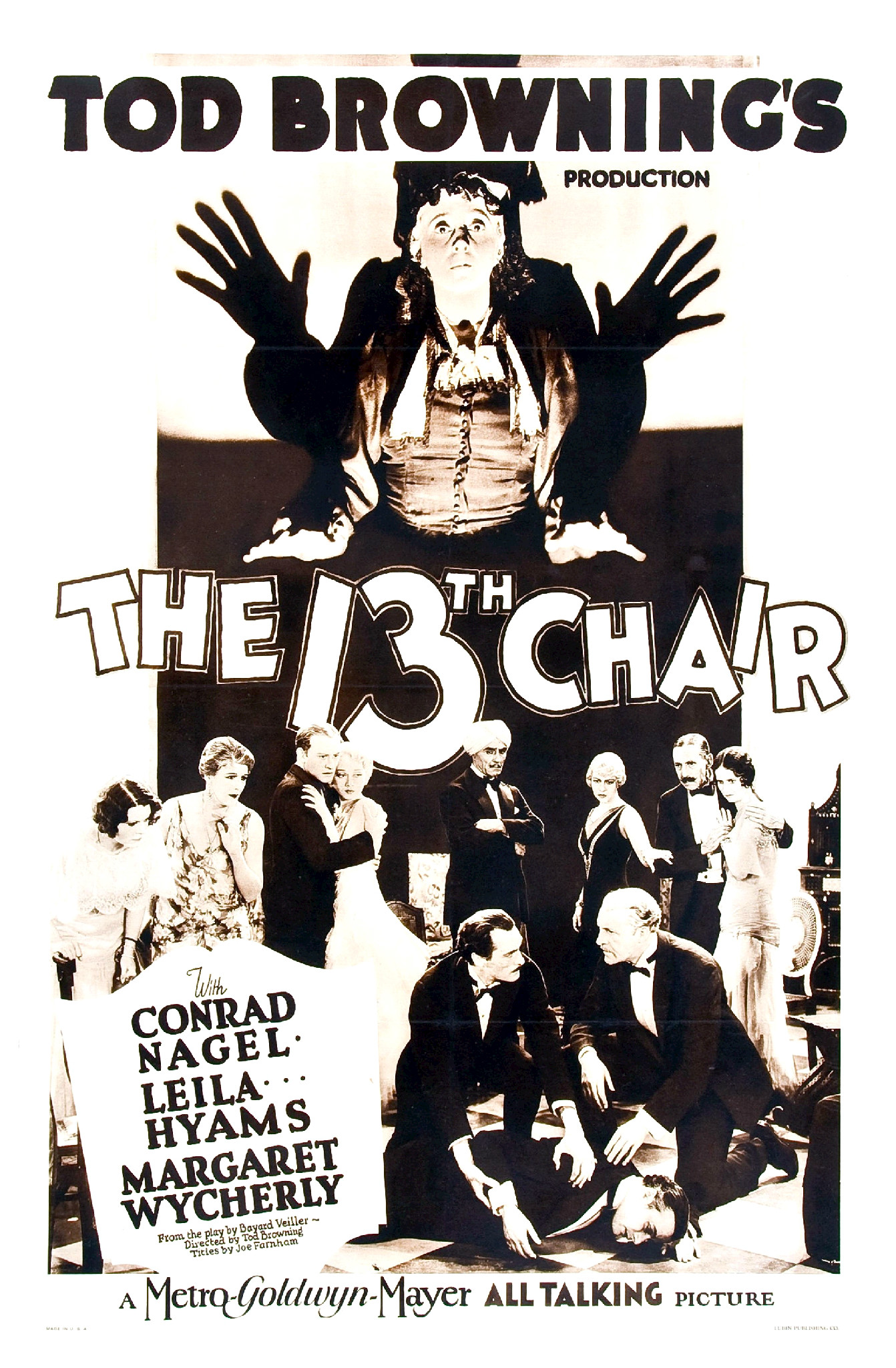
- Theatrical release poster
- Directed by: Tod Browning
- Screenplay by: Elliott J. Clawson
- Based on: The Thirteenth Chair; 1916 play by Bayard Veiller
- Starring: Conrad Nagel; Leila Hyams; Margaret Wycherly
- Cinematography: Merritt Gerstad
- Edited by: Harry Reynolds
- Production company: Metro-Goldwyn-Mayer Corp.
- Release date: 19 October 1929
- Running time: 72 minutes
- Country: United States
- Language: English

The Thirteenth Chair is a 1929 American mystery film directed by Tod Browning. The picture is based on a 1916 play of the same name by Bayard Veiller. It stars Conrad Nagel, Leila Hyams, and Margaret Wycherly.

The film was one of many released in both sound and silent versions. The initial television airing of the sound version, minus commercials, was by TCM on August 22, 2019. The sound version aired previously, with commercials, in the early 1990s on TNT.

An earlier version of the film, starring Creighton Hale, was made in 1919 by ACME/ Pathe Exchange, directed by Leonce Perret. In 1937, the film was again remade by MGM under the same title starring Elissa Landi and Dame May Whitty.

== Plot ==
The Thirteenth Chair (1929)

Inspector Delzante, investigates a pair of murders near a British mansion in Calcutta. Helen O'Neill becomes a chief suspect based on circumstantial evidence. A fake Irish medium, Madame LaGrange, is called in to try to help solve the first murder.

== Cast ==
- Conrad Nagel as Richard Crosby
- Leila Hyams as Helen "Nellie" O'Neill
- Margaret Wycherly as "Madame" Rosalie La Grange
- Helene Millard as Mary Eastwood
- Holmes Herbert as Sir Roscoe Crosby
- Mary Forbes as Lady Alice Crosby
- Bela Lugosi as Inspector Delzante
- John Davidson as Edward "Ned" Wales
- Charles Quatermaine as Dr. Philip Mason (credited as Charles Quartermaine)
- Moon Carroll as Helen Trent
- Cyril Chadwick as Brandon Trent
- Frank Leigh as Professor Feringeea
- Clarence Geldart as Commissioner Grimshaw (credited as Clarence Geldert)

== Production ==
The Thirteenth Chair was director Tod Browning's first sound film. It was based on one of the most famous of the "old dark house" stage plays: Bayard Veiller's The Thirteenth Chair which debuted on Broadway on November 20, 1916. The play had previously been adapted as a silent film by Léonce Peret as The Thirteenth Chair

In late May, 1929, MGM hired Margaret Wycherly to reprise her stage role as La Grange. Shortly after, Leila Hyams was also cast. For the leading role of Richard Crosby, the press has stated that Lon Chaney was offered the role but turned it down. The Hollywood Filmograph stated later that Joel McCrea would play Crosby, but Conrad Nagel replaced him before production began. Bela Lugosi took a break from performing the play Dracula from June 23 to July 21 to appear in Tod Browning's The Thirteenth Chair as the film's inspector. Lugosi had replaced William "Stage" Boyd, which led to the character's name being changed to Inspector Dezlante, to suit Lugosi's accent.

The script labelled as the "First Temporary Incomplete" script dated May 8, 1929, by Elliott Clawson changed the play's setting from New York to Calcutta, India. The film otherwise largely follows the story of the screenplay, but changes the identity of the actual murderer. The film was set to start production on June 3, 1929, but only started on June 10. Rehearsals and shooting time totalled 36 days, with principal photography being completed on July 15, 1929. The Hollywood Filmograph reported Browing being in post-production and near completion of the film on August 10.

== Release ==
The Thirteenth Chair was released on October 19, 1929. Shortly after this release, a silent version of the film was released. This was a regular occurrence during this period in film history as several film theatres were not equipped to show sound film. The silent version of the film is considered lost as of February 2021.

== Reception ==
Historians Gary Rhodes and Bill Kaffenberger stated that contemporary response to the film was varied. The Hollywood Filmograph stated that several scenes depended strictly on sound, "to which the audience did not react favorably."

Among the positive reviews, The Education Screen stated the film was "tense and gripping murder mystery, skillfully picturized, well acted" and was "above average". Billboard declared it "rattling good entertainment" with Tod Browning "giving his better efforts, and leaves the picturegoer completely satisfied" A review in Variety found the ending weak, but stated the film should satisfy audiences.

Motion Picture News stated the film had "nothing outstanding to recommend it beyond capable direction of Tod Browning" Weekly Film Review declared that it "just misses being good entertainment" Harrison's Reports was blunt in its assessment: "Mediocre! The story is thin, the action is slow and the slightly interwoven romance is not interesting." It found the seance scenes and the disclosure of the real murderer to be the only good parts.

== See also ==
- Bela Lugosi filmography
- List of early sound feature films (1926–1929)

== Bibliography ==
- Rhodes, Gary D.; Kaffenberger, William M. (2021). Becoming Dracula: The Early Years of Bela Lugosi. Vol. 2 (Kindle ed.). BearManor Media. ISBN 978-1-62933-811-8.
