= The Trial of Mary Dugan (1929 film) =

1929 film

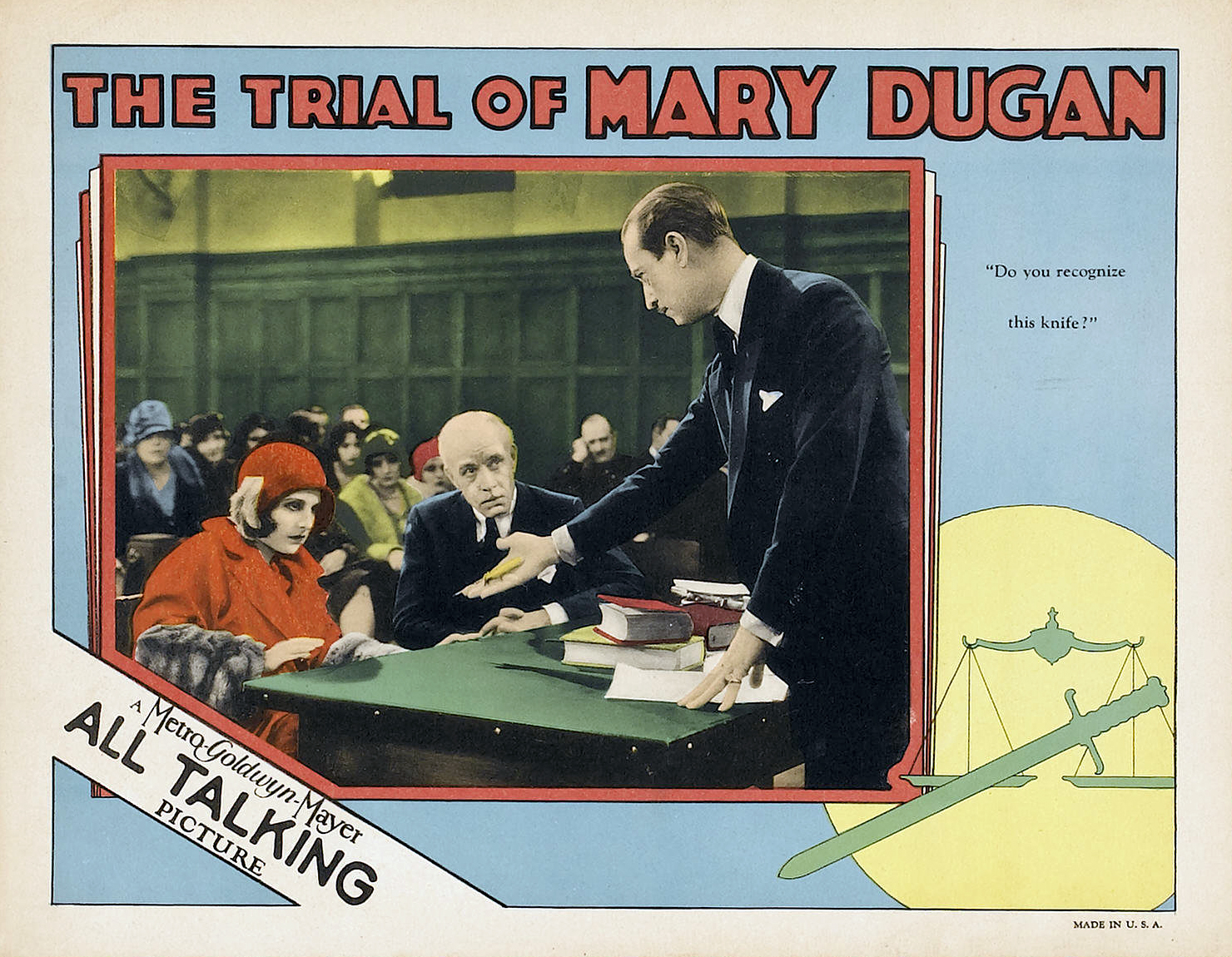
- Lobby card
- Directed by: Bayard Veiller
- Written by: Bayard Veiller (play); Becky Gardiner (screenplay)
- Based on: The Trial of Mary Dugan; 1927 play by Bayard Veiller
- Produced by: Louis B. Mayer
- Starring: Norma Shearer
- Cinematography: William H. Daniels
- Edited by: Blanche Sewell
- Distributed by: Metro-Goldwyn-Mayer
- Release date: June 8, 1929 (U.S)
- Running time: 113 minutes
- Country: United States
- Language: English

The Trial of Mary Dugan is a 1929 American pre-Code film produced and distributed by Metro-Goldwyn-Mayer and starring Norma Shearer. The film is based on the 1927 Broadway stage play The Trial of Mary Dugan by Bayard Veiller, who also directed the film. On stage the play had starred Ann Harding (in Shearer's role), who would come to Hollywood a few years later at the beginning of talkies. This was Veiller's only sound film directorial effort; he had directed several silent films before 1922. The play was also published as a novel authored by William Almon Wolff, published in 1928. The 1941 film of the same name is an MGM remake.

== Plot ==
The Trial of Mary Dugan (1929)

Mary Dugan, a Broadway showgirl, is charged with murder in the knifing death of her wealthy lover and goes on trial for her life. When her defense counsel appears to bungle his job, Mary's brother Jimmy, a newly licensed attorney, jumps into the case to defend his sister. Jimmy's courtroom style is unconventional, but he seems to be holding his own against the prosecuting attorney... until a surprise testimony changes the course of the trial.

== Cast ==
- Norma Shearer as Mary Dugan
- Lewis Stone as Edward West
- H. B. Warner as District Attorney Galway
- Raymond Hackett as Jimmy Dugan
- Lilyan Tashman as Dagmar Lorne
- Olive Tell as Mrs. Gertrude Rice
- Adrienne D'Ambricourt as Marie Ducrot
- DeWitt Jennings as Inspector Hunt
- Wilfrid North as Judge Nash
- Landers Stevens as Dr. Welcome
- Mary Doran as Pauline Agguerro
- Westcott Clarke as Captain Price
- Charles R. Moore as James Madison
- Claud Allister as Henry James Plaisted
- Myra Hampton as May Harris

Cast notes:

- Thomas A. Curran, an early American silent film actor, had an uncredited bit part.

== Censorship ==
When The Trial of Mary Dugan was released in the United States, many states and cities in the United States had censor boards that could require cuts or other eliminations before the film could be shown. In Pennsylvania, the film had silent sections where the dialog had been cut, and for longer deletions a photostatic copy of a newspaper providing news of the trial was added. At the Penn Theater in Pittsburgh, a trailer was shown before the film with the following statement:

The management wishes to beg the indulgence of the audience for what may seem to be mechanical defects in the feature picture about to be shown. They are not defects but cuts in dialog ordered by the Pennsylvania Board of Censors.

The Chicago Board of Censors did not order any cuts but initially passed the film on a "pink" or "adults only" basis for showing at the Roosevelt Theatre. However, after the showing of the film had been advertised, the board changed its mind and without comment banned the film. The theater instead showed Careers (1929), which had been passed in Chicago as "adults only."

== See also ==
- List of early sound feature films (1926–1929)
