= Bayard Veiller =

American screenwriter

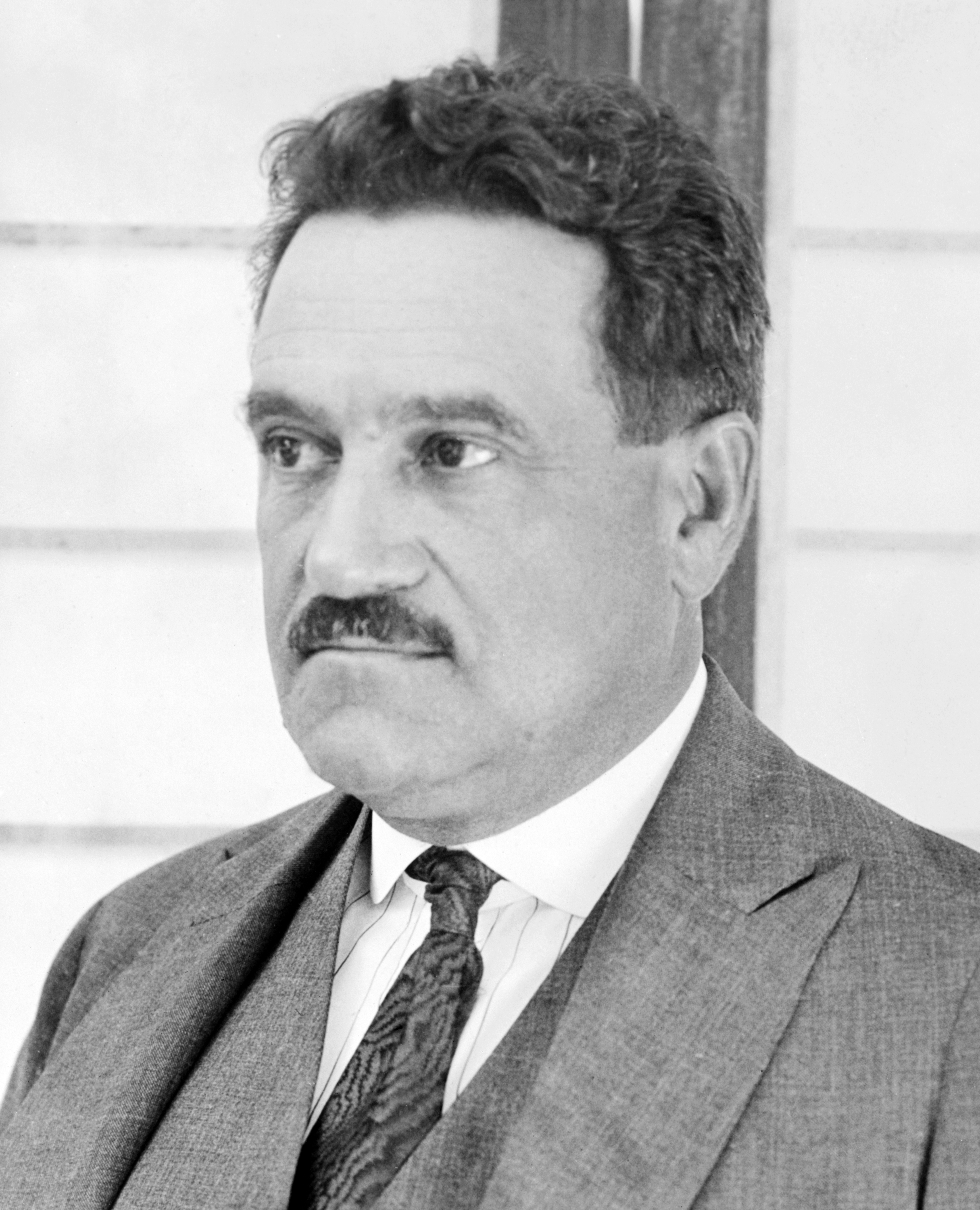
- Veiller in 1920
- Born: January 2, 1869; Brooklyn, New York, U.S.
- Died: January 16, 1943 (aged 74); New York City, U.S.
- Occupation: Writer
- Years active: 1915–1943
- Spouse: Margaret Wycherly (m. 1901; div. 1922)
- Children: Anthony Veiller

Bayard Veiller (January 2, 1869 – January 16, 1943) was an American playwright, screenwriter, producer and film director. He wrote for 32 films between 1915 and 1941.

== Biography ==
He was born on January 2, 1869, in Brooklyn, New York to Philip Bayard Veiller. He was married to English actress Margaret Wycherly from 1901 to 1922; their son, Anthony Veiller, was also a screenwriter.

Veiller first broke into Broadway theatre with The Primrose Path (1907), a play that he wrote and produced. It was a failure and left him broke, although it later served as the basis for the 1920 film, Burnt Wings. His first success as a playwright was Within the Law, a hit on Broadway in 1912–1913. It was later adapted as a movie five times. Veiller continued to write plays as he began screenwriting. His later Broadway hits included The Thirteenth Chair and The Trial of Mary Dugan, which were adapted as films. The play The Thirteenth Chair had been licensed for production in Britain in 1917.

Veiller wrote an autobiography, The Fun I've Had, published in 1941 by Reynal and Hitchcock. He died on January 16, 1943, in New York City at age 74.

Caricature of Bayard Veiller by Bert Levy

== Selected filmography ==
- The Deadlier Sex (1920)
- Alias Ladyfingers (1921)
- The Lure of Youth (1921)
- There Are No Villains (1921)
- The Last Card (1922)
- The Face Between (1922)
- The Right That Failed (1922)
- Sherlock Brown (1922)
- Smooth as Satin (1925)
- The Trial of Mary Dugan (1929)
- The Thirteenth Chair (1929)
- Paid (1930)
- The Eagle and the Hawk (1933) producer
- Miss Fane's Baby Is Stolen (1934)
- Menace (1934)
- The Notorious Sophie Lang (1934) producer
- The Trial of Mary Dugan (1941)
