= When Knights Were Bold =

When Knights Were Bold may refer to:

== Film ==
- When Knights Were Bold (1916 British film), a 1916 British comedy film
- When Knights Were Bold (1916 Italian film), a 1916 Italian comedy film
- When Knights Were Bold (1929 film), a 1929 British adventure film
- When Knights Were Bold (1936 film), a 1936 British comedy film

== Literature ==
- When Knighthood Was in Flower (novel), an 1898 American novel sometimes referred to by this title
- When Knights Were Bold (play), a 1906 play by Harriett Jay
- When Knights Were Bold: An Incident of King Arthur's Court, a 1906 play by Marjorie Benton Cooke
- When Knights Were Bold, a 1911 book by Eva March Tappan

== See also ==
- When Knights Were Cold, a 1923 American comedy film
