= When Knights Were Bold (1908 film) =

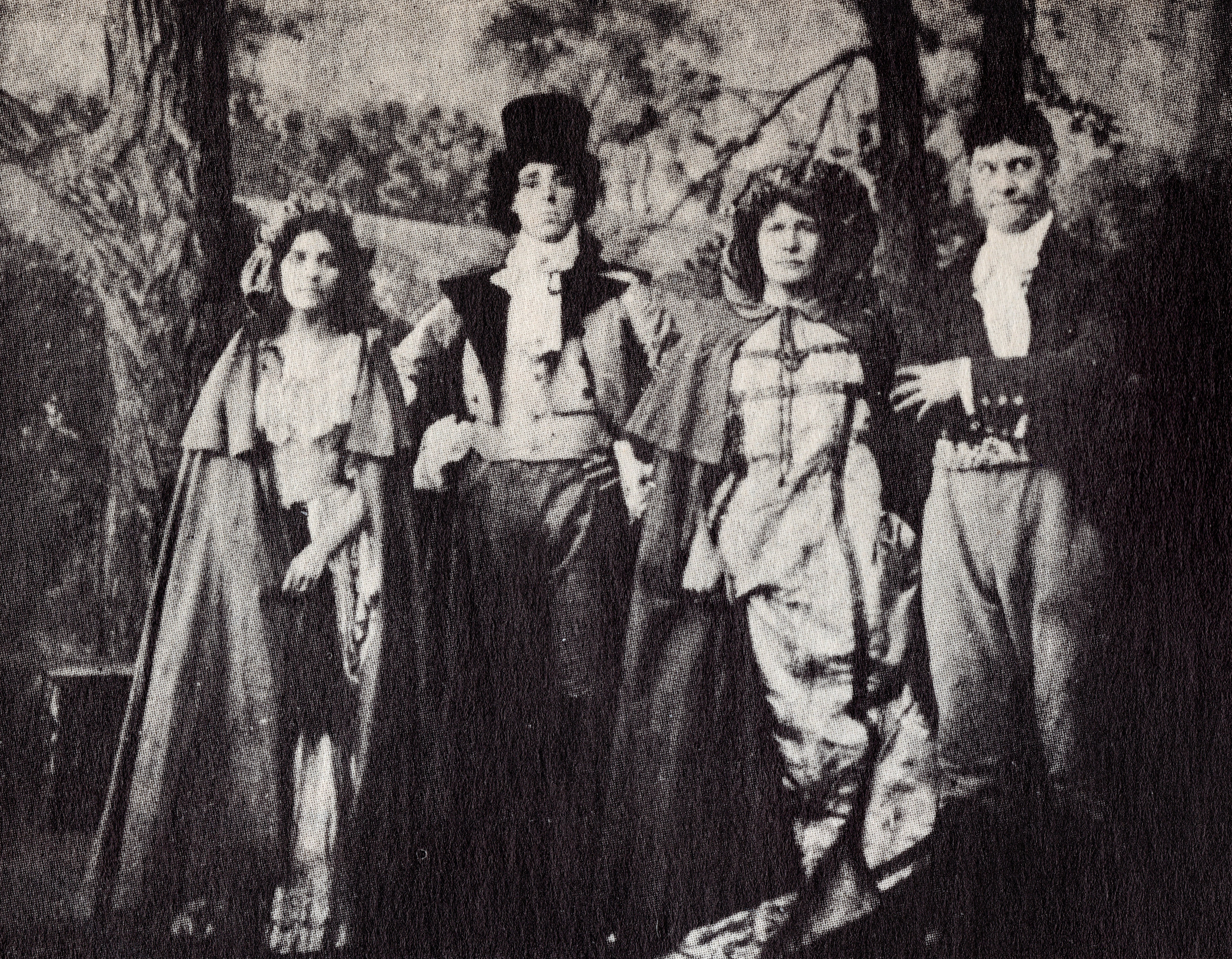
- l to r: Linda Arvidson, D. W. Griffith, May Robson(usually listed as unknown) and Harry Solter.
- Directed by: Wallace McCutcheon
- Written by: Harriett Jay (writing as Charles Marlowe)(play)
- Produced by: American Mutoscope and Biograph Company
- Starring: D. W. Griffith; Linda Arvidson; Harry Solter
- Cinematography: G. W. Bitzer
- Distributed by: Biograph Company
- Release date: May 20, 1908
- Running time: 1 reel
- Country: USA
- Languages: Silent; English titles

When Knights Were Bold is a 1908 silent film short directed by Wallace McCutcheon and produced by the Biograph Company. It is based on a very successful 1906 Broadway play of the same name (over 500 performances by 1908) written by Harriett Jay(under the alias Charles Marlowe) and starred a young Pauline Frederick, George Irving and veteran comic Francis Wilson. The film survives today and is noteworthy for the appearance of D. W. Griffith in an acting role before he started directing for Biograph.

== Cast ==
- Linda Arvidson
- D. W. Griffith
- Harry Solter - Nobleman

unknown and/or uncredited

- Eddie Dillon
- May Robson
