= Edmund Hunter (fabric designer) =

Edmund Hunter (1866-1937) was a British arts and crafts fabric designer. His designs reflected his interest in esoterica, and Celtic and Christian symbolism. He and his wife Dorothea notably were collaborators of W. B. Yeats and his Celtic Mystical Order and were both members of the Hermetic Order of the Golden Dawn. They were part of a social circle that included Florence Farr, Annie Besant, Helena Blavatsky, and Aleister Crowley. Much of his work was produced by St. Edmundsbury Weavers, Hertfordshire.

His works are held by the collections of, amongst others, the British Royal Family, the Victoria and Albert Museum and The Whitworth.
