= Gwendolen Bishop =

British actress (1874–1926)

Gwendolen Bishop (1874–1926) was best known as an actress in the avant-garde theatre in the early years of the 20th century. Later, in 1910, she married Clifford Bax, the playwright, and also used the name Daphne Bax in publications and correspondence. She was a restless woman and had an eclectic career, including as a theatre director, traveller, campaigner and poet. She had a wide circle of friends and associates, including CR Ashbee, WB Yeats, GB Shaw, Thomas Sturge Moore, Florence Farr, Havelock Ellis, Ezra Pound and HD (Hilda Doolittle). Her principal importance lies in her promotion of avant-garde theatre.

== Early life ==
She was born Gwendolen Bernhard Smith in 1874 in Knightsbridge, the sixth of seven children. Her father was a barrister and collector of weapons, but he died when she was six years old.

In 1896, she married Gerald Michael Bishop (1887–1962) at the parish church in Wimbledon. Gerald Bishop was the director of a photographic dealership based in Soho Square (Marion & Co). He was an early socialist, a member of the Fabian Society, and one of his interests was The Guild of Handicraft. This was a utopian worker’s cooperative set up by C. R. Ashbee, first in Whitehall and, after a relocation, in Chipping Camden in the Cotswolds.

Bishop became involved in the Healthy and Artistic Dress Union, a society, formed in 1890, with the aim of ‘teaching both men and women how to discriminate by choosing and rejecting, and so gradually moulding the exigencies of our climate and situation, the claims of artistic arrangement of drapery, and harmony of colour’. In 1901, Bishop was the Hon Sec of the Union, when it held an exhibition of living pictures and two promotional meetings in London and Birmingham.

Through the Union and The Guild of Handicraft, Bishop became friendly with Janet Ashbee (the wife of CR). They became very close, appearing in a pageant together; dining with their husbands at the Bishops’ flat; and swimming together in the Thames near Oxford during the summer. Ashbee described Bishop’s appearance:

“On her, even Jaeger seemed right, she had a slender and shapely body, she walked like a willow-tree in motion, and yet she had something Eastern, almost feline in her grace… “

The close relationship between the two women came to an end in 1904 when Gwendolen went to Italy for eight months, without her husband. Gerald Bishop and Janet Ashbee began a loving relationship, said to be unconsummated. For Janet, this led to a mental breakdown but ultimately her reconciliation with CR Ashbee.

Gerald and Gwendolen Bishop were divorced in 1909 on the grounds of his adultery and his desertion of her for two years without reasonable excuse.

== Theatrical career ==
Through her association with the Guild of Handicraft, Bishop became interested in performing, first in 1899 in a masque, Beauties Awakening, depicting cities. She then took acting (or chanting) lessons from Thomas Sturge Moore, the poet, dramatist and friend of W.B. Yeats. Her first stage part was in 1902 as Mary in Laurence Housman’s Bethlehem. She then went on her Italian trip, returning with a desire to be involved in theatre.

By 1905, she was a founder and principal driver of the New Stage Club. She was one of the organisers of the first performance in England of Oscar Wilde’s Salome, negotiating the contract; designing the jewellery; choreographing the dance; and appearing in two roles. This was followed in November 1905 with Henrik Ibsen's Love's Comedy, its first staging in England. The company was characterised as one “which holds advanced views in the domain of dramatic art.” She appeared in GB Shaw’s first stage play, The Philanderer (1905). Her importance and influence has been summed up: “we have to observe that Bishop, as an organizer of the company, had made something that was new in more than name. Over a brief four-year period, she helped to pioneer a polemically innovative, and often shocking, repertoire from which the English theatre did not recover.”

Bishop continued this influence through her association with Sturge Moore and his Literary Theatre Society, supporting him organizationally alongside Florence Farr, a more established actress and director. She appeared in a series of productions, including Strindberg’s Simoon and two productions of Greek Theatre, the Hippolytus of Euripides and Thomas Sturge Moore's Aphrodite against Artemis, with Farr as Phaedra and Bishop as Aphrodite. Bishop's performance far outshone Farr’s, according to Shaw. She remained actively involved in theatre work until 1908, when she travelled to Bagdad.

On her return in 1910, she founded the People’s Free Theatre for Poetic Drama with the objective of “proving the appreciation of fine poetic drama by the “masses” to draw attention to the need of a state-supported theatre which would serve as a valuable instrument for instilling high moral principles into the public mind” as in ancient Greece. She put these principles into practice from 1910 to 1914 staging performances in Whitechapel of Euripides’s Electra and the same dramatist's Hippolytus, in which she played the goddess Artemis.

== Later life ==
During her theatrical career, Bishop again found time to travel. In 1908 she went on a sea voyage with her brother and sister-in-law to Bagdad, then travelled as a lone woman by mule to Aleppo. She produced a book of poetry, based on this experience: From Gardens in the Wilderness. In Aleppo, she met Edith Ellis, the wife of Havelock Ellis, becoming a close friend of both.

On her return, she met Clifford Bax, probably through the Theosophical Society. They were married in Venice in 1910 and had a daughter Undine in 1911. She was 12 years older than him and acted both as a muse and mentor. She introduced Bax to theatre and produced and appeared in his first play, The Poetasters of Ispahan. She considered that she had contributed greatly to his development, but he did not acknowledge this, either at the time or in his later writing. This was later the cause of considerable bitterness on her part.

The family briefly lived in Hampshire at Broughton Gifford in Wiltshire, but they split up due to Clifford Bax’s frequent affairs, including with her friends. In 1914, Gwendolen moved with Undine to Speen in Buckinghamshire. At the outbreak of war, she trained as a munitions worker, writing and publishing a book of poetry about this experience: The Thought-Rhythms of a “Munitioneer”.

She remained in Speen, becoming a focus of village life, staging concerts; founding the Women’s Institute; and campaigning for the Liberal party in the 1922 and 1923 elections, but mostly concentrating on Undine’s development. She maintained contact with her old friends providing financial support to Havelock Ellis and finding a peaceful cottage for Edith and him to stay in Speen in 1916 and 1917 when she was in the last stages of her life. In a similar fashion, she assisted another old friend, Hilda Doolittle (HD) finding a cottage in Speen as a retreat during her pregnancy.

In 1924, she moved to Steep in Hampshire to be near Undine who was attending Bedales School. She died there of cancer early in 1926.
