= Vienna Café =

Coffeehouse in London, England

Coordinates: 51.5173°N 0.1246°W

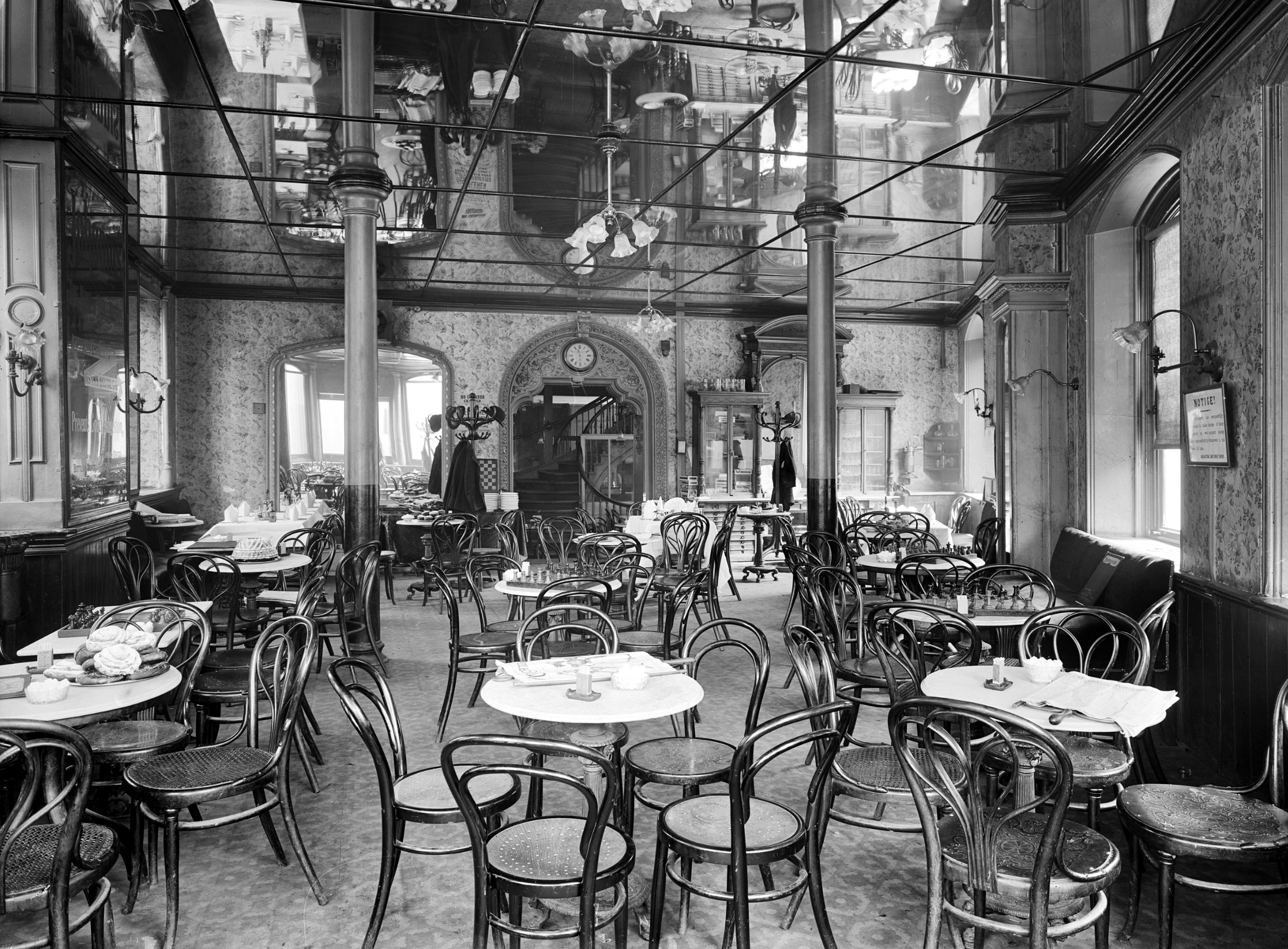
Vienna Café, Oxford Street, 29 April 1897; the first floor room with its mirrored ceiling, where the writers sat

The Vienna Café was a coffee house and restaurant at 24–28 New Oxford Street, London. Located opposite Mudie's Lending Library and near the British Museum Reading Room in Bloomsbury, it became known in the early 20th century as a meeting place for writers, artists, and intellectuals. Regular visitors included Ezra Pound, H. G. Wells, and W. B. Yeats.

The café was listed in the 1889 Baedeker Guide for London. (Note: Baedeker Guide (1889): "Vienna Café, corner of Oxford Street and Hart Street, near the British Museum".) It closed in 1914, shortly after the outbreak of World War I.

== Regulars ==
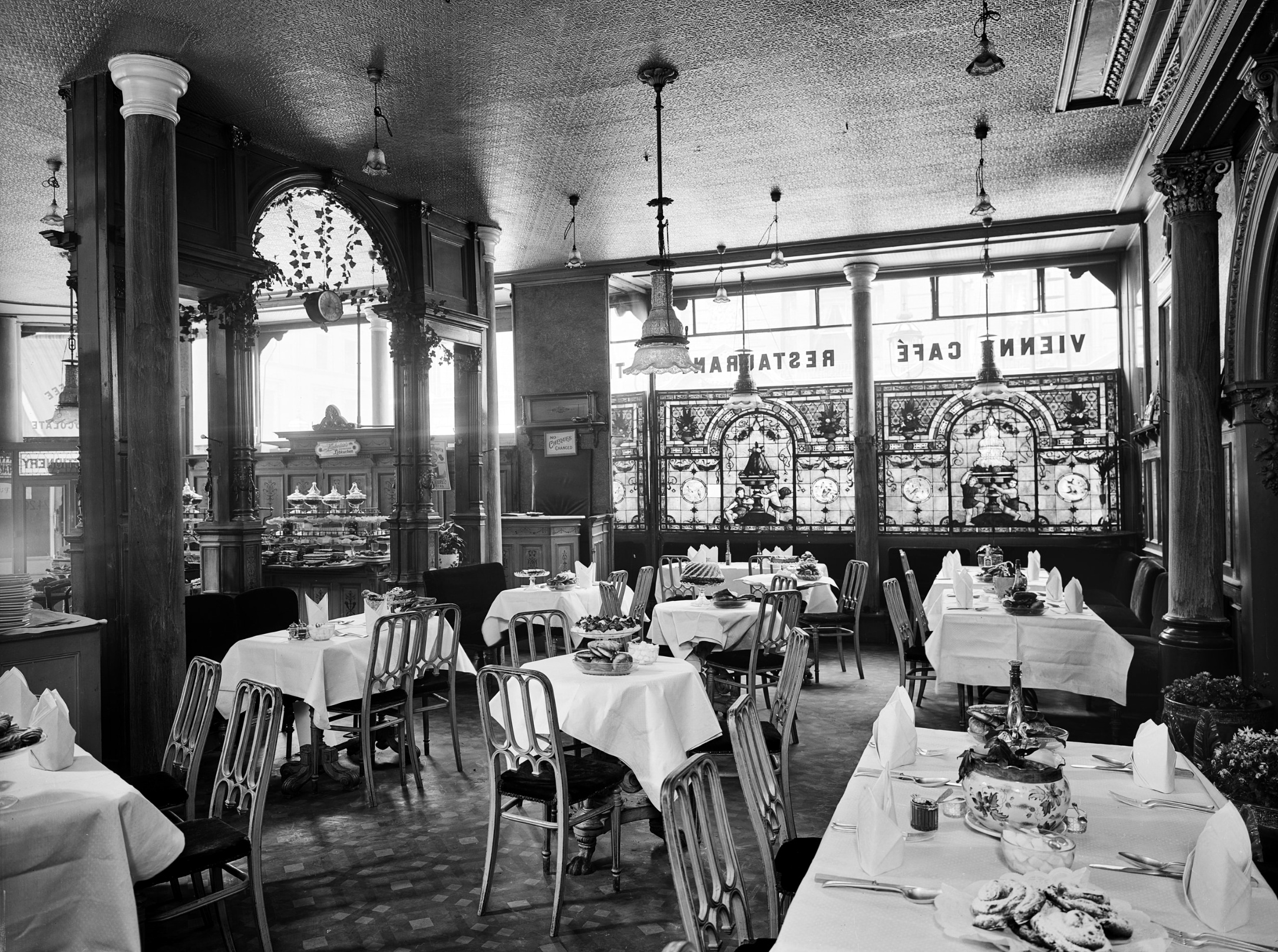
Vienna Café ground floor, 29 April 1897

The artist Wyndham Lewis first met Sturge Moore, brother of the philosopher G. E. Moore, at the Vienna Café around 1902; the men became great friends. Lewis was there with Sturge in 1910 when he was introduced to the American poet Ezra Pound. Pound, who lived in London from 1908 to 1921, had arrived in the café that day with Laurence Binyon, assistant keeper in the British Museum Print Room.

Pound noted in "How I Began" (1914) that he had lunch in the café after completing his poem Ballad of the Goodly Fere (1909) in the British Museum Reading Room. H. G. Wells also used the Vienna Café, as did Amy Lowell, Henri Gaudier-Brzeska, C. R. W. Nevinson, T. E. Hulme, R. A. Streatfeild, Robert McAlmon, and W. B. Yeats. Yeats arranged to have lunch there on 16 January 1905 with the art critic D. S. MacColl. In a letter to Wilfrid Blunt in October 1914, Pound wrote: "Yeats complains that the closing of Vienna Cafe costs him more inconvenience than the fall of Antwerp."

The poet Henry Newbolt referred to the group he met in the Vienna Café for lunch after using the Reading Room as the "Anglo-Austrians". Laurence Binyon, Walter Crum, Oswald Valentine Sickert and Barclay Squire were regulars. Others he saw there included Samuel Butler, his friend and biographer Festing Jones, Selwyn Image, John Masefield, Luigi Villari, Frederic Baron Corvo, Lawrence Weaver, Roger Fry, Edward Garnett, and a son of Giovanni Segantini. The waiter was Joseph, an Italian. Newbolt wrote that they "lived mainly on excellent Viennese dishes and talked faster and more irresponsibly than any group of equal numbers" he could remember.

The café had a triangular room on the first floor with a mirrored ceiling, "which reflected all your actions", Lewis wrote, "as if in a lake suspended above your head". The writers met at a couple of tables on the south side of that room. According to Jeffrey Meyers, the café was a haunt of European émigrés and was furnished at the time "in the Danubian mode with red plush chairs and seats". When World War I began, the Trading with the Enemy Act 1914 was swiftly passed: the owners were Austrians or Germans, who were classed as "alien enemies" under the act and as a result the business had to close.

== Appearance in The Cantos ==
Ezra Pound by Wyndham Lewis, 1919

The Vienna Café made an appearance, as the "Wiener Café", in Pound's "Canto LXXX" of The Pisan Cantos (1948):

And also near the museum they served it mit Schlag
in those days (pre 1914)
the loss of that café
meant the end of a B. M. era
(British Museum era)
Mr Lewis had been to Spain
Mr Binyon's young prodigies
pronounced the word: Penthesilea
There were mysterious figures
that emerged from recondite recesses
and ate at the WIENER CAFÉ
which died into banking [...]
So it is to Mr Binyon that I owe, initially,
Mr Lewis, Mr P. Wyndham Lewis. His bull-dog, me,
as it were against old Sturge M's bull-dog, Mr T. Sturge Moore's
bull-dog, et
meum et propositum, it is my intention
in tabernam, (Note: "It is my intention to die in a tavern.") or was, to the Wiener café

== See also ==
- English coffeehouses in the 17th and 18th centuries
- Viennese coffee house

== Sources ==
=== Works cited ===
- Baedeker, Karl (1889). London and Its Environs: Handbook for Travellers. Volume 188. Leipzig: Baedeker.
- Betsworth, Leon (2012). The Café in Modernist Literature: Wyndham Lewis, Ernest Hemingway, Jean Rhys". University of East Anglia.
- Brooker, Peter (2007) [2004]. Bohemia in London: The Social Scene of Early Modernism. Basingstoke and New York: Palgrave Macmillan. ISBN 978-0-230-54692-9
- Glinert, Ed (2007). Literary London: A Street by Street Exploration of the Capital's Literary Heritage. London: Penguin Books.
- Lewis, Wyndham (1967) [1937]. Blasting & Bombardiering. London: Calder and Boyars.
- Myers, Jeffrey (1982). The Enemy: A Biography of Wyndham Lewis. Boston: Routledge & Keegan Paul. ISBN 0-7100-9351-9
- Newbolt, Henry (1932). My World As in My Time: Memoirs 1862–1932. London: Faber & Faber. OCLC 903562977
- Pound, Ezra (1974) [June 1914]. "How I Began". In Grace Schulman (ed.). Ezra Pound: A Collection of Criticism. New York: McGraw-Hill Book Company, 23–26. ISBN 0-07-055634-2
- Pound, Ezra (2003) [1948]. The Pisan Cantos. Edited by Richard Sieburth. New York: New Directions Books. ISBN 978-0-8112-1558-9
- Shaheen, Mohammad Y. (Fall & Winter 1983). "Pound and Blunt: Homage for Apathy". Paideuma: Modern and Contemporary Poetry and Poetics. 12(2/3), 281–288. JSTOR 4726010
- Starr, Alan (Spring 1982). "Tarr and Wyndham Lewis". ELH. 49(1), 179–189. JSTOR 2872887
- Terrell, Carroll F. (1993) [1980–1984]. A Companion to The Cantos of Ezra Pound. Berkeley: University of California Press. ISBN 0-520-08287-7
- Timms, Edward (2015) [2013]. "Coffeehouses and Tea Parties: Conversational Spaces as a Stimulus to Creativity in Sigmund Freud's Vienna and Virginia Woolf's London". In Charlotte Ashby, Tag Gronberg, Simon Shaw-Miller (eds.). The Viennese Cafe and Fin-de-Siecle Culture. Berghahn Books, 199–220. ISBN 978-1-78238-926-2
- Tytell, John (1987). Ezra Pound: The Solitary Volcano. New York: Anchor Press/Doubleday. ISBN 0-385-19694-6
- Yeats, William Butler (2005). The Collected Letters of W. B. Yeats: Volume IV, 1905–1907. Edited by John Kelly and Ronald Schuchard. New York: Oxford University Press.
