= William Squire (disambiguation) =

William Squire (1917–1989) was a Welsh actor.

William Squire may also refer to:

- William Barclay Squire (1855–1927), British musicologist, librarian and librettist
- William Henry Squire (1871–1963), British cellist and composer
