= When Knights Were Bold (1916 Italian film) =

- Directed by: Oreste Visalli
- Written by: Harriett Jay (novel)
- Starring: Claudia Zambuto
- Production company: Aquila Films
- Distributed by: Aquila Films
- Release date: June 1916
- Country: Italy
- Languages: Silent; Italian intertitles

When Knights Were Bold (Italian:Il cavaliere del silenzio) is a 1916 Italian silent comedy film directed by Oreste Visalli. It is an adaptation of the 1906 play When Knights Were Bold by Harriett Jay.

The same year a separate British version, When Knights Were Bold, was also released.

== Cast ==
- Signor De Mori
- Giulio Del Torre
- Jeanne Nolly
- Leo Ragusi
- Claudia Zambuto
- Gero Zambuto

== Bibliography ==
- Goble, Alan. The Complete Index to Literary Sources in Film. Walter de Gruyter, 1999.
