= Aphrodite against Artemis =

1901 tragedy

- Written by: Thomas Sturge Moore
- Genre: Tragedy
- Setting: Troezen

Premiere
- Date: 1901
- Place: Dalston Theatre

Aphrodite against Artemis is a 1901 tragedy by British poet and playwright Thomas Sturge Moore. The play centers on the mythical queen Phaedra's lust for her stepson and is inspired chiefly by the Hippolytus of Euripides. The action is set in an enclosed farm near King Theseus's palace.

The play was given a reading at the Dalston Theatre in 1901, but it was not until 1906 that the play enjoyed a professional performance.

The play was later significantly altered by Moore. This new version of the text was performed by the Literary Theatre Society at the King's-Hall, Covent Garden in 1906, with costumes designed by Charles Ricketts. Florence Farr starred as Phaedra.

== Plot ==
Thoe, nurse to Hippolytus, the handsome son of Theseus, the absent King of Troezen, enters and as she lays firewood, remarks that rumors have spread indicating that Hippolytus's stepmother, Phaedra, is attracted to her stepson. Hippolytus returns from the hunt, followed by a fawn, whose mother he has slain. Hippolytus is a misogynist who generally scorns mortal women. While the queen's servants are saddened by the animal's death, they lust after Hippolytus, who falls asleep in the corner of the room. Phaedra enters and orders the maids to disperse. Exhausted by suppressing her desire for her stepson, Phaedra laments the restrictive life she leads as Queen before attempting to seduce Hippolytus, who is now half asleep. Mistaking her for the goddess Artemis, Hippolytus welcomes his stepmother's sexual advances, but once he awakens, he is disgusted and berates her. Phaedra recalls growing up in Crete, meeting the Minotaur, and how Theseus spurned her sister, Ariadne, abandoning her on an island and pursuing Phaedra instead. Phaedra then taunts her stepson and asks him to stab her, but Hippolytus refuses and leaves. A hysterical and delirious Phaedra hangs herself offstage, leaving a note indicating that Hippolytus raped her. Theseus returns from his adventures abroad and discovers his wife's corpse. After reading her note, Theseus prays to Poseidon, entreating him to murder Hippolytus. After Artemis appears and vindicates Hippolytus, a group of huntsmen carry out the latter's lifeless body, leaving Phaedra's corpse alone in the tent. The goddess Aphrodite reveals herself before the Queen's dead body, praising her for embracing her sexual desires. Aphrodite sets Phaedra's dead body on fire so it can achieve a final orgasm.

In Moore's revised version of the play, Artemis resurrects Hippolytus after his death. Aphrodite then casts a spell on Artemis, making her fall in love with Hippolytus. Aphrodite then has Hippolytus fall in love with a nymph, Aricia, declaring that Artemis will proceed to murder Hippolytus in an act of sexual jealousy. Artemis responds that she will be able to overcome her own passion, and in doing so help mortals overcome their own feelings of lust.

== Reception ==
A reviewer writing for The Times praised the 1901 version of the play as a whole, particularly Moore's characterization of Phaedra, whose depiction in Aphrodite Against Artemis was compared by the reviewer to "the childishly inconsequent heroine of a modern novel." Conversely, a reviewer The Pilot condemned the play, largely due to its portrayal of Phaedra, for the same reason that The Times praised it.

In 1906, a reviewer for The Times wrote about the Literary Theatre Society's production of Sturge's new version of Aphrodite Against Artemis. While the reviewer rules that Moore's work is inferior to that of Euripides's Hippolytus, he praises the production of the former, holding it superior to Moore's play itself, although the reviewer ultimately expressed mixed feelings about both the production and the play. On one hand, he appreciated "many fine passages in Mr. Moore's poetry", "Miss Florence Farr [who played the role of Phaedra] in her quieter moments", "the funeral dirge for Hippolytus", "the serenity of Artemis in the moonlight", and Charles Rickett's costume design, he disliked aspects of Moore's use of language, Farr's delivery of her character's final monologue, the performances and dialogue of Phaedra's attendants, and Aphrodite's blocking during the play's denouement.

The Daily Telegraph praised the 1906 production, particularly the performances of Florence Farr as Phaedra, Gwendolen Bishop as Aphrodite, and Penelope Wheeler as Artemis.

A negative review of Moore's play appeared in a 1906 issue of The Theosophical Review, comparing it unfavorably to Euripides's Hippolytus and deeming it a tawdry failure.
