= James Welch (actor) =

Welch in 1904

James Welch (6 November 1865 – 10 April 1917) was an English actor, whose career embraced a wide range of roles, from tragic and dramatic to comic. He created parts in plays by Bernard Shaw and W. S. Gilbert and appeared in early British performances of plays by Henrik Ibsen. He was best known to the public for his appearance in a comedy, When Knights Were Bold, in which he first played in 1906, appeared in revivals between then and 1914 and filmed in 1916.

== Life and career ==
Welch was born in Liverpool, Lancashire on 6 November 1865, the son of John Robert Welch – a chartered accountant – and his wife Lucy née Horner. He was educated at Liverpool College, and served his articles with his father, but acted as an amateur in his spare time. He moved to London in the late 1880s at the same time as his future brother-in-law, the poet Richard Le Gallienne. The latter became secretary to the actor-manager Wilson Barrett, who accepted Welch into his company as an actor.

Welch remained with Barrett's company for two and a half years, including an American tour. According to The Times, by the early 1990s Welch had made a reputation as "one of the most brilliant players on the London stage, whether in comedy or in pathetic characters".

He took part in some of the first productions of plays by Bernard Shaw, appearing as Lickcheese in Widowers' Houses in 1892, as Major Petkoff in Arms and the Man in 1894 and as William in You Never Can Tell in 1903. As well as playing Shavian comedy, Welch was among the first British actors to appear in plays by Ibsen: An Enemy of the People (1893), John Gabriel Borkman and The Wild Duck (1897).

Welch's biggest stage hit was in the comedy When Knights Were Bold, in which he played Sir Guy de Vere, a modern young British officer, who falls asleep, dreams of himself as a medieval knight and on waking applies vigorous chivalry to see off a rival and become betrothed to his beloved. He created the role in the 1906 premiere and appeared in revivals between then and 1914. He starred in a silent film adaptation of the play in 1916. Another of his comic stage hits was the farce The New Clown, first given in 1902, revived in 1906 and 1914, and filmed in 1916.

By contrast with his comic roles, Welch was also known for playing dramatic or tragic roles. He was the central character in W. S. Gilbert's last play, The Hooligan (1911), as a murderer, condemned to hang but dying of heart failure on hearing that his sentence has been commuted to imprisonment. The reviewer in The Illustrated London News commented that if playgoers were not moved by the play "and by the superb acting of Mr James Welch as the criminal, then nothing will move them. Mr Welch's study of awful fear is really great and memorable art". A colleague said of him that he found that playing tragedy took much out of him because he felt rather than simply acted the pain and horror, but nonetheless he longed to play King Lear.

In January 1893 Welch married Mary Elizabeth Gallienne. The marriage was happy for some years but the two grew apart (Welch acknowledged that this was his fault rather than hers) and she divorced him for desertion in 1905. In August 1906 Welch married the actress Amy Fisher, known professionally as Audrey Ford, a daughter of Lottie Venne.

Welch died in a nursing home in Ringwood, Hampshire on 10 April 1917 at the age of 51.

== Sources ==
- Parker, John; Freda Gaye; Ian Herbert, eds. (1978). Who Was Who in the Theatre. Detroit: Gale Research. OCLC 310466458.
- Stedman, Jane W. (1996). W. S. Gilbert, A Classic Victorian & His Theatre. Oxford University Press. ISBN 978-0-19-816174-5.
