= The Hooligan =

Play by W. S. Gilbert

1911 photograph of the play's dénouement

The Hooligan, A Character Study is a one-act play by W. S. Gilbert. It opened at the Coliseum Theatre in London on 27 February 1911 and ran for a month, being played both in the evenings and at matinees, for a total of about 42 performances.

The Hooligan was Gilbert's last play, produced just over three months before his death. It is a study of a young condemned murderer in a prison cell awaiting execution, inspired by the celebrated Crippen murder trial of 1910. Gilbert's three-dimensional portrait of the prisoner, and the play's ending plot twist, surprised audiences and critics. In the play, as in some of his earlier pieces, Gilbert shows sympathy for people who commit a crime after enduring a hard life, expressing his opinion that nurture rather than nature was often the cause of criminal behaviour.

== Synopsis ==
Nat Solly, a young cockney hooligan, the son of a thief and brought up among thieves, has been condemned to death by hanging for murdering his former girlfriend. He wakes up on the morning of his execution hysterical, self-pitying, angry at the judge and self-justifying. However, Solly is not wholly unsympathetic, as his predicament is intolerable. He pleads for leniency on account of his weak heart, and because he didn't mean to kill the girl, only to "cut" her to teach her a lesson. His warders try to hearten him. A step is heard outside the door. He thinks they are coming to take him to his execution, but it is the Governor, the chaplain and the others arriving to tell him that his sentence has been commuted to penal servitude for life, or twenty years with good behaviour. Solly, unable to bear the shock of this news, dies of a heart attack.

== Background ==
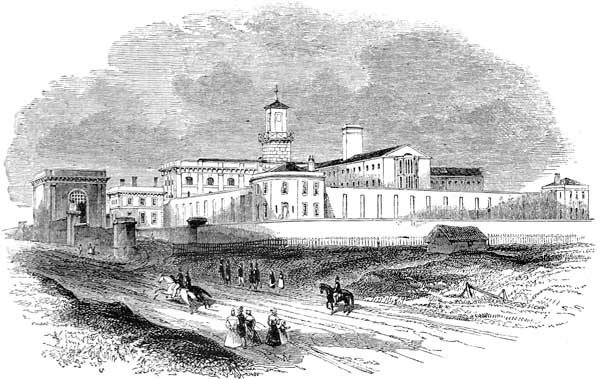
Pentonville Prison in 1842

Gilbert was inspired by the celebrated Crippen murder trial of 1910. As usual, Gilbert was thorough in his research, touring the Pentonville Prison and questioning its governor about procedures and also bringing the scenic designer to see it. The piece was so grim and powerful that, according to Mrs. Alec Tweedie, "women [in the audience] had gone out fainting." The Hooligan was one of Gilbert's most successful serious dramas, and experts conclude that, in those last months of Gilbert's life, he was developing a new style, a "mixture of irony, of social theme, and of grubby realism," to replace the old "Gilbertianism" that he had grown weary of. The main character, Solly, dies of a heart attack. Gilbert himself died of a heart attack only a few months after producing the play.

Into the 20th century, the Theatre Managers' Association had prohibited dramas from being presented in music halls. Oswald Stoll, manager of the Coliseum, challenged this ban, and finally the Association agreed that plays of up to thirty minutes and not more than six speaking characters could be performed. With The Hooligan, Gilbert was the first important dramatist to write for a music hall. Gilbert, who directed his own plays, almost cancelled the production when the leading actor, James Welch, took liberties with the script, until Welch wrote a letter of apology.

Gilbert paints a three-dimensional portrait of the prisoner with all his flaws and humanity. Aside from the surprise ending, there is no plot mechanism to interfere with the delineation of character, and as in Gilbert's earlier character piece Sweethearts (1874), the result shows Gilbert to be successful at such pure character-writing. In The Hooligan, Gilbert revisited one of his old themes from his play Charity (1874) and some of his other works, by pointing out "that the punishment of a man who never had been given a chance to rise out of the gutter should not be the same as the punishment of a man who had thrown away his chances." In the play, Gilbert shows obvious sympathy for his protagonist, the son of a thief who, brought up among thieves, has killed his girlfriend. Ian Bradley notes that the playwright displays "his conviction that nurture rather than nature often accounted for criminal behaviour".

The play was produced by the Lantern Theatre in Brighton in 2017 together with Gilbert's Sweethearts. It was played in 2024 at It was presented by Gilbert and Sullivan Opera Victoria in Australia in 2024.

== Roles ==
- Nat Solly
- 1st Warder
- 2nd Warder
- Chief Warder
- 1st New Warder Mathers
- 2nd New Warder
- Governor
- Chaplain
- Doctor
- Two Under-sheriffs

== Response ==
The play received generally good reviews. The Illustrated London News commented,

"[H]ow much more than usually must [Gilbert] challenge our interest when he, the successor of Robertson, the apostle of fantasy, suddenly elects to rival the newest school of our dramatists on their own ground! ... [Gilbert] will confront us with that grimmest of all scenes of human misery ... the condemned murderer being prepared for his fate on the very morning of his execution. [plot summary] ... So ends a drama that is absolutely sincere, unflinchingly realistic, and makes no concessions in the way of fine writing or sentiment. It bears the very stamp of truth, as it should do, for it is the work of a magistrate, and its whole pathos ... depends on its never straining a point. If playgoers are not moved by the almost bald simplicity of the episode and by the superb acting of Mr. James Welch as the criminal, then nothing will move them."

The Observer focused on the grimness of the story, wondering whether it was appropriate for the stage: "Those who are in search of a 'mauvais quart d'heure' ... will certainly not be disappointed by the masterly and relentless skill with which Sir W. S. Gilbert and Mr. James Welch between them administer the desired sensation as part of an evening's variety entertainment. ... How far such a subject as this is suited for illustration on the stage may be open to doubt. But ... [if] the thing was to be done at all it could not have been done better, and there criticism must leave it." The Stageland column in the Penny Illustrated Paper noted, "It disturbed everyone. Most to applause; a few to resentment. [A playgoer told the reviewer:] 'A man of a morbid turn of mind might think it all right, mightn't he?' ... a play like that is a play which you ought to pop in and see at once."

Holbrook Jackson later wrote, "The theme is so painful as to be almost unbearable. I have seen people walk out in the midst of this play unable to stand any more of it. Yet those who remained in the grip of the horror, watching Welch revealing the fear of a condemned man during his supposed last few moments on earth – the fear of a man ... who has very little worth preserving in his life – those who remained laughed every now and then at the humour of it. Some things may be too deep for tears, but nothing is too deep for laughter."
