= London Coliseum =

Theatre in Westminster, London

- The Coliseum Theatre; London Coliseum Theatre of Varieties; Coliseum Cinerama; The Coli
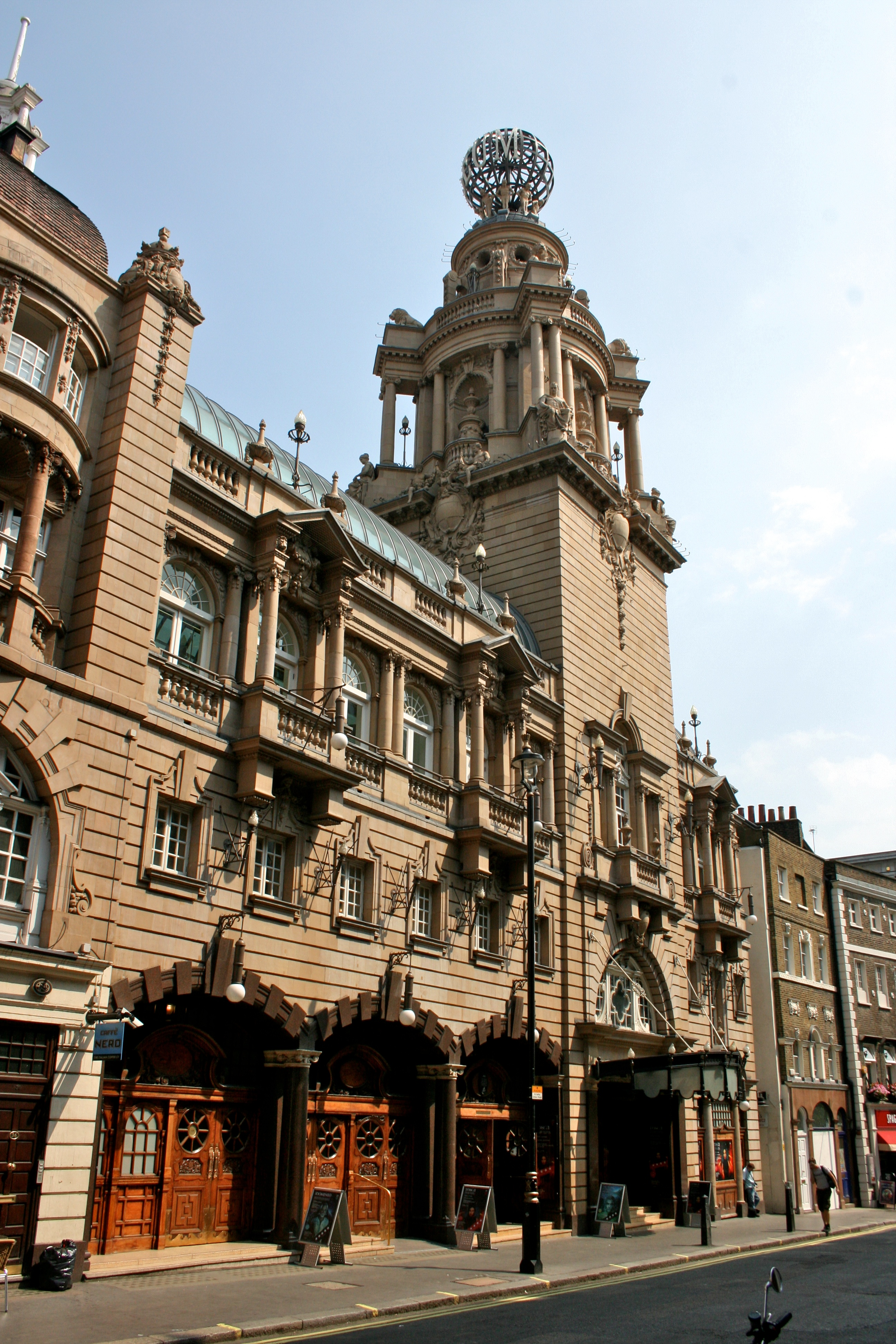
- London Coliseum in 2004
- Interactive map of London Coliseum
- Address: St Martin's Lane; London, WC2; United Kingdom
- Coordinates: 51.509722°N 0.126389°W
- Owner: English National Opera
- Capacity: 2,359 seats on 3 tiers (4 levels)
- Current use: Opera house
- Public transit: Charing Cross; Leicester Square; Charing Cross

Construction
- Opened: 24 December 1904; 121 years ago
- Renovated: 1968, 2000–2004

Listed Building – Grade II*
- Official name: London Coliseum
- Designated: 20 September 1960
- Reference no.: 1236022
- Architect: Frank Matcham

Website
- londoncoliseum.org

The London Coliseum (also known as the Coliseum Theatre) is a theatre in St Martin's Lane, Westminster, built as one of London's largest and most luxurious family variety theatres. Opened on 24 December 1904 as the London Coliseum Theatre of Varieties, it was designed by the architect Frank Matcham for the impresario Oswald Stoll. Their ambition was to build the largest and finest music hall, described as the "people's palace of entertainment" of its age.

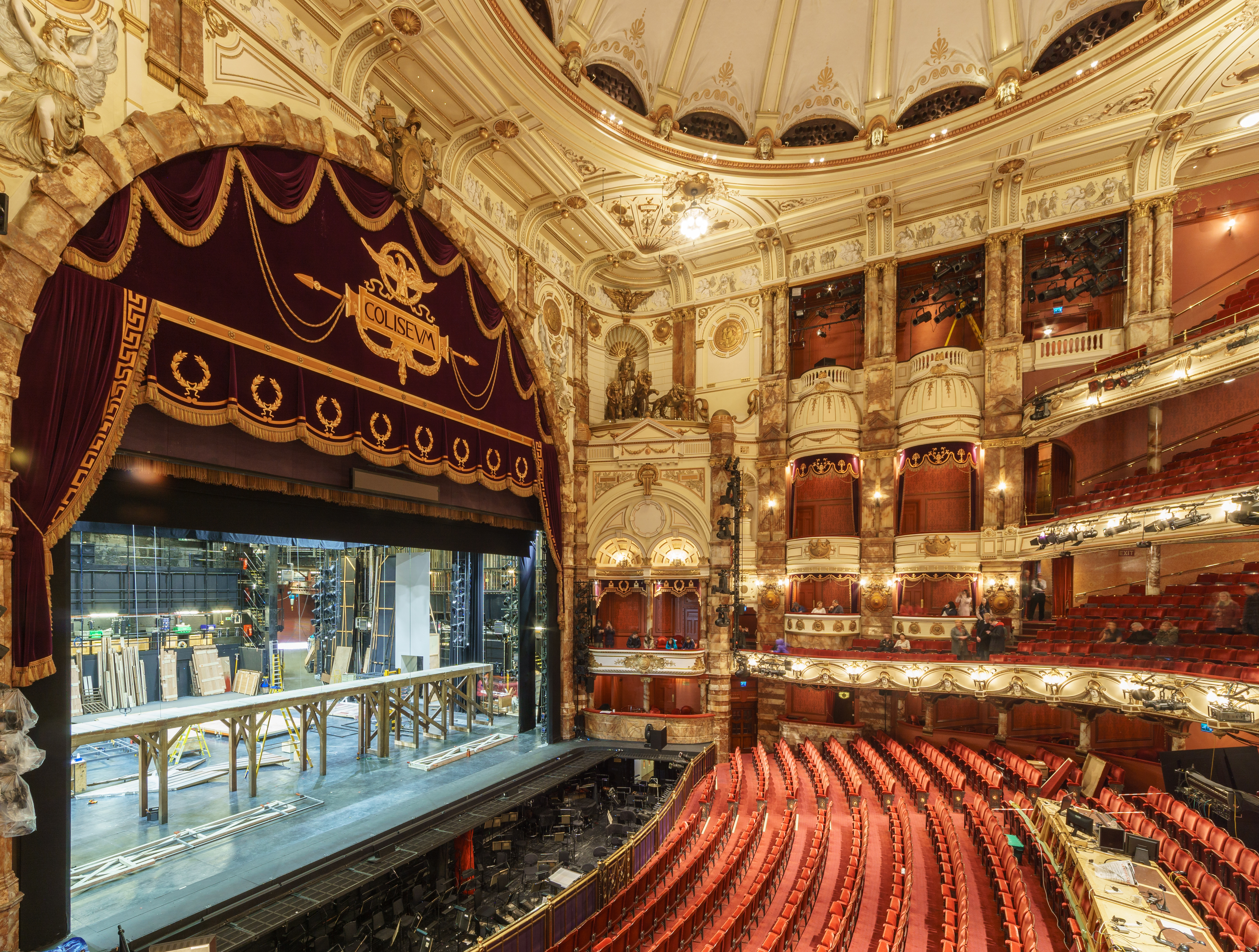
Interior showing stage, orchestra pit, boxes, and seating

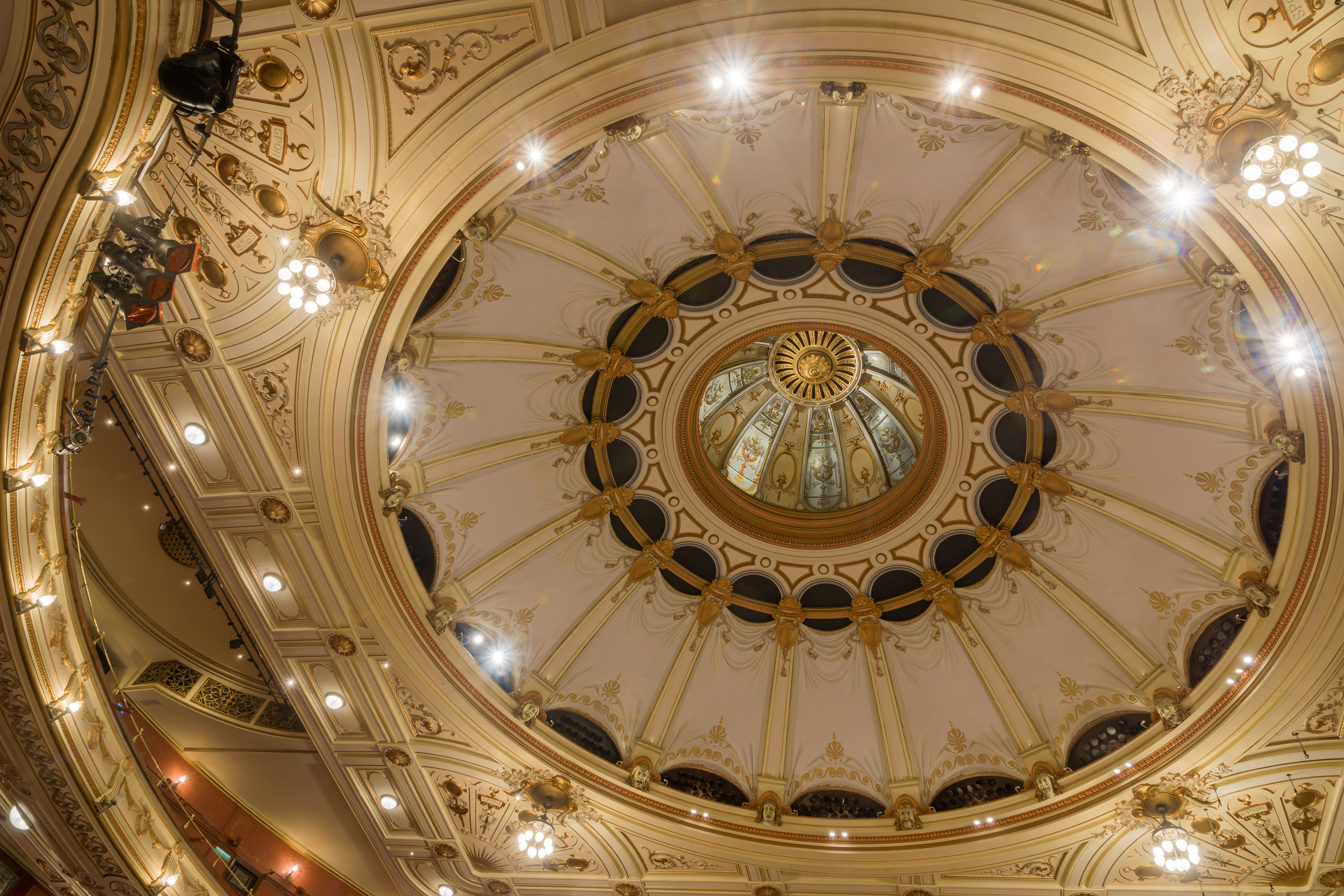
The domed ceiling

At the time of construction the Coliseum was one of the few theatres in Europe to provide lifts for taking patrons to the upper levels of the house, and was the first theatre in England to have a triple revolve installed on its stage. It has 2,359 seats – the largest capacity of any theatre in London.

After being used for variety shows, musical comedies, and stage plays for many years, then between 1963 and 1968 as a cinema screening films in the Cinerama format, the Sadler's Wells Opera Company moved into the building in 1968. The Sadler's Wells company changed its name to the English National Opera in 1974, and today the theatre is used primarily for opera as well as being the London home of the English National Ballet.

== History ==
The London Coliseum was built by the architect Frank Matcham, who intended it to be one of London's largest and most luxurious family variety theatres. Construction began in 1903, and the venue opened on 24 December the following year as the London Coliseum Theatre of Varieties. It is located in St Martin's Lane, London.

Matcham built the theatre for the theatrical impresario Sir Oswald Stoll, and had the ambition of it being the largest and finest "people's palace of entertainment" of the age.

Matcham wanted a theatre of variety – not a music hall but equally not highbrow entertainment. The resulting programme was a mix of music hall and variety theatre, with one act – a full scale revolving chariot race – requiring the stage to revolve. The theatre's original slogan was pro bono publico ('for the public good'). It was opened in 1904 and the inaugural performance was a variety bill on 24 December that year.

English Heritage, in its description of the theatre when it was given listed status in 1960, notes that it is an "exuberant Free Baroque ambitious design, the Edwardian 'Theatre de Luxe of London' with richly decorated interiors and a vast and grandiose auditorium." The theatre has a "lavish foyer and circulation areas with marble facings, culminating in vast 3-tier auditorium with wealth of eclectic classical detail of Byzantine opulence, some motifs such as the squat columns dividing the lowest tier of slip boxes, backing the stalls, almost Sullivanesque; pairs of 2-tiered bow fronted boxes with domed canopies at gallery level and semi-domed, Ionic-columned pairs of 2 tiered orchestra boxes, contained in arched and pedimented frames surmounted by sculptural groups with lion-drawn chariots. Great, semi-circular, blocked architrave proscenium arch with cartouche-trophy keystone."

The inaugural performance was a variety bill on 24 December 1904, but it "was a total failure and closed down completely only two years after opening in 1906 and remained closed until December of 1907 when it was reopened and at last became successful." In 1908, the London Coliseum was host to a cricket match between Middlesex and Surrey. In 1911, dramatist W. S. Gilbert produced his last play here, The Hooligan.

The theatre changed its name from the London Coliseum to the Coliseum Theatre between 1931 and 1968 when a run of 651 performances of the operetta White Horse Inn began on 8 April 1931. Additionally, "pantomimes began in 1936 with Cinderella and continued regularly until 1946. In 1947 the musical Annie Get Your Gun was staged at the Coliseum and had a staggeringly successful run for the time, of 1,304 performances and three continuous years which was the longest run in theatrical history. There then followed a long run of major American hits beginning with Kiss Me, Kate in 1951, Guys And Dolls in 1953, The Pajama Game in 1955, and Damn Yankees in 1957. But this exceptional period did at last come to an end in 1957 when the production of Bells Are Ringing failed to enthrall anyone."

The Coliseum reverted to its original name when the Sadler's Wells Opera Company moved there in 1968, and in 1974 the company changed its name to the English National Opera; it bought the freehold of the building for £12.8 million in 1992. The theatre hosted both the 2004 and 2006 Royal Variety Performances and is also the London base for performances by English National Ballet, which perform regular seasons throughout the year when not on tour.

The Who performed there on 14 December 1969, and recorded the concert.

== Technical aspects ==
While its wing space is limited due to the constricted site on which the theatre was built, "the stage of the London Coliseum was also on a vast scale; 55 feet wide by 92 feet deep". The stage is not raked. It has the widest proscenium arch in London and was one of the first to have electric lighting. It was built with a triple revolving stage, although this was rarely used. The Coliseum was originally designed to seat 2,939 people on four levels. Despite the seating capacity being reduced since the theatre's opening, it still has the largest seating capacity of any theatre in the West End at 2,359.

The theatre retains many of its original features and was given a Grade II* listed building by English Heritage in September 1960. Prior to Sadler's Wells Opera Company taking over the Coliseum in 1968, the house was "fully restored, redecorated, and a large orchestra pit installed". It reopened on 21 August 1968, with a production of the opera Don Giovanni.

Another extensive renovation took place between 2000 and 2004. when the design team included the architects RHWL and Arup as acousticians and building engineers.

The London Coliseum has two lifts which provide step-free access for disabled patrons to all levels, except the Upper Circle.

== Use as a cinema ==
Periodically, the Coliseum was used to show films and, when the "'talkies' arrived at the Coliseum in 1933, films were run at the theatre for a year. The greatest sensation at this time was the showing of King Kong which ran at the Coliseum for months with 10,000 people seeing the film there every day."

After a lacklustre period of poorly received musicals came to an end, in June 1961 the theatre was leased by MGM for use as a cinema during the period that the Empire, Leicester Square was closed for rebuilding. The initial presentation, from 6 June, was a revival of Gone With the Wind which ran for 3 months. On 2 November the World Premiere of Bachelor in Paradise took place in the presence of the film's star, Bob Hope, and following this, on 15 November, was the UK premiere of Samuel Bronston's epic King of Kings. MGM continued to use the theatre even after the new Empire, Leicester Square reopened in December 1962, but MGM's lease expired on 19 May 1963 and the theatre was then leased by the Cinerama Corporation to become the second of London's Cinerama locations (after the Casino Cinerama).

Conversion to three-strip projection which used three projectors was undertaken, and an 80 ft wide, 30 ft tall deeply curved screen was installed. Beginning on 16 July 1963, the theatre was renamed the Coliseum Cinerama, with the UK premiere of The Wonderful World of the Brothers Grimm. This film transferred to the third of London's Cinerama houses, the Royalty Theatre on 27 November and the Coliseum was converted for single-projector Cinerama using 70 mm film for the Gala UK Premiere of It's a Mad, Mad, Mad, Mad, World on 2 December 1963. Other 70 mm films followed, The Magnificent Showman (the UK Title of Circus World), The Great Race (a 35 mm blow up) and The Bible. With fewer films made in the format, it later became difficult to programme the theatre. It resorted to revivals of old 70 mm movies before opening The Comedians on 18 January 1968 (a 70 mm Panavision blow up). This ran for nine weeks and was followed by a revival of the 1956 Todd-AO epic Around the World in 80 Days, the first time this film had been shown in 70 mm in London. This ran until 22 May 1968 when Cinerama pulled out and the theatre reverted to live use.
