= Arms and the Man =

Play by George Bernard Shaw

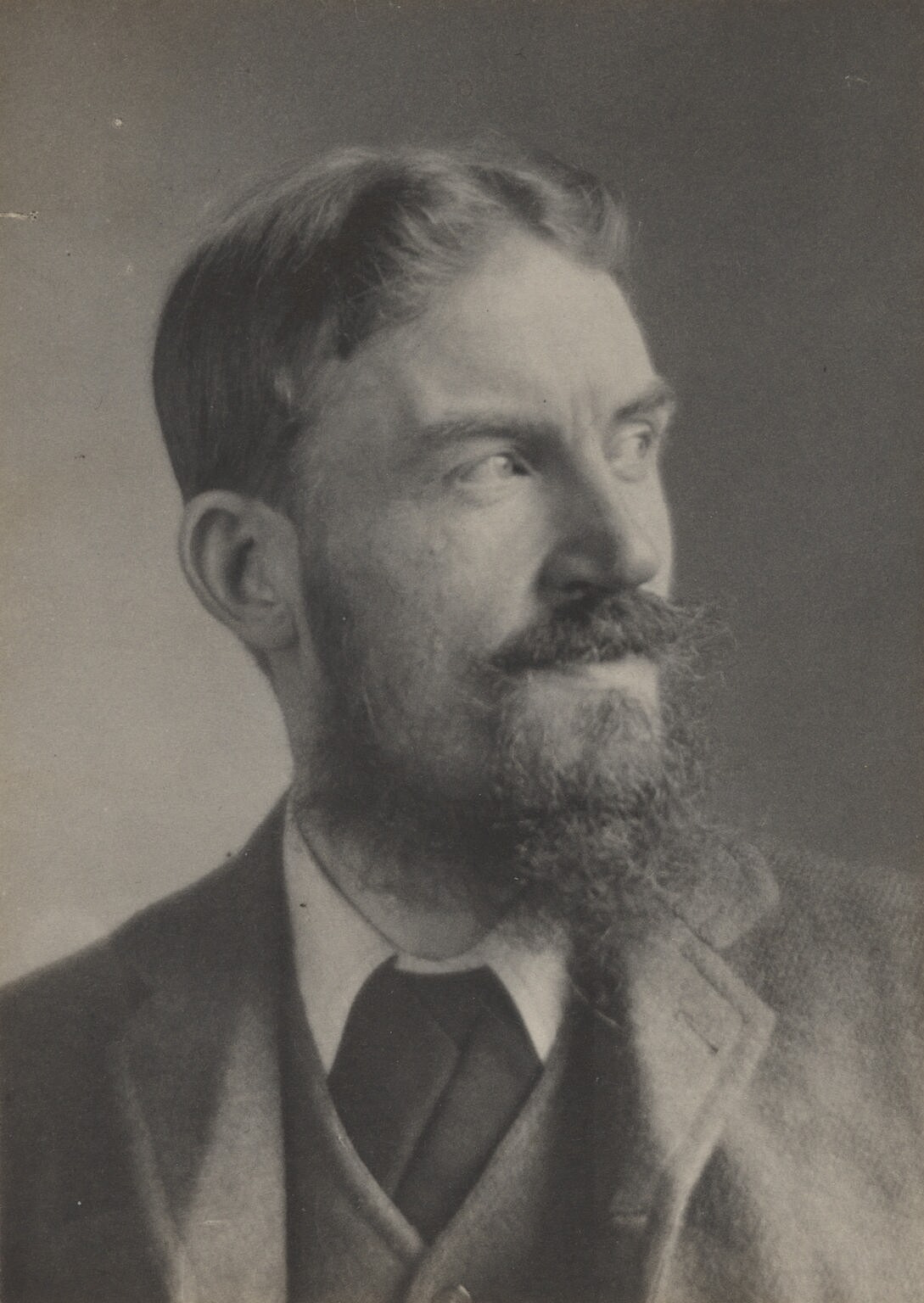
- Shaw at the time of the production of Arms and the Man
- Written by: George Bernard Shaw
- Subject: Love and war

Premiere
- Date: 21 April 1894
- Place: Avenue Theatre, London

Arms and the Man is a comedy by Bernard Shaw. Its title comes from the opening words of Virgil's Aeneid, Arma virumque cano (Of arms and the man I sing).

The play was first produced on 21 April 1894 at the Avenue Theatre in London and published in 1898 as part of Shaw's Plays Pleasant volume, which also included Candida, You Never Can Tell, and The Man of Destiny. Arms and the Man was one of Shaw's first commercial successes. He humorously exposes the futility of war and the hypocrisies of human nature.

== Characters and original cast ==
- Major Paul Petkoff – James Welch
- Major Sergius Saranoff – Bernard Gould
- Captain Bluntschli – Yorke Stephens
- Major Plechanoff – A. E. W. Mason
- Nicola – Orlando Barnett
- Catherine Petkoff – Mrs Charles Calvert
- Raïna Petkoff – Alma Murray
- Louka – Florence Farr

Source: The Stage.

== Plot summary ==
The play takes place during the 1885 Serbo-Bulgarian War. Its heroine, Raina Petkoff, is a young Bulgarian woman engaged to Sergius Saranoff, a battlefield hero whom she idolizes. On the night after the Battle of Slivnitza, Captain Bluntschli, a Swiss mercenary in the defeated Serbian army, climbs in through her bedroom balcony and threatens her not to give the alarm. When Russian and Bulgarian troops burst in to search for him, Raina hides him. He tells her that "nine soldiers out of ten are born fools". Bluntschli's businesslike attitude to war shocks the idealistic Raina, especially after he admits that he uses his ammunition pouches to carry chocolates rather than pistol cartridges. When the search dies down, Raina and her mother Catherine sneak him out of the house, disguised in one of Raina's father's old coats.

James Welch as Major Petkoff, 1894

The war ends and Raina's father, Major Paul Petkoff, returns home with Sergius. Raina begins to find Sergius bombastic and tiresome, but she hides it. Sergius also finds Raina's romantic ideals tiresome, and flirts with Raina's insolent servant girl Louka (a soubrette role), who is engaged to the Petkoffs' manservant Nicola. Bluntschli unexpectedly returns to give back the old coat, but also to see Raina. Raina and her mother are shocked when Major Petkoff and Sergius reveal that they have met Bluntschli before and invite him to lunch (and to help them figure out how to send the troops home).

Left alone with Bluntschli, Raina realizes that though he sees through her romanticism, he respects her, as Sergius does not. She reveals that she left a photograph of herself in a pocket of the coat, inscribed "To my chocolate-cream soldier", but Bluntschli says he did not find it, and it must still be in the coat. Bluntschli gets a telegram informing him of his father's death: he must now take over the family's luxury hotels in Switzerland.

Louka gossips to Sergius that Raina had protected Bluntschli and is in love with him. Sergius challenges Bluntschli to a duel, but Bluntschli evades it. Sergius and Raina break off their engagement, with some relief on both sides. Major Petkoff discovers the photograph in the pocket of his old coat; Raina and Bluntschli try to dispose of it, but Petkoff is determined to learn the truth and claims that the "chocolate-cream soldier" is Sergius. After Bluntschli confesses the whole story to Major Petkoff, Sergius proposes marriage to Louka (to Major Petkoff and Catherine's horror); the manservant Nicola quietly and gallantly lets Sergius have her; and Bluntschli, recognising Nicola's merits, offers him a job as hotel manager.

While Raina is now unattached, Bluntschli protests that—being 34 and believing she is 17—he is too old for her. On learning that she is actually 23, he immediately proposes and shows her the telegram announcing his inheritance. Raina, realizing the hollowness of her romantic ideals, protests that she would prefer him as a poor "chocolate-cream soldier" than as a wealthy businessman. Bluntschli protests that he is still the same person, and she proclaims her love for him. The play ends as Bluntschli, with Swiss precision, arranges the major's troop movements and informs them he will return to marry Raina in exactly two weeks.

== Reception ==
Shaw was called onstage after the curtain, where he received enthusiastic applause. Amid the cheers, one audience member booed. Shaw riposted, "My dear fellow, I quite agree with you, but what are we against so many?" (Note: Shaw's contemporary W. B. Yeats was present for the performance, and rendered this quotation differently in his autobiography: "I assure the gentleman in the gallery that he and I are of exactly the same opinion, but what can we do against a whole house who are of the contrary opinion?") George Orwell said that Arms and the Man was written when Shaw was at the height of his powers as a dramatist. "It is probably the wittiest play he ever wrote, the most flawless technically, and in spite of being a very light comedy, the most telling." His other plays of the period, equally well written, were about issues that, according to Orwell, were no longer controversial at the time Orwell was writing. For example, the theme of Mrs. Warren's Profession, which so shocked audiences at the time, was that the causes of prostitution are mainly economic, which was already a common opinion in Orwell's time, and the play Widowers' Houses was an attack on slum landlords, who had since become stock villains.

In 2024, an attempt to stage John Malkovich's production of the play at Ivan Vazov National Theatre of Bulgaria was targeted by nationalist protesters that considered it a calumny of Bulgaria. The mob surrounded the theatre, threw smoke bombs, prevented the visitors that had bought tickets from entering the theatre hall, accusing them of being traitors and threatening them, and physically assaulted the director of the play and the director of the theatre.

== Revivals ==
=== West End ===
Theatre	Date	Bluntschli	Sergius	Raina	Petkoff	Louka	Ref
Savoy	30 Dec 1907	Robert Loraine	Harley Granville-Barker	Lillah McCarthy	Michael Sherbrooke	Auriol Lee	
Criterion	18 May 1911	Arnold Daly	Dawson Milward	Margaret Halstan	J. Fisher White	Jean Mackinlay Stirling	
Duke of York's	11 Dec 1919	Robert Loraine	Gerald Lawrence	Stella Mervyn-Campbell	M. R. Morand	Dorothy Holmes-Gore	
Everyman	6 Mar 1922	Milton Rosmer	Gordon Bailey	Isabel Jeans	Michael Sherbrooke	Dorothy Holmes-Gore	
Everyman	16 Sep 1926	Robert Loraine	Frank Vosper	Jeanne de Casalis	Michael Sherbrooke	Joyce Kennedy	
Court	23 Dec 1929	Esmé Percy	George E. Bancroft	Rosalind Fuller	Wilfrid Lawson	Dora Macdona	
Old Vic	16 Feb 1931	Ralph Richardson	John Gielgud	Marie Ney	George Howe	Dorothy Green	
Embassy	15 Jul 1935	James Dale	Alan Webb	Joan Marion	Alan Wheatley	Catherine Cordell	
New	5 Sep 1944	Ralph Richardson	Laurence Olivier	Margaret Leighton	Nicholas Hannen	Joyce Redman	
Arts	25 Jun 1953	Alec Clunes	Robin Bailey	Diane Cilento	Cyril Luckham	Gwen Cherril	
Mermaid	20 Mar 1962	Joss Ackland	David Knight	Jane Merrow	Richard Wordsworth	Sally Smith	
Lyric	14 Oct 1981	Richard Briers	Peter Egan	Alice Krige	Richard Pearson	Anna Nygh	

=== North America ===
==== New York ====
The Internet Broadway Database lists seven productions of the play:

- September 1894, presented by Richard Mansfield and his company.
- November 1899, at the Garden Theatre.
- April 1906, produced by and starring Arnold Daly.
- May 1915, again featuring Arnold Daly, with Montagu Love.
- September 1925, presented by the Theatre Guild, with Alfred Lunt as Bluntschli, Pedro De Cordoba as Sergius, Lynn Fontanne as Raina and Ernest Cossart as Petkoff. The production ran for 180 performances.
- October 1950 at the Arena Theatre with a cast including Francis Lederer as Bluntschli, Sam Wanamaker as Sergius and Lee Grant; it ran for 108 performances.
- May 1985 at the Circle in the Square Theatre; John Malkovich directed a revival starring Kevin Kline as Bluntschli (later replaced by Malkovich after Kline's departure), Raul Julia as Sergius and Glenne Headly as Raina. It ran for 109 performances.

In 2023 the play was produced off-Broadway on Theatre Row by Gingold Theatrical Group, directed by David Staller.

==== US elsewhere ====
- Marlon Brando's final stage appearance was in Arms and the Man in 1953. He gathered friends who were fellow actors into a company for a summer stock production. He chose to play Sergius while William Redfield starred as Bluntschli.
- The Studio Arena Theater in Buffalo, New York, put on a production of Arms and the Man in 1983 with Kelsey Grammer as Sergius.

==== Canada ====
- The play was produced in 1982 at the Stratford Shakespeare Festival, with Brian Bedford as Bluntschli and Len Cariou as Sergius.
- The Shaw Festival at Niagara-on-the-Lake, Ontario, has presented the play in 1967, 1976, 1986, 1994, 2006 and 2014, the last directed by Morris Panych.
- In the summer of 2013 Odyssey Theatre in Ottawa performed a masked performance of this play.

== Adaptations ==
=== Radio ===
The BBC has broadcast six radio adaptions of the play:

- in 1939, with Barry Jones as Bluntschli, John Wyse as Sergius and Peggy Ashcroft as Raina.
- in 1948, with Richard Williams, John Wyse and Beryl Calder.
- in 1951, with Michael Hordern, John Bushelle and Ursula Howells.
- in 1961, with Ralph Richardson as Bluntschli, John Gielgud as Sergius, Vanessa Redgrave as Raina and Judi Dench as Louka.
- in 1984, with Andrew Sachs as Bluntschli, Gary Bond as Sergius and Jackie Smith-Wood as Raina.
- in 2010, with Rory Kinnear as Bluntschli, Tom Mison as Sergius and Lydia Leonard as Raina.

An audio version was produced in 1999 by the CBC starring Simon Bradbury as Bluntschli, Andrew Gillies as Sergius and Elizabeth Brown as Raina.

=== Television ===
Television adaptations include:

- BBC, 1946, with Andre Morell as Bluntschli, Francis James as Sergius and Rosemary Scott as Raina.
- BBC, 1948, with Cyril Raymond, Clement McCallin and Margaret Leighton.
- BBC, 1952, with Laurence Payne, Peter Copley and Marcia Ashton.
- BBC, 1958, with Alan MacNaughtan, Stanley Baker and Susan Maryott.
- ITV, 1961, with Maurice Kaufmann, Clinton Greyn and Sylvia Francis.
- ITV, 1971, with John Standing, Laurence Harvey and Anna Calder-Marshall.
- Channel 4, 1983: a film of the 1981 West End revival with Briers, Egan and Krige; it was first broadcast on 15 January 1983.
- BBC, 1989, with Pip Torrens, Patrick Ryecart and Helena Bonham-Carter.

=== Other ===
- Shaw gave Leopold Jacobson the rights to adapt the play into what became the operetta The Chocolate Soldier (1908) with music by Oscar Straus, but under three conditions: none of Shaw's dialogue or character names could be used, the musical version must be advertised as a parody of Shaw's play, and Shaw would accept no payment. Nonetheless, the operetta kept Shaw's original plot and central message. Shaw despised the result, calling it "a putrid opéra bouffe in the worst taste of 1860", but grew to regret not accepting payment when, despite his opinion, it became a lucrative international success.
- A 1932 British film adaptation (now believed lost) was directed by Cecil Lewis. It starred Barry Jones as Bluntschli and Anne Grey as Raina.
- A filmed version of Arms and the Man in German entitled Helden (Heroes) starring O. W. Fischer and Liselotte Pulver was runner up for the Academy Award for Best Foreign Language Film in 1958.

== Pejorative military use of "chocolate soldier" ==
The chocolate-cream soldier of the play has inspired a pejorative military use of the term. Israeli soldiers use the term "chocolate soldier" (hayal shel shokolad, חייל של שוקולד) to disparage a soldier not tough enough to fight. The Australian Citizens Military Force were derided by the regular army as "chokos" or chocolate soldiers, implying they were not real soldiers.
