= The New Clown =

- Directed by: Fred Paul
- Written by: H. M. Paull (play); Benedict James
- Starring: James Welch; Manora Thew; Richard Lindsay; Tom Coventry
- Production company: Ideal Film Company
- Distributed by: Ideal Film Company
- Release date: 1916
- Country: United Kingdom
- Language: English

The New Clown is a 1916 British silent comedy film directed by Fred Paul and starring James Welch, Manora Thew and Richard Lindsay. It was based on a play by H. M. Paull. The screenplay concerns an aristocrat who runs away to join the circus.

== Plot summary ==
After mistakenly believing he has killed a man, an aristocrat runs away to join the circus where he enjoys a series of comic adventures.

== Cast ==
- James Welch - Lord Cyril Garston
- Manora Thew - Rosie Dixon
- Richard Lindsay - Captain Trent
- Tom Coventry - Tom Baker
- Brian Daly - Pennyquick
- E.C. Arundell - Strong Man
- Kathleen Blake - Maud Chesterton
- Marjory Day - Winnie Chesterton
- Edward Sass - Showman
- Arthur Milton - Innkeeper
- Fred Rains - Clown
