= When Knights Were Bold (1929 film) =

1929 film by Tim Whelan

- Directed by: Tim Whelan
- Written by: Harriett Jay (play)
- Produced by: Herbert Wilcox; C. M. Woolf
- Starring: Nelson Keys; Miriam Seegar; Eric Bransby Williams; Lena Halliday
- Production company: British & Dominions Film Corporation
- Distributed by: Woolf & Freedman Film Service
- Release date: February 1929
- Running time: 7,213 feet
- Country: United Kingdom
- Languages: Silent; English intertitles

When Knights Were Bold is a 1929 British silent adventure film directed by Tim Whelan and starring Nelson Keys, Miriam Seegar and Eric Bransby Williams. It was adapted from the 1906 play When Knights Were Bold by Harriett Jay and made at Cricklewood Studios.

== Cast ==
- Nelson Keys as Sir Guy de Vere
- Miriam Seegar as Lady Rowena
- Eric Bransby Williams as Sir Brian Ballymore
- Wellington Briggs as Widdicombe
- Lena Halliday as Lady Walgrave
- Martin Adeson as Barker
- Hal Gordon as Whittle
- Edith Kingdon as Aunt Thornridge
- E. L. Frewyn as Dean

== Bibliography ==
- Low, Rachael. The History of British Film, Volume 4 1918-1929. Routledge, 1997. ISBN 978-1-136-20634-4.
