= William Barclay Squire =

British musicologist, librarian and librettist (1855 - 1927)

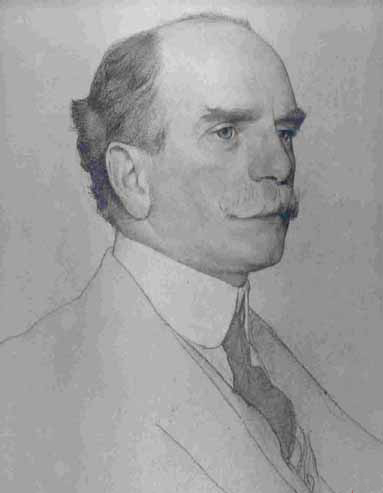
- Squire in 1904

William Barclay Squire (16 October 1855 – 13 January 1927) was a British musicologist, librarian, and librettist.

== Biography ==
William Barclay Squire was a devoted music enthusiast. He spent 35 years of his life (1885-1920) working for the British Museum, where he took charge of the collections of the music department and added many antiquarian publications to it. He was also music critic for The Saturday Review between 1888 and 1894.

Squire prepared the publishing of the Catalogue of Printed Music before 1801 (edited in 1912) and negotiated the deposit of the Royal Music Collection, for which he prepared the catalogue. He contributed numerous articles to the Encyclopædia Britannica of 1911, to the Dictionary of National Biography and to the Dictionary of Music and Musicians.

Occasionally, Squire acted as a librettist. His main work was the libretto for The Veiled Prophet, a Romantic Opera in 3 acts composed by Charles Villiers Stanford, adapted from the homonymous ballad in Thomas Moore's oriental romance Lalla Rookh, published 1890.

== See also ==
- Vienna Café
