= Florence Farr =

British actress, composer and director (1860–1917)

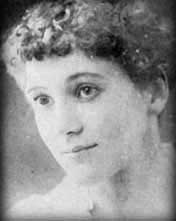
- Born: Florence Beatrice Farr; 7 July 1860; Bickley, Kent, UK
- Died: 29 April 1917 (aged 56); Colombo, Ceylon (Sri Lanka)
- Other name: Mary Lester

Florence Beatrice Emery (née Farr; 7 July 1860 – 29 April 1917) was a British West End leading actress, composer and director. She was also a women's rights activist, journalist, educator, singer, novelist, and leader of the occult order, the Hermetic Order of the Golden Dawn. She was a friend and collaborator of Nobel laureate William Butler Yeats, poet Ezra Pound, playwright Oscar Wilde, artists Aubrey Beardsley and Pamela Colman Smith, Masonic scholar Arthur Edward Waite, theatrical producer Annie Horniman, and many other literati of London's fin de siècle era, and even by their standards she was "the bohemian's bohemian". Though not as well known as some of her contemporaries and successors, Farr was a "first-wave" feminist of the late 19th and early 20th centuries; she publicly advocated for suffrage, workplace equality, and equal protection under the law for women, writing a book and many articles in intellectual journals on the rights of "the new woman".

== Early life ==
Florence Beatrice Farr was born in Bickley, Kent, England (nowadays a suburb of Greater London), in 1860, the youngest of the eight children of Mary Elizabeth Whittal and Dr. William Farr. She was named after nursing pioneer Florence Nightingale by her father, a physician and hygienist who was a friend and colleague of Nightingale's. Dr. Farr was known as an advocate of equal education and professional rights for women, who doubtlessly influenced his daughters' attitudes in their later lives.

"The Golden Stairs" by Burne-Jones

Her family sent her to school at Cheltenham Ladies' College in 1873. One of her childhood friends was May Morris, the daughter of Jane Morris, the renowned Pre-Raphaelite artist's model, who introduced her to the artistic and intellectual circles of London society. Farr, May Morris and other friends posed for Sir Edward Burne-Jones' Pre-Raphaelite painting "The Golden Stairs" when she was 19 years old. The painting is exhibited at the Tate Gallery in London. From 1877 to 1880, Farr attended Queen's College, the first women's college in England. After leaving college, she took a teaching position, but soon her aspirations turned to theatre.

== Theatrical career ==
Farr's first acting experience was in amateur productions with the Bedford Park Dramatics Club, in which her sister Henrietta and brother-in-law Henry were active members. Beginning in 1882, Farr served an eight-month apprenticeship under actor-manager J. L. Toole at Toole's Theatre in King William IV Street near Charing Cross. She adopted the stage name Mary Lester in deference to her father's wishes, who did not want the Farr name associated with the theatre. Her first professional stage appearance was as "Kate Renshaw", a schoolgirl, in Henry J. Byron's Uncle Dick’s Darling.

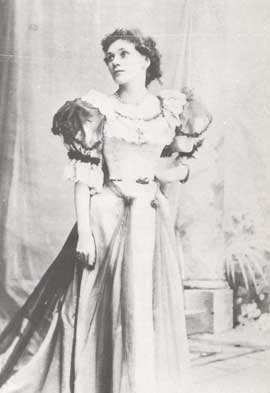
Farr at the Folly Theatre

In 1883 her father died, leaving her a modest inheritance to live on. She continued taking minor roles at the Folly, but changed her stage name back to Florence Farr when she began performing at the Gaiety Theatre in May. Her commanding presence and beautiful speaking voice were noted by George Bernard Shaw. She soon attained modest success on London's West End stages. In 1884 she married fellow actor Edward Emery. It turned out to be a disastrous marriage, and she chafed under the restrictions expected of a Victorian wife. In 1888, her husband left for an extended tour of America, and they never saw each other again. She eventually obtained a divorce in 1895 on the grounds of abandonment and never remarried.

In early 1890, Farr moved in with her sister, Henrietta, and brother-in-law, painter and stage designer Henry Marriott Paget, to Bedford Park, a bohemian London enclave of intellectuals, artists and writers. Bedford Park was known for its "free thinkers" and the "New Woman"(a term coined by Sarah Grand), where women participated in discussions on politics, art, literature and philosophy on an equal basis with men. An early feminist, Farr was known for advocating equality for women in politics, employment, and wages, among her intellectual circle of acquaintances. Yeats also lived in Bedford Park, and it's likely she first made his acquaintance when her brother-in-law was painting Yeats' portrait.

While in Bedford Park, Farr starred in the play A Sicilian Idyll: A Pastoral Play in Two Scenes by John Todhunter (an associate of Yeats and fellow member of the Golden Dawn) in the part of "Priestess Amaryllis", who summons the Goddess Selene to wreak revenge on her unfaithful lover. Shaw was in the audience to review the play, which he called "an hour's transparent Arcadian make-believe", but was greatly impressed with Farr's performance, as well as her "startling beauty, large expressive eyes, crescent eyebrows, and luminous smile."

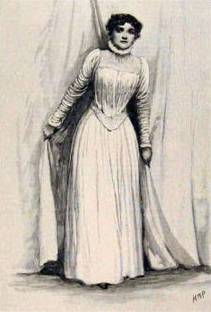
H. M. Paget's illustration of Florence Farr as Rebecca West in Ibsen's Rosmersholm

Shaw wished to mold her into his idealized vision of "The New Woman" and be the star of his plays. Shaw wrote that she reacted vehemently against Victorian sexual and domestic morality and was dauntless in publicly championing unpopular causes such as campaigning for the welfare of prostitutes. In a letter to Shaw she wrote, "…a race is likely to become degenerate so long as the sex question resolves itself ultimately into the question of how women can make the best bargain and, in so doing, deny themselves the liberty of free choice."

For Yeats she was, like Maud Gonne, a poetic muse, whose resonant voice was perfect for reciting his poetry. He found in her "a tranquil beauty like that of Demeter's image near the British Museum reading-room door, and an incomparable sense of rhythm and a beautiful voice, the seeming natural expression of the image." In his review of A Sicilian Idyll, Yeats wrote, "Mrs. Edward Emery (Florence Farr) …won universal praise with her striking beauty and subtle gesture and fine delivery of the verse. Indeed her acting was the feature of the whole performance that struck one most, after the verse itself. I do not know that I have any word too strong to express my admiration for its grace and power…I have never heard verse better spoken." Both men wrote leading parts in their plays for Farr, who used her influence with Annie Horniman to have them produced.

Farr was also the first woman in England to perform in Ibsen's plays, in particular the role of Rebecca West in the first English production of Rosmersholm, at the Vaudeville Theatre in 1891, which gained her critical acclaim. The character of Rebecca West is a 'New Woman' who rejects the ethical systems of Victorian Era Christianity, which for Florence Farr was a virtual typecast role.

== Producer and director ==
In 1893, Horniman anonymously financed Farr's first venture as a director, a series of plays at the Avenue Theatre on the Embankment. She commissioned her friend, artist Aubrey Beardsley, to create the poster for the season. Farr had starred as Blanche, a slumlord's daughter, in Shaw's first play, Widowers' Houses, and she approached both Shaw and Yeats to write plays for her production at the Avenue. Yeats delivered the short play The Land of Heart’s Desire, but Shaw had not finished his play in time for the series opening. A Comedy of Sighs by John Todhunter was quickly substituted, with Farr in the leading role, but the play was badly received and the entire venture was nearly a disaster.

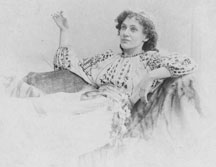
Production photograph of Farr for Shaw's Arms and the Man

After receiving a desperate cable from Farr, Shaw delivered his Arms and the Man. With only one week of rehearsal, Farr originated the supporting soubrette role of Louka, the vivacious and insolent servant girl who steals the affections of the hero from the play's lead ingenue, which Farr had conceded to the well-known actress Alma Murray. A bold satire of romantic idealism, the play was a great success with both audiences and critics, and still stands as one of Shaw's greatest works. But Farr was growing closer to Yeats (that they became lovers is speculated but not proven) and distancing herself from Shaw, so Arms was the last play by Shaw she ever performed in.

Throughout the 1890s, Yeats used Farr's "exquisite recitation" as part of his quest to encourage the rebirth of spoken poetry. In 1898, in Yeats' The Countess Cathleen, she played Aleel, a bard and seer who could see into the spirit realm, and sang all of her lines in verse while accompanying herself on the psaltery. Farr became a regular contributor to the performance of Yeats' metrical plays, and in 1898 he made her the stage manager for his Irish Literary Theatre. But during that same period of her life Farr was sidetracked from her theatrical career, much to the chagrin of Shaw ("...and now you think to undo the work of all these years by a phrase and a shilling's worth of esoteric Egyptology," he wrote her in 1896) by her involvement with Yeats in the secret occult society The Hermetic Order of the Golden Dawn.

== Golden Dawn ==
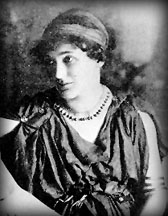
Farr as "Aleel" in Yeats' play The Countess Cathleen

The Golden Dawn is based on an initiated lodge system similar to that of Freemasonry; however women are admitted on an equal basis with men. Farr was initiated into the Isis-Urania Temple of the Order of the Golden Dawn in London by Yeats in July 1890 taking the magical motto Sapientia Sapienti Dona Data (Latin: "Wisdom is a gift given to the wise"). Annie Horniman was also a member of Isis-Urania Temple, which led to Farr's theatrical collaborations with her and Yeats. Farr became Praemonstratrix of the temple in 1894, taking charge of the educational system, and giving classes in tarot divination, scrying and Enochian magic. Spiritualism and Theosophy were very popular in the late Victorian Era but, unlike some of her contemporaries, Farr practiced magic, including the classic mystical techniques of invocation and evocation.

She published her first philosophical paper, A Short Inquiry concerning the Hermetic Art by a Lover of Philatethes in 1894 and wrote several of the Order's secret instruction papers, called the "Flying Rolls". With the resignation in 1897 of William Wynn Westcott, one of the co-founders of the Order, Farr replaced him as "Chief Adept in Anglia", becoming the leader of the English lodges, and the official representative of Samuel MacGregor-Mathers, the only remaining founder, who lived in Paris.

By the end of 1899, personal disputes arose within the Golden Dawn, which Farr described as an 'astral jar' between other senior members (Adepts), and a secret society within the Isis-Urania Lodge called The Sphere Group, created by Farr in 1896. There were also factions within the Order that resented a woman having authority as Chief Adept. Farr eventually believed that the temple should be closed down, writing to Mathers in January 1900 and offering her resignation as his representative, but that she was willing to carry on until a successor was found. Mathers' reply shocked and amazed her, for it claimed that Westcott had committed fraud and forged some of the foundational documents and charters of the Order. After waiting a few days she consulted with Yeats, and they jointly wrote to Westcott requesting an explanation of, and a reply to, Mathers' charges. Westcott denied the charges, and a seven-member committee of Adepts was formed to further investigate Mathers, asking for proof. Mathers sent a belligerent reply, refusing to produce proof, asserting his authority and dismissing Farr from her position as his representative on 23 March. The Adepts in London continued their investigation, and subsequently expelled Mathers in 1901. Farr, Yeats and Horniman (who returned after having been expelled earlier by Mathers) attempted to reorganize the Order, but met with limited success. Farr remained in her Chief Adept position for a time, but resigned in January 1902 in the wake of a fraud scandal concerning associates of Mathers that exposed the once secret society to public ridicule.

== Later life ==
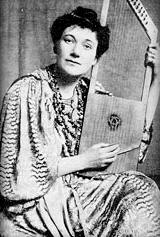
Farr with her psaltery harp in 1903

After Farr severed her association with the Golden Dawn she joined the Theosophical Society of London, and went on to write and produce (with Olivia Shakespear) two Egyptian-themed plays, The Shrine of the Golden Hawk and The Beloved of Hathor. Farr was also involved in the performance, direction and musical composition of a number of plays for the Lyceum, Court and New Century Theatres in London, between 1902 and 1906. She first worked with Gwendolen Bishop and Millicent Murby to establish the New Stage Club, which staged Shaw's The Philanderer and Oscar Wilde's Salome, both their first performances in England. This initiative continued with the Thomas Sturge Moore's Literary Theatre Society, again working with Gwendolen Bishop. In addition, besides collaborating with Yeats and his Abbey Theatre, Farr gave frequent performances of his poetry, which she set to the music of her psaltery. Farr toured in Great Britain, Europe and America in 1906 and 1907 to take the 'new art' of Irish literary theatre to wider audiences. While in America she met and collaborated with scenic painter and Tarot card artist Pamela Colman Smith, who worked as Farr's stage manager.

Farr also wrote regular articles during this time, particularly about women's rights, theatre and ancient Egyptian religion, in the British journal of art and politics, The New Age, and for Theosophical journals, some of which have been anthologized into books. In her essay "Our Evil Stars" (New Age, October 1907), Farr writes that reformation of public health and marriage laws are not enough to liberate women. "We must kill the force in us that says we cannot become all we desire, for that force is our evil star that turns all opportunity into grotesque failure....So let us each recognise the truth that our first business is to change ourselves, and then we shall know how to change our circumstances."

Farr lectured at the Leeds Arts Club, in 1906 with Yeats on the art of speaking to a psaltery and in 1908 on 'The Theatre and the Arts' where she talked about the practical considerations of designing and building a theatre, the history of Greek theatre and read poems by Yeats and Homer accompanied by the psaltery.

Through the Theosophical Society she had met Sir Ponnambalam Ramanathan, a spiritual teacher and future member of the Tamil parliament in Ceylon. Farr was greatly impressed by his plans for the education of young women in his native country, and she committed herself to helping him when he was ready.

In 1912, Farr learned that Ramanathan had established his Uduvil Ramanathan Girls College, and at the age of fifty-two, she sold all her possessions and moved to Ceylon, returning to her first vocation, that of a teacher. Farr was appointed Lady Principal by Ramanathan and the administration of the school was turned over to her. Certainly the organizational skills she learned as the Praemonstratrix of the Golden Dawn served Farr in her new position, and due to her tolerance and respect for the Tamil traditions, the school thrived under her administration. Farr also kept up her correspondences with Yeats, and sent him her translations of Tamil poetry.

Then in 1916, a lump in her breast was diagnosed as cancer, and she underwent a mastectomy. In Farr's final letter to Yeats, she included a humorous drawing of herself with her mastectomy scar, and wrote: "Last December I became an Amazon and my left breast and pectoral muscle were removed. Now my left side is a beautiful slab of flesh adorned with a handsome fern pattern made by a cut and 30 stitches." But the cancer had spread, and Florence Farr died a few months later at the age of 56 in a hospital in Colombo, in April 1917. In accordance with her wishes, her body was cremated and the ashes scattered by Ramanathan in the sacred Kalyaani River.

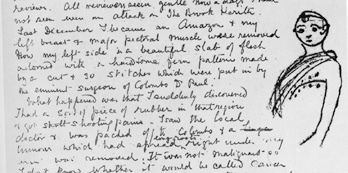
Farr's last letter to Yeats

In his poem "All Souls' Night", Yeats wrote:

On Florence Emery I call the next,
Who finding the first wrinkles on a face
Admired and beautiful,
And by the foreknowledge of the future vexed;
Diminished beauty, multiplied commonplace;
Preferred to teach a school
Away from neighbor or friend,
Among dark skins, permit foul years to wear
Hidden from eyesight to the unnoticed end.

== Works ==
- "The Mystery of Time: A Masque". Theosophical Review. 36 (211): 9–19. 1905.
- "A Dialogue of Vision". Theosophical Review. 39 (229): 77–84. 1906.
- "The Tetrad, or Structure of the Mind". Occult Review. 8 (1): 34–40. 1908.
- "Egyptian Use of Symbols". Occult Review. 7 (3): 46–149. 1908.
- "On the Kabalah". Occult Review. 7 (4): 213–218. 1908.
- "On the Play of the Image-Maker". Occult Review. 8 (2): 87–91. 1908.
- "The Philosophy Called Vedanta". Occult Review. 7 (6): 333–338. 1908.
- "The Rosicrucians and Alchemists". Occult Review. 7 (5): 259–264. 1908.
- The Music of Speech. London: Elkin Mathews. 1909. OCLC 11703141.
- Modern Woman: Her Intentions. Frank Palmer. 1910.
- The Solemnization of Jacklin: Some Adventures on the Search for Reality. London: A.C. Fifeld. 1912.
- Florence Farr (1993). Egyptian Magic: Occult Mysteries in Ancient Egypt. Kessinger. ISBN 978-1-56459-322-1.
- Florence Farr (December 1995). The Dancing Faun. Elkin Mathews. ISBN 978-1-872189-76-5.
- Darcy Kuntz, ed. (April 1996). The Enochian Experiments of the Golden Dawn. Golden Dawn Studies. Holmes. ISBN 978-1-55818-340-7.
- The Way of Wisdom: An Investigation of the Meanings of the Letters of the Hebrew Alphabet Considered As a Remnant of the Chaldean Wisdom. Holmes. 2001. ISBN 978-1-55818-290-5.
- Florence Farr (2001). Darcy Küntz (ed.). The Magic of a Symbol. Holmes. ISBN 978-1-55818-337-7.
- Florence Farr; Olivia Shakespear (September 2002). The Serpent's Path: The Magical Plays of Florence Farr. Holmes. ISBN 978-1-55818-414-5.
- Florence Farr (March 2005). La Magia Egipcia (in Spanish). Obelisco. ISBN 978-84-7720-911-9.
- The Book of the Grand Words of Each Mystery in Egyptian Magic. Kessinger. 2005. ISBN 978-1-4253-0233-7.
- The Gnostic Magic of Egypt. Kessinger. 2005. ISBN 978-1-4253-0232-0.
- The Legend of Ra and Isis. Kessinger. 2005. ISBN 978-1-4253-0231-3.
- Florence Farr (2022) The Egyptian Rituals Holythorn Press ISBN 9781838445317
