= When Knights Were Bold (1936 film) =

- DVD cover with artwork from original Swedish poster
- Directed by: Jack Raymond
- Written by: Harriett Jay (play); Douglas Furber; Austin Parker
- Produced by: Max Schach; C.M. Woolf
- Starring: Jack Buchanan; Fay Wray; Garry Marsh
- Cinematography: Freddie Young
- Edited by: Frederick Wilson
- Music by: Harry Perritt
- Production company: Capitol Film Corporation
- Distributed by: General Film Distributors
- Release date: 19 February 1936
- Running time: 76 minutes
- Country: United Kingdom
- Language: English

When Knights Were Bold is a 1936 British musical comedy film directed by Jack Raymond and starring Jack Buchanan, Fay Wray and Garry Marsh. It was written by Douglas Furber and Austin Parker based on the 1906 play of the same title by Charles Marlowe (as Harriett Jay).

Songs include "Let's Put the People To Work" and "I'm Still Dreaming" sung by Jack Buchanan, and "Onward We Go" sung by Buchanan & soldiers' chorus.

== Plot ==
Sir Guy de Vere inherits his father's estate while serving with the British army in India. He returns home to take up his new role, but is greeted with hostility by his family and servants. After a drunken evening, a bump on the head with a suit of armour sends Sir Guy back to the 1400s and the golden age of chivalry.

== Cast ==
- Jack Buchanan as Sir Guy De Vere
- Fay Wray as Lady Rowena
- Garry Marsh as Brian Ballymoat
- Kate Cutler as Aunt Agatha
- Martita Hunt as Aunt Esther
- Robert Horton as Cousin Bertie
- Aubrey Mather as The Canon
- Aubrey Fitzgerald as Barker, butler
- Robert Nainby as Whittle, the 'boy'
- Moore Marriott as the tramp
- Charles Paton as The Mayor
- Michael Wilding as soldier (uncredited)
- Terry-Thomas as soldier (uncredited)

== Production ==
The film was made at British and Dominions Elstree Studios by the independent Capitol Film production company. The film's sets were designed by the art director Wilfred Arnold. Some scenes were shot on location at Warwick Castle.

== Critical reception ==
The Monthly Film Bulletin wrote: "The production is not only on a lavish scale; it is highly polished and finished. The settings are varied and elaborate and the photography and lighting are excellent. Jack Buchanan is on the screen practically the whole time, and shows how very versatile he is."

In 1936, The Daily Express wrote, "In spite of its laudable effort to put more action into a fairly static play, the film script is a rare triumph of unimaginativeness."

Bosley Crowther in The New York Times wrote: "It is, to state it briefly, a pointless trifle, a minor vaudeville skit... If the Little Carnegie is anxious to show none but British product, why doesn’t it play in revival some really memorable films? ... Why expose a blunder which had better be forgot?"

TV Guide noted, "It seems that the best British farces come from mocking that land's rather stuffy customs. This picture takes that course and provides pleasing comedy by not taking itself seriously."
