= Ballad of the Goodly Fere =

Poem by Ezra Pound

The Ballad of the Goodly Fere is a poem by Ezra Pound, first published in 1909. The narrator is Simon Zelotes, speaking after the Crucifixion about his memories of Jesus (the "goodly fere"—Old English for "companion"—of the title).

Pound wrote the poem as a direct response to what he considered inappropriately effeminate portrayals of Jesus, comparing Jesus—a "man o' men"—to "capon priest(s)"; he subsequently told T.P.'s Weekly that he had "been made very angry by a certain sort of cheap irreverence".

== Critical response ==
Charles Elkin Mathews expressed his concerns that readers would find Fere's humanization of Jesus offensive.

Edward Marsh sought permission to reprint Fere, which Pound denied because he wished to reprint it himself.

T. S. Eliot said that Fere showed Pound's "great knowledge of the ballad form".

William Butler Yeats said that Fere "will last".

Ambrose Bierce is said to have "consistently disapproved" the poems of a "young poet", until one came to him which impressed him so much he wore "out the paper and the patience of friends by reading it at them", namely Fere.
