= When Knights Were Bold (1916 British film) =

1916 film by Maurice Elvey

When Knights Were Bold is a 1916 British silent comedy film directed by Maurice Elvey and starring James Welch, with Gerald Ames, Marjorie Day and Gwynne Herbert. It was based on the 1906 play When Knights Were Bold by Harriett Jay.

Kinematograph Weekly printed this synopsis of the film:

Sir Guy de Vere, last of a long line of de Veres, and owner of a romantic castle, is in love with the Lady Rowena, a romantic-minded lady, who rejects his suit because she wishes her husband to be a man in whom all the glories of the past still live, and Sir Guy is a very modern young man. Isaac Issacson, a wealthy Jew, desires to secure Sir Guy as a husband for his daughter Sara, and bribes the hard-up Sir Brian Ballymore to get him an introduction. The three get an invitation to Beechwood Castle, and to remove Rowena as a rival to Sara, Sir Brian makes love to her. Sir Guy, meanwhile, has been out shooting and comes home with a dreadful cold, so when the guests go in to dinner, he is reclining with his feet in a mustard bath, with dressing gown and slippers, before a blazing fire in the hall, with plenty of hot whiskey at his side. Presently he falls asleep and dreams of the good old times" when knights were bold." His dream is depicted on the screen, and knights in shining armour and ladies clad in the costumes of centuries ago appear before our gaze. They are all his present-day friends and servants, but with manners, speech and dress of the olden times. He sees himself as master of Beechwood in the mediaeval days, and to the castle comes Lady Rowena, who has been attacked by the wicked Sir Brian. She claims his protection and urges him to buckle on his armour and go forth and slay Sir Brian, and after many exciting and amusing incidents, Sir Guy takes off his armour atid goes for the fully-mailed Sir Brian with his fists, administering a knock-out blow, and standing as a conqueror with one foot on his fallen foe, he—wakes up I A Taste of the Good Old Times. Remembering his dream; and that his guests are still at dinner, he decides to give Lady Rowena her fill of " the good old times." So, taking a large two-handed sword, he commences to order the servants about in the mediaeval language of his dream, and to woo Rowena in a fiercely romantic style which she resents. His valet and a friend are later taken lido the plot, and when Sir Guy hears that Sir Brian has been making love to Rowena, he gives him the time of his life, and the audience a series of hearty laughs. His treatment of that gentleman is anything but gentle. Chased upstairs, downstairs and on the roof-tops, Sir Brian seeks refuge down a chimney, from which the surprised guests presently see a grimy and dishevelled figure appear. He is eventually kicked out, and Sir Guy gives up his little joke, and becomes engaged at last to Rowena, who now declares that she prefers the present day to" the good old times, when knights were bold." It is impossible to give an adequate description of the endless comedy stuations; they must be seen. to be appreciated, and exhibitors who have not already done so should make a point of seeing this excellent British comedy.

== Cast ==
- James Welch - Sir Guy de Vere
- Gerald Ames - Sir Brian Ballymore
- Marjorie Day - Maid
- Gwynne Herbert - Isaacson
- Philip Hewland - Barker
- Hayford Hobbs - Widdicombe
- Edna Maude - Aunt Thornridge
- Janet Ross - Lady Rowena
- Bert Wynne - Whittle
