= When Knights Were Bold (play) =

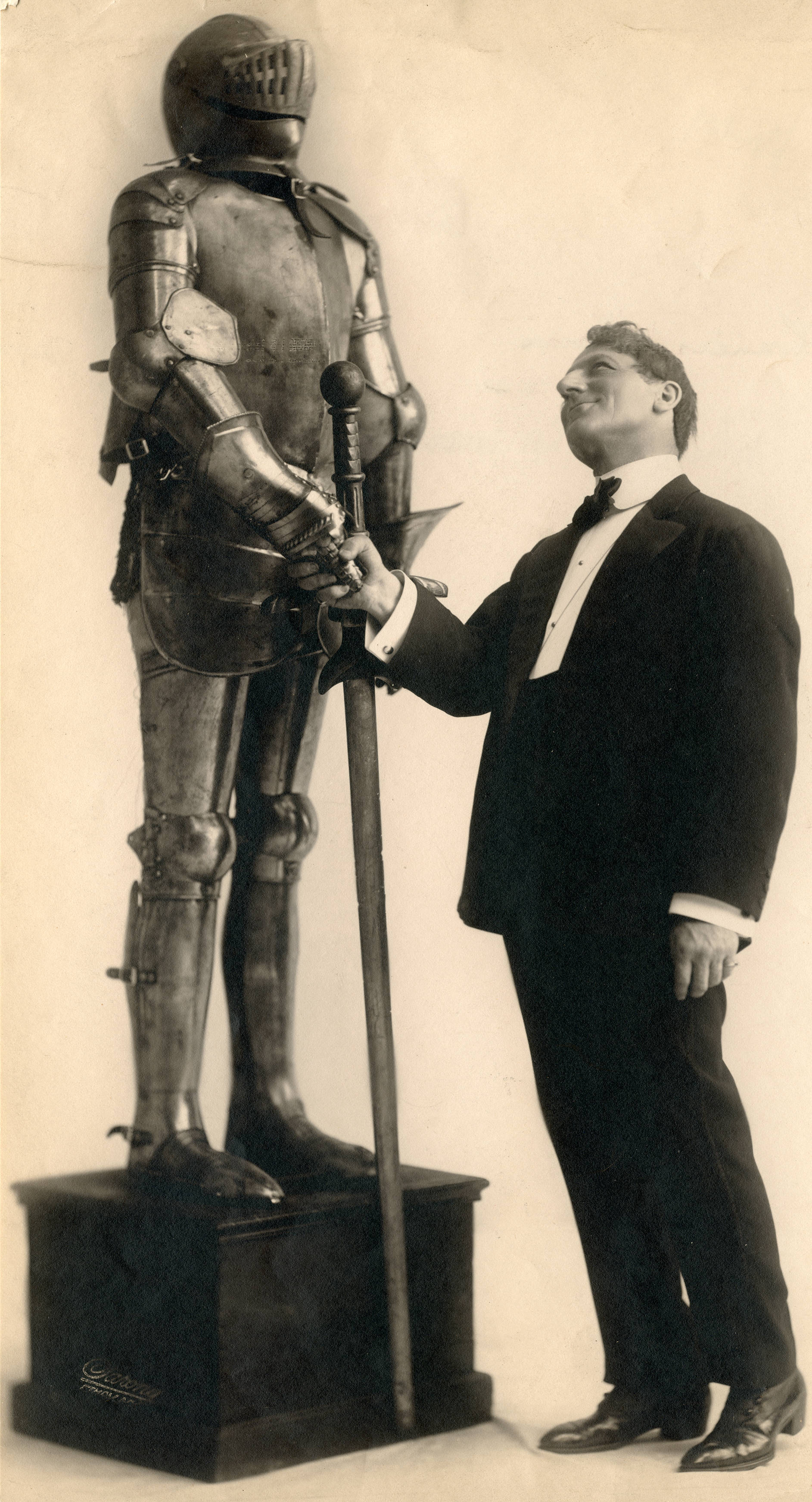
A scene from Act I of the play, at the Moore Theater, Seattle.

When Knights Were Bold is a comedy play by the British writer Harriett Jay writing under the pseudonym of Charles Marlowe which was first performed in 1906. A British officer Guy De Vere returns home from service in India after inheriting an estate and a baronetcy in the village of Little Twittering where he encounters a number of eccentrics. His cousin Rowena, meanwhile, falls madly in love with him. It should not be confused with the 1898 novel When Knighthood Was in Flower by Charles Major which is sometimes known by this title.

== Film adaptations ==
The play has been adapted into films on four occasions. The first was a 1908 Biograph short with D. W. Griffith appearing in an acting role. In 1916 a silent British film When Knights Were Bold was made by Maurice Elvey. The same year an Italian adaptation When Knights Were Bold was released by the Turin-based Aquila Films. In 1929 a third silent film When Knights Were Bold was made by Tim Whelan. In 1936 a sound version When Knights Were Bold was made by Jack Raymond and starred Jack Buchanan.

== Bibliography ==
- Nicoll, Alardyce. English Drama, 1900-1930: The Beginnings of the Modern Period. Cambridge University Press, 1973.
