= Thomas Sturge Moore =

British poet, author and artist

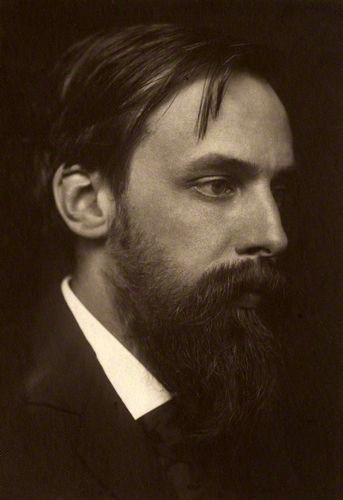
- Thomas Sturge Moore by George Charles Beresford, 1903
- Born: 4 March 1870; 3 Wellington Square, Hastings, East Sussex, England
- Died: 18 July 1944 (aged 74); St Andrews Cottage, Clewer, Windsor, Berkshire, England
- Resting place: Ashes scattered near Petersfield, Hampshire
- Education: Dulwich College; Croydon School of Art; Lambeth School of Art
- Occupations: Poet, writer and artist
- Spouse: Marie Appia (1872–1956)
- Children: 2
- Relatives: George Moore (grandfather); G. E. Moore (brother); Nicholas Moore (nephew)
- Writing career
- Genres: Georgian Poetry; Noh drama Art Nouveau; Art Deco

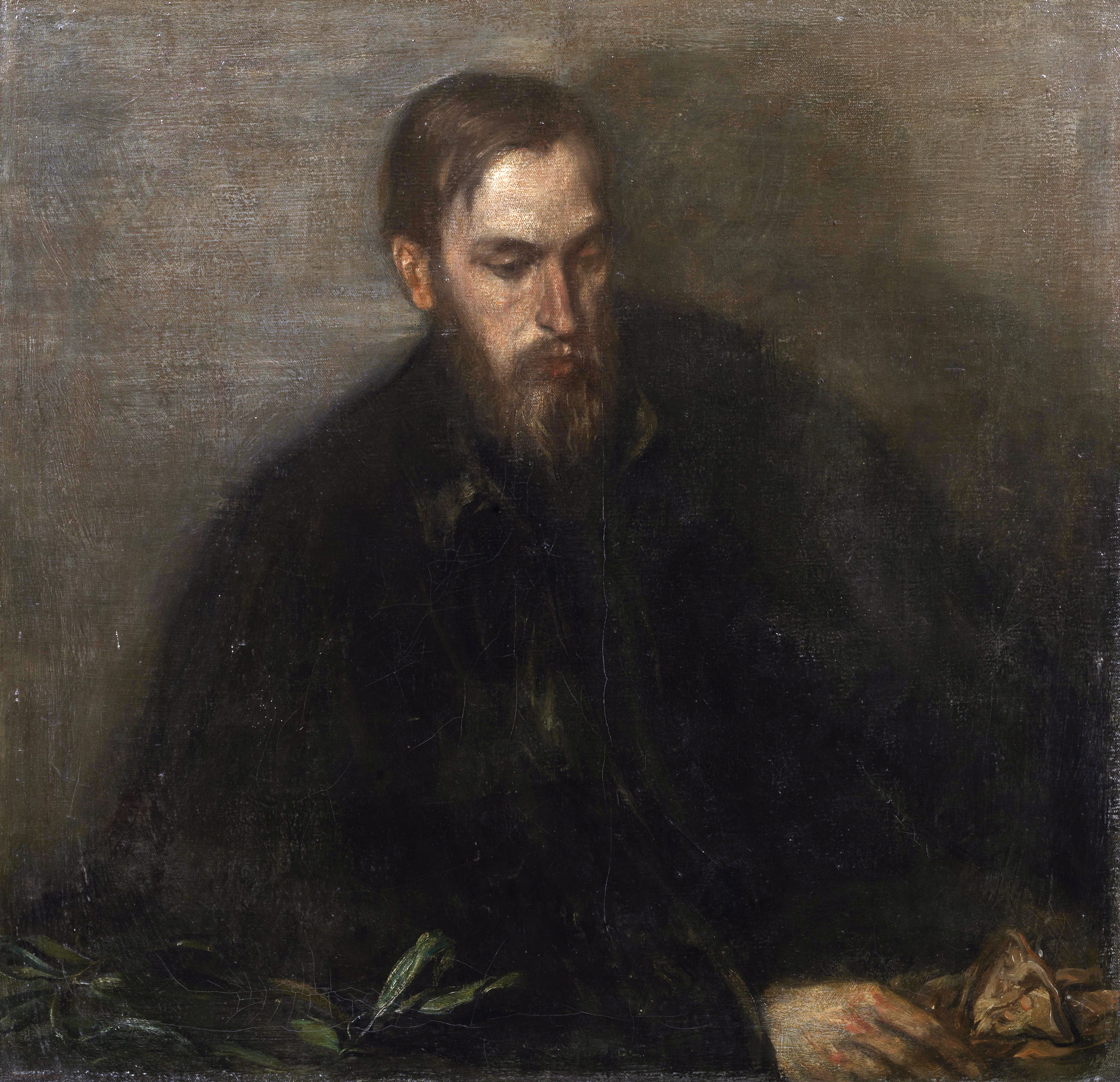
Thomas Sturge Moore, portrait by Charles Shannon, c. 1897, a.k.a. The Man with a Yellow Glove

Thomas Sturge Moore (4 March 1870 – 18 July 1944) was a British poet, author and artist.

== Biography ==
Sturge Moore was born at 3 Wellington Square, Hastings, East Sussex, on 4 March 1870 and educated at Dulwich College, the Croydon School of Art and Lambeth School of Art. In Lambeth he studied under the wood-engraver Charles Roberts. He was a long-term friend and correspondent of W. B. Yeats, who was to describe him as "one of the most exquisite poets writing in England". He was also a playwright, writing a Medea influenced by Yeats' drama and the Japanese Noh style. As a wood-engraver and artist he designed the covers for poetry editions of Yeats and others, as well as illustrating books for the Vale Press of Charles Ricketts. He was a prolific poet and his subjects included morality, art and the spirit writing in a 'severely classical tone', according to poet/critic Yvor Winters. His first pamphlet, Two Poems, was printed privately in 1893 and his first book of verse, The Vinedresser, was published in 1899. His love for poetry led him to become an active member of the Poetry Recital Society.

In 1901, Moore, with Yeats, Laurence Binyon, Charles Ricketts, and Ethel and Sybil Pye, formed the Literary Theatre Club. Moore's first (of 31) play to be produced, a copyright reading of Aphrodite against Artemis, was the first production staged by the club, at the Dalston Theatre on 30 July 1901. Yeats described the play as "powerful with a beautiful constrained passion."

In 1913 Moore nominated Rabindranath Tagore the Indian poet for the Nobel Prize in literature.

Moore received a civil list pension of £75 per annum in 1920 in recognition of his contribution to literature. In 1930 he was nominated as one of seven candidates for the position of Poet Laureate. He suffered from chronic ill health, suffering a series of heart attacks in 1942 and 1943, and died on 18 July 1944 at a convalescent home, St Andrews Cottage in Clewer, Windsor, Berkshire, from a kidney infection following a prostate operation.

He was cremated at Woking. His ashes were scattered near Petersfield in August 1953.

== Family ==
Sturge Moore adopted the use of his middle name 'Sturge' (his mother's family name) as a way of avoiding confusion with the poet Thomas Moore.

On 26 November 1903 Moore married Marie Appia, niece of Louis Appia, a founder of the International Committee of the Red Cross, and cousin of the Swiss stage designer Adolphe Appia. They had two children: Daniel Sturge-Moore, journalist and broadcaster; and Henriette Sturge-Moore (1907–1995), prominent theatre designer, teacher and interior decorator.

Moore was the brother of the Bloomsbury philosopher George Edward Moore, one of the founders of the Analytic tradition in philosophy, and uncle of Nicholas Moore, New Apocalyptics poet of the 1940s, and of the composer Timothy Moore.

== Works ==
- Two Poems, 1893
- The Vinedresser and Other Poems, 1899
- The Centaur and the Bacchant. From the French by Maurice de Guerin, 1899
- Altdorfer, 1900
- Aphrodite Against Artemis, 1901 (play)
- Absalom, 1903 (poems)
- Danäe, 1903 (poems)
- Durer, 1904
- The Little School, 1905 (poems)
- Poems, 1906
- Correggio, 1906
- A Florentine Tragedy, 1908 (adaptation of Oscar Wilde's play)
- Art and Life (Flaubert and Blake), 1910
- Mariamne, 1911 (play)
- A Sicilian Idyll and Judith: A Conflict, 1911 (plays)
- The Sea is Kind, 1914 (collection of 69 poems)
- The Wilderness, 1915 (poetic drama)
- Medea, 1920 (play)
- Tragic Mothers: Medea, Niobe, Tyrfing, 1920 (play)
- Judas, 1923
- Mystery and Tragedy: Two Dramatic Poems, 1930 (plays)
- Nine Poems, 1930
- Wind's Work (poem)

== See also ==
- Vienna Café
