= Harriett Jay =

British writer and playwright (1853–1932)

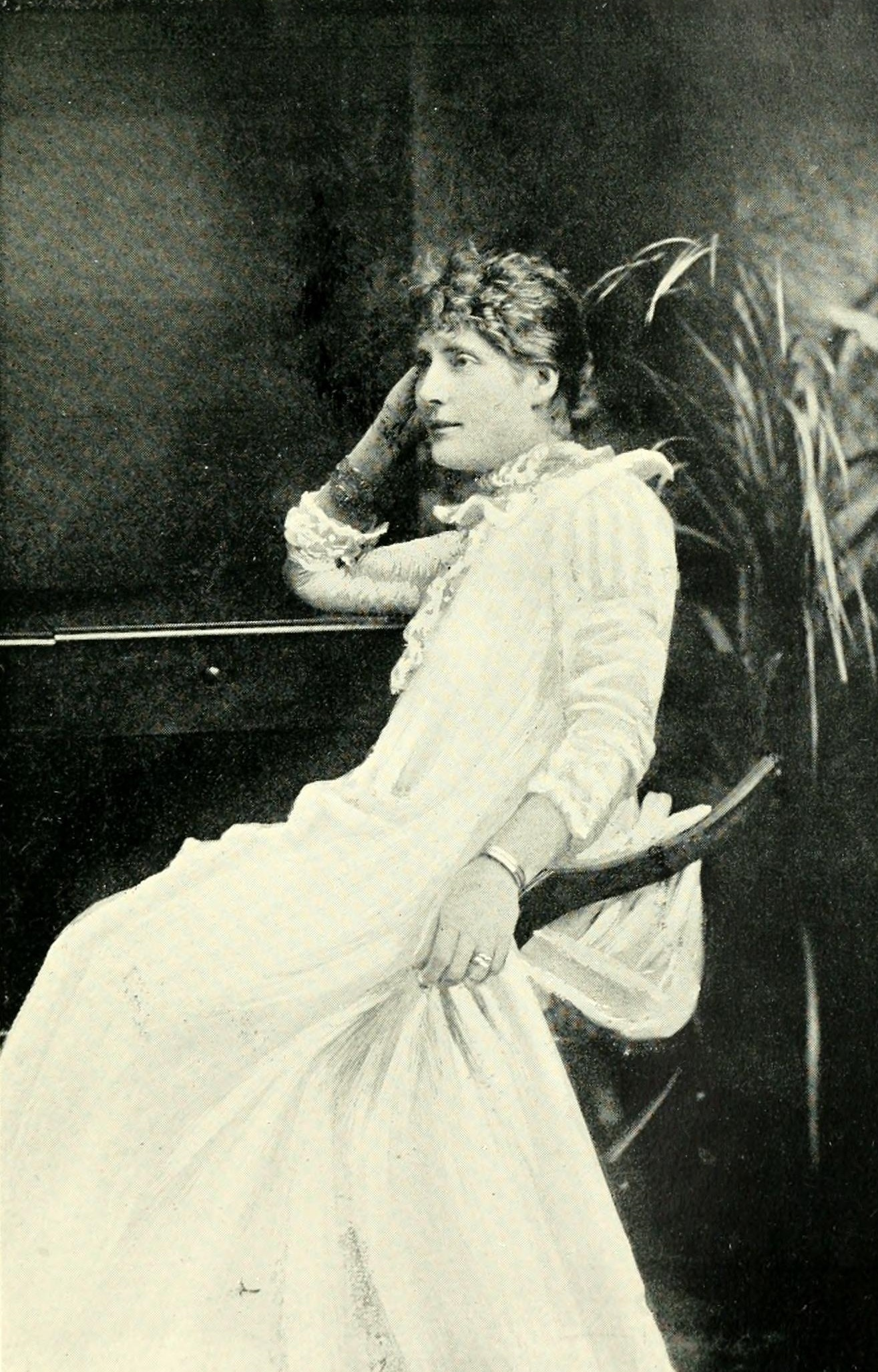
Harriett Jay.

Harriett Jay (2 September 1853 – 21 December 1932) was a British writer and playwright who often wrote under the pseudonym of Charles Marlowe. Several of her plays were turned into films. She is best known for her 1906 comedy play When Knights Were Bold.

== Selected plays ==
- Alone in London (1892)
- When Knights Were Bold (1906)

== Bibliography ==
- Nicoll, Alardyce (1973). English Drama, 1900–1930: The Beginnings of the Modern Period. Cambridge University Press.
