= List of works by George Bernard Shaw =

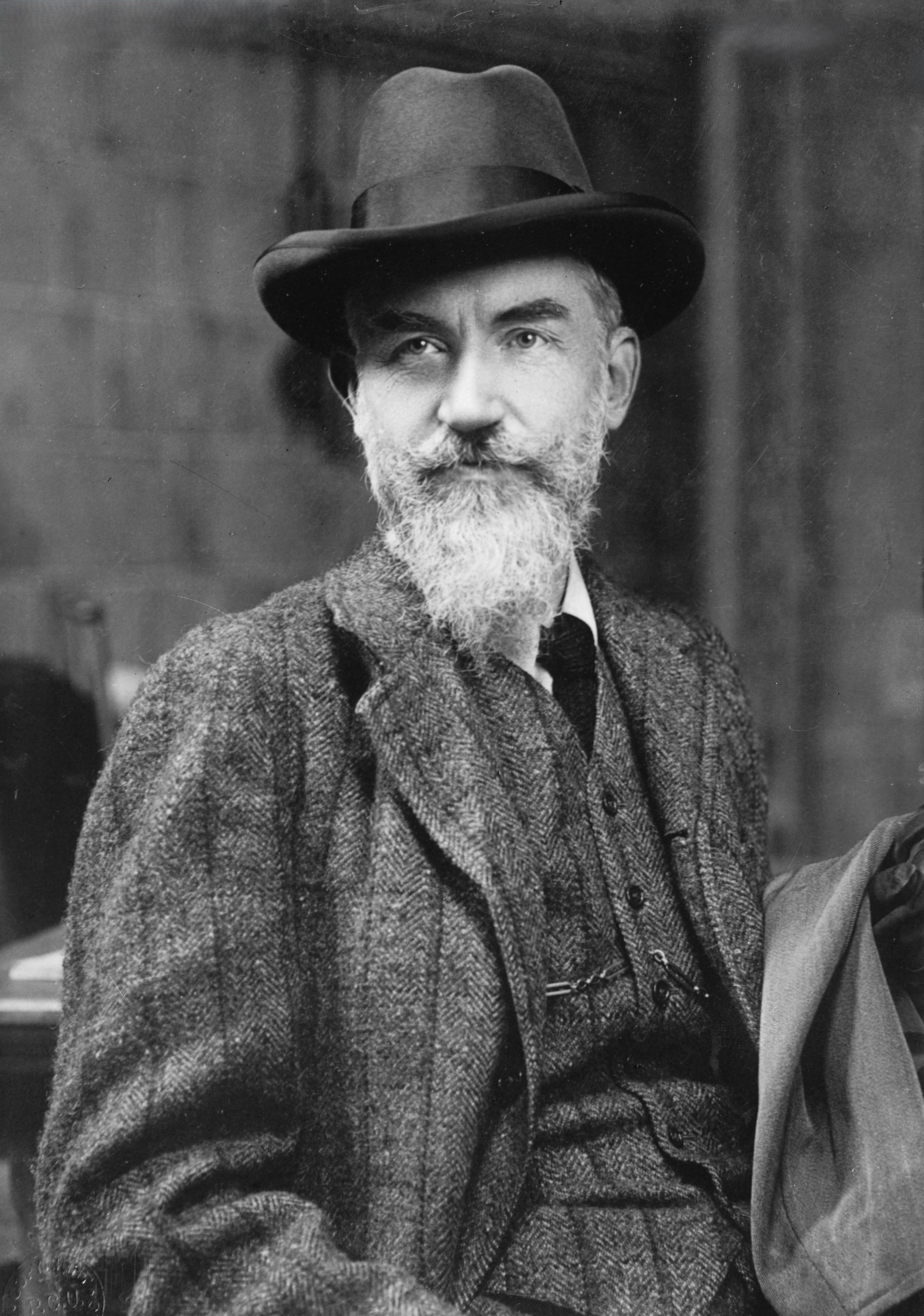
Bernard Shaw in 1909

The following is a list of works by George Bernard Shaw. The first section shows works in chronological sequence as written, the second tabulates these works by genre. In addition to the works listed here, Shaw produced a large quantity of journalism and criticism, particularly in his role as a music and theatre critic. These items are not included in the lists, except for the collections which Shaw himself supervised and which were published during his lifetime; these appear in the brief third section. Other collections of Shaw's journalism and correspondence, and editions of his plays, have been published since his death but again are not listed here.

The main source is the chronology provided by the International Shaw Society. Items not covered by the chronology are separately cited. Items marked ‡ are works published anonymously by or for the Fabian Society, where Shaw's authorship was later confirmed by the Society. Except where indicated, the publication year is that of first publication.

== Chronological list ==
Date written	Title	Year first performed (plays)	Year of publication
1878	The Legg Papers (abandoned draft of novel)		unpublished
1878	"My Dear Dorothea..."		1906
1878	Passion Play (fragment)		1971
1879	Immaturity (novel)		1930
1880	The Irrational Knot (novel)		serial 1885–7; book 1905
1881	Love Among the Artists (novel)		serial 1887–8; book 1900
1882	Cashel Byron's Profession (novel)		serial 1885–6; book 1886; rev 1889, 1901
1883	An Unsocial Socialist (novel)		serial 1884; book 1887
1884	"A Manifesto" (Fabian tract 2)‡		1884
1884	Un Petit Drame (playlet)		1959
1884–92	Widowers' Houses (play)	1893	1893; rev. 1898
1885	"The Miraculous Revenge" (short story)		1906 (Note: Published in W.B. Yeats's Irish miscellany The Shanachie, 1906)
1885	To provident landlords and capitalists (Fabian tract 3)‡		1885
1887	The true radical programme (Fabian tract 6: Shaw a contributor)‡		1887
1887–88	An Unfinished Novel (novel fragment)		1958
1889	Fabian Essays in Socialism (ed. Shaw with 2 Shaw essays)		1889; rev. 1908, 1931, 1948
1890	What socialism is (Fabian tract 13)‡		1890
1890	"Ibsen" (Lecture before the Fabian Society)		1970
1891	The Quintessence of Ibsenism (criticism)		1891; rev. 1913
1892	Fabian election manifesto (Fabian tract 40)‡		1892
1892	The Fabian Society: what it has done, and how it has done it (Fabian tract 42)‡		1892 rev. 1899
1892	"Vote! Vote!! Vote!!!" (Fabian Tract 43)‡		1892
1893	The Impossibilities of Anarchism (Fabian tract 45)‡		1892
1893	The Philanderer (play)	1905	1898
1893	Mrs. Warren's Profession (play)	1902	1898, rev. 1930
1893–94	Arms and the Man (play)	1894	1898, rev. 1930
1894	A Plan of Campaign for Labor (incorporating "To Your Tents, O Israel") (Fabian tract 49)‡		1894
1894	Candida (play)	1897	1898, rev. 1930
1895	The Man of Destiny (play)	1897	1898, rev. 1930
1895	The Sanity of Art (art criticism)		1895, rev. 1908
1895–96	You Never Can Tell (play)	1899	1898, rev. 1930
1896	Fabian report and resolutions to the IS and TU Congress (Fabian tract 70)‡		1896
1896	The Devil's Disciple (play)	1897	1901, rev. 1904
1898	The Perfect Wagnerite (music criticism)		1898, rev. 1907
1898	Caesar and Cleopatra (play)	1901	1901, rev. 1930
1899	Captain Brassbound's Conversion (play)	1900	1901
1900	Fabianism and The Empire: A Manifesto (ed. Shaw)		1900
1900	Women as councillors (Fabian tract 93)‡		1900
1901	Socialism for millionaires (Fabian tract 107)‡ )		1901
1901	The Admirable Bashville (play)	1902	1901
1901–02	Man and Superman incorporating Don Juan in Hell (play)	1905	1903; rev. 1930
1904	Fabianism and the fiscal question (Fabian tract 116)‡		1904
1904	John Bull's Other Island (play)	1904	1907; rev. 1930
1904	How He Lied to Her Husband (play)	1904	1907
1904	The Common Sense of Municipal Trading (social commentary)		1908
1905	Major Barbara (play)	1905	1907; rev. 1930, 1945
1905	Passion, Poison, and Petrifaction (play)	1905	1905
1906	The Doctor's Dilemma (play)	1906	1911
1907	The Interlude at the Playhouse (playlet)	1907	1927
1907–08	Getting Married (play)	1908	1911
1907–08	Brieux: A Preface (criticism)		1910
1909	The Shewing-Up of Blanco Posnet (play)	1909	1911; rev. 1930
1909	Press Cuttings (play)	1909	1909
1909	The Glimpse of Reality (play)	1927	1926
1909	The Fascinating Foundling (play)	1928	1926
1909	Misalliance (play)	1910	1914; rev. 1930
1910	Socialism and superior brains: a reply to Mr. Mallock (Fabian tract 146)		1926
1910	The Dark Lady of the Sonnets (play)	1910	1914
1910–11	Fanny's First Play (play)	1911	1914;
1912	Androcles and the Lion (play)	1913	1916
1912	Overruled (play)	1912	1916
1912	Pygmalion (play)	1913	1916; rev. 1941
1913	Beauty's Duty (playlet)		1932
1913	Great Catherine: Whom Glory Still Adores (play)	1913	1919
1913–14	The Music-Cure (play)	1914	1926
1914	Common Sense about The War (political commentary)		1914
1914	The Case for Belgium (pamphlet)		1914
1915	The Inca of Perusalem (play)	1916	1919
1915	O'Flaherty V.C. (play)	1917	1919
1915	More Common Sense about The War (political commentary)		unpublished
1916	Augustus Does His Bit (play)	1917	1919
1916–17	Heartbreak House (play)	1920	1919
1917	Doctors’ Delusions; Crude Criminology; Sham Education (compilation)		1931
1917	Annajanska, the Bolshevik Empress (play)	1918	1919
1917	How To Settle The Irish Question (political commentary)		1917
1917	What I Really Wrote about The War (political commentary)		1931
1918–20	Back to Methuselah (play)	1922	1921; rev. 1930, 1945
1919	Peace Conference Hints (political commentary)		1919
1919	Ruskin's Politics (lecture of 21 November 1919)		1921
1920–21	Jitta's Atonement (play, adapted from the German)	1923	1926
1923	Saint Joan (play)	1923	1924
1925	Imprisonment (social commentary)		1925; rev. 1946 as The Crime of Imprisonment
1928	The Intelligent Woman's Guide to Socialism and Capitalism		1928; rev. 1937
1928	The Apple Cart (play)	1929	1930
1929	The League of Nations (political commentary)		1929
1930	Socialism: Principles and Outlook, and Fabianism (Fabian tract 233)		1929
1931	Pen Portraits and Reviews (criticism)		1931
1931–34	The Millionairess (play)	1936	1936
1932	The Adventures of the Black Girl in Her Search for God (story)		1932
1932	Essays in Fabian Socialism (reprinted tracts with 2 new essays)		1932
1932	The Rationalization of Russia (political commentary)		1964
1933	The Future of Political Science in America (political commentary)		1933
1933	Village Wooing (play)	1934	1934
1933	On The Rocks (play)	1933	1934
1934	The Simpleton of the Unexpected Isles (play)	1935	1936
1934	The Six of Calais (play)	1934	1936
1934	Short Stories, Scraps, and Shavings (stories & playlets)	1934	1934
1936	Arthur and the Acetone (playlet)	1936	1936
1936	Cymbeline Refinished (play)	1937	1938
1936	Geneva (play)	1938	1939; rev. 1939, 1940, 1946, 1947
1936–47	Buoyant Billions (play)	1948	1949
1937–38	Pygmalion (film screenplay, with co-writers)	1938	1941
1938–39	In Good King Charles's Golden Days (play)	1939	1939; rev. 1947
1939	Shaw Gives Himself Away: An Autobiographical Miscellany		1939
1944	Everybody’s Political What's What (political commentary)		1944
1948	Farfetched Fables (play)	1950	1951
1948	The RADA Graduates' Keeepsake and Counsellor (RADA handbook)		1948
1949	Sixteen Self Sketches (revision of Shaw Gives Himself Away)		1949
1949	Shakes versus Shav (puppet play)	1949	1950
1950	Why She Would Not (play)	1957	1960
1950	Rhyming Picture Guide to Ayot Saint Lawrence		1950

== Works listed by genre ==
=== Dramatic works ===
Date written	Title	Year first performed	Year of publication
1878	Passion Play: A Dramatic Fragment	unperformed	
1884	Un Petit Drame	unperformed	
1884–92	Widowers' Houses	1893	1893; rev. 1898
1893	The Philanderer	1905	1898
1893	Mrs. Warren's Profession	1902	1898, rev. 1930
1893–94	Arms and the Man	1894	1898, rev. 1930
1894	Candida	1897	1898, rev. 1930
1895	The Man of Destiny	1897	1898, rev. 1930
1895–96	You Never Can Tell	1899	1898, rev. 1930
1896	The Devil's Disciple	1897	1901, rev. 1904
1898	Caesar and Cleopatra	1901	1901, rev. 1930
1899	Captain Brassbound's Conversion	1900	1901
1901	The Admirable Bashville	1902	1901
1901–02	Man and Superman incorporating Don Juan in Hell	1905	1930
1904	John Bull's Other Island	1904	1907; rev. 1930
1904	How He Lied to Her Husband	1904	1907
1905	Major Barbara (play)	1905	1907; rev. 1930, 1945
1905	Passion, Poison, and Petrifaction	1905	1905
1906	The Doctor's Dilemma	1906	1911
1907	The Interlude at the Playhouse (playlet)	1907	1927
1907–08	Getting Married	1908	1911
1909	The Shewing-Up of Blanco Posnet	1909	1911; rev. 1930
1909	Press Cuttings	1909	1909
1909	The Glimpse of Reality	1927	1926
1909	The Fascinating Foundling	1928	1926
1909	Misalliance	1910	1914; rev. 1930
1910	The Dark Lady of the Sonnets	1910	1914
1910–11	Fanny's First Play	1911	1914;
1912	Androcles and the Lion	1913	1916
1912	Overruled	1912	1916
1912	Pygmalion	1913	1916; rev. 1941
1913	Beauty's Duty (playlet)	unperformed	1932
1913	Great Catherine: Whom Glory Still Adores	1913	1919
1913–14	The Music-Cure	1914	1926
1915	The Inca of Perusalem	1916	1919
1915	O'Flaherty V.C.	1917	1919
1916	Augustus Does His Bit	1917	1919
1916–17	Heartbreak House	1920	1919
1917	Annajanska, the Bolshevik Empress	1918	1919
1918–20	Back to Methuselah	1922	1921; rev. 1930, 1945
1920–21	Jitta's Atonement (adapted from the German)	1923	1926
1923	Saint Joan	1923	1924
1928	The Apple Cart	1929	1930
1931–34	The Millionairess	1936	1936
1933	Village Wooing	1934	1934
1933	On The Rocks	1933	1934
1934	The Simpleton of the Unexpected Isles	1935	1936
1934	The Six of Calais	1934	1936
1936	Arthur and the Acetone (playlet)	1936	1936
1936	Cymbeline Refinished	1937	1938
1936	Geneva	1938	1939; rev. 1939, 1940, 1946, 1947
1936–47	Buoyant Billions	1948	1949
1937–38	Pygmalion (film screenplay, with co-writers)	1938	1941
1938–39	In Good King Charles's Golden Days	1939	1939; rev. 1947
1948	Farfetched Fables	1950	1951
1949	Shakes versus Shav (puppet play)	1949	1950
1950	Why She Would Not	1957	1960

=== Political writings ===
Date written	Title	Year of publication
1884	"A Manifesto" (Fabian tract 2)‡	1884
1885	To provident landlords and capitalists (Fabian tract 3)‡	1885
1887	The true radical programme (Fabian tract 6: Shaw a contributor)‡	1887
1889	Fabian Essays in Socialism (ed. Shaw with 2 Shaw essays)	1889; rev. 1908, 1931, 1948
1890	What socialism is (Fabian tract 13)‡	1890
1892	Fabian election manifesto (Fabian tract 40)‡	1892
1892	The Fabian Society: what it has done, and how it has done it (Fabian tract 42)‡	1892 rev. 1899
1892	"Vote! Vote!! Vote!!!" (Fabian Tract 43)‡	1892
1893	The Impossibilities of Anarchism (Fabian tract 45)‡	1892
1894	A Plan of Campaign for Labor (incorporating "To Your Tents, O Israel") (Fabian tract 49)‡	1894
1896	Fabian report and resolutions to the IS and TU Congress (Fabian tract 70)‡	1896
1900	Fabianism and The Empire: A Manifesto (ed. Shaw)	1900
1900	Women as councillors (Fabian tract 93)‡	1900
1901	Socialism for millionaires (Fabian tract 107)‡ )	1901
1904	Fabianism and the fiscal question (Fabian tract 116)‡	Fabian Tracts 1902–18
1904	The Common Sense of Municipal Trading (social commentary)	1908
1910	Socialism and superior brains: a reply to Mr. Mallock (Fabian tract 146)	1926
1914	Common Sense about The War (political commentary)	1914
1914	The Case for Belgium (pamphlet)	1914
1915	More Common Sense about The War (political commentary)	unpublished
1917	How To Settle The Irish Question (political commentary)	1917
1917	What I Really Wrote about The War (political commentary)	1931
1919	Peace Conference Hints (political commentary)	1919
1919	Ruskin's Politics (lecture of 21 November 1919)	1921
1925	Imprisonment (social commentary)	1925; rev. 1946 as The Crime of Imprisonment
1928	The Intelligent Woman's Guide to Socialism and Capitalism	1928; rev. 1937
1929	The League of Nations (political commentary)	1929
1930	Socialism: Principles and Outlook, and Fabianism (Fabian tract 233)	1929
1932	Essays in Fabian Socialism (reprinted tracts with 2 new essays)	1932
1932	The Rationalization of Russia (political commentary)	1964
1933	The Future of Political Science in America (political commentary)	1933
1933	The Political Madhouse in America and Nearer Home (lecture)	1933
1944	Everybody’s Political What's What (political commentary)	1944

=== Fiction ===
Date written	Title	Year of publication
1878	The Legg Papers (abandoned draft of novel)	unpublished
1879	Immaturity (novel)	1930
1880	The Irrational Knot (novel)	serial 1885–7; book 1905
1881	Love Among the Artists (novel)	serial 1887–8; book 1900
1882	Cashel Byron's Profession (novel)	serial 1885–6; book 1886; rev 1889, 1901
1883	An Unsocial Socialist (novel)	serial 1884; book 1887
1885	"The Miraculous Revenge" (short story)	1906
1887–88	An Unfinished Novel (novel fragment)	1958
1932	The Adventures of the Black Girl in Her Search for God (story)	1932
1934	Short Stories, Scraps, and Shavings (stories & playlets)	1934

=== Criticism ===
Date written	Title	Year of publication
1895	The Sanity of Art (art criticism)	1895, rev. 1908
1898	The Perfect Wagnerite (analysis, Wagner's Ring cycle)	1898, rev. 1907
1890	"Ibsen" (Lecture before the Fabian Society)	1970
1891	The Quintessence of Ibsenism (criticism)	1891; rev. 1913
1907–08	Brieux: A Preface (criticism)	1910
1931	Pen Portraits and Reviews (criticism)	1931

=== Miscellaneous writings ===
Date written	Title	Year of publication
1878	"My Dear Dorothea..."	1906
1939	Shaw Gives Himself Away: An Autobiographical Miscellany	1939
1948	The RADA Graduates' Keeepsake and Counsellor (RADA handbook)	1948
1949	Sixteen Self Sketches (revision of Shaw Gives Himself Away)	1949
1950	Rhyming Picture Guide to Ayot Saint Lawrence	1950

== Collections published in Shaw's lifetime ==
Title	Year of publication
Plays Pleasant and Unpleasant: (Unpleasant: Widowers' Houses, The Philanderer and Mrs. Warren's Profession. Pleasant: Arms and the Man, Candida, The Man of Destiny, You Never Can Tell.)	1898
Three Plays for Puritans ( The Devil's Disciple, Caesar and Cleopatra, Captain Brassbound's Conversion)	1901
Dramatic Opinions and Essays: (theatre criticism, Saturday Review 1895-98)	1906
Translations and Tomfooleries: (collection of short plays, including Jitta's Atonement; The Admirable Bashville; Press Cuttings; The Glimpse of Reality; Passion, Poison, and Petrification; The Fascinating Foundling; The Music-Cure)	1926
Our Theatres in the Nineties: (theatre criticism, Saturday Review 1895-98)	1932
Music In London: (music criticism, Star 1888–89; World 1890-94)	1937

== Notes and references ==
=== Sources ===
- "A Chronology of Works by and about Bernard Shaw" (PDF). The International Shaw Society.
- "Fabian Tracts: 1884–1901". LSE Digital Library.
- "Fabian Tracts: 1902–18". LSE Digital Library.
- "Fabian Tracts: 1919–39". LSE Digital Library.
- Holroyd, Michael (1989). Bernard Shaw, Volume 2: 1898–1918: The Pursuit of Power. London: Chatto & Windus. ISBN 978-0-7011-3350-4.
- — (1990). Bernard Shaw, Volume 1: 1856–1898: The Search for Love. London: Penguin. ISBN 978-0-14-012441-5.
- — (1993). Bernard Shaw, Volume 3: 1918–1950: The Lure of Fantasy. London: Penguin. ISBN 978-0-14-012443-9.
- Phillips, Gene (2006). Beyond the Epic: The Life and Films of David Lean. Lexington: The University Press of Kentucky. ISBN 978-0-8131-2415-5.
