= Reza Shirmarz =

Iranian playwright, translator, researcher (born 1974)

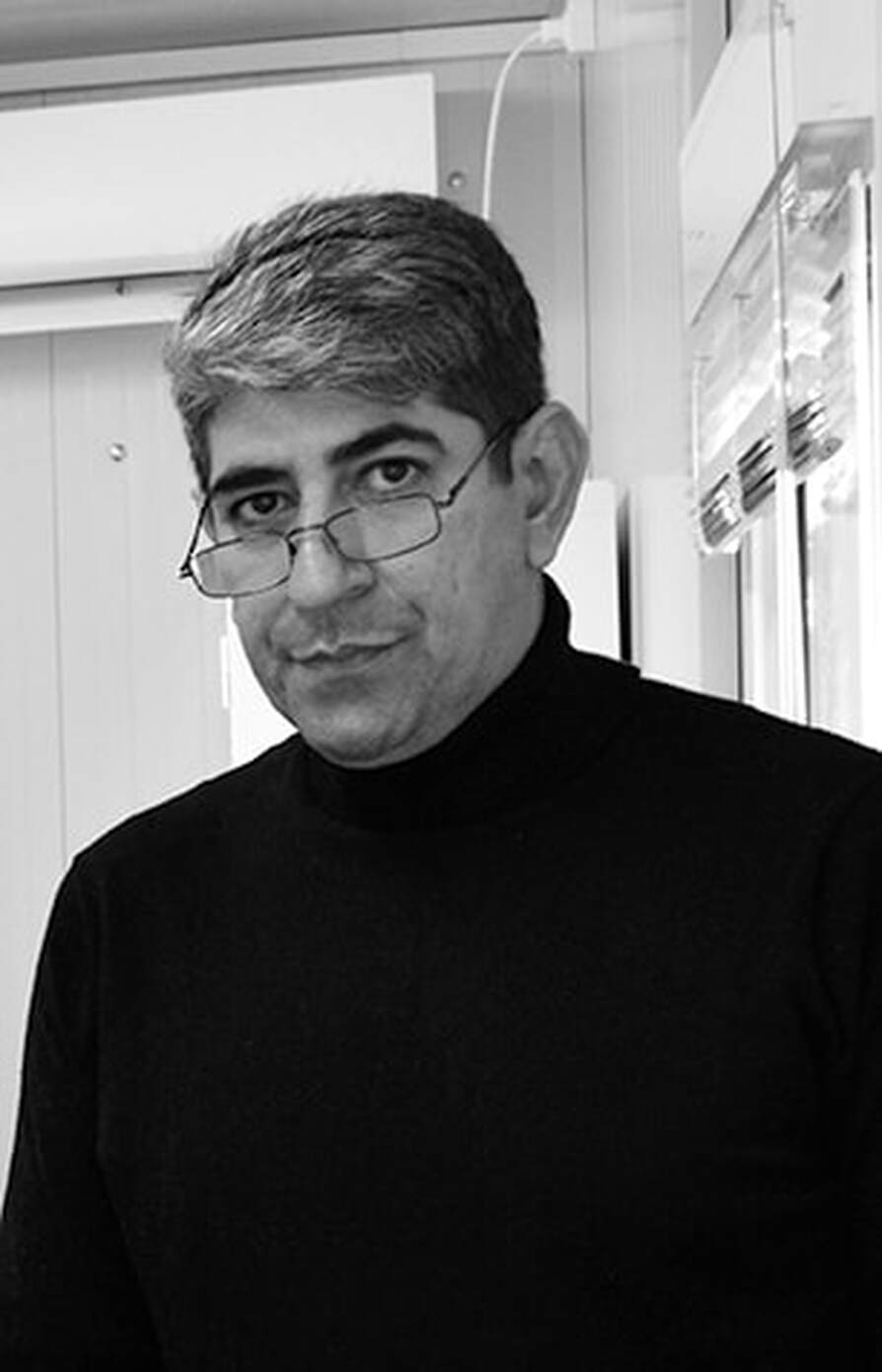
- Reza Shirmarz in 2024
- Born: 1974 (age 51–52); Tehran, Imperial State of Iran
- Education: American College of Greece
- Occupations: Playwright; author; translator; researcher; essayist; voice and speech trainer
- Years active: Since 1998
- Board member of: board of directors in Iran's Playwrights Guild (2007–2009)
- Spouse: Razieh Rafiee (since 2003)
- Children: Maria Shirmarz
- Awards: Fadjr International Theater Festival (2007 & 2008); Iran's National Playwriting Competition (2007); Iran's Book of the Year in Roshd Festival (2011)
- Website: rezashirmarz.com

Signature
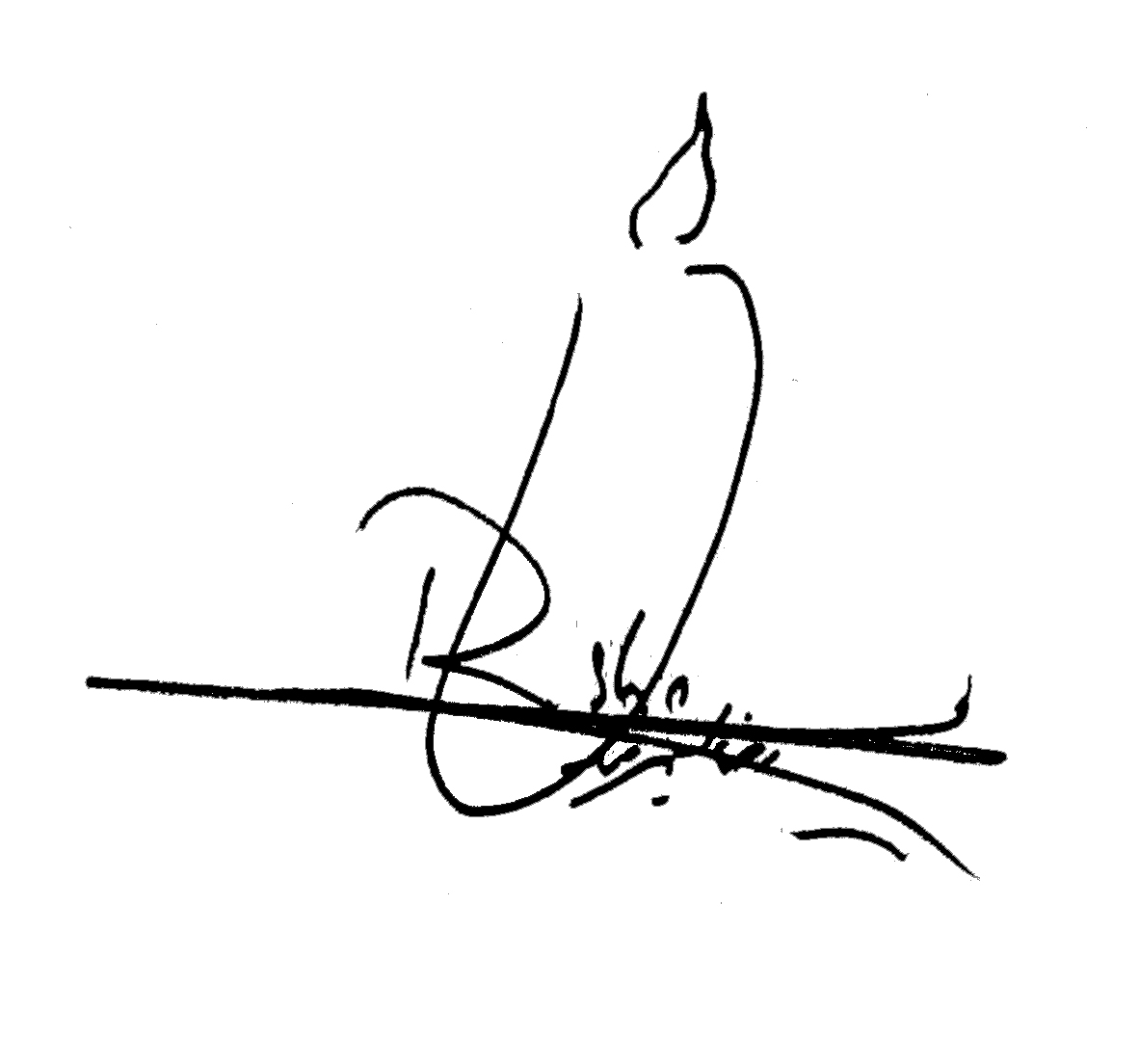

Reza Shirmarz (Persian: رضا شیرمرز; born 1974) is a Greece-based Iranian published, and award-winning playwright, translator, researcher, theatre director and scholar who has written or translated more than forty books and has worked with theaters, drama schools, radio channels and journals in Iran and abroad. Shirmarz was a member of the board of directors of Iran's Playwrights' Guild for three years. He has been a professional member of PEN America and Dramatists Guild of America. He is a language specialist and a full member of the Chartered Institute of Linguists (CIOL) in London.

== Early life ==
Reza Shirmarz was born in Khoy and raised in Tehran, the capital city of Iran. His father was a ground forces colonel with no interest in art and his mother an art lover. Shirmarz is left-handed and bilingual, speaking Persian and Turkish. He began to read Persian classic literature, especially Rumi, as a teenager. He was fascinated by modern short stories, particularly the works of the modern Iranian writer, Sadegh Hedayat. He began to read non-Persian literature intensively after a couple of years when he was 18 years old. Later, he began to read more ancient and modern dramas. He has also written on poets such as T. S. Eliot, Ezra Pound and W. B. Yeats.

== Career overview ==
Shirmarz wrote several plays of which two -Cinnamon Stars and Crystal Vines- were celebrated on a national scale in Fajr International Theater Festival and Iran's National Playwriting Contest. According to the official Website of Fajr International Theater Festival, "at the 26th International Fajr Theater Festival, held after three years in which no selected works were announced, his play Cinnamon Stars was recognized as one the three selected works in the playwriting category. He translated plays and books by Aristophanes (11 plays), Menanderus (1 play), Plautus (20 plays), Terentius (2 plays), George Bernard Shaw (7 plays), Edward Bond (1 play), Somerset Maugham (5 plays), Terence Rattigan (2 plays), Clifford Odets (2 plays), Iakovos Kambanellis (6 plays), John Mortimer (5 plays), Arthur Watkyns & J.A. Ferguson, Edward Albee, Marjorie Bolton, Jean Paul Sartre, Jean Anouilh, etc. He mostly specialized in theater and philosophy. His last book on Robert Wilson, an American theater director, was published in 2015 by Ghatreh publishing company in Tehran. One of his translations from Greek into Persian was Aristotle's Poetics which was published in 2018 in Tehran by the publishing company Ghoghnoos. Although some of his works were already published at the time of President Mohammad Khatami, they have been censored and banned by the Iranian official authorities since the presidency of Mahmoud Ahmadinejad, but he continued writing and translating drama and philosophy into Persian. More than six of his works, such as Cinnamon Stars, Crystal Vines, Deep Blue Sea, Yellow Snow Falls, etc. are forbidden to be published and distributed. One of his translations is The Big knife by Clifford Odets, which has been prohibited since 2008.

== Migration ==
Shirmarz moved to Greece in 2010 to carry out research on ancient Greek culture and civilization, learn Greek language while studying at the university of Athens and translate Greek theatrical and philosophical works into Persian directly from Greek. Six plays of Iakovos Kambanellis were the first series of theatrical works he translated directly from the Greek language into Persian. He has been translating the complete works of Aristotle into Persian language of which the first volume (The Poetics) was published in 2017.

== Plays ==
Reza Shirmarz started his career as a playwright with a series of realist dramas, including Cinnamon Stars (2007), Crystal Vines (2008), and The Lanterns Are Weeping (2014), a trilogy which is "characterized by their engagement with sociopolitical issues in Iran and were written over a period of nearly a decade," the three dramatic works also trace the development of recurring characters as they mature and change across the three play. Although the plays are primarily grounded in realism, their staging allows for interpretations that incorporate non-realist theatrical approaches. Each work reflects aspects of a different period in post-revolutionary Iran and addresses changes in the country's social and political environment. For example, The Lanterns Are Weeping, the final play in the trilogy, represents a shift toward antirealism in his writing. Its central premise involves a writer whose blood inexplicably turns green, an event that attracts media attention and causes turmoil among the writer and those around him. The surreal element functions within a broader political and psychological framework associated with the social unrest surrounding Iran's Green movement. His use of antirealism and symbolic elements continues in later plays, including Deep Blue Sea and The Corners of Death. These plays combine realism with allegory and symbolism, further developing the relationship between political themes and non-realistic theatrical techniques in his writing. Furthermore, Shirmarz is "recognized for his bold and politically charged works." For instance, "in May 2025 the Chopin Theatre in Chicago initiated the First Annual Theater of the Absurd Festival. The Festival featured eight plays staged on a rotating basis of two or three in the evening matinee performances, including Pinter's The Dumb Waitress, Beckett's Catastrophe, Vaclav Havel's Mistake, Reza Shirmarz's Muzzled, Edward Albee's The Zoo Story, Sam Shepard's Action, Israel Horovitz's Line, and Slawomir Mrozek's The Police." Here are the list of some of Shirmarz's plays:

- Cinnamon Stars (celebrated play in Fajr International Theater Festival and National Playwriting Competition, published by Namayesh Publication Center, 2007). This play was given a reading in the City Theater of Tehran. The following year Shirmarz tried to direct it with a professional crew, but the performance was banned by authorities.
- Crystal Vines (play in Fajr International Theater Festival and published by Namayesh Publication Center, 2008). This play was read in National Theater as well, but banned at the time of performance as well in 2009.
- My Hands (published in Theater Magazine, 2009)
- Deep Blue Sea (published in a literary magazine called Payab, 2010)
- Meeting (2011)
- Yellow Snow Falls (2012) (published in a literary magazine called Payab, 2011)
- The Corners of Death (2013), a modern four-part play
- Acharnon Street Vulture (2014)
- Lanterns Are Weeping (2014), the third part of the trilogy called Cinnamon Stars
- Immigrants (2015, English); this one-act play was translated into Greek by Nikos Anastasopoulos in 2016.
- Tsunami (2016)
- The Pipe (2019)
- Muzzled (2022): This play is a response to Samuel Beckett's Catastrophe, a short play which was written in support of dissident Czech Vaclav Havel. Muzzled was published by Index on Censorship on January 12, 2022. Catastrophe by Beckett and Mistake by Havel were published together by Index in 1984. Muzzled was also published by Index in the 50th anniversary birthday of the Sage journal in January 2022. These three plays were produced as a part of Theatre of the Absurd Festival at the Chopin Theatre in Chicago in May 2025.

== Books ==
- Stage Speech: Practical Exercises, published by Ghatreh Publication Company, 1st edition in 2012 and 12th edition in 2020.
- I think through my eyes, on Robert Wilson’s Visual Theater, Ghatreh Publishing Company, 2015.
- Comedy (forthcoming)
- The Philosophy of Theater, Ghoghnoos Publishing Company, Tehran, 1st edition in 2017 and 4th edition in 2022.

== Translations ==
- The Bad-Tempered, Menander, Sooreh University Press, 2000.
- The complete plays of Aristophanes: Acharnians, The Knights, The Clouds, The Wasps, Peace, Lysistrata, The Birds, The Frogs, Thesmophoriazuse, Ecclesiazuse, and Plutus, in Seven volumes, Ghatreh Publishing Company, 2015.
- The complete plays of Plautus: Amphitryon, The Comedy of Asses, The Pot of Gold, Two Bacchides, Casket, Curculio, Epidicus, Menaachi, Merchant, Braggart Soldier, Haunted House, The Girl From Persia, Carthaginians, Psudolous, The Rope, Stichus, Trinummus, Triculentus, Casina & The Captives, in three volumes, Ghatreh Publishing Company, 2002.
- The Anatomy of Drama, Marjorie Boulton, Ghatreh Publishing Company, 1st edition in 2003 & 4th edition in 2013.
- Stage for Speech, by Evangeline Machlin, Ghatreh Publishing Company, First edition 2003 & 10th 2013.
- Seven One-act plays by George Bernard Shaw: How He Lied to Her Husband, The Glimpse of Reality, Augustus Does His Bit, Passion Poison & Petrifaction, The Shewing-Up of Blanco Posnet, The Dark Lady of the Sonnets, Annajanska The Bolshevik Empress, Ghatreh Publishing Company, 2007.
- Great Peace by Edward Bond, Ghatreh Publishing Company, 2009.
- Golden boy, Clifford Odets, Ghatreh Publishing Company, 2009.
- Essays on Aesthetics, by Jean-Paul Sartre, 1st edition in 2001 & 6th edition in 2005, Ahange Digar Publication, 2009.
- Evoking Shakespeare by Peter Brook, Ghatreh Publishing Company, 2009.
- Orchestra & The Dye-Hard, two one-act plays by Jean Anhoui and Harold Brighouse, Ghatreh Publishing Company. 2009.
- The Boy Comes Home & The Londonderry air, two plays by A. A. Milne & Rachel Field, Ghatreh Publishing Company, 2010.
- He & His Trousers & The Wrong Man & Woman by Iakovos Kambanellis, Ghatreh Publishing Company, 2010.
- Sheppy by Somerset Maugham, Ghatreh Publishing Company, 2010.
- The World Encyclopedia of Contemporary Theater, Volume 5: Asia/Pacific, Ghatreh Publishing Company, 2010, celebrated as the best educational book of the year in Roshd Book Festival.
- Ancient Roman Comedies: Andria & Phormio by Terence, Ghatreh Publishing Company, 2010.
- The Dock Brief & Women at War, two plays by John Mortimer and Edward Percy, Ghatreh Publishing Company, 2010.
- Browning Version & Adventure Story by Terence Rattigan, Ghatreh Publishing Company, 2010.
- Letter to Orestes & Thebes Sidestreets by Iakovos Kambanellis, Ghatreh Publishing Company, 2011.
- Characters for Violin and Orchestra by Iakovos Kambanellis, Ghatreh Publishing Company, 2011.
- Such Stuff As Dreams & Wanted, Mr Stuart!, two plays by J.A. Ferguson and Arthur Watkyn, Ghatreh Publishing Company, 2012.
- Poetics by Aristotles, from Greek language, Ghoghnoos Publishing Company,1st edition 2017, 2nd edition 2020, and 4th edition in 2026.
- Rhetoric by Aristotles, from Greek language (forthcoming)

== Articles and essays ==
- The Post-modern Literature of Samuel Beckett, in Kelk Literary Magazine, Tehran, 2004.
- An Analytical View on "The Clouds", A Comedy by Aristophanes, in Hamshahri Philosophical Magazine, Tehran, 2007.
- Structural Analysis of Aristophanes’ Comedy-writing, in Tehran University, Tehran, 2008.
- Iakovos Kambanellis, A Contemporary Greek playwright, in Directors’ Center Book, 1st volume, 2012.
- Theater and Phenomenology, in Directors’ Center Book, 2nd volume, 2013.
- Dramatic Interaction, The Linguist, Vol 54/N 1, Chartered Institute of Linguists, 2015.
- Dancing in Chain, The Linguist, Vol 54/N 5, Chartered Institute of Linguists, 2015.
- A Short Review of Children Theater in Greece, Theater Magazine, 2015.
- Stage Design in Greek Theater, Theater Magazine, 2015.
- An Introduction to Contemporary Greek Theater, Theater Magazine, 2015.
- Desperate Liaisons, The Linguist, Vol 55/N 2, Chartered Institute of Linguists, 2016.
- Theater Architecture in Modern Greece, Theater Magazine, 2016.
- Playwriting in Modern Greece, Theater Magazine, 2016.
- What Does Theater Mean, Theater Magazine, 2017.
- An Introduction to Contemporary Theater of Egypt, Theater Magazine, 2017.
- Lines of Resistance: Iranian Editorial Cartooning, Censorship, and Subversion Since 1903, The Journal of Comics and Culture, Vol 10, 2025, pp. 17-76.
- Somathorybics: The Governance of Bodies as Noise, The Journal of Somaesthetics, Vol 12, No. 1, 2026, pp. 25-40.

== Collaborations ==
Shirmarz translated two essays on African rituals and their theatrical aspects, which were published as parts of a book called Drama and Religion published in Fajr International Theater Festival by Iran's Performing arts center in 2007. He was active in various Iranian radio channels as writer, translator and narrator for more than a decade from 1999 to 2009 the year he left Iran for Greece. Shirmarz has adapted and translated more than 100 dramatic works to be performed in radio and has worked as a theater critic. Despite all his artistic efforts in Iranian mainstream theater and media, he and his colleagues were deprived of their activities at the time of Mahmoud Ahmadinejad, the fundamentalist Iranian president who was elected in year 2009. Shirmarz was also active in the administrative part of Fajr International Theater Festival for three years at the time of reformist Iranian president Mohammad Khatami from 2001 to 2004. He has worked with several literary or theatrical magazines (Kelk, Theater, Payab, etc.), journals (The Linguist in London), newspapers (Hamshahri, Farhikhtegan, Shargh, Jame'e, etc.), news agencies (IBNA, ISNA, etc.) for almost two decades since the outset of his career. He has also been giving speeches and lectures as a playwright, theater director, researcher, theorist and critic in different performing arts centers in Iran, mostly in Tehran. Shirmarz became an honorary member of Vanagahan Theater Group in Iran and conducted a number of voice and speech workshops for the actors of the group. He performed some vocal parts of some of the performances of the group in three languages a couple of years ago.
