= Op. 112 =

In music, Op. 112 stands for Opus number 112. Compositions that are assigned this number include:

- Beethoven – Meeresstille und glückliche Fahrt
- Dvořák – The Devil and Kate
- Ries – Symphony No. 5
- Schumann – Der Rose Pilgerfahrt
- Shostakovich – Symphony No. 12
- Sibelius – Tapiola, tone poem for orchestra (1926)
- Weinberg – Lady Magnesia
