= Playhouse Theatre =

West End theatre in London

- Royal Avenue Theatre; Avenue Theatre
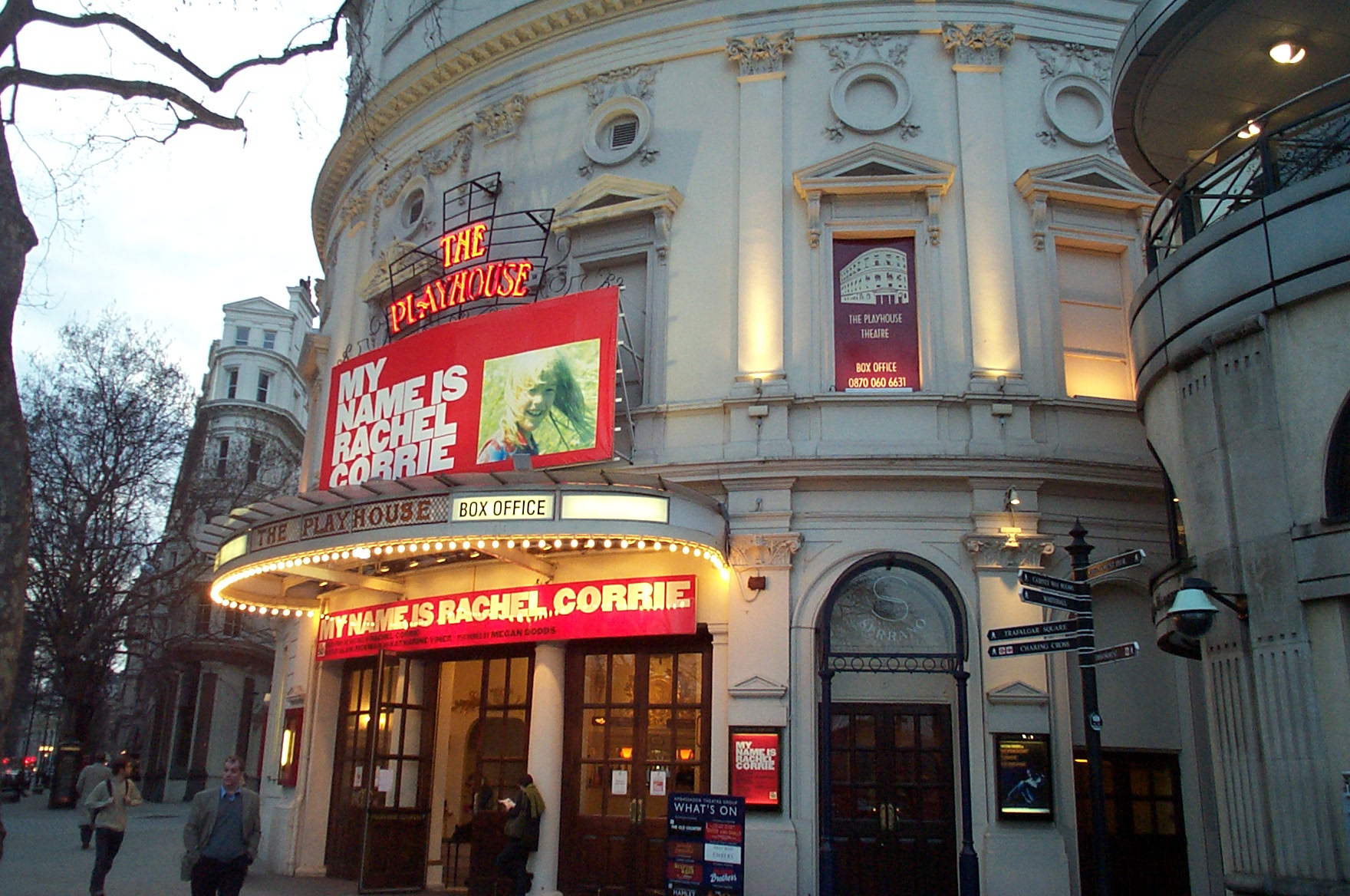
- My Name Is Rachel Corrie at the Playhouse Theatre in 2006
- Interactive map of Playhouse Theatre
- Address: Craven Street; London, WC2; United Kingdom
- Coordinates: 51°30′25″N 0°7′25″W
- Owner: ATG Entertainment
- Operator: ATG Entertainment
- Capacity: 550 on 3 levels (as the Kit Kat Club)
- Type: West End theatre
- Designation: Grade II listed
- Production: Cabaret
- Public transit: Charing Cross; Embankment; Charing Cross

Construction
- Opened: 11 March 1882; 144 years ago
- Rebuilt: 1907 (Blow and Billerey)
- Architects: F. H. Fowler & Hill

Website
- Playhouse Theatre at Ambassador Theatre Group

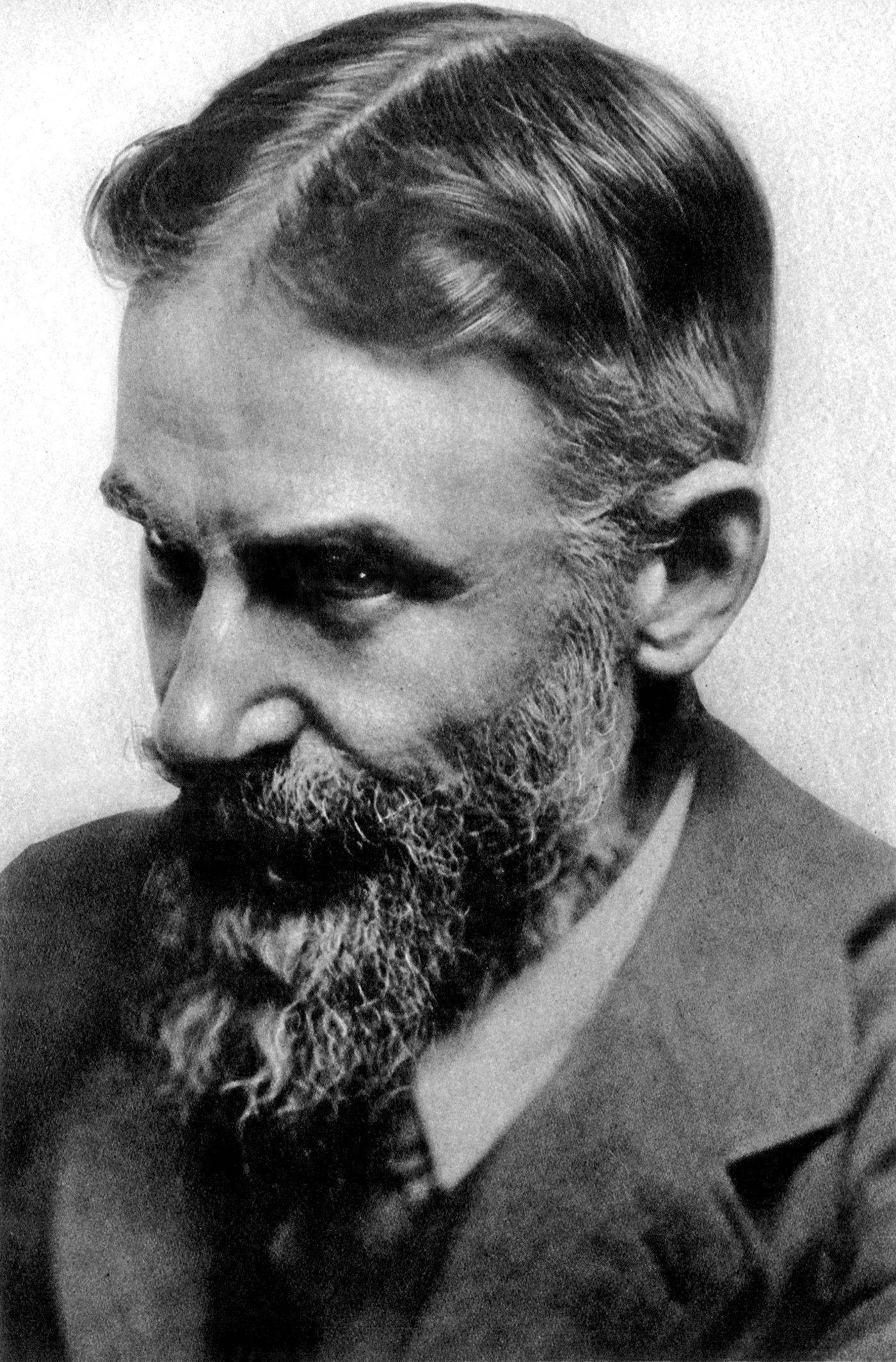
George Bernard Shaw

The Playhouse Theatre is a West End theatre in the City of Westminster, in Northumberland Avenue, near Trafalgar Square, central London. The theatre was built by F. H. Fowler and Hill with a seating capacity of 1,200. It was rebuilt in 1907 and retains its original substage machinery. As of November 2021, the theatre has been refurbished and advertised as the Kit Kat Club while it is hosting a revival of the musical Cabaret.

== History ==
=== Early years ===
Built by Sefton Henry Parry as the Royal Avenue Theatre, it opened on 11 March 1882 with 1,200 seats. The first production at the theatre was Jacques Offenbach's Madame Favart. In its early seasons, the theatre hosted comic operas, burlesques and farces for several years. For much of this time, the low comedian Arthur Roberts, a popular star of the music halls, starred at the theatre. By the 1890s, the theatre was presenting drama, and in 1894 Annie Horniman, the tea heiress, anonymously sponsored the actress Florence Farr in a season of plays at the theatre. Farr's first production was unsuccessful, and so she prevailed upon her friend, George Bernard Shaw, to hurry and make his West End début at the theatre with Arms and the Man in 1894. It was successful enough to allow him to discontinue music criticism to focus full-time on play writing. The actress Gladys Cooper managed the theatre for some years.

The theatre was rebuilt in 1905 to the designs of Blow and Billerey. During the work, part of the roof of the adjacent Charing Cross railway station collapsed. The roof and girders fell across the train lines but part of the station's western wall also fell and crashed through the roof and wall of the theatre. This resulted in the deaths of three people in the station, and three workmen on the theatre site and injuries to many more. The theatre was repaired and re-opened as The Playhouse on 28 January 1907 with a one-act play called The Drums of Oudh and a play called Toddles, by Tristan Bernard and Andre Godferneaux. Shaw wrote a sketch entitled The Interlude at the Playhouse for the occasion.

The new theatre had a smaller seating capacity of 679. W. Somerset Maugham's Home and Beauty premièred at the Playhouse on 30 August 1919, running for 235 performances, and Henry Daniell appeared here in February 1926 as the Prince of Karaslavia in Mr. Abdulla. Nigel Bruce appeared in February 1927 as Robert Crosbie in Somerset Maugham's The Letter, and again in May 1930 as Robert Brennan in Dishonoured Lady. Alec Guinness made his stage début here in Ward Dorane's play Libel! on 2 April 1934. Daniell returned in November that year as Paul Miller in Hurricane.

=== BBC studio ===
In 1951 it was taken over by the BBC as a recording studio for live performances. The Goon Show and the radio versions of Hancock's Half Hour and Steptoe and Son were recorded here, although at least the first two shows were also recorded at other venues during their runs. The stage also hosted live performances by Kiss, Queen, Led Zeppelin, The Who, The Beatles and The Rolling Stones. On 3 April 1967, a live Pink Floyd concert was broadcast from the theatre.

When the BBC left around 1976, the theatre went dark and was in danger of demolition.

=== Other uses ===
In 1986, rock band Queen used the Playhouse Theatre as the set for their "A Kind of Magic" music video.

=== 1987 return to theatre usage ===
The theatre was restored to its 1907 design by impresario Robin Gonshaw with the help of Iain Mackintosh of theatre consultants Theatre Projects, opening again in October 1987 with the musical Girlfriends. A commercial building, Aria House, was erected above the theatre.

In 1988, novelist and politician Jeffrey Archer bought the Playhouse for just over £1 million. The following year, the theatre was offered commercial sponsorship by a financial services' company, and for a while it was known as the MI Group Playhouse. In 1991, the Playhouse became home to the Peter Hall Company, and a number of critically and commercially successful plays were performed there, including Tennessee Williams' The Rose Tattoo (1991), starring Julie Walters and Moliere's Tartuffe (1991), starring Paul Eddington and Felicity Kendal. Around this time the basement bar area of the theatre was converted into a private restaurant, Shaws, but the enterprise was unsuccessful and the space was later converted back into a bar/cafe.

In 1992, Archer sold the Playhouse to the writer and impresario Ray Cooney for just over £2 million. That year Cooney staged the West End premiere of his latest farce It Runs in the Family at the Playhouse. This was followed by Jane Eyre (1993), adapted by Fay Weldon and starring Tim Pigott-Smith; Frederick Lonsdale's On Approval, (1994), starring Simon Ward, Martin Jarvis and Anna Carteret; and Ray Cooney's Funny Money in 1995.

In 1996, Cooney sold the Playhouse to American investment banker Patrick Sulaiman Cole, whose first production was a critically acclaimed revival of Henrik Ibsen's A Doll's House in 1996, directed by Anthony Page and starring Janet McTeer. Later that year, the theatre was closed for complete refurbishment under the direction of English Heritage, with the auditorium luxuriously decorated, with grandiose murals, caryatids, golden pillars, carved balustrades, and shining gold decoration.

The theatre reopened in 1997 with Sulaiman Cole's production and the West End première of Anton Chekhov's The Wood Demon. This was followed by Sulaiman Cole's production of a first ever West End Snoo Wilson premiere, "HRH", directed by Simon Callow, about the British royal family's Duke and Duchess of Windsor, which opened the day after the death of Diana, Princess of Wales. The play was harshly reviewed as anti-Royal. The theatre returned to life as a commercial receiving house with several seasons of Almeida Theatre and Cheek by Jowl productions, including the premiere of David Hare's The Judas Kiss.

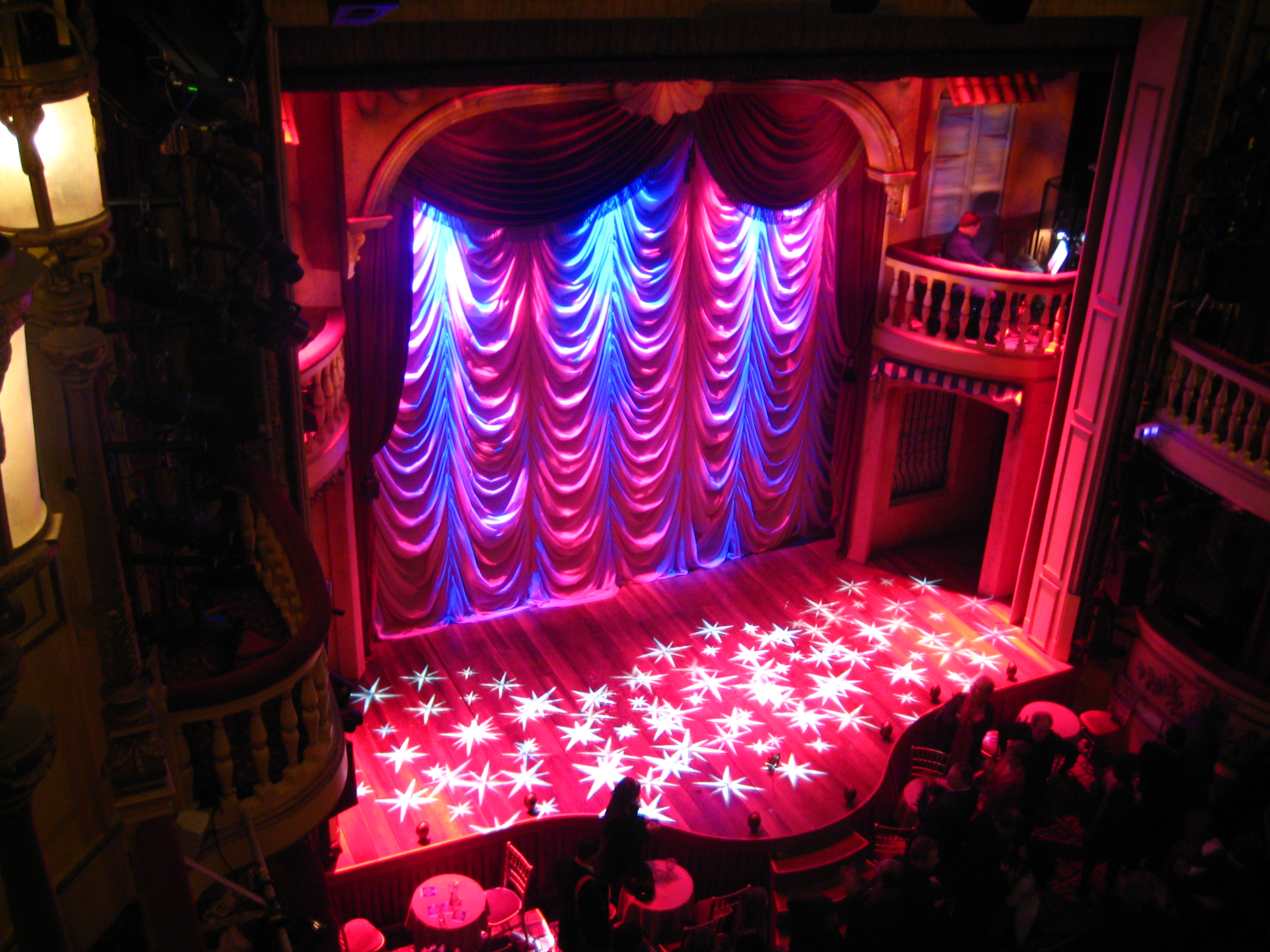
Interior of the theatre

Successes at the Playhouse since the late 1990s have included Naked (1998); J. B. Priestley's An Inspector Calls (2001) and Journey's End, directed by David Grindley.

American theatrical producers Ted and Norman Tulchin's Maidstone Productions purchased the theatre at the end of 2002, with the venue managed by ATG Entertainment. The Playhouse hosted Richard Eyre's 2003 Olivier Award-winning production of Vincent in Brixton, starring Clare Higgins; Eyre's 2005 production of Hedda Gabler, starring Eve Best; and Megan Dodds in a transfer of My Name Is Rachel Corrie by Alan Rickman and Katharine Viner in 2006.

More recent successes include the musical Dancing in the Streets, The Adventures of Tintin based on the famous comic-book detective, The Harder They Come, and La Cage Aux Folles.

In December 2013, ATG had acquired 100 percent ownership of the Playhouse.

From December 2019, it was announced that The Jamie Lloyd Company would take up residence with a series of revivals, beginning with Cyrano de Bergerac starring James McAvoy, The Seagull starring Emilia Clarke and A Doll's House starring Jessica Chastain. The Seagull and A Doll's House were cancelled due to the COVID-19 pandemic.

Following renovations to the theatre during the pandemic, the theatre re-opened as the Kit Kat Club to house a new revival of Cabaret starring Eddie Redmayne and Jessie Buckley which began previews on 15 November 2021. The renovations included converting the theatre into an in-the-round layout and reducing the capacity to 550.

== Recent and present productions ==
- Three Sisters (3 April 2003 – 29 June 2003) by Anton Chekhov, translated by Christopher Hampton, starring Kristin Scott Thomas
- Vincent in Brixton (19 July 2003 – 23 August 2003) by Nicholas Wright
- Les Liaisons Dangereuses (12 December 2003 – 10 January 2004) by Christopher Hampton
- Journey's End (3 May 2004 – 2 October 2004) by R.C. Sherriff
- Romeo and Juliet (18 November 2004 – 9 January 2005) by William Shakespeare
- The RSC: House of Desires (1 February 2005 – 21 March 2005) by Sor Juana de la Cruz
- The RSC: Dog in the Manger (2 February 2005 – 26 March 2005) by Lope de Vega, translated by David Johnston
- The RSC: Pedro, The Great Pretender (17 February 2005 – 12 March 2005) by Miguel de Cervantes, translated by Philip Osment
- The Postman Always Rings Twice (8 June 2005 – 3 September 2005) by James M. Cain adapted by Andrew Rattenbury, starring Val Kilmer
- As You Desire Me (27 October 2005 – 22 January 2006) by Luigi Pirandello, starring Kristin Scott Thomas and Bob Hoskins
- The Creeper (9 February 2006 – 18 March 2006) by Pauline Macaulay, starring Ian Richardson
- My Name is Rachel Corrie (30 March 2006 – 21 May 2006) by Alan Rickman and Katherine Vilner, starring Megan Dodds
- The Rocky Horror Show (4 July 2006 – 22 July 2006) by Richard O'Brien, starring David Bedella and Suzanne Shaw
- Dancing in the Streets (1 August 2006 – 14 July 2007)
- Footloose – The Musical (17 August 2007 – 6 December 2007)
- The Adventures of Tintin (9 December 2007 – 12 January 2008), adapted from Hergé's novels
- Ring Round the Moon (19 February 2008 – 29 March 2008) by Christopher Fry, adapted from Jean Anouilh's L'Invitation au Château, directed by Sean Mathias, starring Angela Thorne
- The Harder They Come (23 March 2008 – 13 September 2008) by Perry Henzel
- La Cage aux Folles (20 October 2008 – 2 January 2010) by Jerry Herman and Harvey Fierstein, starring Roger Allam, Douglas Hodge, Graham Norton and Philip Quast
- Dreamboats and Petticoats (6 January 2010 – 4 August 2012)
- Monty Python's Spamalot (14 November 2012 – 12 April 2014)
- 1984 (28 April 2014 – 23 August 2014)
- Women on the Verge of a Nervous Breakdown (12 January 2015 – 23 May 2015)
- 1984 (12 June 2015 – 5 September 2015)
- The Rocky Horror Show (11 September 2015 – 16 September 2015) by Richard O'Brien, starring David Bedella, Ben Forster, Haley Flaherty and Richard O'Brien (broadcast live on 17 September as The Rocky Horror Show Live with O'Brien, Stephen Fry, Adrian Edmondson, Emma Bunton, Mel Giedroyc and Anthony Head as guest narrators)
- Lord of the Dance: Dangerous Games (10 October 2015 – 24 January 2016)
- The End of Longing (2 February 2016 – 14 May 2016)
- 1984 (14 June 2016 – 29 October 2016)
- An Inspector Calls (4 November 2016 – 25 March 2017)
- David Baddiel - My Family: Not The Sitcom (28 March 2017 – 3 June 2017)
- The Kite Runner (8 June 2017 – 26 August 2017)
- Glengarry Glen Ross (9 November 2017 – 3 February 2018) by David Mamet, starring Christian Slater and Kris Marshall
- The Best Man (5 March 2018 – 26 May 2018) by Gore Vidal, starring Martin Shaw and Maureen Lipman
- The Jungle (16 June – 3 November 2018) Joe Murphy and Joe Robertson, directed by Stephen Daldry.
- Caroline, Or Change (20 November 2018 – 9 February 2019) Book and lyrics by Tony Kushner, Music by Jeanine Tesori. Directed by Michael Longhurst. Starring Sharon D Clarke
- Fiddler on the Roof (27 March 2019 – 2 November 2019)
- Cyrano de Bergerac (6 December 2019 – 29 February 2020) starring James McAvoy
- Cabaret (15 November 2021 – Present) starring Eddie Redmayne and Jessie Buckley, Mason Alexander Park and Maude Apatow, and Jake Shears and Rebecca Lucy Taylor

== Gallery ==
Floor plans of the 1906 reconstruction by Blow & Billerey

Longitudinal section of the 1906 reconstruction

Interior view of the 1906 reconstruction

Wall murals by Bremond & Tastemain

Curtain by Bremond & Tastemain with Gobbé-Duval

== See also ==
- List of London theatres
- List of West End musicals
- List of notable musical theatre productions
- O'Donnell v Shanahan – a legal case in concerning the fifth floor above the theatre
