= Marconi scandal =

British political scandal (1912–1913)

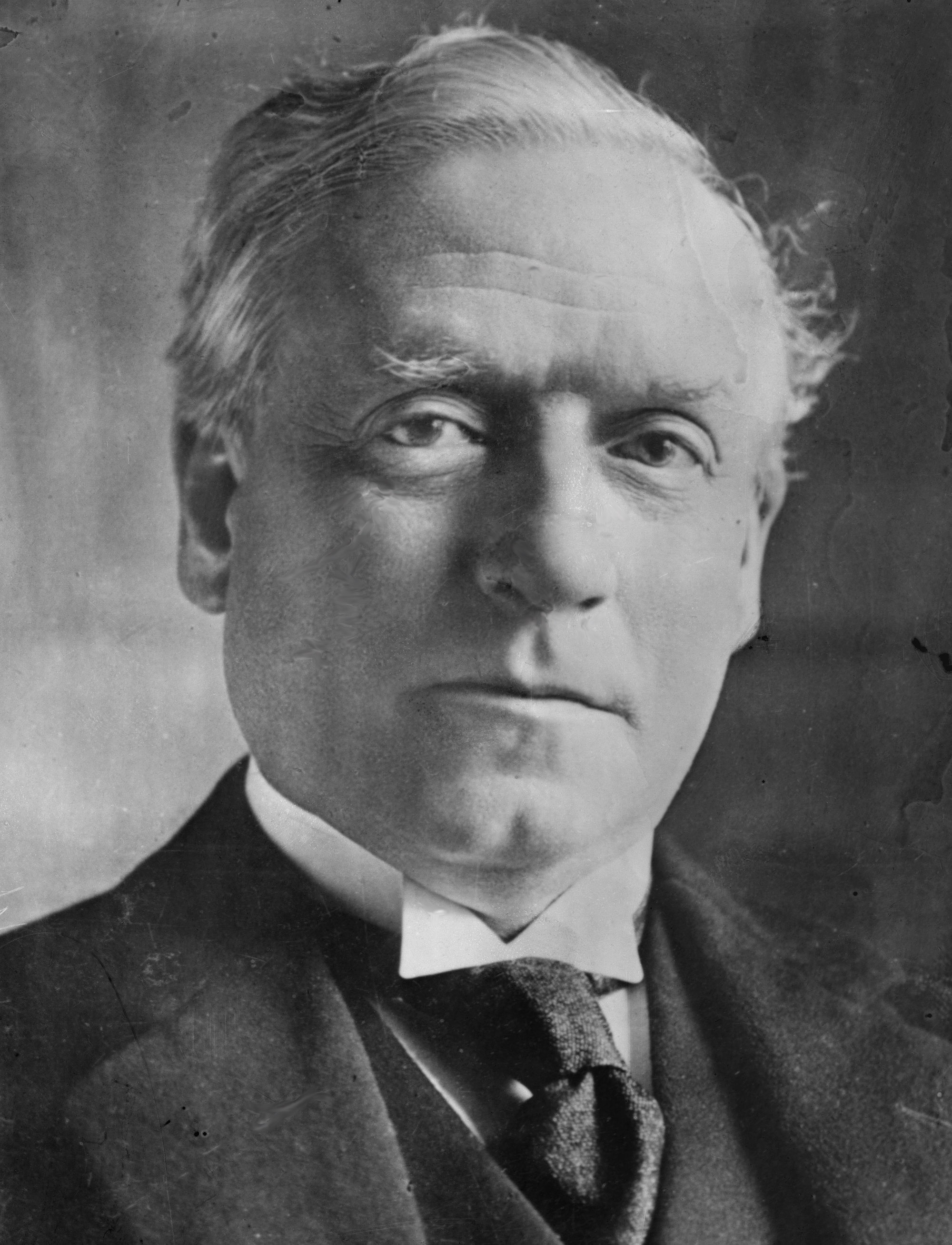
H.H. Asquith, former Prime Minister of the UK.

The Marconi scandal was a British political scandal that broke in mid-1912. Allegations were made that highly placed members of the Liberal government under the Prime Minister H. H. Asquith had profited by improper use of information about the government's intentions with respect to the Marconi Company. They had known that the government was about to issue a lucrative contract to the British Marconi company for the Imperial Wireless Chain and had bought shares in an American subsidiary.

== Insider trading allegations ==
Allegations and rumours about insider trading in Marconi shares involved a number of government ministers, including Lloyd George, the Chancellor of the Exchequer; Sir Rufus Isaacs, the Attorney General; Herbert Samuel, the Postmaster General; and Alexander Murray, the Parliamentary Secretary to the Treasury. The allegations were based on the fact that Isaacs' brother, Godfrey Isaacs, was managing director of Marconi.

Historians have explored the role of antisemitism in motivating the allegations. The allegations, whether true or not, were well-founded and serious enough to be brought to public attention. Particularly active in the attack was the New Witness, edited by Cecil Chesterton. This was a distributist publication founded in 1911 by Hilaire Belloc as Eye-Witness, with Cecil's brother G. K. Chesterton on the editorial staff. It had a Catholic perspective and was accused of antisemitism.

In February 1913, the French newspaper Le Matin alleged that Sir Rufus Isaacs and Herbert Samuel had abused their position to buy shares in the English Marconi company. Both men sued for libel and Le Matin withdrew and apologised. During the case, Isaacs testified that he had bought shares in American Marconi and sold some on to Lloyd George and Lord Murray. It was not made public during the trial that these shares had been made available through Isaacs's brother at a favourable price. The factual matters were at least partly resolved by a parliamentary select committee investigation, which issued three reports: all found that ministers had purchased shares in the American Marconi company, but while the Liberal members of the committee cleared the ministers of all blame, the other members reported that they had acted with "grave impropriety". The truth of the matter has been described as "obscure".

== Court case ==
Cecil Chesterton expected to be sued by the government ministers under the libel laws, which put the burden of proof on the defendant. Instead, Godfrey Isaacs, Marconi's director, brought a criminal libel action against him. The New Age (12 June 1913) described the trial

If circumstantial evidence were ever sufficient to justify a charge, we do not doubt that in the case of Mr. Godfrey Isaacs v. Mr. Cecil Chesterton, the latter and not the former would have won. The case of Mr. Chesterton was admittedly based on circumstances and on such reasonable deductions from them as on the face of the facts any average mind would have felt impelled to draw. Unfortunately, however, for him the circumstances themselves proved insusceptible of any further evidence than their own existence.

The court ruled against Chesterton and fined him a token £100 plus costs, which was paid by his supporters. Some of them claimed the decision would have gone differently had Chesterton's lawyer aggressively gone after the accused ministers who were at the heart of the scandal. In the next issue of the New Witness, Chesterton repeated his allegations against the ministers, who still did not sue.

== Aftermath ==
The events were satirised by George Bernard Shaw as the "macaroni shares" scandal in his play The Music Cure, which was written to accompany G. K. Chesterton's play Magic: A Fantastic Comedy, an attack on deceptive mediums which also referred to the scandal. In 1919, Cecil Chesterton's A History of the United States was published, posthumously. In the introduction, his brother G. K. Chesterton wrote this about him

In collaboration with Mr. Belloc he had written The Party System, in which the plutocratic and corrupt nature of our present polity is set forth. And when Mr. Belloc founded the Eye-Witness, as a bold and independent organ of the same sort of criticism, he served as the energetic second in command. He subsequently became editor of the Eye-Witness, which was renamed as the New Witness. It was during the latter period that the great test case of political corruption occurred; pretty well known in England, and unfortunately much better known in Europe, as the Marconi scandal. To narrate its alternate secrecies and sensations would be impossible here; but one fashionable fallacy about it may be exploded with advantage. An extraordinary notion still exists that the New Witness denounced Ministers for gambling on the Stock Exchange. It might be improper for Ministers to gamble; but gambling was certainly not a misdemeanour that would have hardened with any special horror so hearty an Anti-Puritan as the man of whom I write. The Marconi case did not raise the difficult ethics of gambling, but the perfectly plain ethics of secret commissions. The charge against the Ministers was that, while a government contract was being considered, they tried to make money out of a secret tip, given them by the very government contractor with whom their government was supposed to be bargaining. This was what their accuser asserted; but this was not what they attempted to answer by a prosecution. He was prosecuted, not for what he had said of the government, but for some secondary things he had said of the government contractor. The latter, Mr. Godfrey Isaacs, gained a verdict for criminal libel; and the judge inflicted a fine of £100.

— Cecil Chesterton

In her biography of G. K. Chesterton, Maisie Ward devotes a chapter to the scandal and notes, "Four days after the verdict against Cecil Chesterton, the Parliamentary Committee produced its report". She goes on to describe that report: "By the usual party vote of 8 to 6, it adopted a report prepared by Mr. Falconer (one of the two whom Rufus Isaacs had approached privately) which simply took the line that the Ministers had acted in good faith and refrained from criticizing them". She concludes the chapter with these words, which suggest that, at the very best, the ministers involved lacked judgment,

As the Times leading article of June 19, 1913, put it: "A man is not blamed for being splashed with mud. He is commiserated. But if he has stepped into a puddle which he might easily have avoided, we say that it is his own fault. If he protests that he did not know it was a puddle, we say that he ought to know better; but if he says that it was after all quite a clean puddle, then we judge him deficient in the sense of cleanliness. And the British public like their public men to have a very nice sense of cleanliness."

That, fundamentally, was what troubled Gilbert Chesterton then and for the rest of his life. He was not himself an investigator of political scandals--in that field he trusted his brother and Belloc, and on this particular matter Cecil had certainly said more than he knew and possibly more than was true. But it did not take an expert to know that some of the men involved in the Marconi Case had no very nice sense of cleanliness: and these men were going to be dominant in the councils of England, and to represent England in the face of the world, for a long time to come.

— Maisie Ward

== Views ==
The historian Ian Christopher Fletcher wrote:

The Marconi scandal had unfolded in the context of bitter fights over such issues as Irish Home Rule and British land reform. Coming amid nebulous charges traded by Liberals and Conservatives about the evils of aristocracy and protectionism, on the one hand, and of plutocracy and socialism, on the other hand, the scandal only served to deepen public disillusionment with pre-war party politics.

In 1936, G. K. Chesterton credited the Marconi scandal with initiating a subtle but important shift in the attitude of the British public:

It is the fashion to divide recent history into Pre-War and Post-War conditions. I believe it is almost as essential to divide them into the Pre-Marconi and Post-Marconi days. It was during the agitations upon that affair that the ordinary English citizen lost his invincible ignorance; or, in ordinary language, his innocence.... I think it probable that centuries will pass before it is seen clearly and in its right perspective; and that then it will be seen as one of the turning-points in the whole history of England and the world.

Bryan Cheyette argues that the negative 'Jewish financier' stereotype was present first and indeed was established in British culture quite some time before the scandal broke.

== In popular culture ==
The television series Downton Abbey used the Marconi scandal as a plot element during the second season, with Lavinia Swire sharing evidence about illegal dealings to Sir Richard Carlisle.
