= The Perfect Wagnerite =

1898 book by George Bernard Shaw

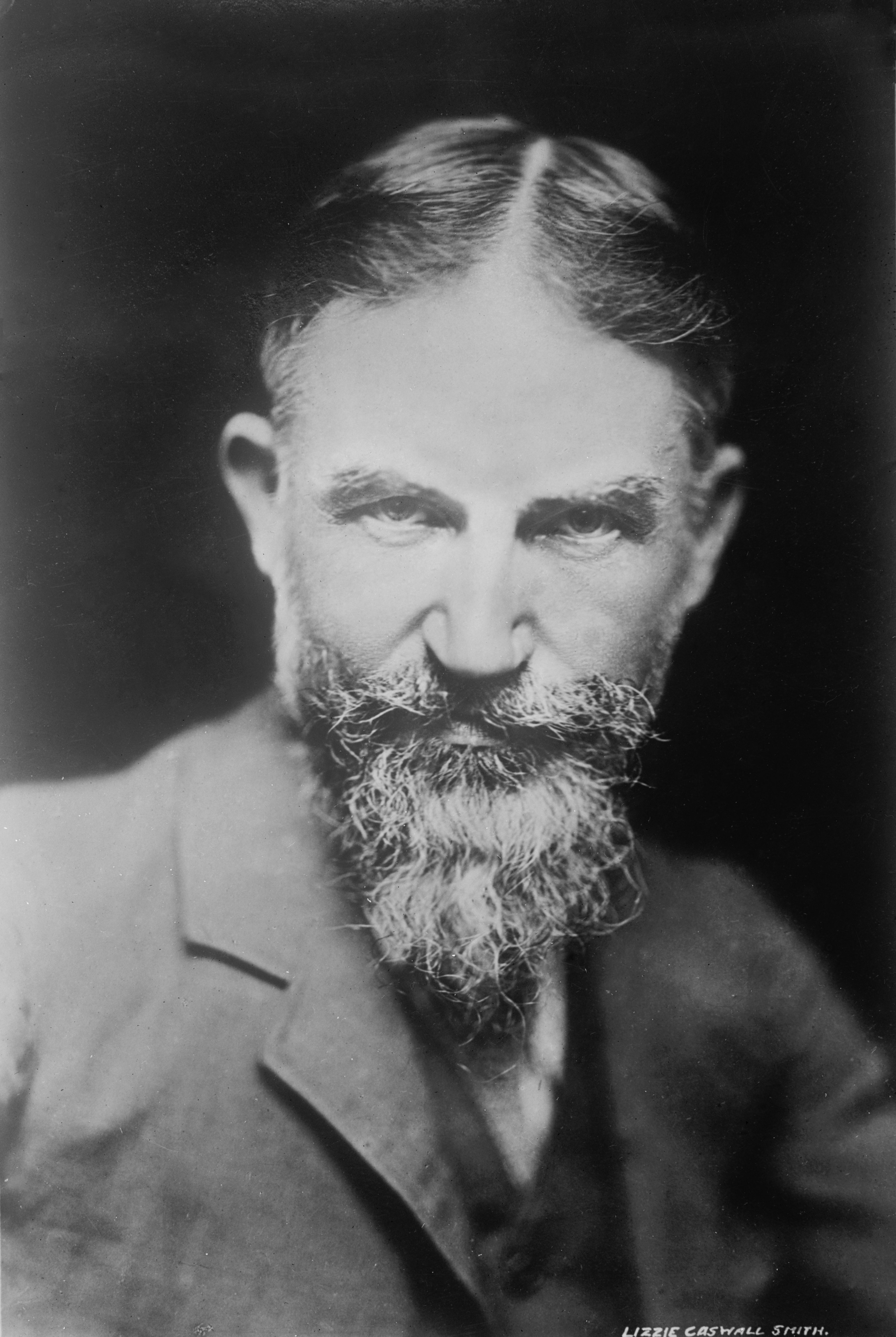
George Bernard Shaw (date between 1900 and 1910)

The Perfect Wagnerite: A Commentary on the Niblung's Ring is an 1898 philosophical commentary on Richard Wagner's Der Ring des Nibelungen by the Irish playwright George Bernard Shaw. (Note: Shaw himself subtitled his work with the term "Niblung" rather than using the more common English form "Nibelung".) Originally published London, Shaw offered it to those enthusiastic admirers of Wagner who "were unable to follow his ideas, and do not in the least understand the dilemma of Wotan." According to Shaw:

I write this pamphlet for the assistance of those who wish to be introduced to the work on equal terms with that inner circle of adepts...The reason is that its dramatic moments lie quite outside the consciousness of people whose joys and sorrows are all domestic and personal, and whose religions and political ideas are purely conventional and superstitious. To them it is a struggle between half a dozen fairytale personages for a ring, involving hours of scolding and cheating, and one long scene in a dark gruesome mine, with gloomy, ugly music, and not a glimpse of a handsome young man or pretty woman. Only those of wider consciousness can follow it breathlessly, seeing in it the whole tragedy of human history and the whole horror of the dilemmas from which the world is shrinking today.

Shaw interprets the Ring in Marxian terms as an allegory of the collapse of capitalism from its internal contradictions. Musicologically, his interpretation is noteworthy for its perception of the change in aesthetic direction beginning with the final scene of Siegfried, in which he claimed that the cycle turns from Musikdrama back towards opera.
