= The Fascinating Foundling =

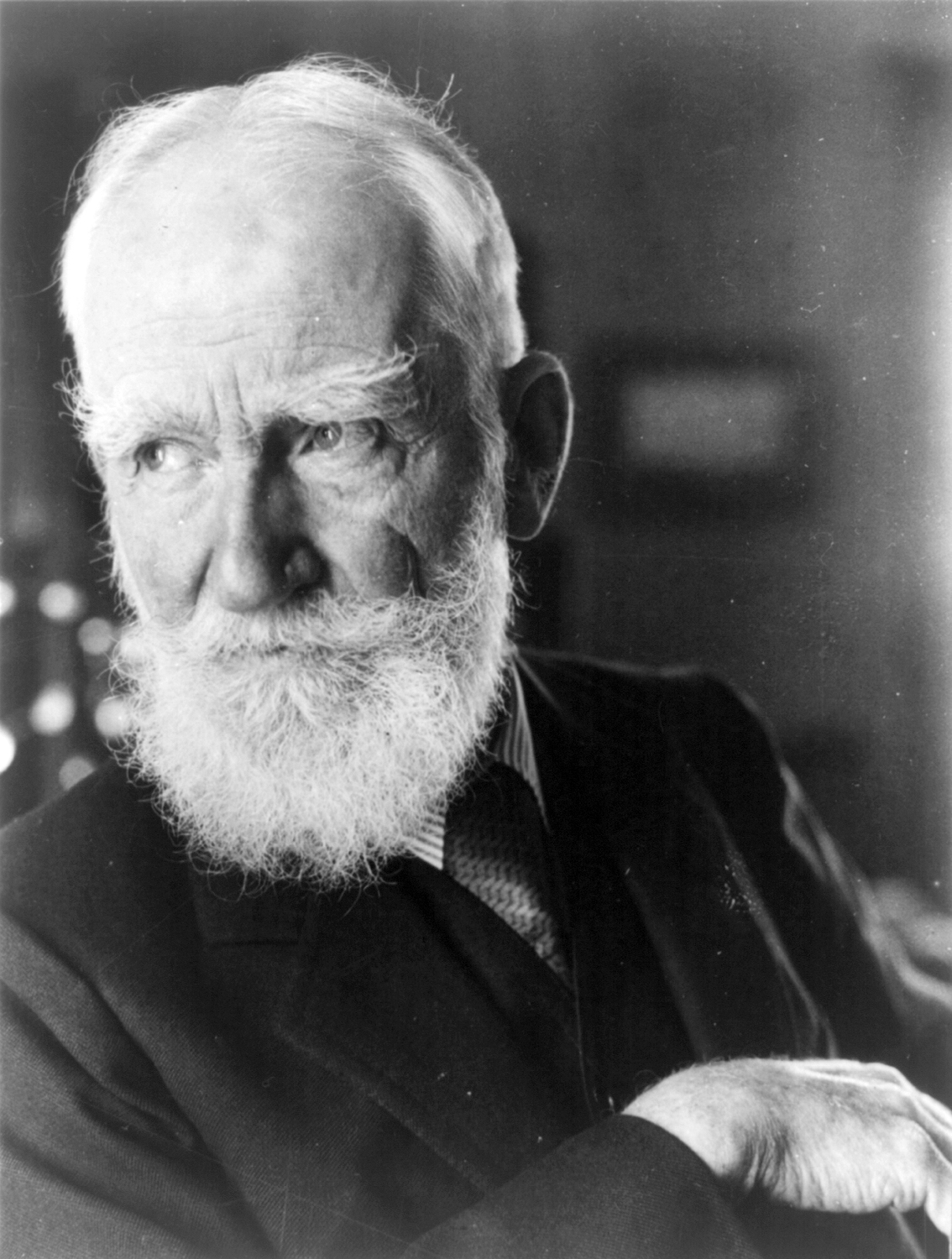
- Original language: English
- Written by: George Bernard Shaw
- Subject: Foundlings demand parenting from the Lord Chancellor
- Genre: "tomfoolery"
- Setting: The office of the Lord Chancellor

Premiere
- Date: 1909 (amateur); January 1928 (professional)
- Place: Arts Theatre (1928 production)

The Fascinating Foundling (1909) is a short comic play by George Bernard Shaw. Shaw classified it as one of his "tomfooleries". He was so unimpressed with his own work that the published text was humorously subtitled "a Disgrace to the Author".

== Characters ==
- Horace Brabazon, a beautiful young man
- Sir Cardonius Boshington, the Lord Chancellor
- Anastasia Vulliamy, a suffragette
- Mercer, an elderly clerk

== Plot ==
Horace Brabazon, an elegant young man, enters the office of the Lord Chancellor, Sir Cardonius Boshington. After a scuffle with Mercer, the Chancellor's faithful clerk, he is granted an interview with the great man. Horace says that he was a foundling who was made ward of the Court. As an orphan, he expects the Chancellor to behave as the father of all orphans who are such wards. He has a duty to find Horace a job and also to find him a suitable wife, someone old enough to mother him. Horace then leaves.

Miss Anastasia Vulliamy, another foundling, appears. A suffragette who has recently been released from prison, she demands to be given a weak-willed husband whom she can dominate. Having forgotten his walking-stick, Horace reappears. Anastasia says he looks just like the kind of man she wants. Horace is reluctant to commit to a relationship, but when he discovers that she is a foundling like himself, he embraces her.

== Production and Publication ==
Shaw wrote the play at his home in Ayot St. Lawrence for Elizabeth Asquith, the 12-year-old daughter of prime minister H. H. Asquith. She wanted a play to produce at a benefit event for a charity. Shaw's friend Archibald Henderson says that she directed a performance of it by child actors. 'This play, Shaw informed me, was given by a group of children under the direction of Princess Bibesco [Elizabeth Asquith's later married name], but he was unable to recall either place or date.' It was first played professionally by the Arts Theatre Club in January 1928, running for forty-four performances.

It was published in 1926 in the collection Translations and Tomfooleries.

== Critical views ==
Critic Homer E. Woodbridge says that the play is so bad that Shaw 'properly' subtitled it with the phrase that 'best described' it: 'a disgrace to the author'. Woodbridge adds, '"The Fascinating Foundling" and "The Music Cure", another topical skit dealing with the Marconi scandal, vie in flatness with "Passion, Poison and Petrifaction"; both are really beneath criticism.' Shaw himself seems to have taken much the same view, writing in a letter to Lillah McCarthy, 'I can't stand The Fascinating Foundling'.
