= The Music Cure =

1913 comedy sketch by George Bernard Shaw

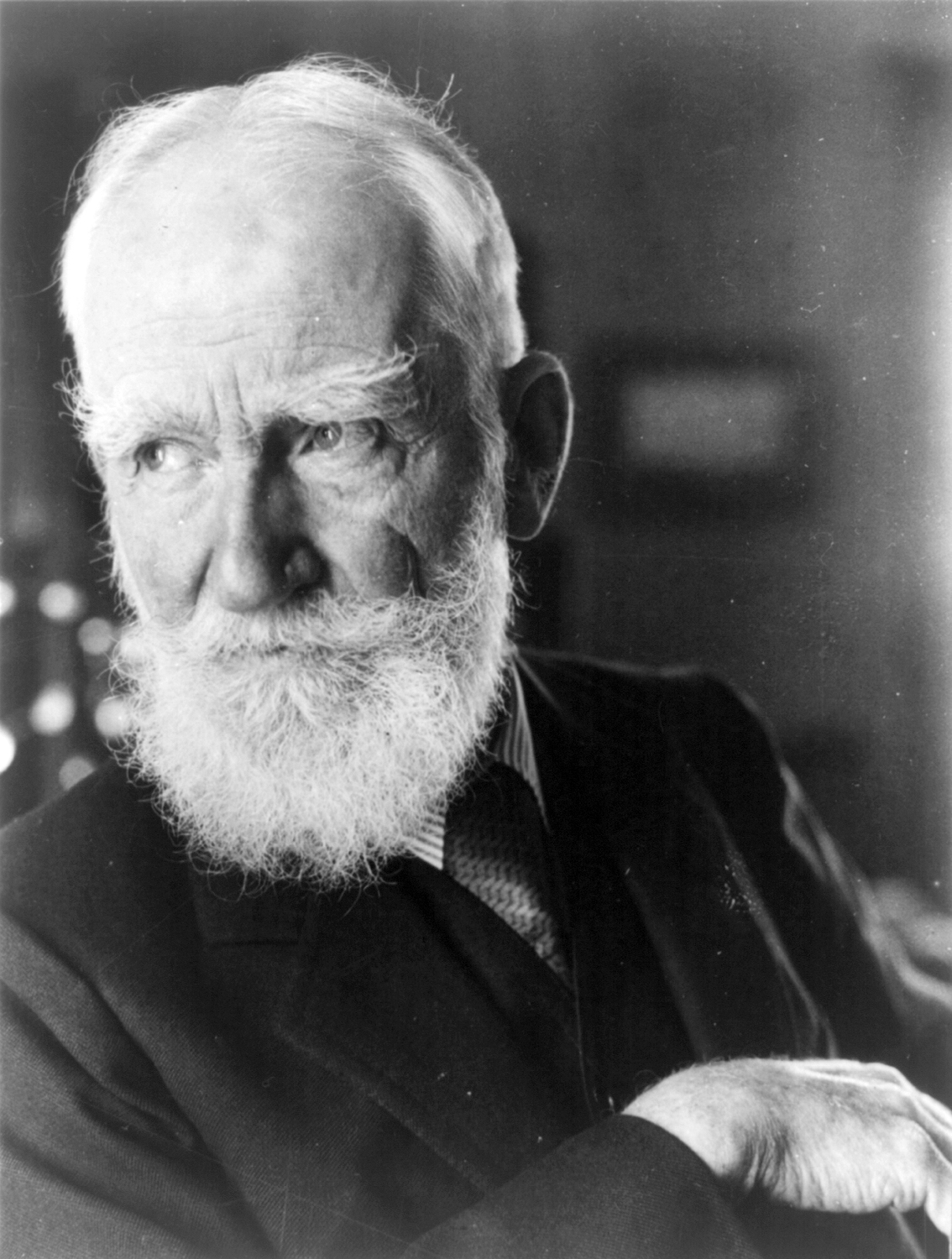
- Original language: English
- Written by: George Bernard Shaw
- Subject: A weak-willed politician falls in love with a domineering pianist
- Genre: satire
- Setting: "A hotel drawing room"

Premiere
- Date: 28 January 1914
- Place: Little Theatre in the Adelphi, London

The Music Cure, a Piece of Utter Nonsense (1913) is a short comedy sketch by George Bernard Shaw, satirising therapeutic fads of the era and the Marconi scandal of 1912.

== Characters ==
- Lord Reginald Fitzambey
- Dr Dawkins
- Strega Thundridge

== Plot ==
Lord Reginald Fitzambey, Under-Secretary of State for War, is in a distressed state. He explains to his doctor that, knowing the British army would soon be put on a vegetarian diet, he bought shares in the Macaroni Trust. Brought before a parliamentary committee for profiteering, Fitzambey had tried to explain that macaroni was a normal investment. Now he is highly sensitised to anything distressing.

His doctor prescribes rest and offers him opium pills. A woman starts to play the piano, causing Reginald to scream. The woman turns out to be famous pianist Strega Thundridge, employed by Reginald's mother at considerable cost to play in the room for two hours to soothe Reginald's nerves. Although Strega can hear Reginald screaming, she continues to play.

Reginald finds himself powerfully attracted to her, but when he tries to make a pass at her, she starts playing Chopin, causing Reginald convulsions. She then restores his vitality with a stirring Polonaise. Reginald, who adores dominant women, is now hopelessly in love with Strega. He begs her to marry him so she can dominate him completely. She accepts, having always dreamed of meeting a man who was utterly in thrall to her.

== Production and reception ==
Shaw said that the piece was not intended as a 'serious play' but was rather 'what is called a variety turn for two musicians.' It was first performed at the Little Theatre in London as curtain raiser to G. K. Chesterton's first play, Magic, on 28 January 1914.

Shaw had pushed Chesterton into writing a play. In Magic, a character comments on the Marconi Company, which is a reference to the fact that Chesterton's brother had been prosecuted for libel during the Marconi scandal after he criticised government ministers for making allegedly corrupt deals in Marconi shares. Hence Shaw refers to 'Macaroni' [sic] shares in his own short play.

Shaw felt that the play was a disaster, saying in a letter to Lillah McCarthy that it was 'abominable trash' and 'simply unbearable' to watch in performance. Critic Homer E. Woodbridge says that the play is one of Shaw's worst: '"The Fascinating Foundling" and "The Music Cure", another topical skit dealing with the Marconi scandal, vie in flatness with "Passion, Poison and Petrifaction"; both are really beneath criticism.'

The play was made into an opera by Philip Hagemann (1984).

In 2021, Misalliance Repertory Theatre, a Chicago-based company, released a radio-play version of The Music Cure, which is available free to the public via the company's website, MisallianceRepertory.org.
