= Geneva (play) =

Play by George Bernard Shaw (1938)

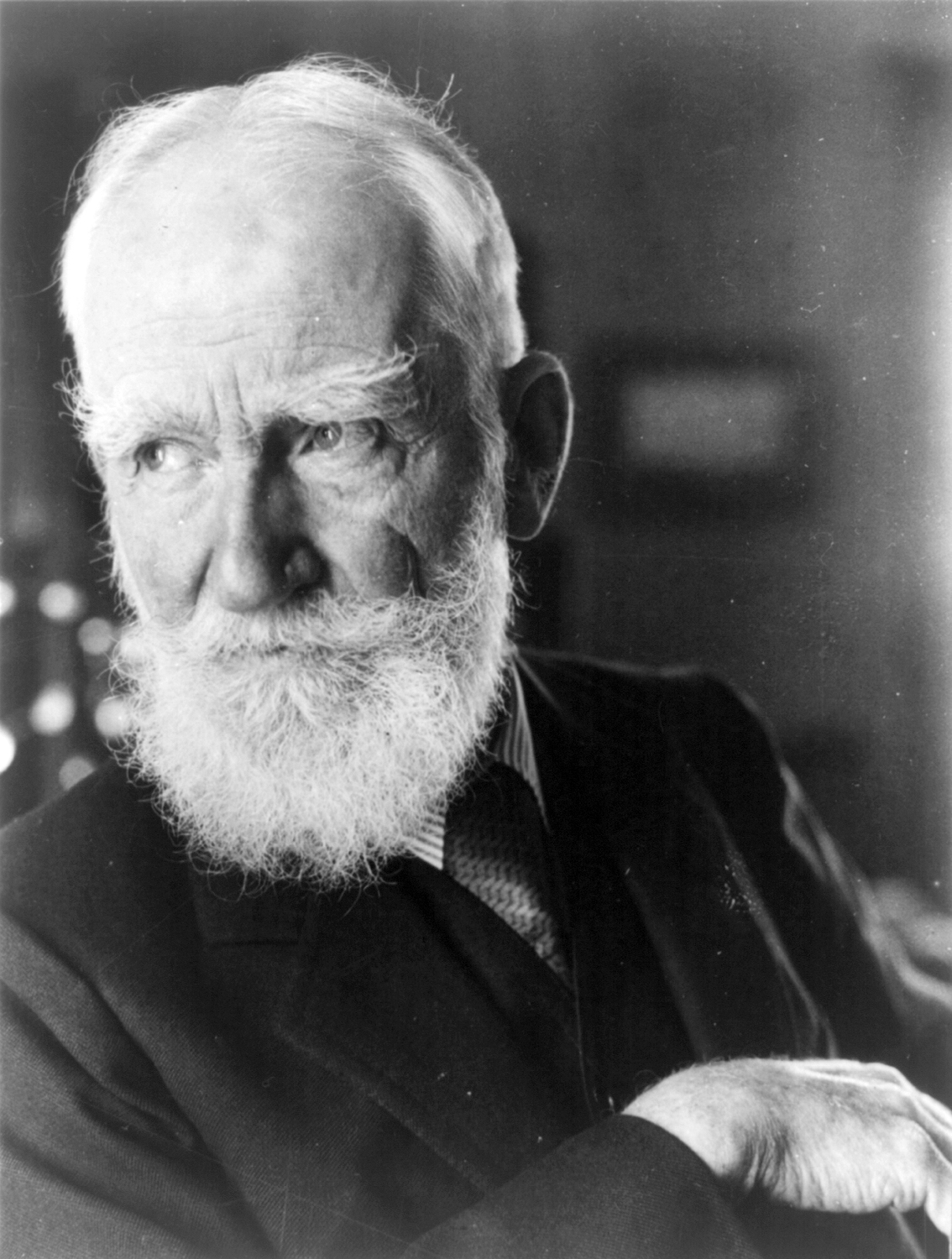
- Original language: English
- Written by: George Bernard Shaw
- Subject: Fascist dictators are brought to court
- Genre: political satire
- Setting: Geneva in the 1930s

Premiere
- Date: 25 July 1938, (in Polish translation); 1 August 1938, (in original English)
- Place: Teatr Polski, Warsaw (Polish); Malvern Festival (English)

Geneva, a Fancied Page of History in Three Acts (1938) is a topical play by George Bernard Shaw. It describes a summit meeting designed to contain the increasingly dangerous behaviour of three dictators, Herr Battler, Signor Bombardone, and General Flanco (parodies of Adolf Hitler, Benito Mussolini and Francisco Franco).

Because of its topicality in the run up to World War II, the play was constantly rewritten by Shaw to take account of rapidly changing events. Though initially a success, the play's flippant portrayal of Hitler and fascism have limited revivals in later years.

== Plot ==
At the offices of the "Committee of Intellectual Cooperation" in Geneva, the only person present is a hopelessly overwhelmed secretary called Miss Begonia Brown. Various people turn up demanding redress of grievances: a Jew who complains of oppression in Germany; a colonial politician who had been denied the right to take his seat and a South American woman who objects to the politics of assassinations and vendettas. A British vicar and a Russian Bolshevik also complain about the respective influence of their competing ideologies. The vicar promptly dies of shock after realising he has been friendly with a Communist. The Jew says that the major culprits are the fascist dictators Battler, Bombardone and Flanco. He suggests that they should contact the International Court in The Hague, which the secretary does. A Dutch judge accepts the case, summoning Battler, Bombardone and Flanco to the court.

To everyone's amazement the dictators all obey the summons. They are put on trial, which is broadcast internationally on television. Battler, Bombardone, and Flanco all defend themselves with grandiose speeches. The judge comments, "It turns out that we do not and cannot love one another—that the problem before us is how to establish peace among people who heartily dislike one another, and have very good reasons for doing so: in short, that the human race does not at present consist exclusively or even largely of likeable persons". Sir Orpheus Midlander, the British Foreign Secretary, threatens Battler that if Germany invades another country, Britain will take military action.

As the situation seems to be escalating, news arrives that the earth has jumped out of its orbit and all humanity is threatened with freezing to death. Political differences no longer seem significant but now all the leaders have a different plan to deal with the problem—or to ignore it. It is soon discovered that the report was false. Will this moment of shared, albeit illusory, danger help to bring the nations together? It is doubtful but the play ends on a note of hope: "They came, these fellows. They blustered: they defied us. But they came. They came."

== Creation ==
Shaw's friend and biographer Archibald Henderson says that he had suggested to Shaw that he could write a play about Mussolini, saying "It may be that Shaw was thereby influenced to consider all the totalitarian leaders and dictators brought together into a single play." The play's British ambassador is a composite figure based on British politicians of the day, including the aristocratic Eric Drummond, 16th Earl of Perth and the brothers Austen Chamberlain and Neville Chamberlain. According to Henderson,

Geneva was the inevitable and logical outcome of his studies of the League of Nations. Two of the leading characters, the secretary of the League and Sir Orpheus Midlander, are drawn from his observation of Sir Eric Drummond and the two Chamberlains as a composite statesman. The actor, Ernest Thesiger, who played the rôle of Sir Orpheus Midlander, bore a striking resemblance in make-up to Sir Austen Chamberlain.

Shaw spent two years working on and revising the play after first drafting it in 1936. An early version was sent to Lawrence Langner of the Theatre Guild in New York. Langner was not impressed, and refused to put on the play. He was especially dismayed by Shaw's apparently sympathetic attitude to the dictators. He wrote, "Your influence has been exactly the opposite of that of the dictators...Yet you seem to justify Fascism with its intolerance, racial hatred, economic slavery, fanning of the war spirit...mainly on the ground that...Dictators are 'supermen', and the supermen 'get things done'." Shaw said he had already rewritten it to adopt as more critical stance: "Musso let me down completely by going anti-Semite on me...you may now put the copy I sent you in the fire as useless." As political events unfolded, Shaw had to constantly rewrite the play. According to Michael Holroyd, in the end "Geneva was played and printed in eight different versions".

== Productions ==
It was first performed at the Teatr Polski in Warsaw on 25 July 1938, in a Polish language translation. Its first British production was at the Malvern Festival on 1 August 1938. Shaw wrote a pamphlet to accompany the Malvern production. The cast for the 1938 British premiere comprised:

- Begonia Brown – Eileen Beldon
- Jew – Donald Eccles
- Newcomer – Maitland Moss
- Widow – Phyllis Gill
- Journalist – Wilson Barrett
- Bishom – H. R. Hignett
- Commissar – J. O. Twiss
- Secretary – Cyril Gardiner
- Sir Orpheus Midlander – Ernest Thesiger
- Betrothed – Kenneth Villiers
- Judge – Donald Woolfitt
- Bombardone – Cecil Trouncer
- Battlet – Norman Wooland
- Deaconess – Marie Ault
- Flanco – R. Stuart Lindsell

A London production opened on 22 November 1938, with more added scenes. The topicality of the themes, with war looming, attracted audiences and the play ran for 237 performances, closing in mid-June 1939.

Shaw revised the play again for a performance in New York in January 1940, but the atmosphere had changed with war now a reality. According to Stanley Weintraub the jokey and flippant manner did not work for audiences, "the caricatures were no longer clever – if they ever had been so....it was an immediate flop."

== Responses ==
Beatrice Webb disliked what she heard when Shaw read passages from a draft of Geneva in 1936, writing "every character depraved in morals and manners and futile in intellect, with here and there a dull dissertation on public affairs". When she saw it on stage, she changed her mind, noting, "the play has come at the best possible occasion: it relieves the terrible tension that we all feel about foreign affairs by laughing at every one concerned." Homer Woodbridge says that "As a dramatized pamphlet or tract, the piece points in too many directions to be effective", but the caricature of Mussolini is witty and convincing. Both parliamentarian and fascist politics are caricatured, with only the Dutch judge representing reason. However, in line with Shaw's pro-Stalinist views, the Russian Commissar is portrayed without satire.

G. A. Pileki notes that early reviewers took the view that Shaw was far too soft on the dictators, being "overly critical of the British and generally sympathetic toward the dictators", but that after the war stated a production in New York was interpreted as "a British propaganda mission." Examining Shaw's revisions to his drafts of the play Pileki concludes that Shaw intentionally made the dictators' cases more rational in order to create a more balanced version of his typical "Shavian dialectic". In the early version the Jew and Battler have an argument in which the Jew claims to represent an intellectually superior, educated people, while Battler maintains that he wants to eliminate sub-humans, poisonous vermin and Jews. In the final version Battler says he was only trying to remove foreigners from his country, comparing his plans to the White Australia policy that was accepted in the British empire.

=== Preface ===
Shaw wrote his preface to the play ten years later in 1946, after World War II was over. He looked back on his portrayal of the failings of both dictators and of parliamentary democracy, reaffirming his often-repeated view that "Civilization's will to live [is] always defeated by democracy", arguing for a form of technocratic and meritocratic government. He said that Hitler had proved to be "a pseudo-Messiah and madman".
