= The Glimpse of Reality =

1909 play by George Bernard Shaw

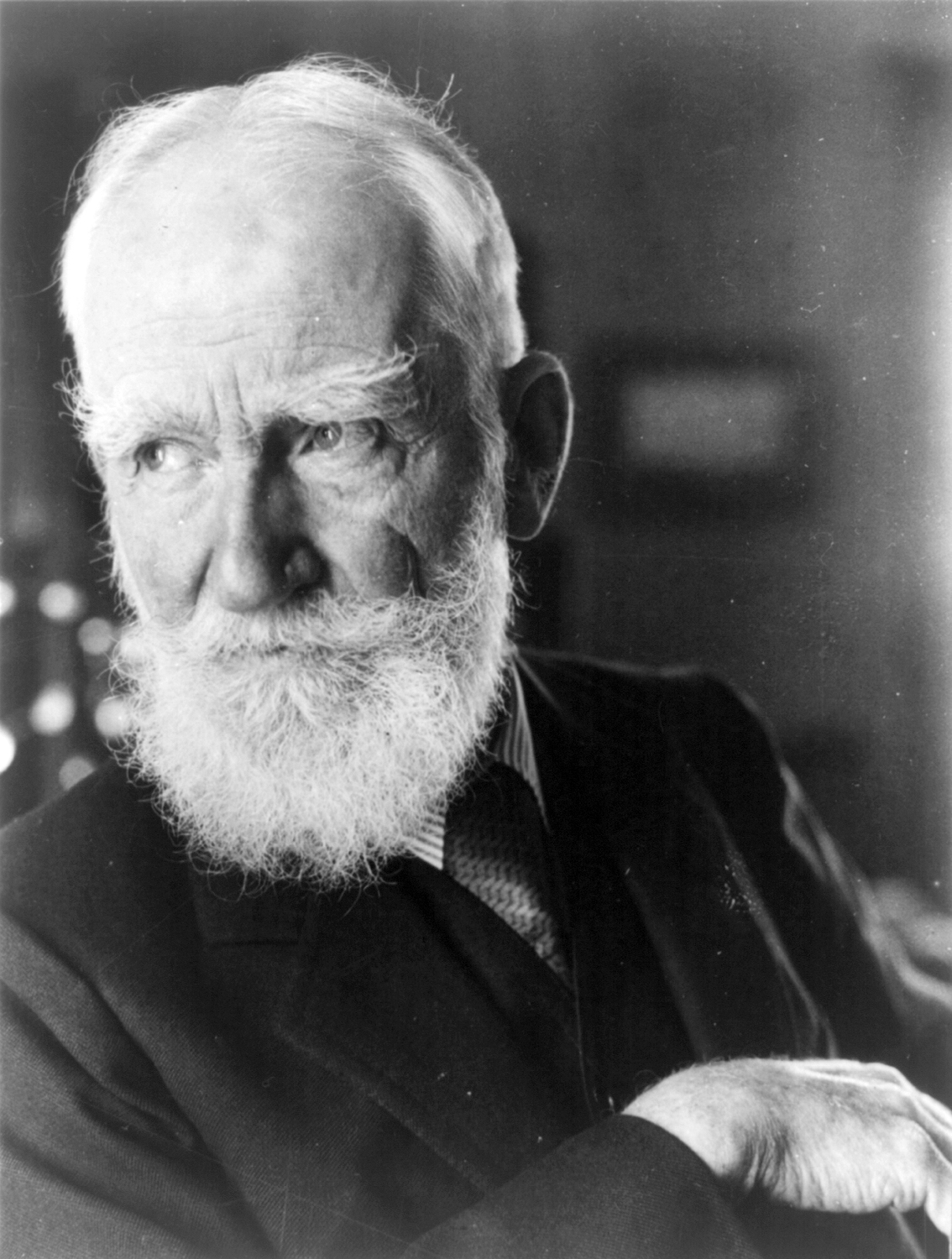
- Original language: English
- Written by: George Bernard Shaw
- Subject: A medieval Count is waylaid by murderers
- Genre: satire of historical melodrama
- Setting: An inn on the edge of an Italian lake

Premiere
- Date: 20 November 1927
- Place: Arts Theatre, London

The Glimpse of Reality, A Tragedietta (1909) is a short play by George Bernard Shaw, set in Italy during the 15th century. It is a parody of the verismo melodramas in vogue at the time. Shaw included it among what he called his "tomfooleries".

== Characters ==
- Count Ferruccio, a philandering aristocrat
- Giulia, a beautiful peasant
- Squarcio, Giulia's father, a murderer
- Sandro, Giulia's lover, a fisherman and assistant murderer

== Plot ==
Fifteenth century Italy, an inn: Giulia, a beautiful peasant girl, tells a friar that she is about to commit a sin so that she can obtain the money she needs to marry her beloved Sandro, a fisherman. When she mentions Count Ferruccio, a notorious womaniser, the friar assumes that she has agreed to sleep with him for the money, and cheerfully comments that she could not sin with a better young fellow. But Giulia says that the sin is far worse. She has agreed to lure the Count to the inn with the promise of sex, where her father Squarcio, a professional assassin, is waiting to murder him.

The friar reveals himself to be the Count in disguise, and exposes the hidden Squarcio. He tells Squarcio that if he is killed it will bring down the revenge of the local Baron, who has made bet with the count's father that he could catch any murderer. Squarcio says he'll make the Count's death look like an accident, but for that he'll need assistance. He decides they should have dinner first, and promises there will be no attempt at poisoning.

At dinner, the Count and Squarcio discuss issues of class and crime. The Count says he will buy Giulia from her father, generously offering her back for free when he gets fed up with her. When this does not work, he offers to marry her. She refuses. The Count is dismayed that he, a nobleman, will be killed by such lowlife peasants. Giulia replies that he's already living off peasants, so why shouldn't he die by them? She will help to rid the world of a parasite. The Count proclaims that he has been living a fantasy-life, but now, confronted by death, he sees reality for the first time. Squarcio leaves to get Sandro.

Squarcio and Sandro enter. The Count determines to fight to the end, attacking the "dog of a bandit" Squarcio. He stabs Squarcio, but the blade just breaks on Squarcio's chain-mail. He expounds his new philosophy to the bemused killers, then Sandro throws a fishing net over the Count. Sandro says they cannot kill him, as he is clearly mad, and it is bad luck to kill the mad. The Count says "My life is only a drop falling from the vanishing clouds to the everlasting sea, from finite to infinite, and itself part of the infinite." This proves his madness for Sandro. They reveal that they were paid to kill him by a Cardinal, whom the Count offended. They will take him to safety if they are rewarded - with a nice wedding present for Giulia. The Count says he will have a painter he knows portray Giulia as Saint Barbara.

== Production ==
Though written in 1909, and revised in the following year, the play was not produced until the 1920s, in part at least because Shaw seems to have mislaid the manuscript. It was first performed by the amateur Glasgow Clarion Players, at the Fellowship Hall, 28 October 1927, for two performances. It was first produced professionally in London at the Arts Theatre Club, on 20 November 1927. Ferruccio was played by Harcourt Williams; Giulia was Elissa Landi; Squarco Harold B. Meade and Sandro Terence O'Brien.

== Critical views ==
Shaw's friend Archibald Henderson described the play as a "macabre Italian picture of the fifteenth century--with sharp contrasts and sudden emotional changes, setting the romantic ideas derived from literature over against the bold lusts and cold cupidities of life." The play parodies the conventions of historical melodramas and popular operas of the era, with the typical rationalism of Shavian conversations set against the cliches of Italian operatic dramas. Michael Holroyd says that though Shaw included it among his "tomfooleries" paired with The Fascinating Foundling, the threatening tone makes it "a more sombre tomfoolery" than the latter.
