= Lady Magnesia =

Opera by Mieczysław Weinberg

- comic opera by Mieczysław Weinberg
- Native title: Russian: Леди Магнезия
- Librettist: Weinberg
- Language: Russian
- Based on: Passion, Poison and Petrifaction by George Bernard Shaw

Lady Magnesia (Russian: Леди Магнезия, Ledi Magneziya, Op. 112) is a 1975 comic opera by Mieczysław Weinberg to his own Russian libretto after the 1905 play Passion, Poison and Petrifaction by George Bernard Shaw. To celebrate Weinberg's 90th birthday in 2009, the opera was performed along with several of his works including his 1997 "Requiem." While engaged in the writing of the opera, Weinberg invited Soviet composer David Krivitsky to his home to play the music, of which an analysis was included in his book, "One-act opera of the 20th century."
