= Augustus Does His Bit =

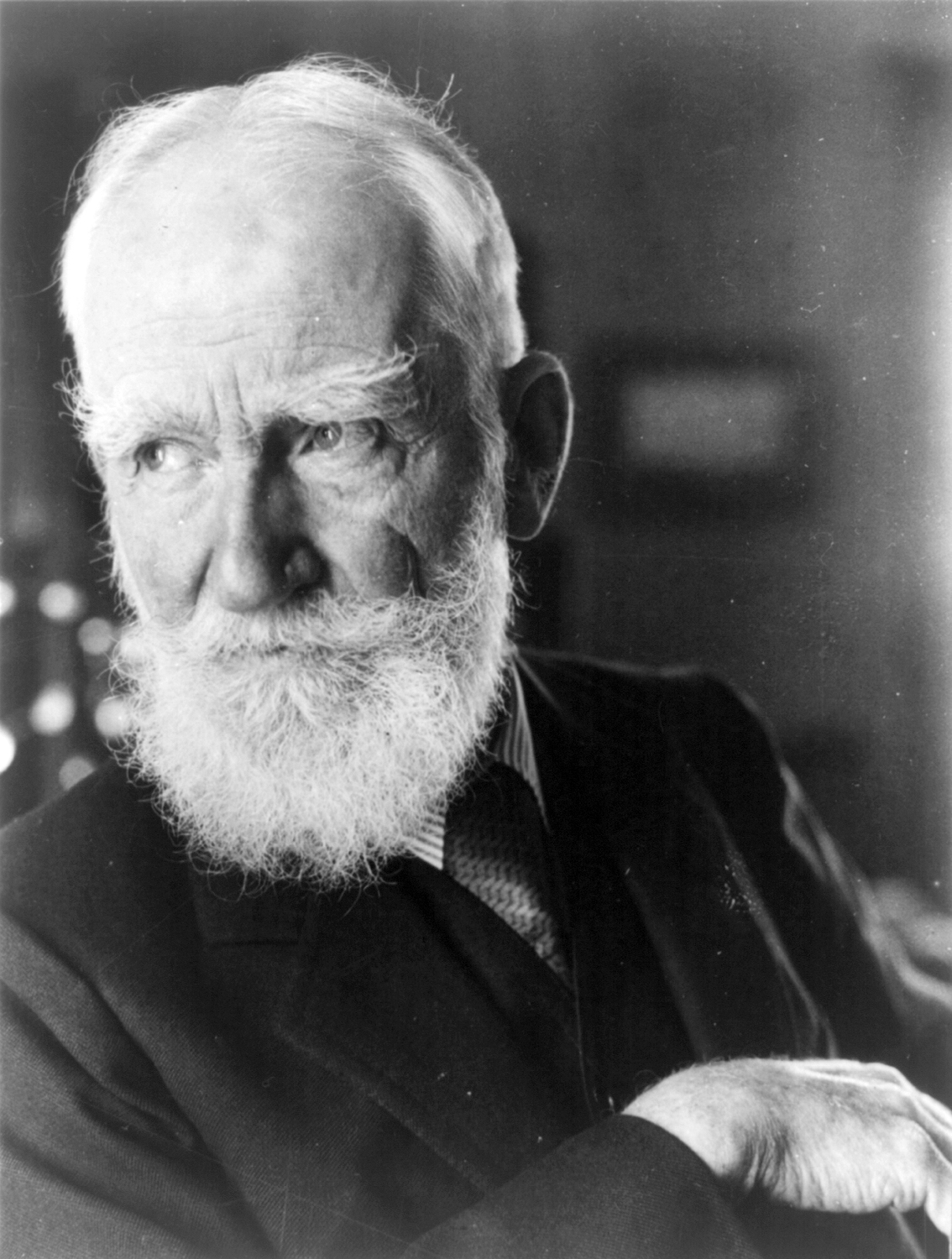
- Written by: George Bernard Shaw
- Original language: English
- Subject: A self-important aristocrat is outwitted by a female spy
- Genre: satire

Premiere
- Date premiered: 21 January 1917
- Place premiered: Court Theatre, London

Augustus Does His Bit: A True-to-Life Farce (1916) is a comic one-act play by George Bernard Shaw about a dim-witted aristocrat who is outwitted by a female spy during World War I.

== Characters ==
- Lord Augustus Highcastle
- Horatio Beamish
- A Lady

== Plot ==
In the small town of Little Pifflington, Lord Augustus Highcastle tells his secretary Horatio Beamish that the war is a very serious matter, especially as he has three German brothers-in-law. He soon learns that a female spy is after an important document in his possession. A glamorous woman visits him. After flattering him by saying how important he is, she tells him that she suspects her sister-in-law of being the spy. She explains that Augustus' brother, known as "Blueloo", has made a bet that Augustus can be easily tricked, and intends to use this woman to prove it. If she can get the document, a list of British gun emplacements, and take it to "Blueloo", Augustus's incompetence will be exposed.

Beamish enters holding the document, which Augustus had left on a coffee table in the hotel. The lady manages to switch the document for a fake one and leaves. Having secured the document before witnesses, she returns to telephone the War Office. She tells "Blueloo" that she easily outwitted Lord Augustus. Augustus then realises that she was the spy and the document he has is a fake.

== Production and reception ==
The play was produced on 21 January 1917, at the Court theatre for the Stage Society. Like its predecessor The Inca of Perusalem it was originally presented anonymously, advertised as a "play in one Act by the author of The Inca of Perusalem." Shaw commented that some critics were not pleased by the satire of the war effort: "The shewing up of Augustus scandalized one or two innocent and patriotic critics, who regarded the prowess of the British Army as inextricably bound up with Highcastle prestige, but our Government Departments knew better. Their problem was how to win the war with Augustus on their backs, well meaning, brave, patriotic, but obstructively fussy, selfimportant and imbecile." The play contains several typical Shavian themes: women outwitting men and the incompetence of the aristocratic ruling class, most notably. The references to the aristocracy's German family connections corresponds with the views Shaw expressed in his booklet Common Sense about the War.
