= The Interlude at the Playhouse =

Play by George Bernard Shaw

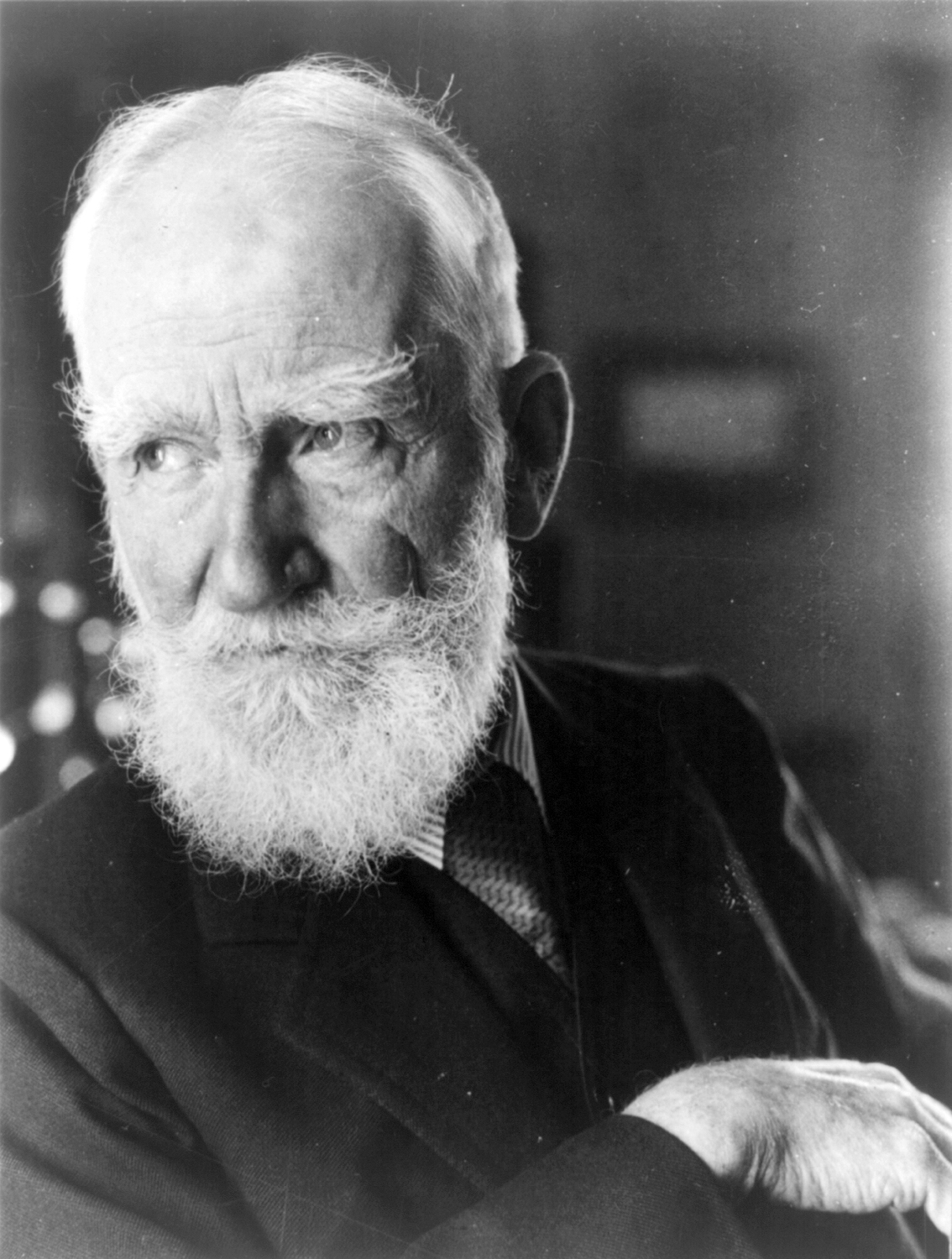
- Original language: English
- Written by: George Bernard Shaw
- Subject: An actor's wife pleads with the audience to be kind to her husband
- Genre: curtain raiser
- Setting: The Playhouse Theatre

Premiere
- Date: 28 January 1907
- Place: Playhouse Theatre

The Interlude at the Playhouse (1907) is a short comic sketch written by George Bernard Shaw to be delivered by Cyril Maude and his wife Winifred Emery as a curtain raiser at the opening of The Playhouse, a newly renovated theatre managed by Maude. The sketch was performed on Monday, 28 January 1907.

== Characters ==
- Mrs Goldsmith, the Manager's wife
- Edwin Goldsmith, the Manager
- Carpenter
- Conductor
- Stage Manager

== Plot ==
Maude (as "Edwin Goldsmith") is an actor-manager who has to give a speech to the audience on the opening of a new theatre. He is so nervous that his wife has to appeal to the audience behind his back to be kind to him when he appears. Other members of the theatre company are getting anxious about the delay. Goldsmith has prepared an interminable speech outlining the history of the location going back to Domesday Book. His wife is anxious that they should start the play "Pickles", but Edwin says he is bored with it and wants to play Hamlet. Eventually he is persuaded to finish his speech. He tells the audience, "I have dealt with our little play-house in its historical aspect. I have dealt with it in its political aspect, in its financial aspect, in its artistic aspect, in its social aspect, in its County Council aspect, in its biological and psychological aspects." He leaves, irritated, when the band start to play, undercutting his serious speech. His wife reminds the audience that drama is not mere entertainment, but has a higher purpose, so though they aim to please, "we will not please you except on terms honourable to ourselves and to you."

== Background ==
Shaw's West End début had been at the Royal Avenue Theatre with Arms and the Man in 1894. It was successful enough to allow him to discontinue music criticism to focus full-time on play writing. The Royal Avenue Theatre was closed and rebuilt between 1905 and 1907, to be reopened as "The Playhouse". It opened with showings of new plays. The evening of the opening included a new one-act play by Austin Strong called The Drums of Oudh and an already-successful play called Toddles, a translation of a work by Tristan Bernard and Andre Godferneaux. Shaw's sketch was performed as a curtain raiser for the main piece Toddles (pastiched as "Pickles").

== Publication ==
The text of the sketch was published in The Daily Mail on 29 January 1907. It was later republished by Cyril Maude in his memoir Lest I Forget (1928) in his chapter on the opening of the theatre. It was included among Shaw's minor works in a 1951 edition after his death.

== Reviews ==
The sketch was apparently the hit of the night's entertainments, described by the Times as "the clou of the evening". The programme did not advertise it as a dramatic piece, but stated "Mr. Cyril Maude, 'supported' by Miss Wilfred Emery, will 'address the audience'".

Archibald Henderson, Shaw's friend and biographer, calls it a "dainty little interlude", and says that "The genuine delicacy and lightness of touch with which the situation is handled, and the absence of Shavian intrusiveness, unite in making of the interlude a little gem, quite perfect of its kind."
