= Beauty's Duty =

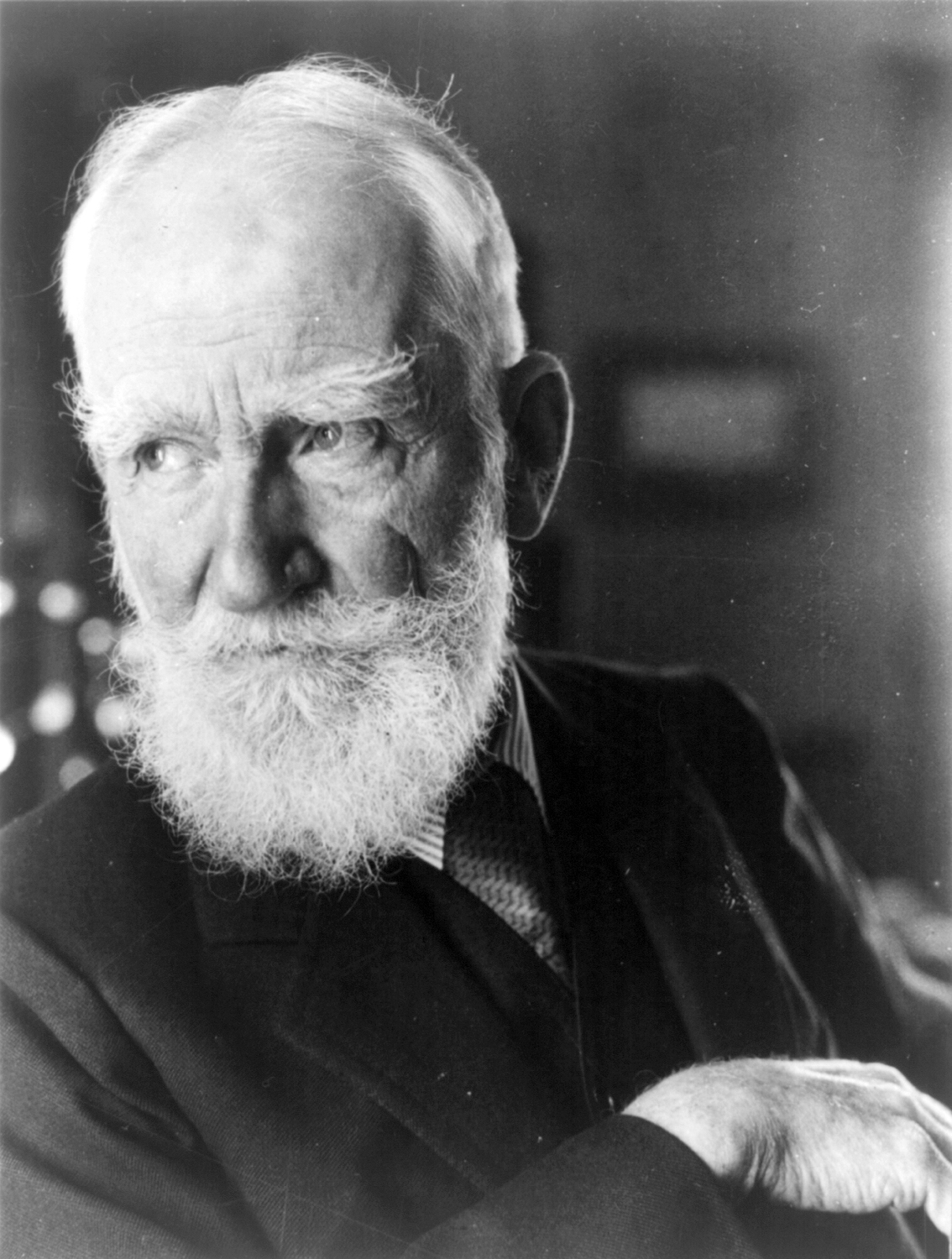
- Written by: George Bernard Shaw
- Original language: English
- Subject: A man is outraged by his wife's views on love
- Genre: comedy of manners
- Setting: A solicitor's office

Premiere
- Date premiered: unperformed

Beauty's Duty (1913) is a short uncompleted "playlet" by George Bernard Shaw. It is a dialogue between a man and his lawyer about the man's wife. The husband has traditional views on marriage. The wife is more idiosyncratic in her thinking.

== Characters ==
- Husband
- Solicitor
- Solicitor's clerk

== Plot ==
The husband tells his lawyer that he needs to legally separate from his wife. The lawyer says he has no grounds for doing so, as his wife appears to have done nothing wrong. The husband says she has some extraordinary ideas. She believes that her beauty and charm are such that men fall in love with her easily. Since she has a talent for making men love her, it would be wrong not to use her talent on as many men as she can.

At this point the solicitor's clerk enters and says that a beautiful woman has just arrived. The solicitor asks who she is, but the clerk says it would have been a violation of her perfection to ask her name. The husband says it must be his wife trying out her "talent" on the clerk.

== Productions ==
In its fragmentary form, the playlet was not intended for stage performance, and was left in an incomplete state. It was not published until 1934. According to A.M. Gibbs the playlet is influenced by the characterisation of Mr. Guppy in Dickens' novel Bleak House.

During World War II the BBC planned to broadcast it in Arabic translation on the radio as part of a promotion of British culture in Arab countries. A writer was commissioned to flesh it out and provide a clear beginning and ending. Shaw was sent the English version of the proposed full text in December 1943. He wrote back in February 1944, apologising for the delay by saying that he must have been "speechless with amazement" that the BBC thought this was suitable: "how anyone with the faintest conception of the difference between Arabia and Bloomsbury could contemplate throwing B's D at the head of a Bedouin passes my understanding". The BBC replied that they were sure it "would have admirably beguiled the Bedouins", but dropped the production.
