= The Inca of Perusalem =

Play by George Bernard Shaw

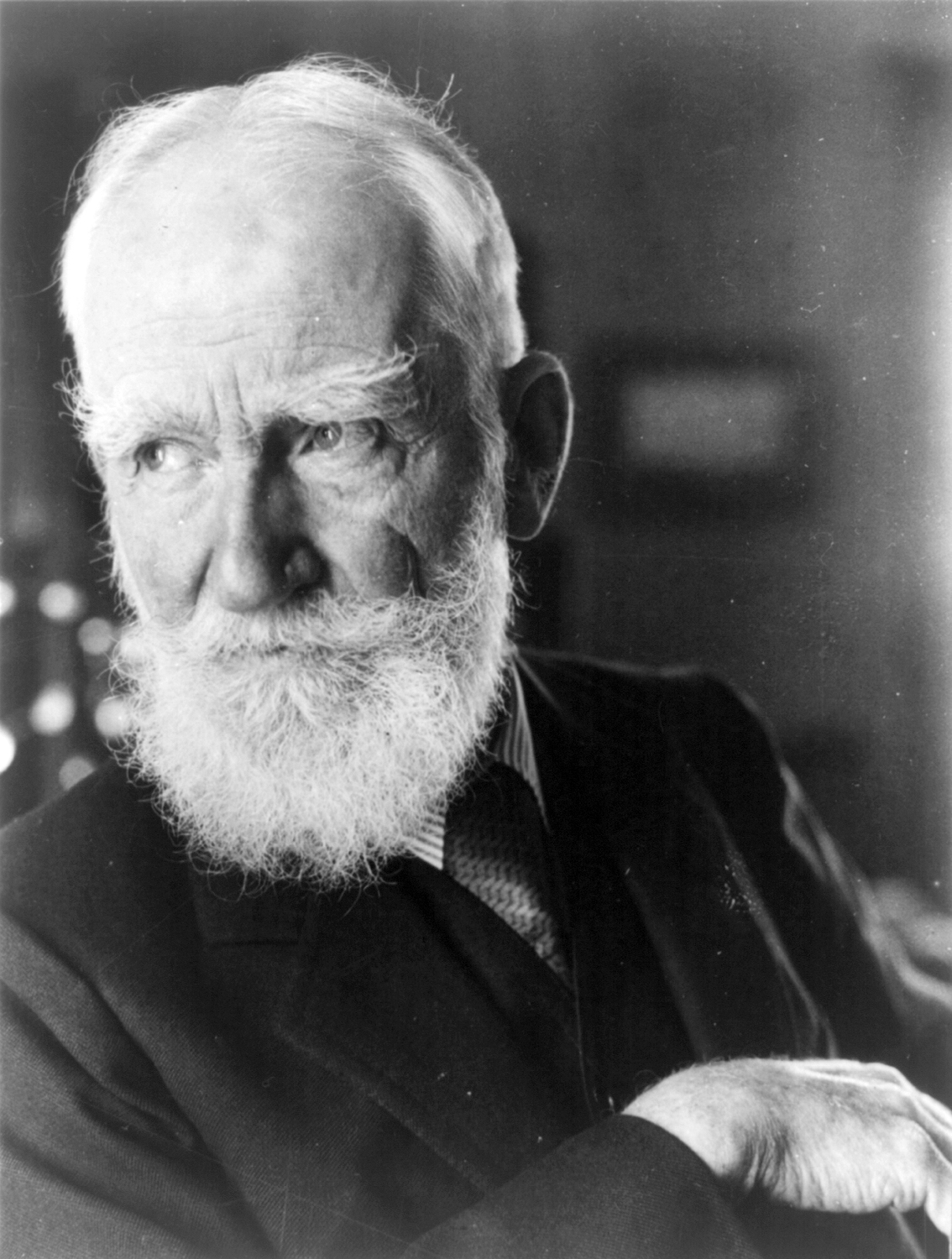
- Original language: English
- Written by: George Bernard Shaw
- Subject: An Inca meets the impoverished widow of a millionaire
- Genre: satire

Premiere
- Date: 7 October 1916
- Place: Birmingham Repertory Theatre

The Inca of Perusalem, An Almost Historical Comedietta (1915) is a comic one-act play written during World War I by George Bernard Shaw. The plot appears at first to be a fairytale-like story about a fantastical "Inca", but it eventually becomes obvious that the Inca is Kaiser Wilhelm II of Germany.

== Characters ==
- Archdeacon
- Ermyntrude
- Princess
- Inca
- Manager
- Waiter

== Plot ==
In a prologue, a character called Ermyntrude says that (though she is the widow of a millionaire) she is now poor, and living on a small income from her father. He is the Archdeacon; he has told her to take a job as a lady's maid, meet another millionaire, and marry back into money.

In a hotel sitting room the Princess is met by the hotel manager. Ermyntrude, now dressed very plainly gets the job as her lady's maid. Captain Duval, a messenger from the "Inca of Perusalem" appears with news that Inca wants one of his sons to marry the Princess. Ermyntrude realises that the messenger is in fact the Inca in disguise. She offers to return the trick, by pretending to be the Princess to find out what his intentions are. The Princess, who is very timid, agrees to let Ermyntrude take charge. Ermyntrude receives the "captain" with an air of great superiority. She is given a gift of a jewel, designed by the Inca, but she is horrified by its size. The Inca is impressed by the "Princess"'s grand manner and reveals his true identity. However, he says that he recognises Ermyntrude. He knows she is the Archdeacon's daughter, not the Princess. But she is so convincing as a princess that now he wishes to marry her himself. Unfortunately he already has a wife, so he suggests they should to convert to Islam so he can legally have another one. Ermyntrude says the Inca is far too poor for her, since his country is going bankrupt because of its foolish war. The Inca says that the war will result in his overthrow and the creation of a republic, but this will not be a problem as he will be elected as "super-president" of the republic. He then says how surprised he is by the popularity of the war in his homeland. He used to rely for popularity on his contributions to art, literature and science, but he was ignored. Now the mass killing in the war leads to cheering crowds. Despite being turned down for marriage, the Inca offers to take Ermyntrude on a drive round the town. She accepts, but emphasises that she will "refuse any incorrect proposals" he makes to her.

== Production and reception ==
The play was first produced at the Birmingham Repertory Theatre in 1916, directed by John Drinkwater, with Gertrude Kingston as Ermyntrude and Felix Aylmer as the Inca. The play was originally presented without Shaw's name attached. The author was described as "a member of the Royal Society of Literature". The original reviewers did not apparently suspect that Shaw was the author. After its publication, Beatrice Webb wrote in her diary that it was not as good as Shaw's earlier play about the war, O'Flaherty V.C.: "O'Flaherty V.C. is a brilliant but serious piece of work--a jewel of a one-act play. The Inca of Perusalem is poor in comparison"

In the preface to the published version, written after the war, Shaw wrote, "I must remind the reader that this playlet was written when its principal character, far from being a fallen foe and virtually a prisoner in our victorious hands, was still the Caesar whose legions we were resisting with our hearts in our mouths. Many were so horribly afraid of him that they could not forgive me for not being afraid of him: I seemed to be trifling heartlessly with a deadly peril....Now that this is all over, and the upshot of the fighting has shown that we could quite well have afforded to laugh at the doomed Inca, I am in another difficulty. I may be supposed to be hitting Caesar when he is down. That is why I preface the play with this reminder that when it was written he was not down."

Critic John Anthony Bertolini says that the play "emphasizes images of disguise and impersonation" as "the sign of Shaw's self-consciousness about the art of playwrighting". All of the characters disguise their true identity. Even the waiter is really an eminent doctor, reduced to work as a waiter because his patients can no longer pay him. The Inca is both a deceiver and deceived, not only by Ermyntrude, but by his own vanity. The play satirises his narcissistic belief that he is an artist, especially in description of the jewellery he gives to Ermyntrude, in which the rim represents a "telephone cable laid by his majesty across the Shipskeel canal" and the pin is "a model in miniature of the sword of Henry the Birdcatcher." The fictional country of "Perusalem" puns on Peru, the home of the actual "Inca", and Prussia (Preussen in German), the kingdom from which Imperial Germany emerged and which was still commonly used as a synonym for it.
