= Annajanska, the Bolshevik Empress =

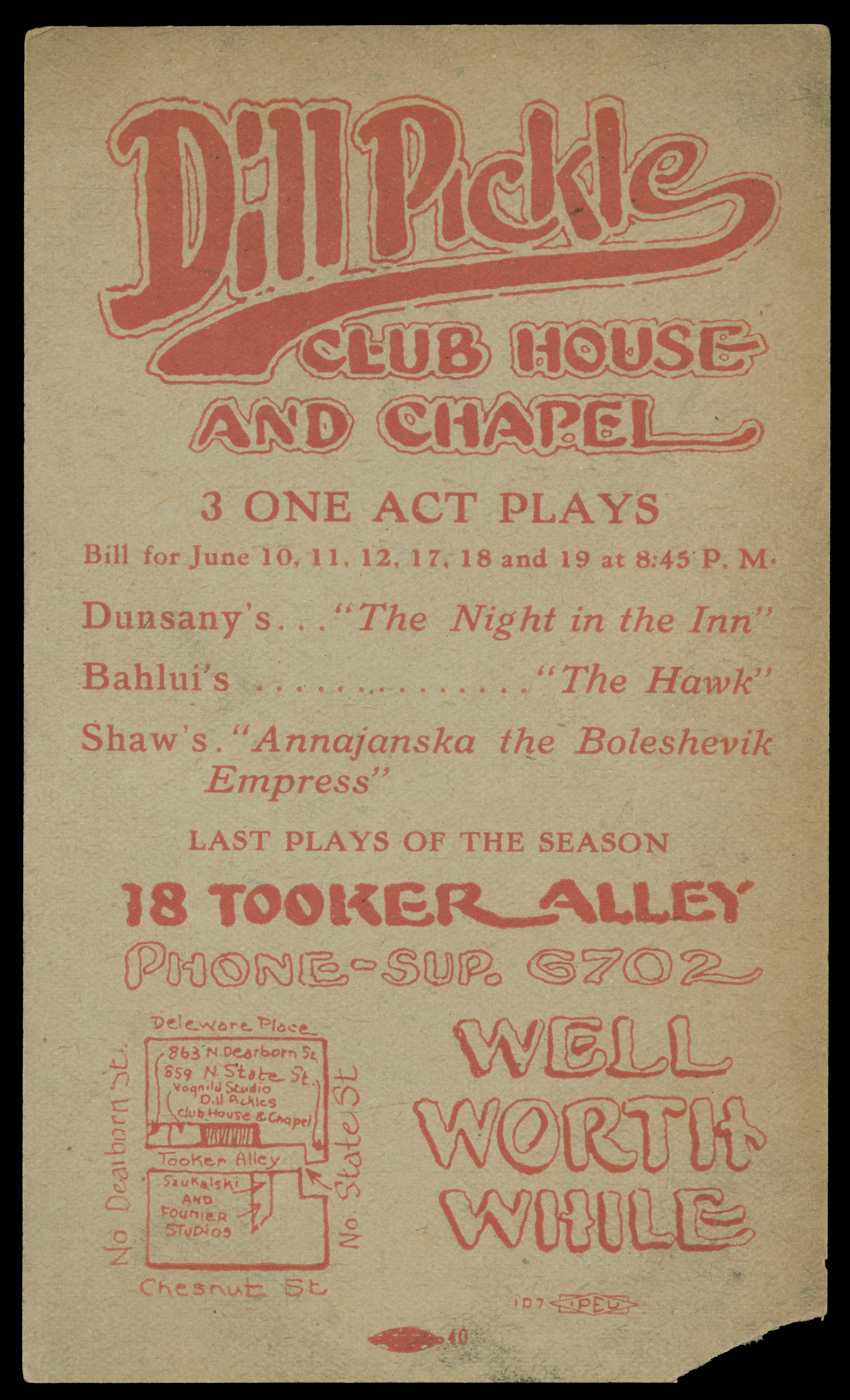
- Poster for a performance at the Dill Pickle Club, Chicago, 1927
- Written by: George Bernard Shaw
- Original language: English
- Subject: A princess becomes a revolutionary
- Genre: comedy of ideas
- Setting: A General's office in Boetia

Premiere
- Date premiered: 21 January 1918
- Place premiered: Coliseum Theatre

Annajanska, the Bolshevik Empress: A Revolutionary Romancelet is a one-act play by George Bernard Shaw, written in 1917.

The play is obviously influenced by the Russian Revolution that year. It takes place in an imaginary country which has recently experienced a similar revolution. The two main characters are the daughter of the ruler, who once ran away to join the circus as a girl, and now supports the revolution, and an army officer who opposes it.

== Characters ==
- Annajanska
- General Strammfest
- Schneiderkind
- First Soldier

== Plot ==
General Strammfest, whose family has served the Panjandrums of Beotia for 700 years is unhappy about working for the new, very unstable, revolutionary government. He can't make up his mind whether to send his reports to the provisional government or one of the competing namely "Maximillianists" or the "Oppidoshavians". He hopes to restore the old regime. He soon learns that Grand Duchess Annajanska, the beautiful daughter of the Panjandrum, has escaped from the palace to which the royal family have been confined. Reports state that she has eloped with an officer. There is a mystery about the identity and plans of this officer.

News arrives that the Duchess has been captured, but not her lover. Annajanska enters, adopting the haughty air of a princess. The general questions her about the elopement, but she denies it ever happened. The General is concerned that her lover intends to start his own faction, but wonders what it might stand for. Annajanska asks to speak to him in private, but he refuses. She contemptuously ignores him, produces a revolver, and forces everyone else to leave at gunpoint. She tells the General to abandon his counter-revolutionary dreams. She wants no more Panjandrums. Attachment to the old regime is just keeping the people in thralldom. He should work for their liberation. Strammfest argues that revolutions typically create more oppression, not less. The Duchess says that the people will have to be forced to be free. New leaders will arise who will push things forward. She wants a new energy to be unleashed, saying "I am for anything that will make the world less like a prison and more like a circus." She would happily appear on stage as the "Bolshevik Empress". Finally, the mystery of the officer she eloped with is resolved as she opens her cloak to reveal a military uniform underneath. She is the mystery officer herself.

== Productions ==
It was first produced on 21 January 1918 at the Coliseum Theatre. It was originally described as a translation of the work of an imaginary Russian writer called Gregory Biessipoff: "Annajanska, the Wild Duchess, play in one act from the Russian of Gregory Biessipoff". The lead role was played by Lillah McCarthy. The "wonderful white uniform" she theatrically unveils at the end of the play was designed by Charles Ricketts.

== Interpretations ==
J.W. Hulse argues that Shaw's work always implies a tension between the writer's reformist and anarchist tendencies. His Fabianism was disturbed by Bolshevik radicalism, while his anarchic side looked forward to the wildness of revolution. Gareth Griffith says that though Shaw portrays both pro and anti-revolutionary views, the play is clearly pro-revolution. He argues that "Shaw's letters from the period do not suggest he feared a Bolshevik victory and, though the play does affirm the challenge of revolution, that affirmation was far from straightforward."

The play is set in "Boetia", a term for a province of ancient Greece proverbial for the stupidity of its inhabitants, a meaning that was common in English at the time the play was written.
