= Passion, Poison, and Petrifaction =

Play by George Bernard Shaw

Notice for the first production, 1905

Passion, Poison, and Petrifaction, subtitled The Fatal Gazogene: a Brief Tragedy for Barns and Booths is a short play by Bernard Shaw. It is a comic mock-melodrama, written to raise funds for charity. It has been revived occasionally, in tandem with other short works by Shaw or by other playwrights.

== Background ==
Shaw began writing the play in May 1905 and finished it on 4 June. It was published in Harry Furniss's Christmas Annual 1905, and was privately printed for copyright purposes in the US in the same year. It first appeared in book form in Translations and Tomfooleries, 1926.

Shaw wrote of the piece, "This tragedy was written at the request of Mr Cyril Maude, under whose direction it was performed repeatedly, with colossal success, in a booth in Regent's Park, for the benefit of The Actors' Orphanage, on the 14th July 1905". Brandon Thomas and Lionel Brough stationed themselves outside the tent drumming up custom for the show.

== Cast ==
The original performers, from left to right: Vanbrugh, Price, Lewis, Maude, Pawle, Williams and Huntley

- Lady Magnesia FitzTollemache – Irene Vanbrugh
- Phyllis, her maid – Nancy Price
- George FitzTollemache – Eric Lewis
- Adolphus Bastaple – Cyril Maude
- The Landlord – Lennox Pawle
- Police Constable – Arthur Williams
- Doctor – G. P. Huntley
- Choir of Invisible Angels – Messrs Mason, Tucker, Maney, Humphreys

== Plot ==
Period: "Not for an age but for all time". Scene: A bed sitting-room in a fashionable quarter of London.

Late at night, Phyllis, the maid, is combing the hair of her employer, Lady Magnesia FitzTollemache. Phyllis expresses foreboding and the fear that she will never see her beloved mistress again. Magnesia retires to sleep, serenaded by a heavenly choir singing "Won't You Come Home Bill Bailey". A murderous figure enters, brandishing a dagger. Before he can stab Magnesia she wakes, and recognises her husband. Her admirer, Adolphus, demands admittance so that he can show her his new suit of evening clothes made of bright yellow and black cloth with a silver-spangled waistcoat and red kerchief.

Fitz offers Adolphus a whisky and soda. The gazogene (soda-siphon) contains poison and Adolphus is soon writhing on the floor. Magnesia declares that with Adolphus dead she will have to devote all her energies to doting on her husband. Finding this prospect overwhelming, Fitz reveals that there is an antidote to the poison, namely lime, which they can get from the plaster of the ceiling. They throw boots up to bring pieces of the ceiling down. Adolphus cannot force the plaster down this throat, and instead Magnesia reaches for a plaster bust of herself, which she bids Phyllis dissolve in hot water. Adolphus drinks the mixture, and with the poison neutralised he sinks into a deep sleep.

The FitzTollemaches' landlord appears, complaining at the noise from the room. He believes that the recumbent Adolphus is dead, accuses the others of murdering him, and summons the police. The constable cannot rouse Adolphus, and discovers that the plaster has set inside him, turning him into a living statue. A doctor arrives as a violent storm breaks. Lightning fatally strikes the doctor, the policeman and the landlord. The FitzTollemaches raise the statue upright and kneel before it, as the heavenly choir again sings "Bill Bailey". The statue raises its hands in benediction, the band plays the national anthem and attendants pass through the auditorium ejecting the audience.

== Later productions ==
The BBC broadcast a radio version of the play in 1926, and the early BBC television service transmitted another in 1939. The play was staged in London in 1945, and again as part of a Shaw Festival at the Arts Theatre in 1951. This was the last production in London during Shaw's lifetime. Later productions included one at the Mermaid Theatre in 1967, of which the reviewer in The Times observed that Shaw's plot and punning anticipated Spike Milligan at his most surrealist. The piece was revived again at the Arts the following year in a triple bill with short comedies by Michel de Ghelderode and Chekhov.

== Opera adaptations ==
The play was adapted in 1975 for a comic opera, Lady Magnesia, by the Polish-Russian composer Mieczysław Weinberg (his Opus 112). It was also made into operas by Bruce Taub (1976) and Philip Hagemann (1988).
