= The Simpleton of the Unexpected Isles =

1934 play by George Bernard Shaw

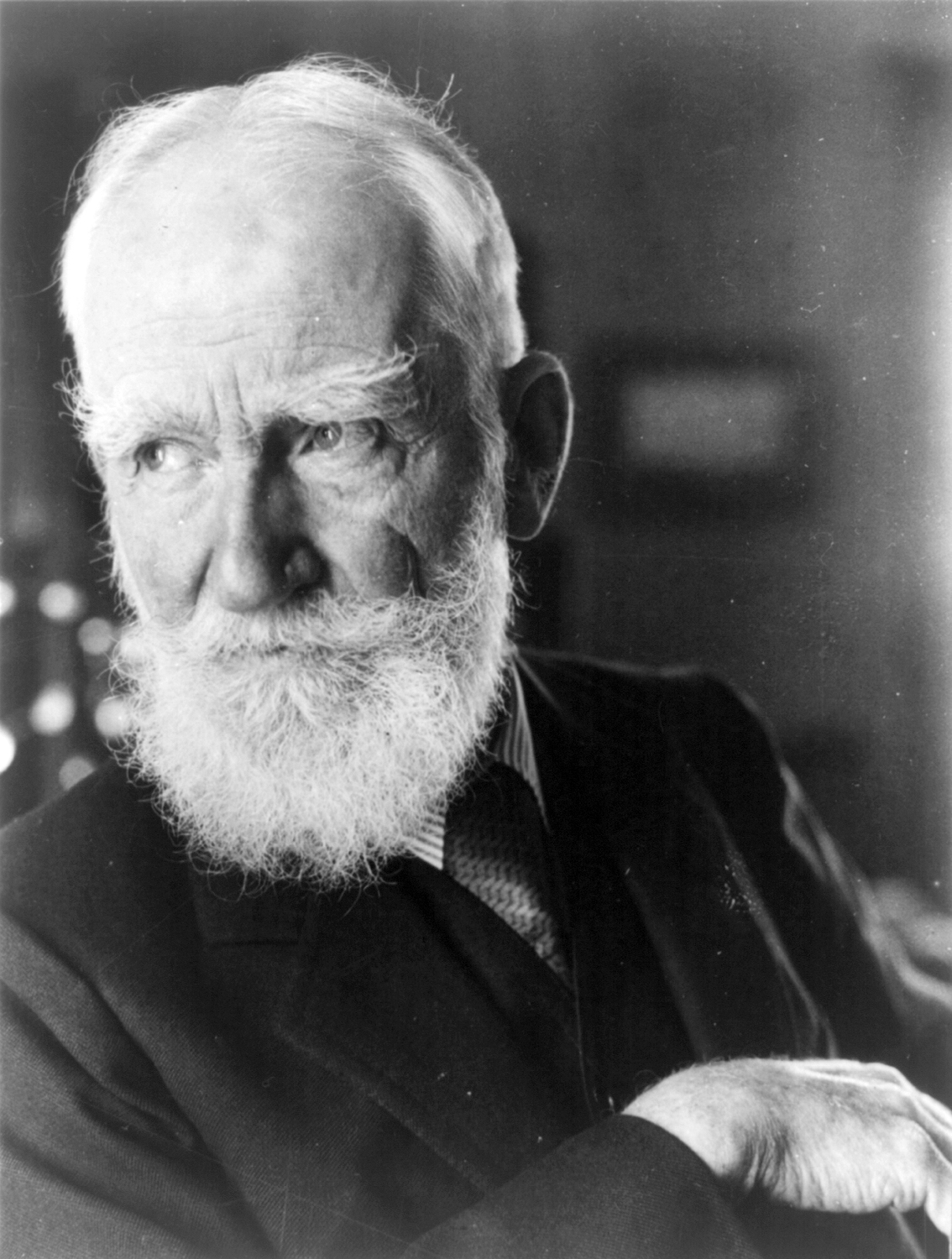
- Original language: English
- Written by: George Bernard Shaw
- Subject: Inhabitants of a newly formed island experiment with polygamy.
- Genre: allegory; comedy
- Setting: a Polynesian island

Premiere
- Date: February 18, 1935
- Place: Guild Theatre, Theatre Guild of New York

The Simpleton of the Unexpected Isles: A Vision of Judgement is a 1934 play by George Bernard Shaw. The play is a satirical allegory about an attempt to create a utopian society on a Polynesian island that has recently emerged from the sea.

The play divided critics. Edmund Wilson described it as Shaw's only "silly play", in which the action seems to be purely whimsical. In contrast, Frederick McDowell wrote that Shaw had created "a symbolic fable" to expound his own "deeply felt ideas". The preface, in which Shaw appears to advocate the killing of useless individuals in a future society, has been considered to be distasteful by several commentators.

== Creation ==
Shaw wrote the play in 1934, originally entitling it "the End of the Simpleton". Shaw added a note to his secretary suggesting that "the final title...will probably be The Unexpected Isles or something like that." It was first produced by the Theatre Guild of New York at the Guild Theatre on February 18, 1935, directed by Romney Brent. A production in England followed at the Malvern Festival, July 29, 1935.

== Plot ==
East Asian princess Prola and a priest Pra, decide to join with two European couples in a sexually communal "superfamily" to create a utopian community on an uninhabited island that has just emerged from the sea in an obscure outpost of the British Empire. They produce two mixed-race children, Maya and Vashti, who are intended to blend the qualities of the East and the West. The children have ideal refined sensibilities, but lack common sense.

Issie, a British clergyman, arrives on the island, dropped off by pirates. He is drawn into its idiosyncratic mores, eventually enthusiastically embracing the polygamous lifestyle by mating with Maya and Vashti and producing two children. This causes scandal in Britain, leading to a proposed invasion of the island to impose conventional morality. However, English politicians decide that the best course is for England to declare its own independence from the British Empire. At this point the Angel of the Lord appears, declares that the Last Judgement has come, and makes most of the characters disappear because they are useless. News arrives from Britain that large numbers of British politicians have also disappeared, along with most doctors.

Prola and Pra are left alone. Prola says they will begin anew to embrace the future and the force of life itself, since now the whole world is an "unexpected isle".

== Preface ==
The play was published along with The Six of Calais and The Millionairess in 1936. The trio was later given the overall title "Plays Extravagant". The published version included a preface in which Shaw appeared to advocate the efficient mass killing of "useless" persons. Shaw speaks about the creation of the Cheka in the Soviet Union, which he asserts was necessary to deal with counter-revolutionaries and eliminate "lazy" individuals. He says that distaste for the suffering involved in punishments can be overcome by devising efficient and painless deaths for people who are of no use to the community:

we need a greatly increased intolerance of socially injurious conduct and an uncompromising abandonment of punishment and its cruelties, together with a sufficient school inculcation of social responsibility to make every citizen conscious that if his life costs more than it is worth to the community the community may painlessly extinguish it....Any intelligent and experienced administrator of the criminal law will tell you that there are people who come up for punishment again and again for the same offence, and that punishing them is a cruel waste of time. There should be an Inquisition always available to consider whether these human nuisances should not be put out of their pain, or out of their joy as the case may be.

Shaw says he introduced the fantasy of a Day of Judgement as a dramatic way of reimagining the logic of what has been happening in "the great Russian change, or any of the actual political changes which threaten to raise it in the National-Socialist and Fascist countries, and to go back to the old vision of a day of reckoning by divine justice for all mankind."

== Reception ==
Critics at both the New York and London premieres generally expressed "confusion and disconcertment" at the work. Shaw was not pleased. In a booklet for the Malvern production, he wrote:

Plays of my own, popular enough now, were forbidden by the censorship for many years; and even to-day, when I am 79, the New York critics can see nothing in my latest play but the antics of a monkey. But they will get used to it in time; and when they shriek out their dislike of my next play, they will deplore it as an ignominious fall from the heights on which I produced that masterpiece, The Simpleton. All my plays are masterpieces except the last one.

Shaw explained the play as a satire on spiritual utopianism. According to Bernard F. Dukore, in the Shavian fantasy of judgement "angels proclaim the world to belong to those who think, plan, and work for its betterment."

Erich Strauss considered the play to be evidence of Shaw's decline. He objected to "the use of allegorical figures. They are 'the four lovely phantasms who embody all the artistic, romantic and military ideals of our cultured suburbs,' to wit, 'Love, Pride, Heroism and Empire." Other critics have had a more favourable view. Daniel J. Leary saw the play as an anticipation of the theatre of the absurd, and as an allegory about the embrace of nothingness. Rodelle Weintraub sees it as a Freudian "dream play".

=== Alleged politics ===
The politics allegedly implied by the play have come in for severe criticism, though this may be influenced as much by the preface than the play itself. In 1936, the reviewer of the published version in the Times Literary Supplement wrote that, "In all the play and preface nothing has been said but that at the price of bloody tyranny we might achieve a set of social values different from those now held." Homer E. Woodbridge was repelled by the idea that "useless" people should be identified and eliminated:

The old love of strangeness, which underlies all his work and which Pater regarded as the essence of the romantic spirit, is there in the bizarre setting, the odd and fantastic persons; but the power to make these grotesqueries even momentarily real to us, the power of creative imagination, is gone. The will to preach and prophesy is there; but the prophetic message is that we should set up an Ogpu [secret police]. The love of farce is there, appearing in incident and dialogue, especially in the scenes in which the Simpleton figures; but the farce squeaks and gibbers like the ghost of Shaw's earlier comedy."

Shaw's biographer Michael Holroyd notes that when the play was revived in the 1990s many critics expressed distaste, with Charles Spencer in The Daily Telegraph claiming to be "nauseated" after reading the preface. Benedict Nightingale in The Times said that it communicated "intellectual poison and death" and Michael Coveney in The Observer stated "No wonder the play went down well in Nazi Germany". Holroyd says that though the play was performed in Germany at the time, it was not a major success.
