= The Six of Calais =

Play by George Bernard Shaw

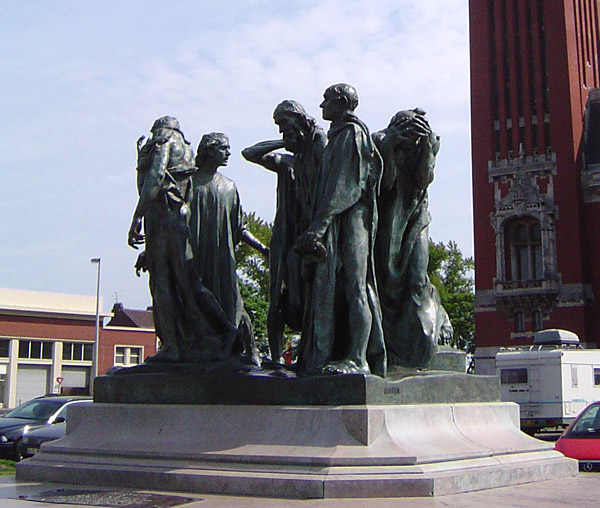
- Rodin's The Burghers of Calais, which inspired the play
- Original language: English
- Written by: George Bernard Shaw
- Subject: Edward III plans to hang the Burghers of Calais
- Genre: history play comedy
- Setting: Medieval Calais

Premiere
- Date: 1934
- Place: Open Air theatre

The Six of Calais is a one-act play by George Bernard Shaw. It was inspired by Auguste Rodin's sculpture The Burghers of Calais. It is a historical comedy about the conflict between Edward III of England and his wife Philippa of Hainault over his plans to punish the leading citizens of Calais for resisting the 1346 siege. The play was first produced in 1934 at the Open Air theatre.

== Conception ==
Shaw had had a long friendship with the sculptor Auguste Rodin, who had made a portrait bust of the playwright, and had long admired his sculpture of The Burghers of Calais. Rodin himself had once said of Shaw that his obsession with "cold" reason was "modified to vapour by his temperamental shyness and his Irish sense of humor". The struggle between anger, reason and humour is one of the themes of the play.

== Plot ==
King Edward III of England intends to hang six leading citizens of Calais for resisting his siege of the town, but he must keep his plans from his wife Philippa, whose forgiving nature is such that she will plead for their lives. Peter Hardmouth, the leading burgher is unrepentant, and berates Edward for his warmongering. Philippa finds out about Edward's plan and uses all her wiles to persuade him to change his mind, clinching her case by saying that the brutality could adversely affect their unborn child. He eventually gives in, but decides he will use Hardmouth to get back at her. He brings in Hardmouth, who proceeds to berate the queen mercilessly. Furious, she insists that Hardmouth be punished, but now the king says she must be as forgiving as he was. The king warms to Hardmouth when he learns that he comes from Champagne, like the king's grandmother. The two bond and start playing a game which involves pretending to be dogs. The queen is not amused. She is further outraged when Edward says that he hopes some of Hardmouth's spirit will enter their unborn child. He kisses her and everyone laughs.

== Preface ==
The play was published along with The Simpleton of the Unexpected Isles and The Millionairess in 1936. In the preface Shaw justified the apparently lightweight character of the piece, by arguing that the purpose of a play is to create elegant order from chaotic experience.

== Production and reception ==
The play was produced at the Open Air theatre in 1934.

John Anthony Bertolini describes the play as a self-referential work in which the characters all performing roles. He considers it the most "fully realized" example of Shaw's conception of comic form.
