= Why She Would Not =

Play written by George Bernard Shaw

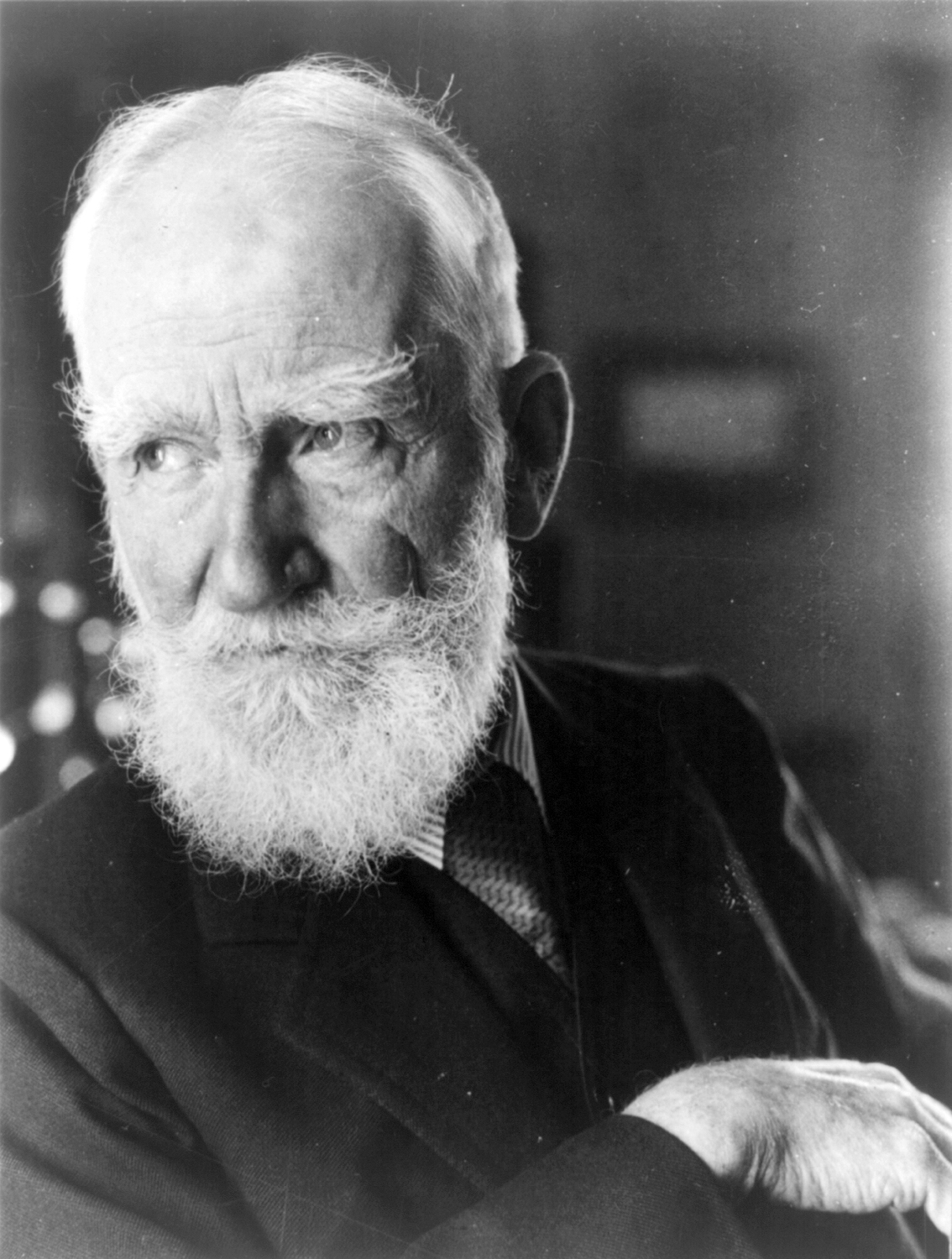
- Original language: English
- Written by: George Bernard Shaw
- Subject: A woman's life is modernised against her inclination
- Genre: comedy

Why She Would Not: A Little Comedy (1950) is the last play written by George Bernard Shaw, comprising five short scenes. The play may or may not have been completed at his death. It was published six years later.

== Origin ==
Shaw's neighbour and illustrator Clare Winsten said that Shaw had described his initial idea for the plot to her, saying: "I am writing a play in which there is an old man who has a housekeeper who is so houseproud that she gradually eliminates everything that is personal in the house until he feels a perfect stranger there." He also discussed the play with Nancy Astor, whose friend Judy Musters typed up Shaw's manuscript. According to Michael Holroyd he wrote it in one week in July 1950, shortly before his 94th birthday. He died four months later.

In the final version, the genders of the characters are reversed, with a male figure appearing in the "housekeeper" role.

== Plot ==
A tramp called Henry Bossborn rescues a young woman from a robber in the woods. He learns that she is Serafina White, the granddaughter of an elderly businessman who runs the largest timber merchants in the country. As a reward, he asks for a job in the business — but on his own terms. She agrees. Soon he has transformed the business and increased its profits. He has also started his own property-development company. He knocks down the old mansion in which Miss White grew up and replaces it with a new super-efficient modernistic home. He expects to marry her and move into the new house. She is unhappy with the changes and refuses to marry him. He explains that he is serving the "life force" which demands renewal, but she is unwilling to fully accept this, and agrees only to friendship, not marriage.

== Publication and completions ==
The play was published in The London Magazine in August 1956. Because the play ends abruptly, it has been argued that Shaw intended to add one more scene. However after the publication Dan H. Laurence examined the surviving manuscripts. In his essay "The Facts about Why She Would Not" (1956), he argued that the play was completed, noting that the shorthand version of the manuscript ends with the words "End of Scene 5 and of the play". Holroyd says it was written quickly, and that the figure of Bossborn, who moves from a tramp to a form of superman, is a version of Shaw himself, including his inability to overcome his personal isolation. In 2009 David Staller, founder of the Gingold Theatrical Group commissioned five different final scenes from five writers: Israel Horovitz, Michael Feingold, David Cote, Jeremy McCarter and Robert Simonson.
