= Macbeth Skit =

1916 short comic skit by George Bernard Shaw

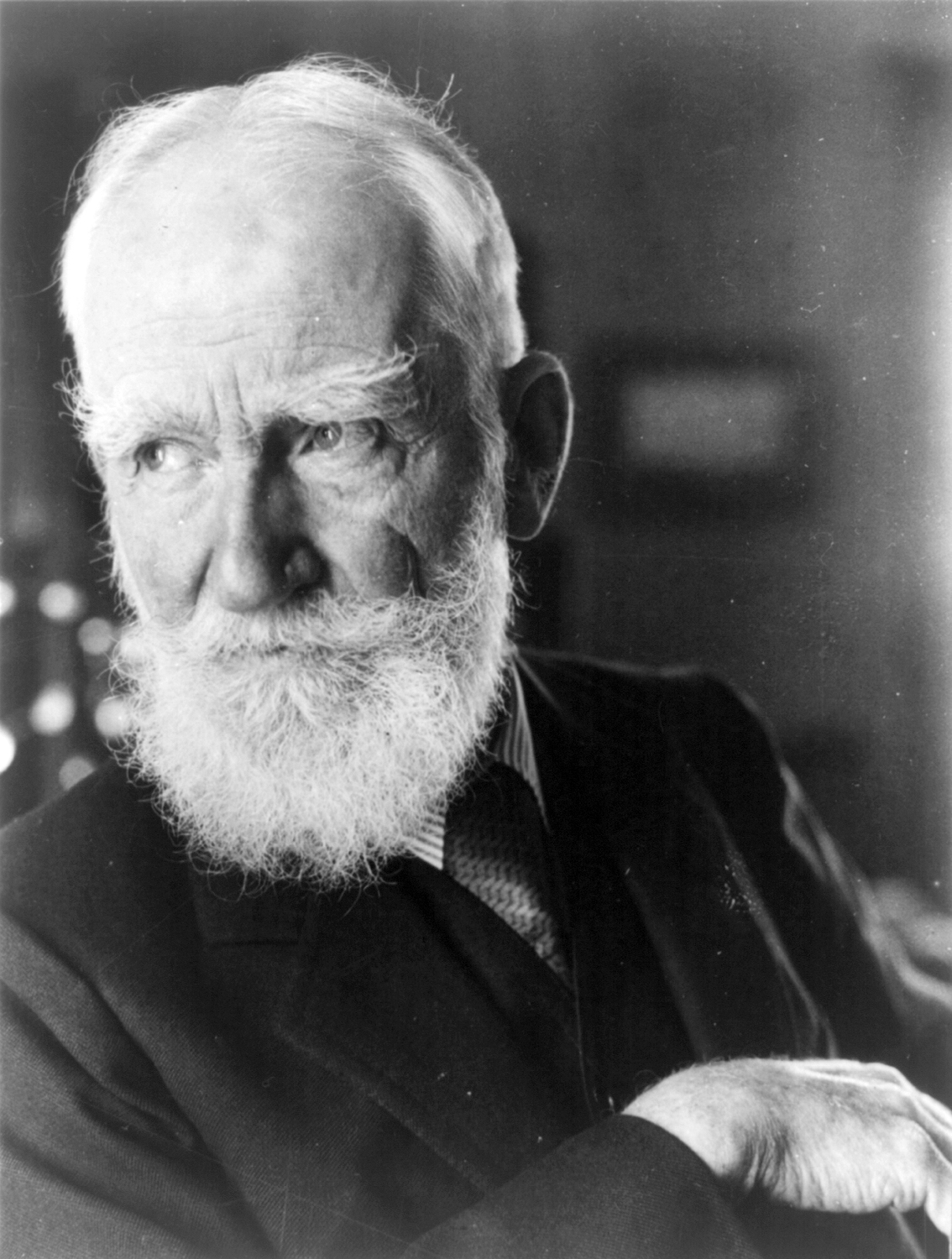
- Written by: George Bernard Shaw
- Original language: English
- Subject: Macbeth is perplexed by his wife's poetic language
- Genre: satire

Premiere
- Date premiered: unperformed

Macbeth Skit (1916) is a short comic skit by George Bernard Shaw on William Shakespeare's portrayal of Macbeth's relationship with Lady Macbeth.

== Origin ==
According to the manuscript, it was written in 1916 for performance by Lillah McCarthy and Gerald du Maurier, actors who had recently appeared in productions of Macbeth. There were many Shakespeare tributes in that year, as 1916 was the 300th anniversary of Shakespeare's death. McCarthy and du Maurier were both appearing in a production called A Tribute to the Genius of William Shakespeare.

However, Shaw's work remained unpublished and unperformed during his lifetime. In a note written by Shaw in the manuscript, he says du Maurier refused to put on the skit. Shaw wrote, "Gerald would not burlesque himself. Probably he considered himself an ideal Macbeth."

It was published in 1960, edited by Shaw scholar Bernard Dukore. The manuscript is untitled. The name "Macbeth Skit" was used for the 1960 publication.

The skit takes lines from Act 1 scenes 5 and 7 of Shakespeare's Macbeth. Lady Macbeth typically retains Shakespeare's lines, while Macbeth speaks in modern colloquial English, often expressing confusion about what she is saying. In Shaw's version, Macbeth is transformed into a "maundering nincompoop".

== Plot ==
Lady Macbeth soliloquises about her husband's letter describing his encounter with the witches. Macbeth arrives and says he's very impressed by his wife's poetic way of speaking. Lady Macbeth says that he should kill Duncan, emphasising that he should appear to be wholly innocent in public. But Macbeth takes literally her Shakespearean imagery – such as trying to resemble a flower after his wife tells him he should "look like the innocent flower" when Duncan arrives. He's also perplexed by the reference to "the poor cat in the adage", having no clue what cat appears in what adage, and is totally defeated by the suggestion that the "receipt of reason shall be a limbec only". Eventually he works out what her plan is and agrees, but as soon as he misunderstands her line about his "terrible feat" as a derogatory comment on his feet, Lillah McCarthy as Lady Macbeth steps out of character in despair and says "Gerald: come off it. I shall never make a Shakespearan actor of you."
