= Passion Play: a dramatic fragment =

Passion Play
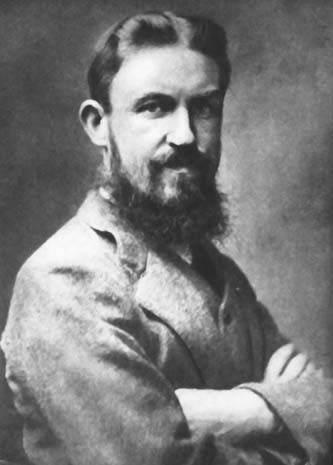
- Written by: George Bernard Shaw
- Original language: English
- Subject: Life of Jesus

Premiere
- Date premiered: unproduced

Passion Play: A Dramatic Fragment is an early and incomplete play in blank verse by George Bernard Shaw. It was written in 1878, shortly after his arrival in London at the age of 21. The play seems to be conceived as a skeptical retelling of the Gospel story in two acts.

== Plot ==
The first act is set in Nazareth, where Jesus is a young man in his twenties, unhappy at his recent rejection by a local beauty named Rahab. Joseph is portrayed as a drunkard and a poor workman, and his relationship with Mary as difficult and often violent. A wealthy passing traveller called Judas arrives in search of a cabinet-maker's services; he and Jesus form a friendship, and set off together for Jerusalem at Judas' prompting.

The second act is set in Jerusalem some years later, after some marvels attributed to Jesus have happened. Judas and Jesus are still close friends, Barabbas appears as a thief preying on traders in the Temple, Mary Magdalene is Pilate's mistress and Saul one of his officers, and there is a dispute between Peter and John over who best observes their master's doctrines, but the manuscript breaks off before a resolution of these elements.

== Constraints on performance ==
The play was not performable in London at the time it was written because of censorship restrictions then in place on the portrayal of Christ, but Shaw may have had hopes of getting it put on in Dublin where such constraints did not exist.

== Publication ==
The play was first published nearly a century after its writing by the Windhover Press, University of Iowa in 1971. It was later republished in 1974 in volume 7 of Complete Plays with their prefaces.
