= Anglo-Swedish Literary Foundation =

Cultural fund

The Anglo-Swedish Literary Foundation is a fund for the development of cultural relations between the UK and Sweden. The fund was founded in 1927 by George Bernard Shaw with his Nobel Prize in Literature in 1925 as a basis. Administered by Swedish officials, its main expenditure is literary translation from Swedish into English.
