= Un Petit Drame =

1884 play by George Bernard Shaw

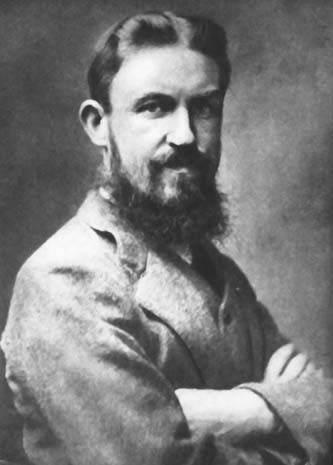
- Original language: French
- Written by: George Bernard Shaw

Premiere
- Date: unproduced

Un Petit Drame (1884) is a short play by George Bernard Shaw. It was Shaw's first completed dramatic work, and the only one he wrote in French.

== Background ==
The play was created because Shaw was practicing French with his friend Ida Beatty. Michael Holroyd said that "Un Petit Drame satirizes his uncle Walter Gurly's household, carries a number of jokes about his family and friends, and demonstrates his talent for rearranging autobiographical fragments so that they become absurdly foreign (literally so here) to himself." Walter Gurly was a ship's surgeon who was a colourful drunkard and, according to Shaw, "always in high spirits and full of humour that was barbarous in its blasphemous indecency".

== Publication ==
The play was unpublished during Shaw's lifetime. It was first published in 1959 in Esquire, marketed as "Bernard Shaw's First and Hitherto Unpublished Play". The French text was accompanied by an English translation by Norman Denny and an introduction by Stanley Weintraub.
