= The Millionairess (play) =

Play written by George Bernard Shaw

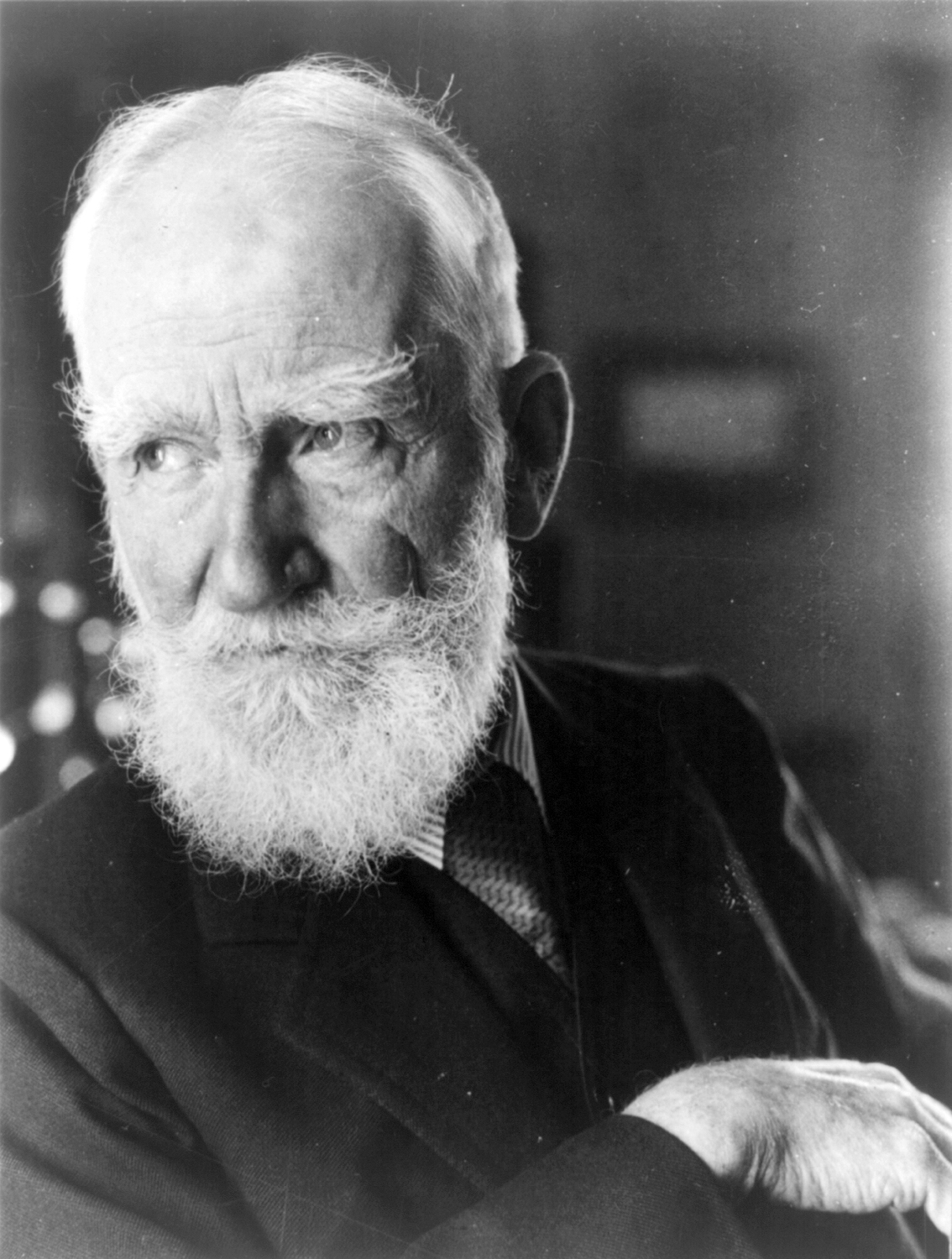
- Original language: English
- Written by: George Bernard Shaw
- Genre: Comedy

Premiere
- Date: 4 January 1936
- Place: Burgtheater, Vienna

The Millionairess is a play written in 1936 by George Bernard Shaw. It tells the story of Epifania, a spoilt heiress, and her search for a suitor.

Shaw wrote the play in 1936 expressly for Edith Evans. Evans rejected the role, calling it "too icy". However, she did act the part in 1940, in a pre-London production tour in the provinces.

== Plot ==
=== Act One ===
Epifania Ognisanti di Parerga, the richest woman in England (and possibly Europe), barges into the offices of solicitor Julius Sagamore wanting him to draw out a will leaving everything to her husband Alistair Fitzfassenden (an amateur tennis and boxing champion), and states that after the will is signed, she intends to kill herself. Sagamore manages to get her to calm down, and she explains her circumstances: before her father died and left her thirty million pounds, he had made her promise that if any man wanted to marry her, she was to give him one hundred fifty pounds and six months to turn it into fifty thousand; if the man failed, she was never to see him again. Alistair succeeded (by co-producing a hit play), but the marriage has since imploded to the point where Alistair is having a relationship with Patricia Smith (nicknamed "Polly Seedy-Stockings") and Epifania is spending time with Adrian Blenderbland (a self-styled intellectual and inveterate gourmand). Alistair and Polly arrive at Sagamore's office while Epifania is there wanting to discuss a possible separation between Alistair and Epifania, and Blenderbland also turns up also wanting to consult Sagamore. After a confusing consultation in which nothing gets resolved, Epifania leaves with Blenderbland to have lunch somewhere in the country and Alistair and Polly leave together (with Polly telling Sagamore that she fully intends to have Alistair for her own).

=== Act Two ===
Epifania and Blenderbland are at a rather run-down riverside establishment having just finished lunch. Epifania is cheerful, but Blenderbland is totally "out of temper" because of the horrible meal he has just had to endure. His bad mood leads to harsh words between the two, and when Blenderbland makes disparaging remarks about Epifania's late father (whom she still worships), she uses her knowledge of and skill at judo to throw him not only all over the room but down the stairs, after which she collapses in hysterics. She is found in that condition by an Egyptian doctor, who, seeing that her fit has subsided, rushes to Blenderbland's aid instead of staying with her (much to her astonishment) and later returns to inform her that the landlord is taking Blenderbland to the local hospital in her car. She becomes fascinated by the doctor and insists that he become her doctor, which he refuses. Her feminine wiles also have no effect on him, since "Women are neither interesting nor attractive to me except when they are ill. I know too much about them, inside and out," and he is completely dedicated to his work; however, as a case she does interest him. As they talk, Epifania becomes extremely interested in the doctor and tells him point-blank that she wants to marry him, She starts to tell him about her father's test, but he interrupts her to inform her that his late mother had made him promise to impose a similar test on any woman who wanted to marry him: he is supposed to give the woman two hundred piastres (approximately thirty shillings or one and a half pounds) and she is to make her living for six months with only that money and the clothes she is currently wearing. Epifania accepts the challenge (even though he has to borrow the two hundred piastres from her) and arranges for him to get the one hundred fifty pounds. She departs, leaving the doctor to wonder if she's not one of Allah's jokes on humanity (and on himself in particular).

=== Act Three ===
Epifania tries to get work at a sweatshop somewhere in London, but the owner and his wife are scared that she’s really a labor Inspector and try to bribe her off. In the course of their conversation, Epifania learns not only about the workings of the sweatshop but also the conditions most female workers have to exist under. She begins to suggest certain ideas to cut out the middlemen that the owner and his wife have to deal with and how the operation can be upgraded to make it more profitable for everyone. Epifania leaves (not finding much of a challenge for her here) to get a job elsewhere, but promising to return every so often to keep things running smoothly (in effect, taking control over the business from the owner and his wife); her intelligence and force of will are so powerful that the owner and his wife have no choice but to comply.

=== Act Four ===
Alistair and Polly are enjoying a quiet weekend at the riverside inn from Act Two which has been rebuilt and remodeled into a first-class hotel. The manager tells them the story about how a newly hired scullery-maid got control of the old inn, upgraded everything and eventually took over, forcing the old owners (his parents) out but giving him a well-paying job and making the business a major success. Alistair is horrified to discover that Epifania is the scullery-maid of the story and is about to beat a hasty retreat with Polly when Sagamore arrives with Blenderbland, who is still recovering from the injuries inflicted upon him by Epifania in Act Two. Blenderbland intends suing Epifania for damages and hospital costs, which Sagamore hopes Alistair and Polly can talk him out of. Epifania arrives and upon learning of Blenderbland's plan orders Sagamore to begin countersuit proceedings against Blenderbland, insisting that she will not submit to blackmail. Sagamore finally makes Blenderbland see that suing Epifania would be a waste of time; not only will her financial means outlast his, but a jury (presumably all-male) would have no sympathy with a man who had been thrashed by a woman. With that matter out of the way, Epifania finally decides to divorce Alistair on the grounds of spousal abuse (he had accidentally knocked her out with a solar plexus punch during a fight on their honeymoon) and announces her intention to find a man truly worthy of her. At that moment, the Egyptian doctor enters, having been summoned to attend Blenderbland, and Epifania announces her intention to marry him, having easily fulfilled the conditions of his mother’s test. However, the doctor has NOT fulfilled the terms of her father’s test; he has used the money to help the widow of his old medical teacher. It turns out that the teacher had invented a new type of filament but never filed for a patent on it, and the doctor had forced the company using the filament to compensate the inventor’s widow, thereby (in retrospect) investing in the discovery and making more than the required fifty thousand pounds. Blenderbland warns the doctor that in marrying Epifania he will be headed for trouble, but Epifania counters with, “What do the unmarried know of this infinitely dangerous heart tearing ever-changing life of adventure that we call marriage? Face it as you would face a dangerous operation: have you not performed hundreds of them?” The fact that the doctor has fallen in love with Epifania’s pulse (the strongest and steadiest he has ever encountered) settles the matter, and Epifania instructs Sagamore to arrange both her divorce and the marriage proceedings.

== Performances ==
The Millionairess received its world premiere in Siegfried Trebitsch's German translation as Die Millionärin on January 4, 1936 at the Vienna Akademie Theatre with Maria Eis as Epifania.

The first production in English took place at the King's Theatre, Melbourne, Australia on 7 March 1936 in a production by Gregan McMahon. Shaw granted McMahon permission to stage the play ahead of any English theatre in gratitude for McMahon's championing his plays in Australia over the previous 25 years.

The first production of The Millionairess in Great Britain was presented in November 1936 by the Forsyth Players, a local repertory company in Bexhill-on-Sea.

The Millionairess opened at the Malvern Open Air Drama Festival in Malvern, Worcestershire in 1937 with Sybil Thorndike as Epifania. The reception was lukewarm, and the play did not go to London.

The Millionairess toured round the UK in the summer of 1940 prior to a planned season in London which was cancelled due to the Blitz. It starred Edith Evans as Epifania, Frank Cellier (actor) as Blenderbland, Alan Webb (actor) as the Egyptian Doctor and Ronald Squire as Sagamor. Alistair, the athlete husband of Epifania was played with infectious joy by Sebastian Shaw (actor).

The U.S. premiere of The Millionairess took place in 1938 at the Westport Country Playhouse in Westport, Connecticut with Jessie Royce Landis in the title role and Onslow Stevens as the Doctor, with Harry Wagstaff Gribble directing.

The first production of The Millionairess on Broadway was presented by the Dramatic Workshop of The New School at the President Theatre with Margrit Wyler, Woodrow Parfrey and Leoa Harlow, and ran for 13 performances from April 6 to April 17, 1949.

In the summer of 1952, Katharine Hepburn starred in The Millionairess for a ten-week run at the New Theatre in London's West End. The production, directed by Michael Benthall and co-starring Robert Helpmann and Cyril Ritchard, was widely praised. In October 1952, it was brought to New York where it played at the Shubert Theatre for ten weeks and 83 performances.

A well-received production was performed by the American Shaw Festival at Mount Gretna, Pennsylvania July - August 1986 with Jane Roth-Casson as Epifania and Sullivan Brown as The Doctor.

The Shaw Festival at Niagara-on-the-Lake, Ontario has performed the play a number of times: in 1965, 1977, 1991 and 2001. Most recently, the play was presented by the Shaw Festival in its Court House Theatre in 2012 and was directed by Blair Williams, with set design by Cameron Porteous, lighting design by Louise Guinard and sound design by Dmitri Marine.

== Film and television ==
A film version of The Millionairess was made in 1960, directed by Anthony Asquith and starring Sophia Loren and Peter Sellers, with substantial alterations made to the text.

The BBC Sunday Night Theatre broadcast a production on 6 September 1959 starring Dawn Addams as Epifania and Donald Pleasence as The Doctor.

The play was taped for the BBC's Play of the Month (1972) series and broadcast on 25 September 1972, starring Maggie Smith as Epifania, Tom Baker as The Doctor and Charles Gray as Adrian Blenderbland.

In 1974, a television play was filmed, directed by Boris Nirenburg and Alexandra Remizova, featuring actors from the Vakhtangov Theatre: Yulia Borisova as Epifania, Yuri Yakovlev as the Egyptian doctor, and Vladimir Etush as Adrian Blenderbland.
