= Michel Tournier: Le Coq de bruyère =

Michel Tournier: Le Coq de bruyère is an academic book by Walter Redfern, published in 1996 by Fairleigh Dickinson University Press in the United States and by Associated University Presses in the United Kingdom.

The book discusses a short story collection by Michel Tournier, The Fetishist, titled in French as Le Coq de bruyère.

Sheila M. Bell of the University of Kent wrote that the book is also an analysis of The Fetishist to explain Tournier's overall methodology and style, and that The Fetishist is a representation of Tournier's body of work.

Each chapter discusses a story, including a summary and analysis. The author did not order the chapter in a particular way since he could not find why the stories were ordered the way they were in the original volume of The Fetishist.

== Reception ==
Bell argued that the book may better serve a "cultivated non-specialist" trying to learn about Tournier while it would frustrate an undergraduate student.

Michael Worton of University College London wrote that he liked how the book "foregrounds" discussion of linguistic play while also addressing the author's sense of humor. Worton stated that he had hoped that Redfern would have clarified whether The Fetishist was a book with an overarching theme or if it was simply a collection of stories.
