= Michel Tournier (Worton book) =

Michel Tournier is a collection of essays edited by Michael Worton, about the French author Michel Tournier, published in 1995 by Longman.

The work has essays newly written for this volume which were created by people who were known for analyzing Tournier's works. Sheila M. Bell of the University of Kent wrote that the book "offers some fine new material, while remaining representative of Tournier criticism thus far."

== Contents ==
Among the essays is one written by Worton about Tournier's life.

Several of the essays cover The Midnight Love Feast, known in French as Le Médianoche amoureux, including one by Mireille Rosello that covers two of the works that are the endmost point of the collection.

== Reception ==
Emma Wilson of Corpus Christi College, Cambridge University, wrote that the work is "exemplary" and that of the analyses of Tournier's works, they are "some of the most provocative and doubting".
