= Terence Wade =

English linguist (1930–2005)

- Born: 19 May 1930; Southend-on-Sea, Essex, England
- Died: 22 November 2005 (aged 75); Glasgow, Scotland
- Spouse: Mary McEwan (m. 1958)
- Children: 2
- Awards: Medal of Pushkin (1996)

Academic background
- Education: Durham University (BA); University of London (BA); University of Strathclyde (PhD)
- Thesis: Meanings of Extent and Purpose in Modern Russian Primary Prepositions (1977)

Academic work
- Discipline: Linguist
- Institutions: University of Strathclyde
- Main interests: Russian

Terence Leslie Brian Wade (19 May 1930 – 22 November 2005) was an English linguist who was Professor of Russian Studies at the University of Strathclyde from 1987 to 1995. After reading German and French at Durham University, he was both a student and instructor in the Joint Services School for Linguists, during which time he studied Russian at Cambridge. He arrived in Glasgow in 1963, and taught and developed courses at Strathclyde, where he received a PhD in 1977. He had a successful stint as chairman of the university's Department of Modern Languages from 1985 to 1993.

In the course of what The Scotsman described as his "55-year love affair with the Russian language", Wade wrote a dozen books about grammar and linguistics, including his Comprehensive Russian Grammar (1992) and Russian Etymological Dictionary (1996). The Times has called his works "classics in their field", and Wade is considered one of Britain's pre-eminent Russianists. He was awarded the Russian government's prestigious Medal of Pushkin in 1996.

== Biography ==
=== Early life ===
Wade was born in 1930 in Southend-on-Sea, Essex – his father Leslie was a cellist, and his mother Jessica a harpist. He was an only child. His mother's family was from Cloughjordan, County Tipperary; her uncle was the Irish revolutionary leader Thomas MacDonagh, and her brother the oboist Terence MacDonagh. Wade has written that "my late mother ... first encouraged me to learn Russian". He lived above a shop selling musical instruments, which his parents ran. After attending Southend High School for Boys, Wade went on to study German with subsidiary French on a scholarship at University College, Durham, graduating with first-class honours in 1953. After graduating, Wade spent a year at King's College London teaching German.

=== Joint Services School for Linguists ===
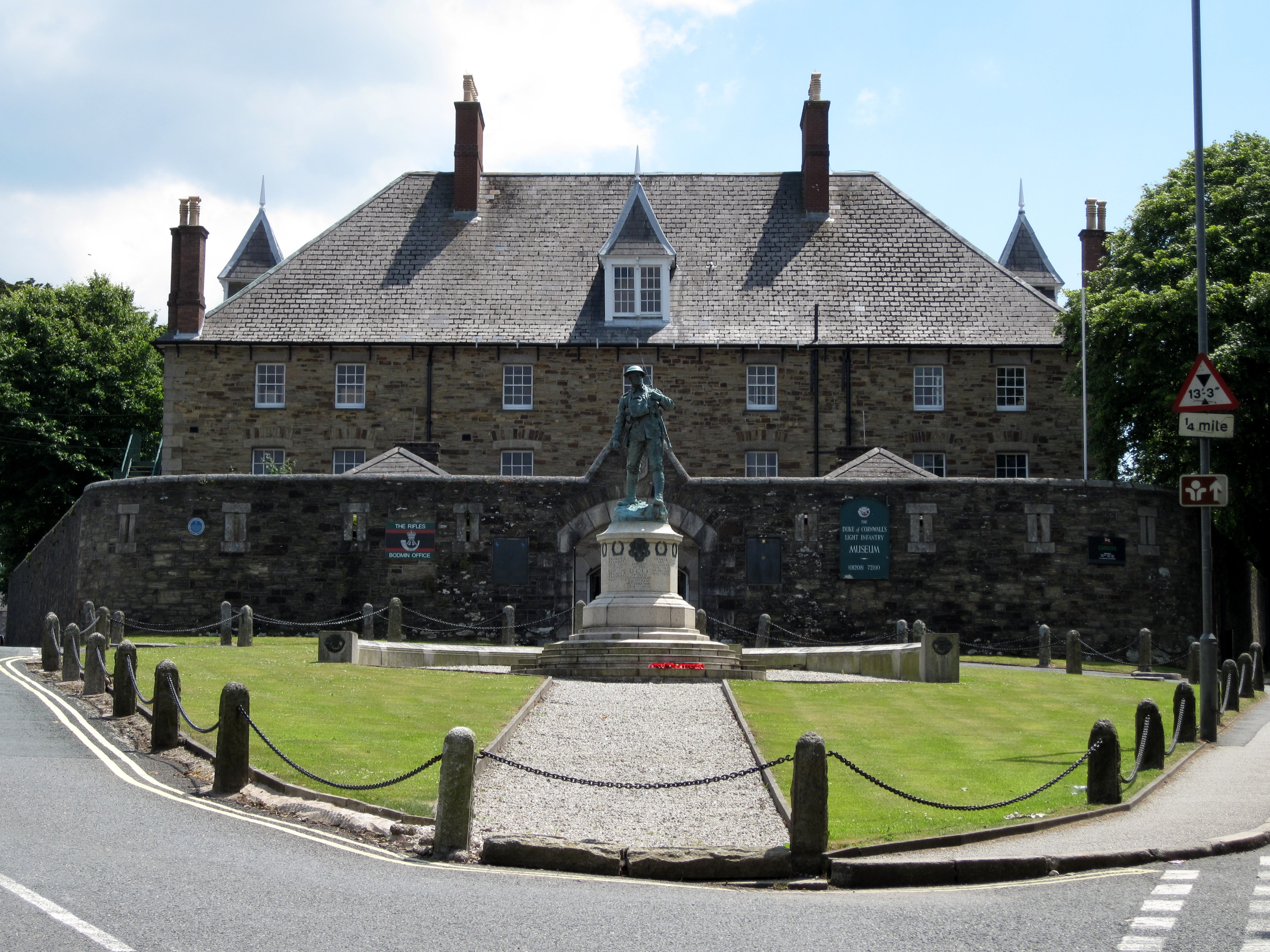
The military base in Bodmin, where Wade studied and taught

Frustrated by his postgraduate research, and at his mother's suggestion, he undertook two years of military service and enrolled in the Joint Services School for Linguists. The JSSL had been established in 1951 to teach the Russian language, as the British government feared a lack of Russian linguists when faced with the threat of Soviet invasion. Its other recruits included Alan Bennett, Michael Frayn and Dennis Potter. Wade was first taught Russian intensively at the University of Cambridge by Professor Elizabeth Hill, and transferred to the Victoria Barracks, Bodmin in Cornwall. After gaining a first-class interpretership, he became an instructor (Russian: грамотей, romanized: gramotei) in Russian and Polish for the JSSL at Bodmin. In 1956, he transferred to Crail Airfield, Fife. His style of teaching has been described as similar to a conventional schoolteacher or university don, when compared to the eccentricity of non-British staff members. Wade met his wife Mary McEwan, then a classics undergraduate at the University of St Andrews, when the two took part in an avant-garde production of Aristophanes' The Clouds – they married in 1958. In 1960, Wade and his wife moved to Beaconsfield, Buckinghamshire, where he joined the Royal Army Educational Corps.

=== University of Strathclyde ===
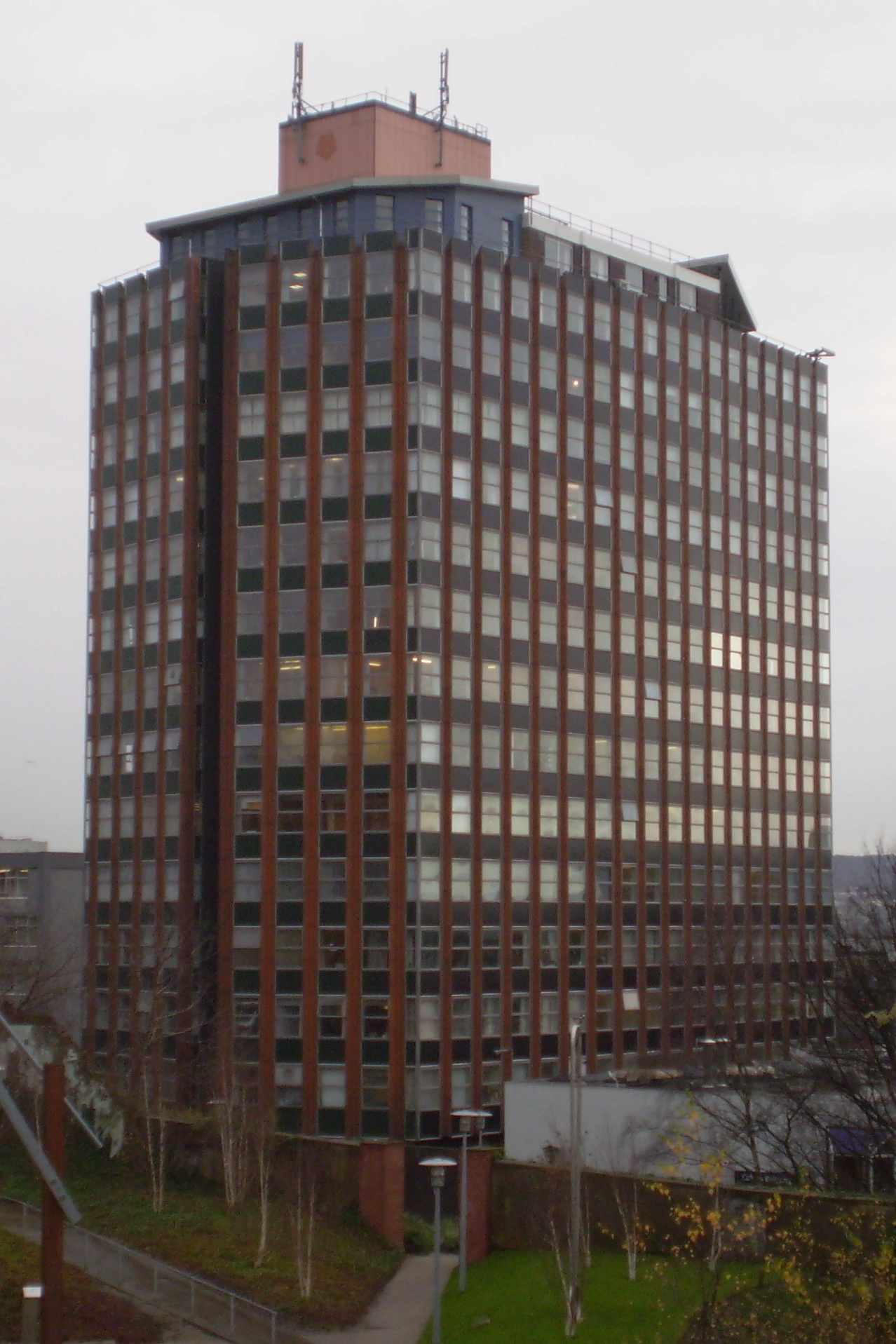
The Livingstone Tower on the John Anderson Campus, former home of the University of Strathclyde's Division of Russian Studies

Three years later, Wade helped to establish the postgraduate diploma in Russian at the Scottish College of Commerce in Glasgow, which became part of the University of Strathclyde the following year – it was an intensive course in Russian intended for teachers of other languages, and later for graduates in fields like politics and economics. Wade taught classes on Russian grammar, literature and political thought, and also helped to design the new university's Bachelor of Arts degree in Russian. In 1968, Wade graduated from the University of London with a first-class degree in Russian with Polish, and in 1977 he received a PhD from Strathclyde: his dissertation was about Russian prepositions. As well as teaching and planning courses, Wade served as a mentor to his colleagues and a counsellor to his students. He was promoted to senior lecturer in 1969, reader in 1981, and professor in 1987.

In 1985, at the behest of his colleagues, he became the chairman of the university's Department of Modern Languages, serving two terms in the role until 1993. In 1988, the University Grants Committee decided that the university's Italian and Spanish sections should be closed as they lacked the resources to provide for their students; Wade successfully campaigned for their survival. He worked to strengthen the university's link with the University of Łódź, and for several years, he and his wife travelled to the isolated village of Konopnica, southwest of Łódź, to teach English to academics without pay. The Scotsman describes his leadership as "quiet [and] unassuming but very effective", and "enormously successful in strengthening the image of the department throughout the university". The Times writes that Wade's knowledge of conflict and other cultures allowed him to "lead the department with sensitivity, and without being corrupted by the power he could command as chairman".

Wade formally retired from his post in 1995, but remained an honorary research fellow. The university began to discontinue its BA in Russian shortly before Wade's death in 2005, and the postgraduate diploma that he developed was transferred to the University of Glasgow in September 2004. In a letter to The Scotsman in June 2004, Wade denounced "the dismantling of innovative Russian departments at Heriot-Watt and Strathclyde universities" and the "virtual disappearance [of Russian] from [school] timetables" in Scotland.

=== Other work ===
Wade set and marked examinations for the Scottish Examination Board, and served as an external examiner for other universities. He was a member of the Russian, Slavonic and East European Languages Panel of the Research Assessment Exercises from 1992 to 1996, and a member and fellow of the Scottish branch of the Institute of Linguists. Wade was the British representative on the presidium of the International Association of Teachers of Russian Language and Literature (Russian: Международная ассоциация преподавателей русского языка и литературы; МАПРЯЛ). He was also chairman and president of the Association of Teachers of Russian, and edited its journal.

== Publications ==
=== Books ===
- Russian Exercises for Language Laboratories (1966, with John Owen Lewis)
- The Russian Preposition Do and the Concept of Extent (1980)
- Prepositions in Modern Russian (1983)
- Russia Today: A Reader (Part 1, Part 2 and Glossary, 1985)
- Gender of Soft-Sign Nouns in Russian (1988)
- A Comprehensive Russian Grammar (1992; 2nd ed. 2000; 3rd ed. 2011, revised by David Gillespie; 4th ed. 2020, revised by David Gillespie, Svetlana Gural and Marina Korneeva)
- A Russian Grammar Workbook (1996; 2nd ed. 2013, revised by David Gillespie)
- Russian Etymological Dictionary (1996)
- The Russian Language Today (1999, with Larissa Ryazanova-Clarke)
- Oxford Russian Grammar & Verbs (2002)
- Using Russian Synonyms (2004, with Nijole White)
- Using Russian Vocabulary (2009) - AATSEEL Language Pedagogy Prize Winner

=== Articles ===
Wade's articles have appeared in many journals, including the Journal of Russian Studies, of which he edited 11 issues, and the Times Educational Supplement. He wrote on Russian folklore, humour, pop music and animal ecology, as well as changes in the Russian language since the dissolution of the Soviet Union.

- Wade, Terence (1975). "Teaching Russian Across the Ability Range". Journal of Russian Studies. 29: 21–27.
- —— (1978). "A Contrastive Analysis of the Use of Prepositional Phrases of the Types: v + Locative Case and za + Accusative Case in the Expression of Distance". Journal of Russian Studies. 36: 27–34.
- —— (1980). "Indirect Loans in German and Russian". The Incorporated Linguist. 19 (2): 43–48.
- —— (1982). "Akh, uzh eti predlogi! (Problems of prepositional usage in contemporary Russian): 1". Journal of Russian Studies. 43: 24–32.
- —— (1982). "Akh, uzh eti predlogi! (Problems of prepositional usage in contemporary Russian): 2". Journal of Russian Studies. 44: 19–28.
- —— (1984). "The Komsomol and Discothèques in the Soviet Union". Compare. 14 (2): 179–187. doi:10.1080/0305792840140206.
- —— (1985). "Colour Phraseology in Contemporary Russian". Journal of Russian Studies. 49: 48–59.
- —— (1985). "Lexical and other developments in contemporary Russian". Quinquereme. 2 (8): 153–172.
- —— (1986). "Dublenochka, Del'tadrom, Disk-zhokey: Words of the Early 1980s". Journal of Russian Studies. 51: 3–11.
- —— (1988). "Russian Folklore and Soviet Humour". Journal of Russian Studies. 54: 3–20.
- —— (1996). "Using Word Derivations in Teaching Russian". Rusistika. 14: 15–21.
- —— (1997). "Russian Words in English". The Linguist. 36 (4): 102–104.
- —— (1999). "Expressive Syntax. What is It?". Rusistika. 19: 10–13.
- —— (2006). "Eyes Right for Russian". The Linguist. 45: 20–21.

==== Reviews ====
- Wade, Terence (1974). "Trudnosti slovoupotrebleniya i varianty norm russkogo literaturnogo yazyka: Slovar'-spravochnik" [Variant Linguistic Forms in Modern Russian]. Journal of Russian Studies. 28 (3): 41.
- —— (1992). "Moscow Graffiti: Language and Subculture by John Bushnell". Modern Language Review. 87 (3): 813. doi:10.2307/3733052. JSTOR 3733052.
- —— (1996). "Handbook of Russian Affixes by Paul Cubberley". Modern Language Review. 91 (3): 809–810. doi:10.2307/3734194. JSTOR 3734194.
