= Teutonic Knights in popular culture =

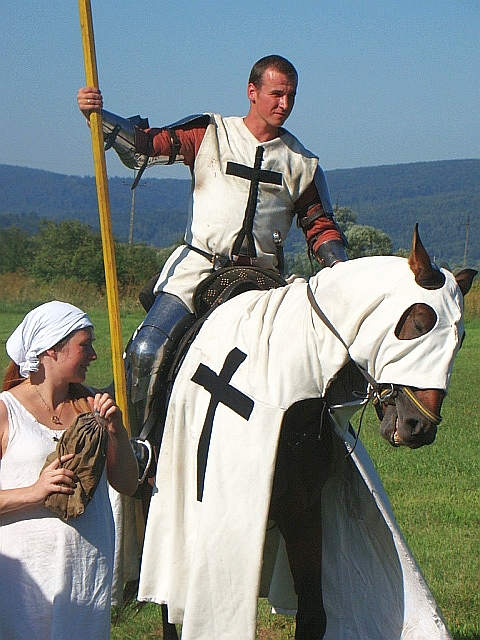
Deutscher Orden-Reenactment, Poland, Sanok-Mrzygłód, 2010

The Teutonic Knights, a crusading military order which sought to establish Catholicism in the Holy Land and the Baltics during the Middle Ages, are often depicted in popular culture.

== Literature ==
- The narrator of Geoffrey Chaucer's "Knight's Tale" is described as having served with the Knights.
- In the chapbook Des dodes dantz, printed in Lübeck in 1489 and in a 1649 watercolour from the Dance of Death cycle by Albrecht Kauw in the cemetery of the Dominican convent of Bern, a Teutonic Knight is one of the representative figures cut down by Death. The knight is notably treated as a particularly dignified character in both, which likely derive from a common source.
- The Order and its relations with Poland, Masovia, and Lithuania are the main subject of Nobel Prize-winning Polish author Henryk Sienkiewicz's historical novel The Teutonic Knights, which describes the era of the Battle of Grunwald from the Polish point of view. A Polish film based on the novel, Krzyżacy, was released in 1960.
- The conflict between the Order and Poland is featured in James A. Michener's historical novel Poland.
- The conflict between the Order and Poland in years 1409–1411 with the Teutonic-Lithuanian conflict and Hansa cities trading business as background is featured in Dariusz Domagalski's fantasy-historical series of novels and novelettes: Delikatne uderzenie pioruna, Aksamitny dotyk nocy, Gniewny pomruk burzy, I niechaj cisza wznieci wojne.
- The Teutonic Knights serve as antagonists in the Conrad Stargard science fiction series, by Polish American writer Leo Frankowski.
- Descendants of the Teutonic Knights play an important role in the novel Le Roi des aulnes (translated as The Erl-King or The Ogre) by the French Goncourt Prize winner Michel Tournier, which takes place in Nazi times.
- Author Bruce Quarrie, an historian of the Third Reich, titled his study of the elite Waffen-SS Panzer Divisions Hitler's Teutonic Knights.
- In the book cycle "The Mongoliad" the Teutonic Knights and some similar rivals are the central characters on a quest to kill the Khan of the Mongols.
- In the 1967 Nick Carter spy novel, The Bright Blue Death, the Teutonic Knights are a neo-Nazi paramilitary organization intent on overthrowing the West German government
- The Teutonic Knights briefly appear in the seventh chapter of The Lady of the Lake, the fifth installment of the Witcher Saga from author Andrzej Sapkowski. Princess Cirilla, a traveler of space and time, encounters them while jumping between worlds.

== Politics ==
- Emperor William II of Germany posed for a photo in 1902 in the garb of a brother of the Teutonic Order, climbing up the stairs in the reconstructed Marienburg Castle.
- German nationalism often invoked the imagery of the Teutonic Knights, especially in the context of territorial conquest from eastern neighbours of Germany and conflict with nations of Slavic origins, who were considered to be of lower development and lacking in culture. The German historian Heinrich von Treitschke used imagery of the Teutonic Knights to promote pro-German and anti-Polish rhetoric. Such imagery and symbols were adopted by many middle-class Germans who supported German nationalism. During the Weimar Republic, associations and organisations of this nature contributed to laying the groundwork for the formation of Nazi Germany.
- During World War II, Nazi propaganda and ideology made frequent use of the Teutonic Knights' imagery, as the Nazis sought to depict the Knights' actions as a forerunner of the Nazi conquests for Lebensraum. Heinrich Himmler tried to idealize the SS as a 20th-century incarnation of the medieval knights. The modern Order, however, was banned in the Third Reich in 1938, due to long-standing belief of both Hitler and Himmler that Catholic military-religious orders were untrustworthy and politically suspect as subordinates of the Vatican, and representatives of its policy.

== Film, music, and video games ==
- The Order plays an important part of the story in the opera I Lituani by Ponchielli (1874), based on Adam Mickiewicz's poem Konrad Wallenrod (1828).
- The historical drama film Alexander Nevsky (1938) depicts the defeat of the Teutonic Knights by the Novgorod Republic in the Battle of the Ice (1242).
- The Teutonic Knights are featured in a variety of historically-themed computer games, including Medieval: Total War, Medieval II: Total War, in which the Order is equaled with the Templars and the Knights of Saint John in power. In the expansion Medieval II: Total War: Kingdoms, a campaign is dedicated to the Order's campaigns. They are featured in Age of Empires II, in which "Teutonic Knights" and "Elite Teutonic Knights" are some of the most powerful infantry units in the game. The Order is a playable country in the grand strategy games Europa Universalis II, Europa Universalis III and Europa Universalis IV, and feature in Crusader Kings II. Teutonic Knights are shown to be occupying the city of Acre in Assassin's Creed, while their Grand Master Sibrand is secretly a member of the Knight Templars. They are featured in Empire Earth II's German campaign as well. The Teutonic Knights are also featured in Sid Meier's Civilization VI on a few scenarios
- Knights of the Teutonic Order (film)
- The Norwegian black metal band Dimmu Borgir used the story of the Teutonic Knights for the music video of their single "The Serpentine Offering".
- The Soviet/Russian heavy metal band Aria's song "Ballada o Drevnerusskom Voïnie"/"Ballad of an Ancient Russian Warrior" (1987, "Geroy Asphalta"/"Hero of a Speedway") depicts the Battle of the Ice.
- Season of the Witch, a 2011 American action horror fantasy film, has Nicolas Cage starring as a crusading member of the Teutonic Knights.
- In the popular anime Hetalia the character Prussia spends a certain amount of time as a personification of the Teutonic Ordenstaat.
- The Teutonic Knights have a small role in Michele Soavi's gothic horror film The Church from 1989. They massacre an entire village in Germany whom they believe to be evil devil worshippers and witches.

== Reenactment and roleplaying ==
The Teutonic Knights are recreated by many re-enactment groups around the world. Many historical and fantasy fighting groups recreate the Teutonic Order, an example are the Teutonic Knights of Daghorhir which encompass two separate units in New York and Texas respectively.

In countries such as England, Poland, and Estonia, the popularity of reenactments of the Teutonic Order has increased with organizations recreating the Order's fights in battle demonstrations, living history exhibits and of course battle reenactments commemorating some of the Knights' famous battles.
