= Peter Newmark =

English professor of translation (1916–2011)

- Born: 12 April 1916; Brno, Austro-Hungarian Empire
- Died: 9 July 2011 (aged 95)

Academic work
- Discipline: Translation studies
- Institutions: University of Surrey

Peter Newmark (12 April 1916 – 9 July 2011) was an English professor of translation at the University of Surrey.

== Biography ==
Newmark was born on 12 April 1916 in Brno in what was then the Austro-Hungarian Empire, now the Czech Republic. He was one of the main figures in the founding of Translation Studies in the English-speaking world in the twentieth century. He was also very influential in the Spanish-speaking world.

He is widely read through a series of accessible and occasionally polemical works: A Textbook of Translation (1988), Paragraphs on Translation (1989), About Translation (1991), More Paragraphs on Translation (1998).

He was associated with the founding and development of the Centre for Translation Studies at Surrey. He was chair of the editorial board of The Journal of Specialised Translation. He also wrote "Translation Now" bimonthly for The Linguist and was an Editorial Board Member of the Institute of Linguists.

Newmark died on 9 July 2011.
