= Linguist (disambiguation) =

A linguist is a specialist in the field of linguistics.

Linguist may also refer to:

== People ==
- Language professional
  - Translator
  - Interpreter
- Polyglot, one skilled in several languages
- Maurice Linguist (born 1984), American football coach

== Periodicals ==
- The Linguist, a bimonthly British journal
- Linguist List (or LINGUIST), an online mailing list

== See also ==
- Language education
