= The Four Wise Men =

1980 novel by Michel Tournier

The Four Wise Men (French: Gaspard, Melchior et Balthazar) is a 1980 novel by Michel Tournier, published by Éditions Gallimard. Ralph Manheim translated the work into English, and the translation was first published in the United States by Doubleday and Company in 1982, and in the United Kingdom by William Collins, Sons in 1982.

It is currently published in English by Johns Hopkins University Press.

It is a variation of the Biblical Magi tale.

Jonathan Baumbach of The New York Times wrote that the words in the English translation were "a mix of modern idiom and literary diction".

== Story ==
The book portrays four, not three magi, with one having a late arrival to important events. This fourth prince eventually goes to Sodom.

== Reception ==
John Weightman of The Observer stated that there was "symbolic magnification" in this book; he argued that it had "incidental good things" though he felt overall it was "a luscious, rather over-loaded fairy-tale".

Kirkus Reviews stated that compared to Gemini, the Four Wise Men has "more narrative enchantment" thematically, and is not as "dense". Kirkus concluded that this is one of the "better" books by the author.

The Washington Post stated that of the novels by the author, this one "may be the most inviting".

Phoebe-Lou Adams of The Atlantic wrote that the work has "a real touch of magic".
