= Jewish military history =

Jewish military history focuses on the military aspect of history of the Jewish people from ancient times until the modern age.

== Ancient Israelite battles ==
While complete details in the Biblical account of a system of fighting forms are not extant, the Midrashic, Talmudic, and Rabbinic accounts testify to fighting and combat strategies used by the ancient Israelites as well as legendary depictions of Israelite combatants.

=== Against Egypt (Late Bronze Age) ===
==== The campaign of Pharaoh Merneptah in Canaan ====
The initial years of Merneptah's reign, the fourth Pharaoh of the Nineteenth Dynasty of ancient Egypt, were characterized by a series of military campaigns, as recorded on the Merneptah Stele. Although the main focus of the Stele is Merneptah's victory over the invading Libyans and Sea Peoples during the fifth year of his reign (1208 BCE), the text concludes with a short poem depicting his victories over various elements in the land of Canaan, namely the cities of Ashkelon, Gezer and Yano'am and the ethnic group Israel:

"Canaan has been plundered into every sort of woe: Ashkelon has been overcome; Gezer has been captured; Yano'am was made non-existent. Israel is laid waste (and) his seed is not."

While some scholars have questioned the accuracy of the interpretation of "Israel" and its relationship to biblical Israel, the majority of Egyptologists concur that it should indeed be understood as referring to Israel, and mainstream scholarship acknowledges a connection between the Israel mentioned and biblical Israel. It appears that the stele was erected after a number of rebellions in Canaan were repressed. The book of Joshua relates a military engagement between the Israelites and the king of Gezer and his troops, though it does not mention that Gezer was conquered by the Israelites. According to Richard Gabriel, Merneptah sent troops to Gezer to limit the Israelite campaign in the Shephelah and to prevent the Israelite advance in the region, in order to keep the road over the central mountain range towards the Jordan river in Egyptian hands. There is evidence that suggests that the Merrneptah stele refers to this campaign.

=== Against Assyria, Aram and Moab (Iron Age II) ===
As opposed to the Late Bronze Age, during which the region was dominated by Egypt, between the 9th-7th centuries BCE the Assyrian empire rose and gradually but aggressively asserted its dominion over the local kingdoms, until its decline at the end of the 7th century BCE.

The initial Assyrian incursions into the western territories, including those of Aram and Israel were initiated by Ashurnasirpal II (884-859 BCE) and his successor Shalmaneser III (859-824 BCE). These military campaigns were ultimately thwarted by a coalition formed among the western kingdoms, particularly in the battle of Qarqar in 853 BCE.

It was during the next century between the mid-ninth century and the mid-eighth century BCE that the local kingdoms, such as Aram, Israel, Judah and Moab, enjoyed a certain degree of independence, with one kingdom occasionally asserting its dominance over others. Such was the case when the kingdom of Israel conquered lands from the kingdom of Aram and when the Hazael led Aramean armies into the kingdoms of Israel and Judah. It was during this period too that Omride kings dominated Moabite lands and Mesha, king of Moab regained hold of them.

During the reign of Tiglath-pileser (745–727 BCE) nearly the entire Near East was brutally subjugated and incorporated as vassal states under Assyrian control. This expansion prompted a resurgence of the coalition and a renewal of the coalition opposing Assyrian dominance, ultimately leading to the conquest of Samaria by Shalmaneser V in 722 BCE. This event marked the dissolution of the politically independent northern kingdom of Israel.

==== Battle of Qarqar ====
The Battle of Qarqar took place in 853 BCE, and was fought by Shalmaneser III, king of Assyria, and a coalition of 11 kings including Ahab, king of Israel. In the Kurkh Monoliths, it is mentioned that the Israelite forces constituted 10000 troops and 2000 chariots.

==== The campaigns of Hazael in the lands of Israel and Judah ====
The Tel Dan Stele, discovered in 1993–94 at the archaeological site of Tel Dan, tells of a seesawing military conflict between the kingdom of Dasmascus and the kingdoms of Israel and Judah, beginning in the mid 9th century BCE. Correlating with the texts of the monolith of Kurkh, the Baghdad text, the Kurbail statue of Shlmaneser III, the Aramean dedications on horse bliders and forehead ornaments, and the biblical text it was most probably erected there during the mid-ninth century BCE by Hazael of Aram-Damascus, in honor of his successful occupation of the prominent Israelite city of Dan. The stele consists of three fragments constituting part of a triumphal inscription in Aramaic. The beginning of the surviving fragments has the lament of Hazael over the conquering or infiltration of the lands of his father by the king or kings of Israel:

"And the king of I[s-]rael entered previously in my father's land"

In the end of the inscription, the speaker boasts of his victories over the king of Israel and his ally the king of the "House of David", who are mentioned as having commanded vast armies:

"And I killed two power[ful] kin[gs], who harnessed two thou[sand cha-]riots and two thousand horsemen. [I killed Jo]ram son of [Ahab] king of Israel, and I killed [Achaz]yahu son of [Joram king] of the House of David."

It is believed that the stele was shattered by the Israelites after they repossessed the city of Dan, in order to protest the insult of its erection by the Aramean king in their land.

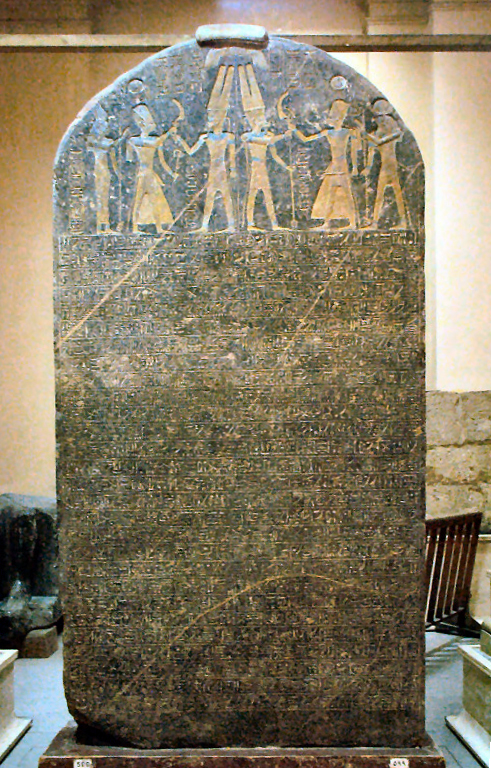
Merneptah Stele

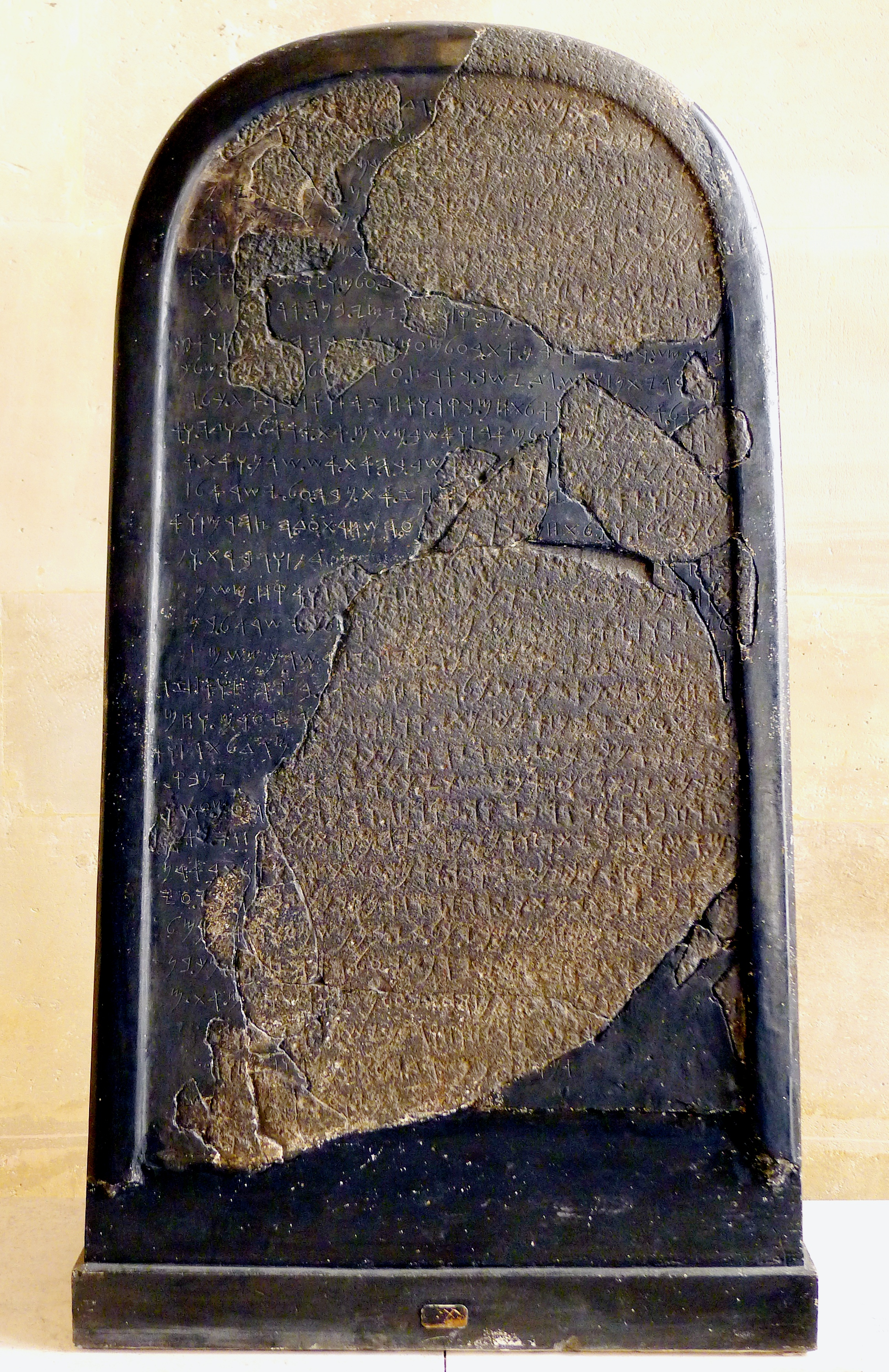
Mesha Stele

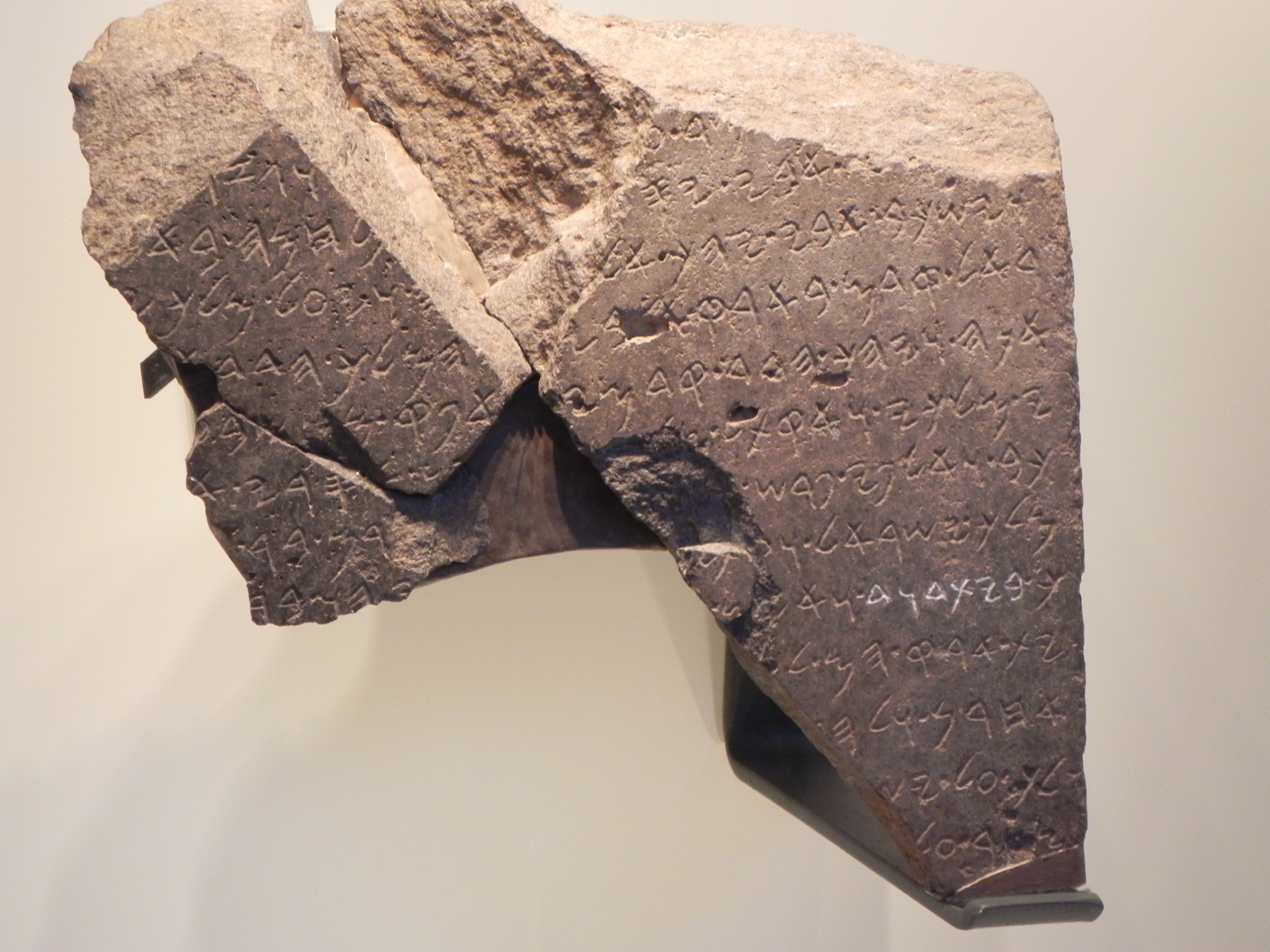
Tel Dan Stele

==== The occupation of Lands by Mesha of Moab ====
Mesha Stele was discovered in 1868–70 and was created around 840 BCE by King Mesha of Moab. Mesha tells how Kemosh, the God of Moab, had been angry with his people and had allowed them to be subjugated to Israel, but at length Kemosh returned and assisted Mesha to throw off the yoke of Israel and restore the lands of Moab.

==== The campaigns of Sennachrib against Israel and Judah ====
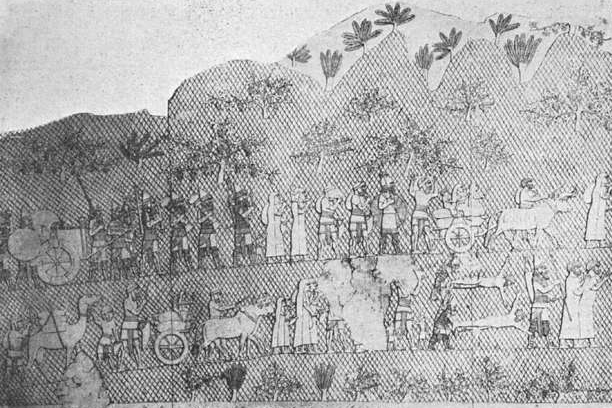
Lachish relief showing the siege of Lachish

Sennacherib's campaign in Judah was a military conflict in 701 BCE between Kingdom of Judah and the Neo-Assyrian Empire, the conflict is part of the greater conflict of Sennacherib's campaigns.

===== Siege of Jerusalem =====
In 721 BCE, the Assyrian army captured the Israelite capital at Samaria and carried away the citizens of the northern kingdom into captivity. The virtual destruction of Israel left the southern kingdom, Judah, to fend for itself among warring Near Eastern kingdoms. The siege took place in approximately 701 BCE by Sennacherib, king of Assyria. The siege failed and Jerusalem survived until its eventual destruction by the Neo-Babylonian Empire under Nebuchadnezzar.

===== Siege of Lachish =====
The siege of Lachish occurred in 701 BCE, by the Neo-Assyrian empire, and ended with the conquest of the town. The towns inhabitants led into captivity and the leaders of Lachish tortured to death. The town was abandoned, but resettled after the return from Babylonia.

=== Against Egypt (Late Period) ===
==== Battle of Megiddo ====
The Battle of Megiddo is recorded as having taken place in 609 BCE with Necho II of Egypt leading his army to Carchemish to fight with his allies the Assyrians against the Babylonians at Carchemish in northern Syria. This required passing through territory controlled by the Kingdom of Judah and Necho requested permission from its king, Josiah. Josiah refused to let the Egyptians pass and a battle took place in which Josiah was killed. The battle is recorded in the Bible, 1 Esdras, and the writings of Josephus.

=== Against Babylon (Iron Age II) ===
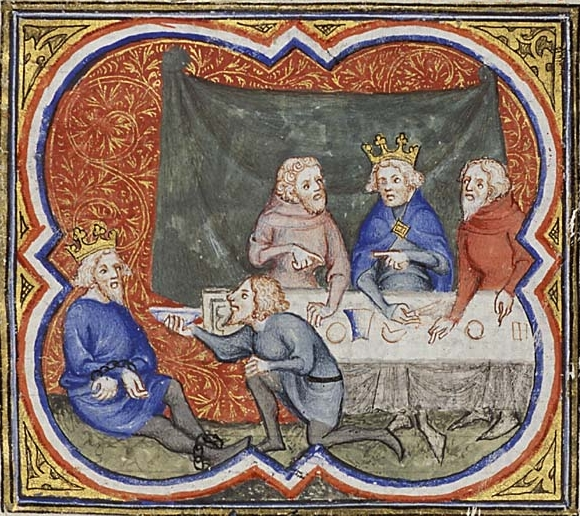
Zedekiah is chained and brought before Nebuchadnezzar, from Petrus Comestor's "Bible Historiale," 1670

The Jewish–Babylonian war was a military conflict between the Kingdom of Judah and Babylonia that lasted from 601 to 586 BCE. The conflict marked the end of the Kingdom of Judah and Jewish independence until the Hasmonean revolt. After Babylonia invaded Jerusalem it destroyed the First Temple, and started the Babylonian exile.

==== First siege of Jerusalem ====
In 605 BCE Nebuchadnezzar II, king of Babylon defeated Pharaoh Neco at the Battle of Carchemish, and subsequently invaded Judah. To avoid the destruction of Jerusalem, King Jehoiakim of Jerusalem, in his third year, changed allegiances from Egypt to Babylon. He paid tribute from the treasury in Jerusalem, some temple artifacts, and some of the royal family and nobility as hostages. In 601 BCE, Nebuchadnezzar failed to invade Egypt, the failure led to rebellions among states in the Levant including Judah. Nebuchadnezzar sieged Jerusalem in 597 BCE, and managed to get in and capture king Jehoiachin, and all of the Aristocracy of Jerusalem. The siege resulted with fall of Jerusalem and destruction of the First Temple. Then Nebuchadnezzar exiled 10000 of the officers, and the craftsmen, and 7000 soldiers.

==== Second Siege of Jerusalem ====
In July 587 BCE, Zedekiah rebelled against Babylonia, making an alliance with Egypt, and Nebuchadnezzar sieged Jerusalem again, starving the people. The siege resulted in the destruction of Jerusalem and the fall of the Kingdom of Judah.

== Classic era ==
=== Maccabees ===
The Maccabees (Hebrew: מכבים or מקבים, Makabim) were a Jewish warrior community who spearheaded a national liberation movement that fought for and won independence from Antiochus IV Epiphanes of the Hellenistic Seleucid dynasty, who was succeeded by his infant son Antiochus V Eupator. The Maccabees founded the Hasmonean royal dynasty and established Jewish independence in the Land of Israel for about one hundred years, from 164 BCE to 63 BCE.

=== In service of the Romans ===
Around 7 BCE, King Herod of Judaea invited Zamaris, a Jew from Babylonia, and his 500 mounted archers to settle in the village of Bathyra in Batanea, in modern Syria, granting them tax exemptions. This settlement was tasked with protecting Batanea from Trachonite brigands and safeguarding Jewish pilgrims traveling to Jerusalem. Additionally, Ein Targhuna, an archaeological site near Massah, Libya, is believed to have been a Jewish military settlement established to defend the area from raids, possibly consisting of troops relocated from Trachonitis by Augustus.

=== New Testament ===
Luke's Gospel refers to "soldiers" among those who heard the message proclaimed by John the Baptist, and who asked for direction on what his call to repentance required of them. Theologian Albert Barnes notes that "whether these were Jews or Romans cannot be ascertained". John's instructions were that they should avoid extortion and false accusation, and be content with their wages.

=== Jewish–Roman wars ===
Judaea, which had existed as an independent kingdom under the Hasmonean dynasty, fell to Roman conquest in 63 BCE. After several decades of rule by client kings, it was formally incorporated into the Roman Empire in 6 CE as a directly administered province named Iudaea. This period saw the deterioration of Jewish-Roman relations, marked by the rule of harsh governors, ethnic and religious tensions in Judaea and other places in the empire, economic discrepancies, and growing nationalistic sentiments. These tensions eventually led to the Jewish–Roman wars, spanning from 66 to 135 CE.

The First Jewish–Roman War (66–73 CE), also known as the First Jewish Revolt, erupted in Judaea in mid-66 CE. Tensions escalated when an ethnic conflict between Jews and Greeks in Caesarea sparked unrest, further inflamed by the Roman governor Gessius Florus, who seized temple funds and ordered two massacres in Jerusalem. In response, Jerusalem's inhabitants expelled pro-Roman officials, destroyed the Roman garrison, and ceased offering sacrifices in the Temple for the emperor. Cestius Gallus, the governor of Syria, attempted to suppress the uprising by invading Judaea but later withdrew for no clear reason from Jerusalem. The retreating force was caught in a disastrous ambush at Beth Horon, where Jewish forces annihilated a force equivalent to a legion. In Jerusalem, a moderate government formed under Ananus ben Ananus, organized defenses by strengthening the city's fortifications, appointing regional commanders across the country, and minting coins symbolizing the new state's independence. In 67 CE, Roman general Vespasian arrived in Judaea and launched a campaign in Galilee, capturing and destroying key rebel strongholds, Yodfat and Gamla. Meanwhile, Jerusalem descended into chaos as rival factions, including those led by Simon bar Giora and John of Gischala, fought for dominance. After Emperor Nero's death, Vespasian left for Rome, leaving his son Titus to continue the campaign. In 70 CE, after a four-month siege, the Jewish capital and rebel center of Jerusalem fell. The Second Temple was destroyed, and the city was razed. Over the following years, Legio X Fretensis subdued the remaining resistance, culminating in the fall of Masada in 73 or 74 CE.

Between 115 and 117 CE, the Diaspora Revolt saw uprisings by Jewish communities in the Roman provinces of Egypt, Cyrenaica, and Cyprus, occurring while Emperor Trajan was engaged in his Parthian campaign. Likely triggered by the destruction of the Temple, ethnic tensions, the Fiscus Judaicus tax, and messianic expectations, the revolts targeted local populations with violence, including mass killings and the destruction of roads, civic structures, and pagan temples. There were also reports of a Jewish rebellion in Mesopotamia, which appears to have been part of a broader resistance against Roman expansion into the Parthian Empire. To suppress the revolts, Trajan sent two of his top generals: Marcius Turbo, who led military and naval operations to restore order in Egypt and Libya, and Lusius Quietus, who managed the suppression in Mesopotamia and an unrest in Judaea known in rabbinic texts as the Kitos War. By late 117 CE, the revolts had been largely quelled. The revolt resulted in the annihilation and expulsion of Jewish communities from several provinces. A victory festival was still observed in Oxyrhynchus eighty years later.

From 132 to 136 CE, the Bar Kokhba revolt took place, representing the last major Jewish effort to reclaim independence in Judaea. Led by Simon Bar Kokhba, who assumed the title of nasi, the Jewish forces briefly established a state in the regions of Judea (excluding Jerusalem) and possibly Perea, even minting their own coins. Ancient sources cite Hadrian's establishment of the pagan city Aelia Capitolina on the ruins of Jerusalem and prohibition of circumcision as key catalysts for the revolt. The discovery of extensive hiding complexes, especially in the Judaean Lowlands, supports reports of large-scale preparations by the Jews. In response, the Romans assembled a massive military force, likely over 50,000 soldiers, to suppress the uprising, while the exact size of Bar Kokhba's forces remains uncertain. The Roman victory led to the near-total destruction and depopulation of central Judea, with every excavated village in the area being razed. The aftermath included mass enslavement of Jewish survivors, and the flight of refugees to caves. The Romans renamed the province from Judaea to Syria Palaestina. Many historians believe Hadrian’s renaming of Judea to Syria Palaestina was intended in part to diminish Jewish identification with the land after the Bar Kokhba revolt, though explicit Roman confirmation of that motive does not survive. The revolt's failure marked a pivotal shift in Jewish history, leading to the decline of Jewish nationalism and the rise of a decentralized people-hood based primarily in later works such as the Mishna.

== Late antiquity ==
=== Himyarite Kingdom ===
In modern-day Yemen, the Ancient Himyarite Kingdom appears to have abandoned polytheism and converted to Judaism around the year 380. Accompanied with a strong military prowess, they proved to be a matching force to the Christian empires of Byzantium and Axum for 200 years. After having conquered a major part of the Arabic peninsula, the Himyarite Empire has been annexed by the Kingdom of Axum.

=== Revolt against Gallus ===
In mid-4th century Jews of Galilee launched the Revolt against Gallus, aiming to defeat Roman troops across Galilee.

=== Exilarch revolt in Persia ===
Mar Zutra II, who came into Exilarch office at the age of fifteen, took advantage of the confusion into which Mazdak's communistic attempts had plunged Sasanian Persia, to obtain by force of arms for a short time a sort of political independence for the Jews of Babylon. King Kobad, however, punished him by crucifying him on the bridge of Mahuza c. 502.

=== Byzantine period ===
In early 7th century Near Eastern Jews launched Jewish revolt against Heraclius, in hopes of gaining an autonomy in Jerusalem with Persian Sasanian support.

== Middle Ages ==
According to a number of accounts various Middle Eastern and Asian Jewish communities, who were either known for their fighting prowess,

=== Samuel ibn 'Adiya Arabian warrior poet ===
Poet and warrior; lived in Arabia in the first half of the 6th century CE. His mother was of the royal tribe of Ghassan, while his father, according to some, was descended from Aaron, or, according to others, from Kahin, son of Harun and progenitor of the Jewish tribes of Kuraitza and Nathir. Samuel owned a castle near Taima (eight hours north of Medina), built by his grandfather 'Adiya and called, from its mixed color, Al-Ablak. It was situated on a high hill and was a halting-place for travelers to and from Syria.

More than for his poetic talents Samuel ibn 'Adiya is famous for his connection with the warrior-poet and prince Amru al-Kais, which won for him the epithet "faithful", and gave rise to the saying, still common among the Arabs, "more faithful than Samuel." Samuel ibn 'Adiya's reputation as a poet rests upon one of the first poems in the collection called the "Hamasa." It is full of warlike vigor and courage, and manifests a high ideal of honor. Another poem attributed to him has been published in Arabic and Hebrew, with an English translation, by H. Hirschfeld ("J. Q. R." xvii. 431–440).

=== Jews of China ===
There are many theories surrounding when Jews first settled in China. Despite trading in China since at least the 9th century, many modern scholars "unanimously" believe an actual community was founded in Kaifeng City, Henan province during the early years of the Northern Song dynasty. However, one of the three stelae (stone edicts) left by the community claims "they entered and settled in China during the Han Dynasty", almost 800 years earlier.

The stele dating 1489 states that Song dynasty founder Emperor Taizu (mistakenly referred to as Ming Taizu) went on military campaigns to "pacify the Under Heaven" during the early years of his reign. When the armies successfully gained control of China and solidified the power of the Song dynasty, Emperor Taizu bestowed the "sinicized" Jewish soldiers with land "to settle and enjoy their occupation in the villages". Jewish soldiers continued to serve in the Chinese military through the Southern Song dynasty. The stele dating 1512 states "those who subdued the enemy and resisted aggression and were 'boundlessly loyal to the country'" were successful in their endeavors. The term "boundlessly loyal to the country" refers to the famous tattoo on the back of General Yue Fei, a noted patriot and martyr. So the loyalty of the Jewish soldiers was compared to that of Yue Fei. The same source even claims that "Israelites" served in Yue Fei's armies and helped to combat the Jurchen armies invading China during that time.

Modern scholars that translate the 1489 stele mention how a physician named Ancheng received a sizable amount of money from "Prince Ding of Zhou prefecture" to rebuild the community's destroyed synagogue in 1421. In 1423, Ancheng was given the surname "Chao" by the emperor himself, received the "rank of Military Commissioner in the Embroidered Uniform Guard" and was promoted to "Assistant Military Commissioner of Zhejiang." However, a journal entry from 1965 formally corrected a translation error that proceeding authors still make today. The physician Ancheng was "apparently a romantic fabrication" and the actual person was "a common soldier named An San, who belonged to the Honan Central Bodyguard Division". He had warned the Yongle Emperor of a plot against him by Prince Zhou, An's military commander and benefactor of the Jewish community, and was subsequently promoted (as mentioned above) and given the "properly Chinese name Chao Ch'eng (Chao the Honest), and in due course became a notable leader of the community and ancestor of the principal Jewish clan."

=== Habbani Jews of Southern Yemen ===
In 1912 Zionist emissary Shmuel Yavnieli came into contact with Habbani Jews who ransomed him when he was captured and robbed by eight Bedouin in southern Yemen. Yavnieli wrote about the Jews of Habban describing them in the following way.

The Jews in these parts are held in high esteem by everyone in Yemen and Aden. They are said to be courageous, always with their weapons and wild long hair, and the names of their towns are mentioned by the Jews of Yemen with great admiration.

There are a number of legends about the origins of the Jews of Habban. The most prominent is that they descend from Judean soldiers who were stationed in southern Arabia by King Herod of Jerusalem during the Second Temple period. Herod dispatched a unit of Jews in the region to assist the Romans with fighting wars in the area. Unlike the Jews of northern Yemen the Habbani Jews wore: Jambiyya (curved knife), Matznaph (turban) and Avne`t (sash).

Benjamin of Tudela (twelfth century) found an independent Jewish warrior tribe living in the highlands of Khorasan near Nisapur, numbering many thousand families, regarding themselves as descendants of Dan, Zebulun, Asher, and Naphtali, under a Jewish prince of the name of Joseph Amarkala ha-Levi. Another independent Jewish tribe bent upon warlike expeditions is mentioned by Benjamin as living in the district of Tehama in Yemen. ARMY – JewishEncyclopedia.com

=== Mountain Jews of Daghestan ===
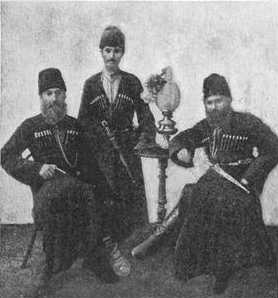
Armed Mountain Jewish men, c. 1900 (1905–06 Jewish Encyclopedia)

And we, the Tats
We, Samson warriors,
Bar Kochba's heirs...
we went into battles
and bitterly, heroically
struggled for our freedom
The Song of the Mountain Jews

The Jews of Daghestan lived isolated and in one of the most remote, impenetrable areas in the world for many centuries. They have been historically known for their fierce and war-like nature. In dress and custom they were hardly distinguishable from other Caucasian fighting people in the region. Though they are considered dhimmi by their surrounding Muslim population, the Mountain Jews owned land and were known to be fierce, not hesitating to defend, by sword or the rifle, their family, religion, or personal dignity.

The Jews of Daghestan greatly resemble the other warlike inhabitants of this mountainous region; and they have acquired the virtues as well as the faults of the latter. There is a tradition among the Jews of Daghestan that they are the descendants of the Lost Ten Tribes; but the history of their wanderings is now forgotten, the written documents which they once possessed having in the course of time been either lost or destroyed. They differ from their Christian and Mohammedan neighbors in speech, using the Tat language, which is a combination of Persian and Hebrew. Their writing is a mixture of square characters and Rashi. They wear the Circassian dress, and always go heavily armed, even sleeping without having removed their weapons.

It is possible that the Mountain Jews are descendants of Persian-Jewish soldiers who were stationed in the Caucasus by the Sasanian kings in the fifth or sixth century to protect the area from the onslaughts of the Huns and other nomadic invaders from the east. Under the impact of the invading Turkish hordes, later generations of Jewish inhabitants of the Caucasian lowlands were forced to migrate even further north to Daghestan.

=== Jews of Tirdirma, Mali ===
According to a West African Arabic record called the Tarikh al-fattash, in 1402 in Tiridirma near the Niger river lived a community of Jews known as the Bani Israeel who were said to have seven rulers, 333 wells, and a well trained army. The record suggests that their presence in the area preceded the rise of Islam.

=== Jewish soldiers of Islamic Spain ===
Jewish soldiers assisted Childeric in his war against Wamba. The Moors are said to have entrusted to Jews the guardianship of the conquered cities of Spain. Under Alfonso VI of Castile, in 1086, 40000 Jews fought against Yusuf ibn Teshufin in the battle of Zalaka, with such heroism that the battle-field was covered with their bodies. Under Alfonso VIII of Castile. (1166–1214) there were many warriors among the wealthy and cultured Jews of Toledo that fought bravely against the Moors. Alfonso X, called "the Wise", while infante, had many Jews in his army; and in the capture of Seville (1298) the Jewish warriors distinguished themselves so highly that, in compensation for their services, Alfonso allotted to them certain lands for the formation of a Jewish village. He also transferred to them three mosques which they turned into synagogues. The cruel fanaticism of the Moors had alienated the Jews, who were now won over to the Christians by the tolerant rule of the latter. Jews fought bravely at the side of Pedro the Cruel in defense of the cities of Toledo, Briviesca, and Burgos, against Henry de Trastamara, his brother, and had to pay for their loyalty to their king either with their lives and the lives of their undefended wives and children, or, as the Jews of Burgos had to do, with a heavy ransom to the relentless victor.

=== Jewish defenders during the First Crusade ===
Jews fought side-by-side with Egyptian Fatimid soldiers to defend Jerusalem against the Crusaders during the First Crusade. Saint Louis University Professor Thomas Madden, author of A Concise History of the Crusades, claims the "Jewish Defenders" of the city knew the rules of warfare and retreated to their synagogue to "prepare for death" since the Crusaders had breached the outer walls. However, another source states the joint Jewish-Egyptian forces retreated from the walls and made their last stand against the crusaders by the Temple Mount, only then going to their respective houses of worship once they were overpowered. According to the Muslim chronicle of Ibn al-Qalanisi, "The Jews assembled in their synagogue, and the Franks burned it over their heads."

=== Piracy against Spanish vessels ===
In response to the Spanish Inquisition, a number of Spanish Jews who had left turned to piracy against Spanish ships.

== Modern times ==
=== The Beardlings ===
In 1794 Colonel Berek Joselewicz raised a cavalry regiment of 500 Jewish volunteers which fought against the Russian Army in the Kościuszko Uprising in Poland.

=== Nili ===
Nili (Hebrew language: ניל"י, an acronym of a phrase נצח ישראל לא ישקר (I Samuel 15:29; transliteration: Netzakh Yisrael Lo Yishaker; literal translation: "The Eternity of Israel does not lie") was a Jewish espionage-network which assisted the United Kingdom during World War I (1914–1918) in its fight against the Ottoman Empire, which occupied Palestine from 1516 to 1918.

=== Jews in the Imperial German Army ===
During the First World War, 100000 Jews served in the German forces. 12000 were killed in action. Thirty thousand were decorated for valor in battle. Among them was the fighter pilot Wilhelm Frankl (who converted to Catholicism in 1917), and the future mayor of Hamburg, Herbert Weichmann.

=== Jewish Legion (British) ===
The Jewish Legion was the name for five battalions of Jewish volunteers established as the British Army's 38th through 42nd (Service) Battalions of the Royal Fusiliers. The initial unit, known as the Zion Mule Corps, was formed in 1914–1915 during World War I, when Britain was at war against the Ottoman Turks, as Zionists around the world saw an opportunity to promote the idea of a Jewish National Homeland.

=== Jewish regiment (Russian Civil War) ===
The Jewish regiment was an infantry regiment formed in February 1919 during the Russian Civil War 1917–1922 as a part of the forces of ataman Grigory Semyonov which acted in the Transbaikal region.

In the early 20th century, Russian Jews were active in a variety of political movements. Many joined revolutionary movements such as Esers, Mensheviks and Bolsheviks. Many Jews served in Makhno's "Black" Army. Others turned to counter-revolution.

The regiment was formed by the Chita Jewish community. The staffers and soldiers of the regiment were Jews from various social classes, from craftsmen to traders' sons. Some Jews were reluctant to accept the Soviet regime after being eyewitness to the Red Terror, instability, and upsurge of crime of 1918. Soldiers and staffers celebrated all Jewish holidays and fought on Shabbat. There were 170 soldiers, 7 sergeants, 4 low rank officers, and 2 captains. Most of the soldiers were from Chita and Nerchinsk.

The Jewish regiment took part in many actions against local partisans. The most significant achievement of the regiment was participation in the defeat of the internationalist partisan battalion (150 strong) camped on the northeastern village of Tupik.... The partisans, mostly Hungarians, were former prisoners of war (POW) who were sent to the Transbaikal region during World War I.

== World War II ==
=== Jewish Military Union (Polish) ===
the Żydowski Związek Wojskowy (ŻZW), Polish for Jewish Military Union was an underground resistance organization operating during World War II in the area of the Warsaw Ghetto and fighting during the Warsaw Ghetto Uprising. It was formed primarily of former officers of the Polish Army in late 1939, soon after the start of the German occupation of Poland.

=== Anti-Fascist Military Organisation (Polish) ===
The Antyfaszystowska Organizacja Bojowa Polish for Anti-Fascist Military Organisation was an underground organization formed in 1942 in the Ghetto in Białystok by former officers of the Polish Land Forces. It took part in the Białystok Ghetto Uprising.

=== Jewish Combat Organization (Polish) ===
The Żydowska Organizacja Bojowa (ŻOB), Polish for the Jewish Combat Organization; called in Yiddish יידישע קאמף ארגאניזאציע) – a World War II resistance movement, which was instrumental in engineering the Warsaw Ghetto Uprising (although the ŻZW Jewish resistance organization claimed otherwise). The organization also took part in other resistance activities.

=== Jewish Brigade (British) ===
The Jewish Infantry Brigade Group was a military formation of the British Army that served in Europe during the Second World War. Although the brigade was formed in 1944, some of its experienced personnel had been employed against the Axis powers in Greece, the Middle East and East Africa. More than 30000 Palestinian Jews volunteered to serve in the British Armed Forces, 734 of whom died during the war.

=== Special Interrogation Group (British) ===
The Special Interrogation Group (SIG) (some sources interpret this acronym as Special Identification Group or Special Intelligence Group) was a British Army unit organized from German-speaking Jewish volunteers from the British Mandate of Palestine. The SIG performed commando and sabotage operations against the Nazis behind front lines in the Western Desert Campaign during World War II.

=== Jews in the USSR ===
During the Great Patriotic War June 1941 – May 1945 Jews of the USSR Served in the Red Army and the Red Navy. Examples:

- General Lev Dovator killed in action 19 December 1941
- General Ivan Chernyakhovsky killed in action 19 February 1945
- Commander Israel Fisanovich killed 27 July 1944
- Sergeant Idel Y. Hait-a submachine gunner killed in battle of Pavlov's House during the Battle of Stalingrad in 1943.
- David Dragunsky, commander of the 55th Guards Tank Brigade of the 3rd Guards Tank Army
- Yakov Kreizer, commander of the 51st Army
- Semyon Krivoshein, commander of the 8th Guards Mechanized Corps
- Ida Segal, paratrooper and medic
- Lev Skvirsky, commander of the 26th Army
- Ilya Ehrenburg war reporter with the Red Army
- Vasily Grossman-war reporter with the Red Army

== Palestine Yishuv ==
=== The Jewish Resistance Movement ===
The Jewish Resistance Movement (Hebrew: תנועת המרי העברי, Tnu'at HaMeri HaIvri, literally Hebrew Rebellion Movement) was an umbrella group for militant Jewish underground movements in the British Mandate of Palestine. The group existed between the years 1945 and 1946, and coordinated armed attacks against the British military. The group was founded after World War II, disappointed in British policies towards the movement.

=== Haganah ===
The Haganah (Hebrew: "The Defense", ההגנה) was a Jewish paramilitary organization in what was then the British Mandate of Palestine from 1920 to 1948.

The predecessor of Haganah was Ha-Shomer (השומר, The Guild of Watchman) established in 1909 (formed out of Bar-Giora which started two years before). It was a small group of Jewish immigrants who guarded settlements for an annual fee. At no time did the group have more than 100 members.

After the 1920 Arab riots and 1921 Jaffa riots, the Jewish leadership in Palestine believed that the British (whom the League of Nations had given a mandate over Palestine in 1920 for the purpose of establishing a Jewish national home) had no desire to confront local Arab gangs over their attacks on Palestinian Jews. Realizing that they could not rely on the British administration for protection from these gangs, the Jewish leadership created the Haganah to protect their farms and Kibbutzim. In addition to guarding Jewish communities, the role of the Haganah was to warn the residents of and repel attacks by Palestinian Arabs. In the period between 1920 and 1929, the Haganah lacked a strong central authority or coordination. Haganah "units" were very localized and poorly armed: they consisted mainly of Jewish farmers who took turns guarding their farms or their kibbutzim. Following the Arab massacres of 1929, the Haganah's role changed dramatically. It became a much larger organization encompassing nearly all the youth and adults in the Jewish settlements, as well as thousands of members from the cities. It also acquired foreign arms and began to develop workshops to create hand grenades and simple military equipment, transforming from an untrained militia to a capable underground army.

=== Palmach ===
The Palmach (Hebrew: פלמ"ח, an acronym for Plugot Mahatz (Hebrew: פלוגות מחץ), Strike Companies) was the regular fighting force of the Haganah, the unofficial army of the Yishuv (Jewish community) during the British Mandate of Palestine. It was established on May 15, 1941, and by the war of 1948 had grown to three fighting brigades and auxiliary aerial, naval and intelligence units. Being a Palmachnik (Palmach member) was considered not only as performing military duties, but also as a way of life. Significant leaders of the Palmach include Moshe Dayan, Yitzhak Sadeh, Yigal Allon and future prime minister Yitzhak Rabin.

The Palmach contributed significantly to Israeli culture and ethos, well beyond its undoubtedly military contribution. Its members formed the backbone of the Israel Defense Forces high command for many years, and were prominent in Israeli politics, literature and culture.

The Palmach was established by the British military and Haganah on May 15, 1941, to help the British protect Palestine from the Nazi German threat. They were also to assist Allied forces with the planned invasion of Syria and Lebanon, then held by Vichy French forces. British experts trained the Palmach special soldiers and equipped them with small arms and explosives. However, after the Allied victory at the Second Battle of El Alamein in 1943, the British ordered the dismantling of Palmach. Instead the whole organisation went underground.

=== Irgun ===
Irgun (Hebrew: ארגון; shorthand for Ha'Irgun Ha'Tsvai Ha'Leumi B'Eretz Yisrael, הארגון הצבאי הלאומי בארץ ישראל, "National Military Organization in the Land of Israel") was a clandestine Zionist group that operated in Palestine from 1931 to 1948, as a militant offshoot of the earlier and larger Haganah (Hebrew: "The Defense", ההגנה) Jewish paramilitary organization. In Israel, Irgun is commonly referred to as Etzel (אצ״ל), an acronym of the Hebrew initials. For secrecy reasons, people often referred to the Irgun, in the time in which it operated, as Haganah Bet (Hebrew: literally "Defense 'B' " or "Second Defense" הגנה ב), Haganah Ha'leumit (ההגנה הלאומית) or Ha'ma'amad (המעמד).

The group made attacks against Arab and Palestinian groups a central part of their initial efforts. It was armed expression of the nascent ideology of Revisionist Zionism, expressed by Ze'ev Jabotinsky as that "every Jew had the right to enter Palestine; only active retaliation would deter the Arabs and the British; only Jewish armed force would ensure the Jewish state". The organization was a political predecessor movement to Israel's right-wing Herut (or "Freedom") party, which led to today's Likud party.

The most well-known attack by Irgun was the bombing of King David Hotel in Jerusalem on 22 July 1946. British authorities condemned Irgun as terrorists already in the 1930s.

=== Lehi ===
Lehi (Hebrew pronunciation: [ˈleχi], an acronym for Lohamei Herut Israel, "Fighters for the Freedom of Israel", לח"י – לוחמי חירות ישראל), also known as the "Stern Group" or "Stern Gang", was an armed underground Zionist faction in Mandatory Palestine that had as its goal the eviction of the British from Palestine to allow unrestricted immigration of Jews and the formation of a Jewish state. The name of the group became "Lehi" only after the death of its founder, Avraham Stern.

== Israel ==
=== Israeli Security Forces ===
Israeli Security Forces is used to describe a group of organizations which are charged with the preservation of Israel's territory and civilian public. The organizations are independent but cooperate with each other, some are volunteer, some are professional, and others are both. The list includes military institutions, government agencies, law enforcement organizations, and first aid organizations:

- Israel Police
  - Israel Border Police
  - Yamam
  - Civil Guard (Israel)
- Israeli Intelligence Community
  - Aman
  - Mossad
  - Shabak

=== Israel Defense Forces ===
The Israel Defense Forces (IDF) (Hebrew: צבא ההגנה לישראל Tzva HaHagana LeYisrael, "Defense Military of Israel", commonly known in Israel by the Hebrew acronym צה"ל, pronounced Tzahal), is the name of Israel's military forces, comprising the:

- Israeli Army
- Israeli Air Force
- Israeli Sea Corps

== See also ==
- Judaism and warfare
