= The Wind Spirit =

1977 autobiography of Michel Tournier

The Wind Spirit: An Autobiography
- English edition published in 1988 by Beacon Press
- Author: Michel Tournier
- Original title: Le Vent Paraclet
- Language: French
- Genre: Autobiography
- Publisher: Beacon Press
- Publication date: 1977

The Wind Spirit: An Autobiography (French: Le Vent Paraclet) is a 1977 autobiography by Michel Tournier.

It was published in English in 1988 by Beacon Press.

In addition to autobiographical details, the author also describes aspects of the creation and conception of his works.

== Reception ==
Kirkus Reviews stated that people following Tournier were the most likely audience for the work; the reviewer for the publication concluded the work was "sociable".

Publishers Weekly described the work as "powerful yet graceful", and that people reading it will "rethink their assumptions" about the author and his work.
