= Eleazar, Exodus to the West =

1996 novel by Michel Tournier

Eleazar, Exodus to the West (French: Eléazar ou la Source et le Buisson) is a 1996 novel by Michel Tournier, published by Éditions Gallimard.

It was translated into English by Jonathan F. Krell, and the translation was published in 2002 by University of Nebraska Press.

== Plot ==
Born in rural County Galway, Eleazar O'Braid grows up a reluctant shepherd, his ambitions of becoming a carpenter having been dashed by the sudden death of his mentor. His years tending flocks on the coastal moors shape his religious sensibility, and at seventeen years of age he enters the Protestant seminary at Downpatrick. There he wrestles with Old Testament theology taught to him by his Lutheran teachers, feeling a stronger pull toward the Gospels and the figure of Jesus than toward Moses and Yahweh.

Returning to Galway as a minister, Eleazar meets Esther Killeen, a Catholic woman whose childhood polio left her lame, but with an extraordinary gift for music. Despite her family's disapproval, the two marry. They have two children: an energetic boy named Benjamin and the quiet, prophetic Cora.

Eleazar's life is upended when, defending a young shepherd beaten by a landlord's steward, he kills the man with his boa walking stick—a snake-headed cane. He and the shepherd dispose of the body, and Eleazar lives in constant fear of arrest. When he encounters the shepherd again at a Galway fair, bearing a scar that mirrors his own, he takes it as a sign and decides to emigrate. The Great Famine of 1845—which Eleazar interprets as a biblical plague—further solidifies this decision.

The family boards the steamer Hope at Cork, bound for Virginia. During the forty-day crossing, Eleazar comes to see his own life as modeled on Moses's.

Landing in Portsmouth, the O'Braids travel inland to St. Louis, where Eleazar hears of California for the first time. Eleazar draws a parallel between California and Canaan, a land "flowing with milk and honey", taking it as a divine sign to travel westward with his family. They join a large wagon train under the guide Macburton but eventually split off to travel alone when Eleazar refuses to travel on the Sabbath, viewing the caravan's disorder and moral laxity as a kind of Babylon.

Crossing the desert, Benjamin is bitten by a rattlesnake. The family is then surrounded by a band of Native Americans led by a chief called Brass Serpent, whose unblinking, lidless eyes recall those of a serpent. Brass Serpent heals Benjamin with a gaze and later converses at length with Eleazar about the nature of the snake as a symbol—fallen angel, desert totem, vessel of malignant inversion. Standing before a withered desert thornbush, Eleazar sees his life as a choice between the Spring (the valley, human life, domesticity) and the Burning Bush (the desert, God, death).

Meanwhile, a Mexican outlaw named José, the youngest member of the bandit gang called the Red Hand, has been secretly tracking the O'Braids. He infiltrates the family under false pretenses, intending to help his gang rob and kill them. But overhearing Eleazar preach by the firelight and observing the family's integrity, José is gradually transformed. When the Red Hand eventually attacks, he defends the family, resulting in a gunfight that wounds Eleazar and kills two of the bandits. The encounter forces the family to abandon one of their wagons and press on with dwindling resources.

As they ascend the Sierra Nevada, Eleazar's wound worsens and he grows weaker. He loses his horse Grizzly and the second wagon to a broken axle. Carried and then walking with a cane José carves for him, he presses on until the group crests the mountains and looks down upon the vast California valley—a plain of orange groves gleaming in the sunlight. Eleazar, weeping, declares it the promised land. He then quietly hands José the guardianship of his family, and walks alone into a small wood to die, as God prevented Moses from entering Canaan.

The next morning, Esther and the children bury him in the clearing. Benjamin, riding his speckled horse Gus and cradling the Irish harp, leads the family down into California.

== Themes ==
The novel reworks biblical source material, modeling O'Braid's journey on the ordeal of Moses in the Sinai Desert. Writing in the Los Angeles Times, author Melvin Jules Bukiet stated that the work compares O'Braid to Moses. Kirkus Reviews described the book as "both an allegory of the strength and persistence of religious faith and a crisp gloss on Joseph Campbell's well-known ruminations about the myth of the hero's journey toward enlightenment".

== Reception ==
Kirkus Reviews stated Eleazar is "One of [the author's] most accessible and attractive books."

Publishers Weekly stated that the work has "a thought-provoking series of twists and turns" even though its writing style is like that of a "parable".

James Hawking, reviewing for the Historical Novel Society, praised Jonathan Krell's translation for capturing "the Biblical style of the original" but concluded "the themes of the potato famine, the wagons west and the tale of Moses make for a crowded 89 pages, and the story suffers in comparison to the original source."
