= Friday, or, The Other Island =

1967 novel by Michel Tournier

Friday, or, The Other Island (French: Vendredi ou les Limbes du Pacifique) is a 1967 novel by French writer Michel Tournier. It retells Daniel Defoe's Robinson Crusoe.

The first edition of the book was published 15 March 1967. It won that year's Grand Prix du roman de l'Académie française. The book ranks 55th on Le Monde's 100 Books of the Century, a list of the one hundred most memorable books of the 20th century, a poll performed during the spring of 1999 by the French retailer Fnac and the Paris newspaper Le Monde.

In 1971 Tournier rewrote the book, adapting it for younger readers, under the title Friday and Robinson: Life on Speranza Island (French: Vendredi ou la Vie sauvage).

== Plot ==
The young Robinson Crusoe is shipwrecked on a desert island that he names Speranza (Hope). Crusoe tries to civilize and control the nature of the island, but is redeemed by the appearance of an "Araucanian" whom he names Friday. Because of the deep change that happens in Crusoe during the stay, he finally decides not to leave the island, but Friday leaves. In some versions, he leaves the island though.

== Reception ==
One review of Friday and Robinson, by Kirkus Reviews, described it as possibly attracting "young people" interested in philosophical debate, and that the "condensed form" makes the story easier to digest though that it also "places some limitations on Tournier's flights of profundity". An earlier entry in the publication described the writing as "spare, existential" and that the imagery was "startling".

Millicent Lenz, in the Children's Literature Association Quarterly, wrote that Friday and Robinson used "terms meaningful to children."

== See also ==
- Le Monde's 100 Books of the Century
