= President's Medal (British Academy) =

Annual award given by the British Academy

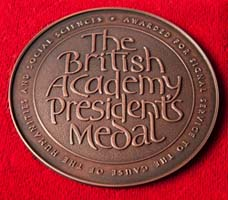
British Academy President's Medal

The President's Medal is awarded annually by the British Academy to up to five individuals or organisations. It is awarded for "outstanding service to the cause of the humanities and social sciences". It cannot be awarded to Fellows of the British Academy and was created to reward "academic-related activity rather than academic achievement alone". The medals were first awarded in 2010.

== List of recipients ==
=== 2010 ===
On 25 November 2010, three individuals were awarded the President's Medal:

- Sarah Tyacke, Distinguished Research Fellow, School of Advanced Study, University of London, "for her service to historical records, in particular through her work as head of the National Archives"
- Michael Worton, Vice Provost (Academic and International) and Fielden Professor of French Language and Literature, University College London, "for his leadership in addressing 'the languages deficit' among British university students"
- Peter Riddell, Institute for Government, "for an outstanding record as the producer of an informed picture of the inner workings of Whitehall, high politics and the party battle"

=== 2011 ===
In 2011, three individuals were awarded the President's Medal:

- Sir Nicholas Kenyon, Managing Director of the Barbican Centre
- Gillian Tett, assistant editor, Financial Times
- Sharon Witherspoon, Deputy Director of the Nuffield Foundation

=== 2012 ===
In 2012, four individuals were awarded the President's Medal:

- Warwick Gould, Institute of English Studies, University of London
- Lord Harries of Pentregarth
- Lisa Jardine, University College London
- Sir John Vickers, University of Oxford

=== 2013 ===
In 2013, four individuals were awarded the President's Medal:

- Shami Chakrabarti, Director of Liberty
- Jean Coussins, Baroness Coussins, House of Lords
- Sir Peter Stothard, editor of The Times Literary Supplement
- Lord Williams of Oystermouth, Magdalene College, Cambridge

=== 2014 ===
In November 2014, four individuals were awarded the President's Medal:

- Peter Brook, Centre International de Créations Théâtrales
- Sir Paul Collier, University of Oxford, "for his pioneering contribution in bringing ideas from research in to policy within the field of African economics"
- Dame Jane Goodall, Jane Goodall Institute, "for her landmark contribution to, and impact on, our understanding of primate behaviours and human evolution as well as her work in youth engagement"
- Clive James, "in recognition of [his] major contributions to Britain's cultural life"

=== 2015 ===
In September 2015, four individuals were awarded the President's Medal:

- Peter Addyman, formerly York Archaeological Trust and Jorvik Viking Centre, "for his significant efforts in making archaeology and historic heritage publicly [sic] accessible"
- Darren Henley, Arts Council England, "for his contributions to music education, music research, and the arts"
- Elizabeth Livingstone, "for her editorial work on successive editions of a major dictionary and numerous international conferences"
- Michael Wood, University of Manchester, "for his significant work in promoting the field of History"

=== 2016 ===
In September 2016, four individuals were awarded the President's Medal:

- Roger Bland, University of Leicester, "for his contribution to the protection, and academic and public understanding, of Britain’s cultural heritage"
- Leofranc Holford-Strevens, "for his significant work copy-editing hundreds of publications across a broad range of languages and disciplines"
- Dame Hilary Mantel, "for her two historical novels on Thomas Cromwell, providing the public with a deep insight into the periods they portray"
- Sir Stanley Wells, Shakespeare Birthplace Trust, "for his lifetime service to the study, knowledge and enjoyment of William Shakespeare"

=== 2017 ===
On 27 September 2017, five individuals were awarded the President's Medal:

- James Stevens Curl, University of Ulster, "for his contribution to the study of the History of Architecture in Britain and Ireland"
- Claudia Hammond, Radio 4, "for her work in improving public understanding of psychology through broadcasting and writing for wider audiences"
- Katie Mitchell, "for her work to enhance the presentation of classic and contemporary theatre and opera through innovative new production"
- Helga Nowotny, ETH Zurich, "for her contribution to the founding and shaping of the European Research Council, and positively influencing the shape of research funding and research policy in the UK and Europe"
- Jimmy Wales, Wikimedia Foundation, "for facilitating the spread of information via his work creating and developing Wikipedia, the world's largest free online encyclopedia"

=== 2018 ===
On 20 August 2018, five individuals were awarded the President's Medal:

- Zeinab Badawi, "for her contributions to international political journalism"
- Dame Frances Cairncross, "for her contributions to economic journalism"
- William Dalrymple, "for his literary achievements and for co-founding Jaipur Literary Festival"
- Andreas Gestrich, "for his contribution to the study of German and Continental European History"
- John Hemming, "for his work in the field of the colonial history and ethnography of Brazil and Peru, and the promotion of the protection of endangered societies"

=== 2019 ===
In 2019, one individual was awarded the President's Medal:

- Ben Goldacre

=== 2020 ===
In 2020, one individual was awarded the President's Medal:

- Margaret Atwood, in recognition of her outstanding contributions to literature

=== 2021 ===
In 2021, one individual was awarded the President's Medal:

- David Olusoga, in recognition of his outstanding contribution to the humanities and social sciences

=== 2022 ===
In 2022, one organisation was awarded the President's Medal:

- Full Fact, in recognition of its work finding, exposing and countering misinformation and misleading claims

=== 2023 ===
In 2023, a podcast was awarded the President's Medal:

- The Rest is History, in recognition of the podcast’s work to promote and popularise history to a global audience

=== 2024 ===
Elif Shafak

=== 2025 ===
BBC Radio 4 programme In Our Time

== See also ==
- Awards of the British Academy
- List of general awards in the humanities
- List of social sciences awards
