= The Bright Blue Death =

1967 novel by Nicholas Browne

The Bright Blue Death is the 30th novel in the long-running Nick Carter-Killmaster series of spy novels. Carter is a US secret agent, code-named N-3, with the rank of Killmaster. He works for AXE – a secret arm of the US intelligence services.

== Publishing history ==
The book was first published in 1967 (Number A277X) by Award Books part of the Beacon-Signal division of Universal Publishing and Distributing Corporation (New York, USA), part of the Conde Nast Publications Inc. The novel was written by Nicholas Browne. Copyright was registered on 15 November 1967.

== Plot summary ==
The novel is set in March 1967.

At the invitation of the Swedish intelligence service, Carter attempts to break into the high security underground military base in Muskö. Deep in an abandoned section of the underground base he discovers a group of German technicians working on a secret project. Carter learns that the project is run by neo-Nazi Count Ulrich von Stadee before the entire group commits suicide by poison rather than be captured.

Inside the base, Swedish engineers led by Astrid Lundgren are working on a laser defence system involving a force field that bends light rays. The force field apparently generates “indigo rays” that have resulted in the premature deaths of numerous laboratory workers whose skin has turned blue thus delaying work on the project.

Count von Stadee is traced to Copenhagen. Carter goes undercover as former Luftwaffe wing-commander, Nicholas von Rundstadt. He and Astrid Lundgren go to Copenhagen posing as lovers where Carter approaches von Stadee to see if he is interested in seizing Lundgren in exchange for 500,000 marks (about USD125,000 in 1967 or USD890,000 in 2014.

Carter and von Stadee agree terms. Carter agrees to hand over Lundgren in the Tivoli Gardens the next evening. Lundgren is fitted with a high frequency radio transmitter so that Swedish security forces can track her. Carter reneges on the handover and he and Lundgren are chased through the Gardens by the Count's men. Eventually, Carter and Lundgren elude capture and Lundgren returns to Sweden escorted by Swedish agents.

Carter follows von Stadee's mistress – Boots Delaney – and kidnaps her in order to persuade von Stadee to give him a job. In Bavaria, Carter joins the Teutonic Knights – a neo-Nazi paramilitary organization headed by von Stadee. Carter learns from an undercover reporter following the Count's men that von Stadee is planning a coup d'etat to overthrow the West German government. Expecting NATO to immediately withdraw its nuclear weapons from West Germany as a result, von Stadee will acquire a nuclear arsenal from China on the condition that the Swedish laser defence system is sabotaged.

Carter learns from Boots that von Stadee invented the bright blue death – a novel virus that he has used to sabotage the Swedish laser defence experiments. Whilst searching for von Stadee's laboratory, Carter is detained by von Stadee and forced to watch how the Count will extract information from Astrid Lundgren after he has captured her. Von Stadee has developed an electric brain stimulator capable of delivering pleasure or pain one million times greater than can be normally withstood. Three seconds' stimulation turns a man into a vegetable.

Carter decides to escape from the Count's castle and return to Sweden to protect Astrid Lundgren. Carter goes to Lundgren's house to find it partially burned down by von Stadee's agents. Lundgren's colleague who is supposedly helping her attacks Carter but Carter shoots him dead.

Carter and Lundgren return to von Stadee's castle in Bavaria to retrieve samples of the virus as evidence for von Stadee's murder of foreign citizens. Radio traffic between von Stadee and his agents around Germany has been recorded also implicating him in a plot to overthrow the West German government.

Lundgren discovers that the virus is simply blue dye. As they attempt to escape they are captured and taken to von Stadee's dungeon. The Count has rigged the castle to explode in 10 minutes time and leaves by helicopter to conclude his coup against the Government. Carter and Lundgren are trapped in the dungeon with Einar – a 1000-year-old reanimated Viking warrior. Carter kills Einar in hand-to-hand combat and he escapes with Lundgren as the castle explodes.

During his reconnaissance of the castle, Carter overheard the location of von Stadee's secret bolthole – Greenland. A few days later, Carter and an Eskimo guide infiltrate and destroy the Greenland camp. Carter kills von Stadee in hand-to-hand combat. West German and US forces dismantle the remains of von Stadee's forces in Europe. Carter and Astrid Lundgren enjoy three weeks' vacation together.

== Main characters ==
- Nick Carter – agent N-3, AXE (posing as Nicholas von Runstadt, mercenary)
- David Hawk – head of AXE; Carter's boss
- Astrid Lundgren – head of Engineering Planning, Musko naval base
- Count Ulrich von Stadee – German neo-Nazi businessman; leader of Teutonic Knights
- Vice Admiral Larson – head of security, Musko naval base
- Boots Delaney – American biker girlfriend of von Stadee
- Gustav Lang – undercover reporter for Der Spiegel
- Einar – 1000-year-old Viking; von Stadee's henchman
- Loki – von Stadee's dwarf henchman
