= Jean Coussins, Baroness Coussins =

The Right Honourable The Baroness Coussins FCIL
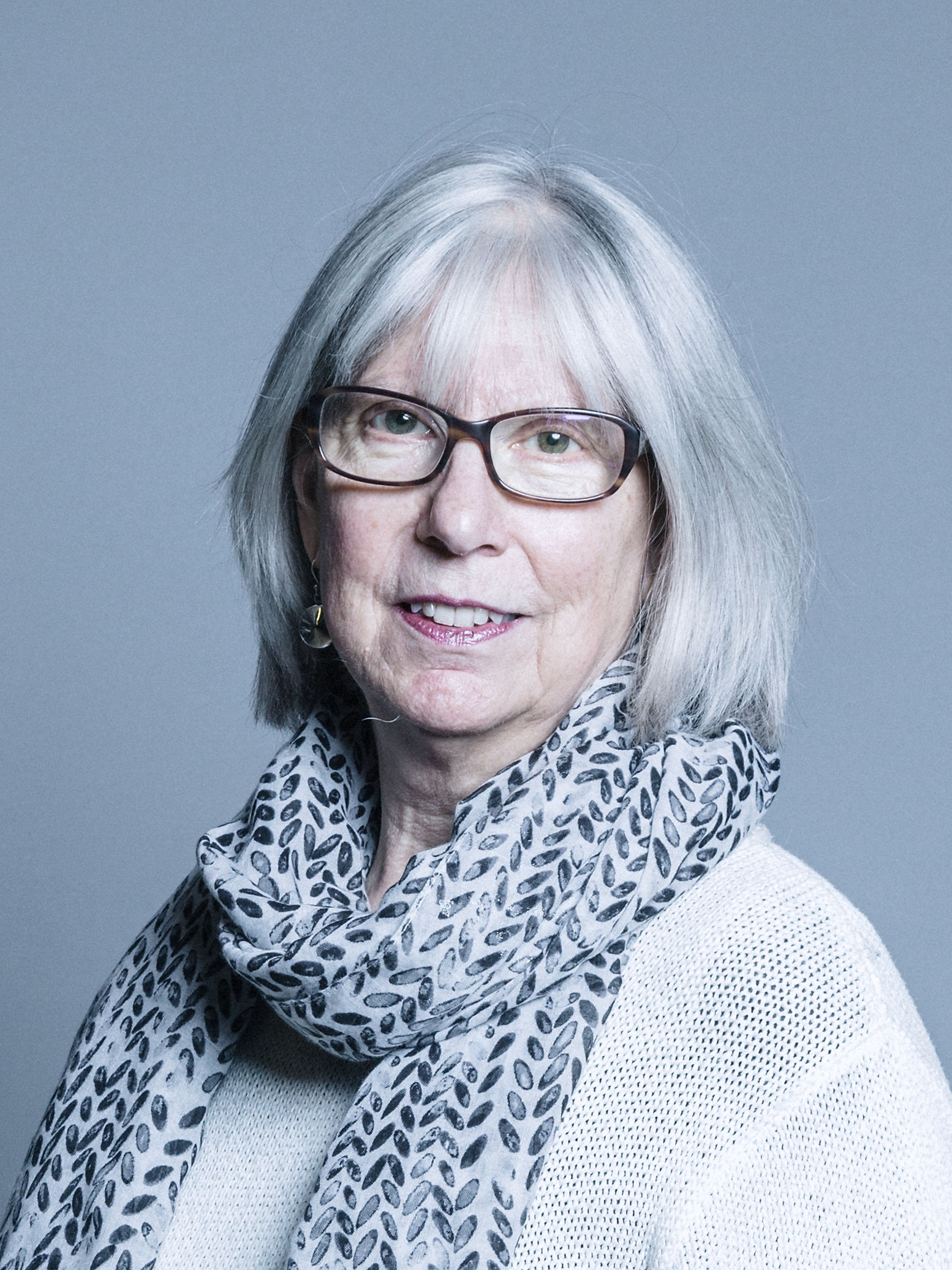

Member of the House of Lords
- Lord Temporal
- Life peerage 23 March 2007

Personal details
- Born: 26 October 1950 (age 76)
- Party: Crossbench

Jean Elizabeth Coussins, Baroness Coussins, FCIL (born 26 October 1950) is a British parliamentarian and an adviser on corporate responsibility.

Lady Coussins is a member of the Advertising Standards Authority, a member of the Better Regulation Commission, and was formerly Chief Executive of the Portman Group. She also served as the Vice-President of the Chartered Institute of Linguists.

== Personal life ==
Jean Coussins was educated at Godolphin and Latymer School, London, and Newnham College, Cambridge, where she graduated with a degree in Modern and Medieval Languages in 1973. She married Roger J. Hamilton in 1976, with whom she has two children; their marriage was dissolved in 1985. Jean has one child with Trevor Carter.

== Honours ==
In February 2007, the House of Lords Appointments Commission recommended she should be conferred with a Life Peerage as a Crossbencher in Parliament; her title was gazetted as Baroness Coussins, of Whitehall Park in the London Borough of Islington on 23 March 2007. She has been conferred Honorary Fellowship of the Chartered Institute of Linguists and is a Fellow of the Royal Society of Arts.

In 2013, she was awarded the President's Medal by the British Academy.

== Arms ==
Lady Coussins' coat of arms is blazoned as follows:

Coat of arms of Jean Coussins, Baroness Coussins
Granted 2007 Escutcheon Gules on each of two pallets Argent between three goblets in fess Or a pallet Purpure. Supporters On either side a heraldic dolphin Argent finned Or holding in the beak a quill Argent spined Or. Motto Quicquid Facias Fac Optime Badge A chef's hat Argent irradiated Or. Symbolism The three goblets represent the grantee's three children. Together with the chef’s hat they reflect the family's interests and connections with food and drink. The grantee was educated at Godolphin School; hence the dolphins which are shown with quills, alluding to the grantee's academic interests.

== Sources ==
- "Better Regulation Commission". Archived from the original on 29 September 2006.
- "The Guardian". London. 15 February 2007.
