= The Ogre (1996 film) =

1996 film by Volker Schlöndorff

- Theatrical release poster
- Directed by: Volker Schlöndorff
- Screenplay by: Jean-Claude Carrière; Volker Schlöndorff
- Based on: The Erl-King by Michel Tournier
- Produced by: Gebhard Henke; Ingrid Windisch
- Starring: John Malkovich; Armin Mueller-Stahl; Gottfried John; Marianne Sägebrecht; Volker Spengler; Heino Ferch; Dieter Laser; Agnès Soral
- Cinematography: Bruno de Keyzer
- Edited by: Nicolas Gaster; Peter Przygodda
- Music by: Michael Nyman
- Production companies: Studio Babelsberg; Renn Productions; Recorded Picture Company; France 2 Cinéma; WDR; Canal+ Heritage Film Ltd. UFA Babelsberg
- Distributed by: Tobis Film (Germany); AMLF (France)
- Release dates: September 1996 (Venice); 12 September 1996 (Germany); 2 October 1996 (France)
- Running time: 117 minutes
- Countries: Germany; France; United Kingdom
- Language: English

The Ogre (German: Der Unhold; French: Le roi des aulnes) is a 1996 war drama film directed by Volker Schlöndorff, adapted by Schlöndorff and Jean-Claude Carrière from Michel Tournier's 1970 novel The Erl-King. The film stars John Malkovich as Abel Tiffauges, a childlike French mechanic whose fascination with children and animals leads him, during the Second World War, from French civilian life to a Nazi elite school in East Prussia. The cast also includes Armin Mueller-Stahl, Gottfried John, Marianne Sägebrecht, Volker Spengler, Heino Ferch, Dieter Laser and Agnès Soral.

== Plot ==
Abel Tiffauges is a French orphan educated at a strict Catholic boarding school. As a boy he is bullied by other pupils and punished by the teachers. He becomes attached to Nestor, an older boy who protects him and introduces him to stories of adventure. When Abel wishes that the school would burn down, a fire soon breaks out. Nestor dies in the blaze, but Abel becomes convinced that he is guided by fate and protected by mysterious powers.

Years later, Abel works as a mechanic in Paris. He has a strong affinity for animals and children, and spends much of his time photographing local children. After a girl falsely accuses him of assaulting her, he is put on trial. The outbreak of the Second World War interrupts the proceedings, and Abel is conscripted into the French army instead of going to prison.

After the German invasion of France, Abel is captured and sent to a prisoner-of-war camp in East Prussia. His practical skills bring him to the attention of a German forester, and he is transferred to Hermann Göring's hunting estate. Abel is fascinated by the animals, forests and ceremonial atmosphere of the estate, while remaining largely unaware of the violence and ideology surrounding him. When Göring leaves after the German defeat at Stalingrad, Abel is sent to Kaltenborn Castle, a Napola school for boys.

At Kaltenborn, Abel becomes a servant and caretaker. He is popular with the boys and is soon used by SS officer Raufeisen to recruit local children for the school. Riding through the countryside on horseback, Abel is seen by villagers as a sinister figure and earns the nickname "the Ogre". He initially believes that he is protecting the boys, but gradually realizes that they are being prepared for war and death. His doubts deepen after a training accident involving a Panzerfaust seriously injures one of the boys.

As the Red Army advances into East Prussia, the older pupils and officers are sent to the front. Abel finds a Jewish boy, Ephraim, among the victims of a death march and hides him in the castle. When German soldiers return and prepare the remaining boys for a final stand, Abel tries to prevent the battle, but is overpowered. Soviet troops attack the castle, which catches fire. Abel rescues Ephraim and carries him through the marshes, recalling the legend of Saint Christopher carrying the Christ child.

== Cast ==
- John Malkovich as Abel Tiffauges
  - Caspar Salmon as young Abel
- Armin Mueller-Stahl as Count von Kaltenborn
- Gottfried John as Chief Forester
- Marianne Sägebrecht as Frau Betta
- Volker Spengler as Hermann Göring
- Heino Ferch as Raufeisen
- Dieter Laser as Prof. Blättchen
- Agnès Soral as Rachel
- Sasha Hanau as Martine
- Vernon Dobtcheff as Lawyer
- Simon McBurney as Brigadier

== Production ==
The film was adapted from Michel Tournier's novel Le Roi des Aulnes, published in English as The Erl-King. The screenplay was written by Schlöndorff and Jean-Claude Carrière, who had previously collaborated on Schlöndorff's The Tin Drum.

An earlier attempt to film Tournier's novel had been made by East German director Rainer Simon during the DEFA period. Simon had approached Tournier in the 1980s with the idea of adapting the novel, but the project was not realized. After German reunification, the material was eventually filmed by Schlöndorff; Filmportal credits Simon as co-author.

Principal photography took place from 25 July to 9 December 1995 in Paris, Malbork in Poland and Norway. The production companies included Studio Babelsberg, Renn Productions and Recorded Picture Company, with France 2 Cinéma and WDR as co-producers, and Canal+, Heritage Film Ltd. and UFA Babelsberg also involved. Production design was by Ezio Frigerio, cinematography by Bruno de Keyzer, editing by Nicolas Gaster and Peter Przygodda, and the score was composed by Michael Nyman.

According to the Los Angeles Times, Göring's hunting lodge was recreated at Babelsberg, while much of the academy material was filmed at Malbork Castle, which the review described as one of the major monuments of the Teutonic Knights.

== Music ==
The score was composed by Michael Nyman and performed by members of the Michael Nyman Band. Nyman later revisited music from the film on the 2006 album Nyman Brass, performed by Wingates Band. Nyman's website describes the original score as being written for an ensemble of brass, saxophones and percussion, and notes that the Wingates Band version transcribed the woodwind material for brass.

A soundtrack album, The Ogre: Original Music from the Film by Volker Schlöndorff, was released in 1996.

== Release ==
The Ogre premiered in Germany on 12 September 1996 at the Residenz cinema in Cologne. The film later received a limited theatrical release in the United States. It opened in Los Angeles in January 1999 and in San Francisco in August 1999.

== Themes and analysis ==
Critics frequently discussed the film in relation to fairy tales, myth and the attraction of fascist imagery. Filmdienst described the film as an ambitious literary adaptation that attempts to examine the fascination of National Socialist cult imagery through its mythical and romantic roots, while also calling the film's intentions somewhat confusing. Scott Tobias of The A.V. Club wrote that the film evokes the atmosphere of a Grimm fairy tale as an allegory for the "sinister magnetism" of Nazism. Kevin Thomas of the Los Angeles Times compared the film with Schlöndorff's The Tin Drum, writing that both works deal with the Third Reich "in epic and ironic fashion, with mythological overtones".

== Reception ==
The film received mixed to positive reviews from critics. On Rotten Tomatoes, it holds an approval rating of 89% based on nine reviews.

Kevin Thomas of the Los Angeles Times gave the film a strongly positive review, calling it "a wrenching, richly imaginative tale of innocence, corruption and redemption" and "a remarkable accomplishment by a master director". He praised Malkovich's performance and the film's visual design, describing it as "a glorious-looking film of both intimacy and scope". Marc Savlov of The Austin Chronicle also responded positively, calling it Schlöndorff's best film since The Tin Drum and describing it as "astonishing, disturbing, and altogether an affecting piece of work".

Peter Stack of the San Francisco Chronicle described the film as "odd and haunting" and "a shadowy gem of filmmaking", praising Malkovich's "complex" performance, though he added that the film was "not entirely satisfying". Tobias, writing in The A.V. Club, called Malkovich's performance one of his best and described the film as "original and accomplished".

Other reviews were more reserved. Stephen Holden of The New York Times wrote that the film had "ambitions and moments of brilliance" but did not feel "unified or even complete", while also noting the strength of the performances by Malkovich, Mueller-Stahl and Gottfried John. David Stratton of Variety found the film's treatment of the novel too didactic, arguing that material effective on the page became problematic on screen.

=== Accolades ===
The Ogre screened in competition at the 1996 Venice Film Festival, where Schlöndorff won the UNICEF Award. The German Film and Media Evaluation Board awarded the film the rating wertvoll, meaning "valuable".
