= The Mirror of Ideas =

Book by Michel Tournier

The Mirror of Ideas (French: Le Miroir des idées) is a 1994 book by Michel Tournier, published by Éditions Gallimard. Jonathan F. Krell was the translator of the English version, published in 1998 by University of Nebraska Press.

It includes 58 essays discussing philosophical matters. Kenneth Baker of the San Francisco Chronicle stated that the author "feels free to take his musings in any direction" because he is a writer by trade. According to Baker, the work "is hardly a skeleton key to Tournier's fiction or biography".

His essays make references to people from various occupations. Several essay titles refer to twinned elements.

== Reception ==
Jann Purdy of the University of California, Berkeley stated that the book is "an interesting introduction to his writing for newcomers or a nostalgic return" for people already reading his works.
