= Tupik =

Tupik (Russian: Тупик) is the name of several rural localities in Russia:

- Tupik, Republic of Khakassia, a village in Spirinsky Selsoviet of Shirinsky District of the Republic of Khakassia
- Tupik, Novgorod Oblast, a village under the administrative jurisdiction of the urban-type settlement of Nebolchi, Lyubytinsky District, Novgorod Oblast
- Tupik, Ryazan Oblast, a settlement in Merdushinsky Rural Okrug of Yermishinsky District of Ryazan Oblast
- Tupik, Sverdlovsk Oblast, a settlement in Verkhnesaldinsky District of Sverdlovsk Oblast
- Tupik, Vologda Oblast, a settlement in Toropovsky Selsoviet of Babayevsky District of Vologda Oblast
- Tupik, Zabaykalsky Krai, a selo in Tungiro-Olyokminsky District of Zabaykalsky Krai

== See also ==
- "Prickly" (in French, "Tupik"), a short story in the collection The Fetishist
