= Choisel =

- Commune
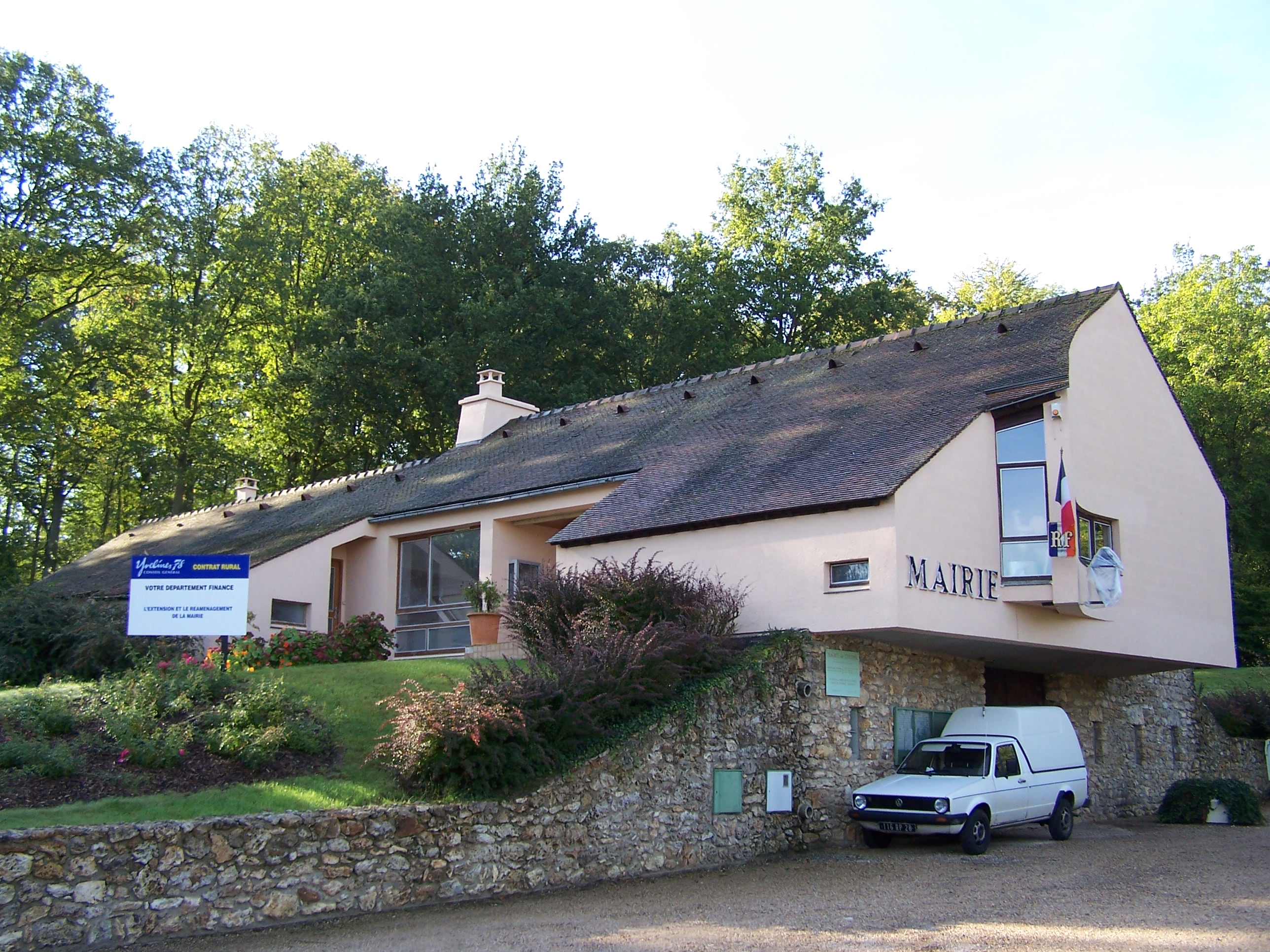
- Town hall

- Coat of arms
- Location of Choisel
- Location within France Location within Île-de-France (region)
- Coordinates: 48°41′14″N 2°01′08″E
- Country: France
- Region: Île-de-France
- Department: Yvelines
- Arrondissement: Rambouillet
- Canton: Maurepas

Government
  - Mayor (2020–2026): Alain Seigneur
- Area^{1}: 8.73 km^{2} (3.37 sq mi)
- Elevation: 85 m (279 ft)
- Highest elevation: 178 m (584 ft)
- Lowest elevation: 89 m (292 ft)
- Population (2023): 540
  - Density: 62/km^{2} (160/sq mi)
- Time zone: UTC+01:00 (CET)
  - Summer (DST): UTC+02:00 (CEST)
- INSEE/Postal code: 78162 /78460
- ^{1} French Land Register data, which excludes lakes, ponds, glaciers > 1 km^{2} (0.386 sq mi or 247 acres) and river estuaries.

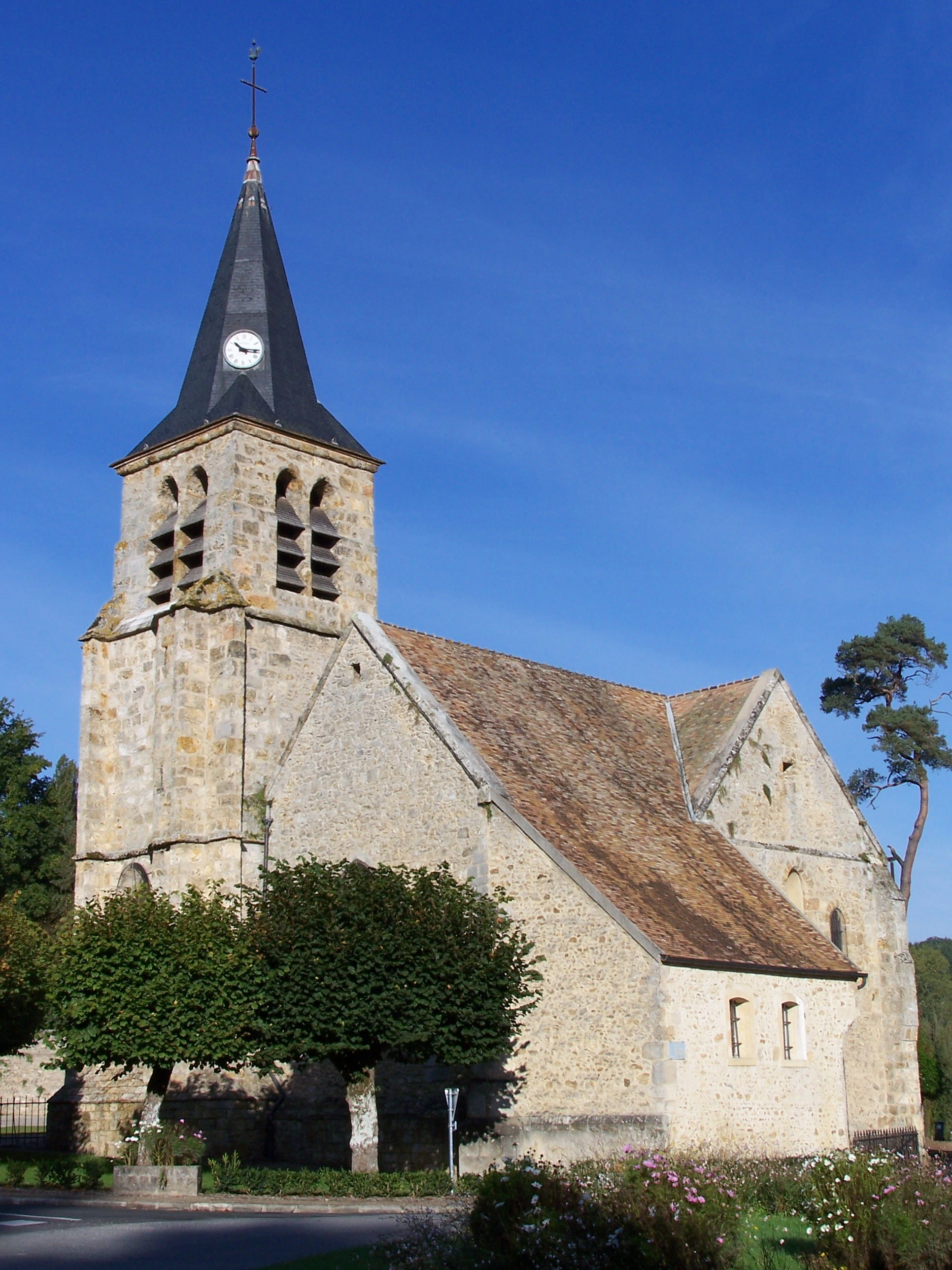
Saint-Jean-Baptiste

Choisel (French: [ʃwazɛl]) is a commune in the Yvelines department in the Île-de-France region in north-central France.

== People ==
- Michel Tournier
- Ingrid Bergman

== See also ==
- Communes of the Yvelines department
