= The Midnight Love Feast =

The Midnight Love Feast (French: Le Médianoche amoureux) is a 1989 book by Michel Tournier, published by Éditions Gallimard.

It was translated into English by Barbara Wright. It was published in the United Kingdom by William Collins, Sons in 1991.

== Story ==
The work starts with a segment about Yves, a man who works in the fishery trade, and Nadège, a woman who is married to Yves. They hold a dinner party where guests trade stories, 19 in all, about romance. The stories of the guests grow more powerful as the night goes on. These stories, much like those in The Decameron, are diverse and explore different facets of love and human relationships. In the end, as the couple part the curtains they realize it is daylight and that their love hasn't disappeared after all. The shared stories had perhaps aided their reconciliation by reminded them what drew them to each other, to begin with.

Yves Oudalle, one-time captain of a fishing trawler who still loves the sea, and his wife Nadège decide to separate and invite all their friends to a party where they plan to announce their separation. The party is a fish banquet in celebration of love and the sea.

The book has references to other creators of literature and old mythological traditions, quoting from it.

The English version partially abridges one of the stories, "Lucie", by five pages.

== Reception ==
Judy Cooke of The Guardian praised the "clarity", wrote that the translation was "excellent", and stated that the book "works at many levels".

Galen Strawson, in The Independent, wrote that the work has "second-rate" content though Tournier's "gifts show through."

Helen Elliott of The Age praised the "literary inventiveness" and that the translation was well done.

A. P. Riemer, a Sydney University associate professor teaching English courses, criticized the censorship in the English translation. He stated that some of the later stories had difficulty in translation due to differences between French and English, though that the translator was "competent and conscientious".

James Saynor in The Observer wrote that the translation was of good quality, and favorably compared his work to those of Gabriel García Márquez and Primo Levi.
