= Gemini (novel) =

Gemini (French: Les Météores, "The Meteors") is a novel by Michel Tournier, published in 1975 by Éditions Gallimard. Ann Carter translated the novel into English, and that translation was first published by Doubleday and Company in the United States in 1981, and by William Collins, Sons in the United Kingdom in 1981.

The English title refers to the duality of the gemini in relation to twins, while the French title refers to any meteorological phenomenon or to meteors.

Currently Johns Hopkins University Press publishes the novel in English.

== Story ==
The novel is about Jean and Paul, twin boys who are called "Jean-Paul" collectively and are similar to the degree that their parents often have difficulty distinguishing them.

== Reception ==
Salman Rushdie stated that the English version was "excellently translated", and that based on the novel, the author "can take just about any idea, no matter how vulgar or disgusting, and give it meaning."

Kirkus Reviews stated that conventional readers would not find as much interest in the book compared to "psychology/philosophy enthusiasts".

John Weightman of The Observer stated that the translation was generally good, aside from a few "slips".
