= The Erl-King (novel) =

1970 novel by Michel Tournier

The Ogre
- Author: Michel Tournier
- Original title: Le Roi des aulnes
- Translator: Barbara Bray
- Language: French
- Publisher: Éditions Gallimard
- Publication date: 9 September 1970
- Publication place: France
- English publication date: 1972
- Pages: 395
- ISBN: 2-07-010627-6

The Erl-King (French: Le Roi des aulnes) is a 1970 novel by the French writer Michel Tournier. It was published in 1972 in an English translation by Barbara Bray as both The Erl-King and The Ogre. The novel received the Prix Goncourt. The 1996 film The Ogre, directed by Volker Schlöndorff, is based on the novel.

Currently it is published in the United Kingdom by Atlantic Books.

== Summary ==
The story is about Abel Tiffauges, who attends the Saint-Christophe boarding-school where he meets Nestor, a privileged student who will take him under his wing and adore him so much as to let him indulge his obsessions. Abel first writes about his childhood and his life in life before 1939 in his personal diary. At the start of World War II, Abel finds himself being a dedicated pigeon keeper and a soldier in Alsace. Then, he is taken prisoner and deported throughout Germany and Poland in East Prussia (German region that corresponds to the current Kaliningrad Oblast/Königsberg in Western Russia).

He will later be imprisoned in the Moorhof camp (close to Insterburg – today Chernyakhovsk – and to Gumbinnen – today Gusev), and will then make it to the reservation of Rominten (in the South-Eastern part of East Prussia), in the hunting ground of Göring he calls "the ogre of Rominten". He then finds himself having to recruit children in the Mazurian region. He saves Ephraïm, a Jewish boy who came from a Lithuanian camp and escapes while carrying him on his back through swamps. The novel ends with the following sentence:

Quand Abel leva pour la dernière fois la tête vers Ephraïm, il ne vit qu'une étoile d'or à six branches qui tournait lentement vers le ciel noir. [When Abel lifted his head to gaze at Ephraïm for the last time, all he saw was a six-pointed golden star rotating slowly towards the black sky.]

== See also ==
- 1970 in literature
- 20th-century French literature
