= Journal of Specialised Translation =

- Discipline: Translation studies
- Language: English, French, German, Italian, Spanish
- Edited by: Łucja Biel

Publication details
- History: 2004–present
- Frequency: Biannual
- Open access: Yes
- License: CC-BY 2.0
- Impact factor: 1.2 (2023)

Standard abbreviations
- ISO 4: J. Spec. Transl.

Indexing
- ISSN: 1740-357X
- OCLC no.: 909884597

Links
- Journal homepage; Online archive

The Journal of Specialised Translation, also known as JoSTrans, is a biannual peer-reviewed open-access academic journal covering research in specialised, non-literary translation. In addition to articles and reviews, the journal contains video material of interviews with translation scholars and professionals from the translation industry. It was established in 2004 with two issues per year. Since 2007, guest-edited thematic issues alternate with non-thematic issues. The founding editor-in-chief was Lucile Desblache (University of Roehampton), who served from 2003 to 2018. She was succeeded in December 2018 by Łucja Biel.

== Abstracting and indexing ==
The journal is abstracted and indexed in:

- Arts & Humanities Citation Index
- Current Contents/Arts & Humanities
- Current Contents/Social and Behavioral Sciences
- Directory of Open Access Journals
- ERIH PLUS
- International Bibliography of Periodical Literature
- MLA International Bibliography
- Scopus
- Social Sciences Citation Index

According to the Journal Citation Reports, the journal has a 2023 impact factor of 1.2.
