= Michael Worton =

British scholar of French (born 1951)

Michael Worton CBE FCIL
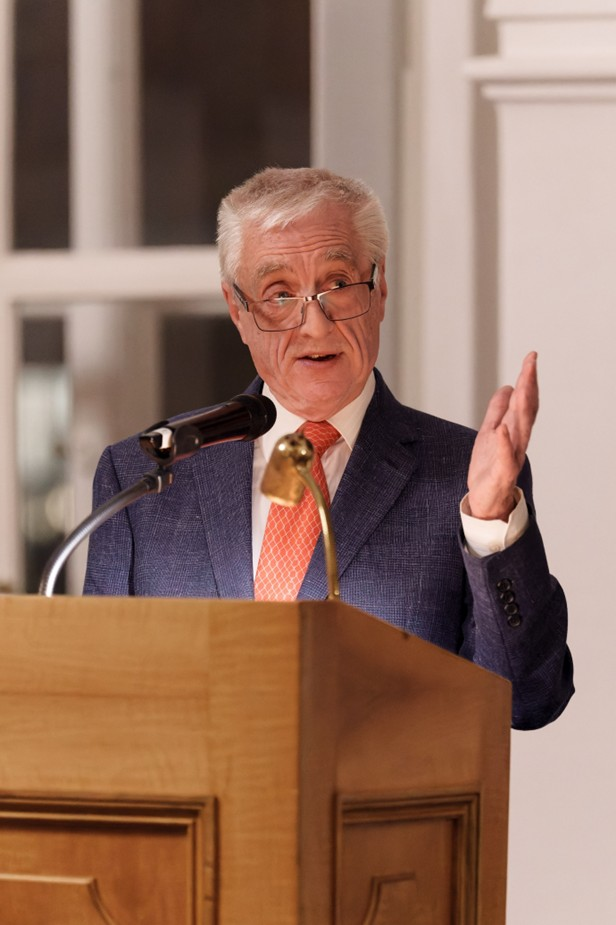
- Worton in 2025
- Born: 1951 (age 74–75); Luanshya, Northern Rhodesia, United Kingdom
- Awards: CBE (2014); Chevalier of the Légion d’Honneur (2011); Officier of the Ordre national du Mérite

Academic background
- Education: Dumfries Academy; University of Edinburgh (PhD)
- Thesis: The evolution of the poetry of Rene Char, 1928-1945 (1982)

Michael John Worton CBE FCIL (born 1951) is a British scholar of French. From 1998 until 2013, he was Vice-Provost (Teaching and Learning; Academic; and International) of University College London (UCL). He held this appointment concurrently with the university's Fielden Professorship of French Language and Literature. He retired at the end of September 2013. In light of how his research had expanded over the years into many disciplines, UCL awarded him the title of emeritus Professor of Arts.

In 2009, he wrote Review of Modern Foreign Languages Provision in Higher Education in England for the UK Government, and he continues to promote the centrality of modern languages in education. He also champions the role of the creative and performing arts in education and research and is a passionate advocate of interdisciplinarity in research.

== Early life and education ==
Worton was born in Luanshya, Northern Rhodesia (now Zambia), of a Yorkshire father and Scottish mother. Worton's family returned to Scotland when he was still of primary-school age, and he was educated at Sanquhar Academy and then Dumfries Academy, and the University of Edinburgh for his MA and PhD degrees.

Worton's first post (1976) was as lecturer in French at the University of Liverpool. He then moved to UCL (1980), initially as lecturer in French Language and Literature, and successively: Senior Lecturer in French (1991); Professor of French (Personal Chair) and Dean of the Faculty of Arts(1994); appointed to the Fielden Chair of French Language and Literature (1998). He has lectured around the world on issues in French Literature, gender studies, painting and photography, critical theory and pedagogy. Since 1998, when he was appointed Vice-Provost of UCL, he has also spoken around the world on issues in higher education policy and practice.

=== Honours and awards ===
Worton was appointed Commander of the Order of the British Empire (CBE) in the 2014 Birthday Honours for services to higher education.

- 1998: Chevalier dans l'Ordre des Palmes Académiques
- 2005: Promoted to Officier dans l'Ordre des Palmes Académiques
- 2009: Medal of Honoured Worker in Education of the Republic of Kazakhstan
- 2009: Honorary Fellow of UCL
- 2010: British Academy President's Medal
- 2010: Honorary Fellow of the Chartered Institute of Linguists
- 2010: President's Medal by the British Academy; "for his leadership in addressing 'the languages deficit' among British university students"
- 2011: Chevalier de la Légion d’Honneur, conferred in February 2012 by Prime Minister M. François Fillon at the Hôtel Matignon
- 2013: Award for Outstanding Service, Institute of International Education IIE
- 2014: Commander of the British Empire (CBE)
- 2014: Honorary Doctorate of Literature (DLit), UCL
- 2022: Officier de l’Ordre national du Mérite
- 2025: Honorary doctorate conferred by Mozarteum University, Salzburg

=== Vice-Provost of UCL (1998-2013) and retirement ===
He was committed to curriculum reform in the context of the globalized 21st century, notably leading on the creation of a Bachelor of Arts and Sciences (BASc) which started in 2012 and on UCL's pioneering work on global citizenship.

He was also instrumental in establishing the UCL Academy, which opened in 2012, the first school in England with a university as sole sponsor.

On the international front, Worton led the negotiations that saw UCL establishing its first overseas campuses, in Australia and Qatar, as well as a 5-year partnership with Nazarbayev University in Kazakhstan.

While the overseas campuses were successes academically and financially, they were not without controversy, and UCL Australia was closed in 2017 and UCL Qatar in 2020.

In retirement, Worton continues to engage in university development, notably as Chair of the Strategic Directions Committee of PSL Université Paris and co-chairing the jury of the RCM at the Mozarteum University, Salzburg.

Worton has always been committed to voluntary and charitable work, Since retiring, his work has included: the Anglo-Austrian Society (Board Secretary); CARA (Council for At-Risk Academics; Director and Trustee 2007–2019; Chair 2019–2023); Advisory Board of the DSC Prize for South Asian Literature (Member); Heritage Without Borders (Chair 2014–2017) (dissolved 2017); Council of RADA (Member 2013–2022); Advisory Board of the Ruskin Museum and Research Institute (chair)
