= The Fetishist (Tournier book) =

Book by Michel Tournier

The Fetishist (French: Le Coq de bruyère) is a short story collection by Michel Tournier, first published in 1978, by Éditions Gallimard. Barbara Wright was the translator of the English version, which was published by Doubleday in the United States in 1984, and by William Collins, Sons in the United Kingdom in 1983.

Bob Halliday of the Washington Post wrote, that the works feature characters who were "sent of [sic] [meaning "off"] the rails by natural instincts that have been bent or misfocused."

The volume's title in the French version is taken from the story "The Woodcock," titled in French as "Coq de bruyère," while the English version is titled after "The Fetishist" ("Le Fétichiste"). John Weightman of New York Review of Books stated his belief that the publishers of the English volume chose a different title because "The Woodcock" would "be too blank and unispiring [sic] as a general heading" as the English language does not use those birds to represent sexuality, while the new title, in Weightman's words, "gives a strong flavor of kinkiness to the whole volume."

== Contents ==
There are fourteen stories in total.

They are, in order in the English version:

- Tristan Vox
- Amandine, or The Two Gardens (Amandine et les deux jardins)
  - In regards to Amandine, a child character, Halliday described her as "articulate" and representing the idea of "Innocence about to be lost". Halliday compared her to Sophie von Faninal from Der Rosenkavalier, and stated that she "bears no resemblance to any living child." Halliday argued the story is "especially unconvincing."
- Tom Thumb Runs Away (La Fugue du Petit Poucet)
- Prickly (Tupik)
  - The story has a boy as a protagonist, described by Halliday as "sexually confused". The boy is nicknamed, in the French version, Tupik, from "Tu piques!" W. D. Redfern describes the boy's mother as "soft and feminine, perfurmed and powdered" while the father is "prickly" and "insensitive". The boy feels upset over being male and prefers being female, and so he uses a razor to change his own gender. Halliday described the ending as "gruesome" and stated that Prickly at the end is "far more of a demonstration of thesis than a character". Halliday argued the story is "especially unconvincing."
- Jesu, Joy of Man's Desiring (Que ma joie demeure)
- The Woodcock (Le Coq de bruyère)
- The Adam Family (La Famille Adam)
- The Red Dwarf (Le Nain rouge)
- The End of Robinson Crusoe (La Fin de Robinson Crusoé)
- Veronica's Shrouds (Les Suaires de Véronique)
- Death and the Maiden (La Jeune Fille et la Mort)
- Mother Christmas (La Mère Noël)
- The Lily of the Valley Rest Area (L'Aire du muguet)
- The Fetishist (Le Fétichiste)

== Reception ==
Victor Brombert of The New York Times argued that the works are "at once opulent and precise".

Halliday argued that the translation was done "wonderfully" but he argued that the novel format worked better for Tournier's works compared to the short story format.

Valentine Cunningham, in The Observer, stated that the works were "engaging" and that they had characters with "grotesque fascinations" who face "disastrous" resolutions.

Hugh Hebert, in The Guardian, wrote that the majority of "perversions" in the work "are commonplace enough" and that the "perversion" is not as severe as such in Marquis de Sade's stories.

Nicholas Spice of the London Review of Books overall praised the translation; he argued that sometimes there were "un-English Latinisms" "now and again", but that the "basic strength" was demonstrated in a theatrical performance of The Fetishist he saw.
