= Chartered Institute of Linguists =

UK professional body

- Abbreviation: CIOL
- Predecessor: Institute of Linguists
- Formation: 1910
- Legal status: Incorporated by Royal Charter
- Purpose: For Languages and Linguists
- Headquarters: London
- Members: c5,000
- Patron: Prince Michael of Kent
- Honorary President: Baroness Coussins Hon FCIL
- Chair: Stephen Doswell MCIL CL
- Chief Executive: John Worne
- Website: www.ciol.org.uk

Founded as the Institute of Linguists in 1910, the Chartered Institute of Linguists (CIOL) received its royal charter in 2005 and is the UK's not-for-profit royal charter body for languages and linguists.

CIOL supports linguists in their careers and lives and promotes proficiency in languages worldwide.

Professional grades of membership are: Associate (ACIL), Member (MCIL) and Fellow (FCIL) and there are also several Affiliate grades of membership.

CIOL also hosts the IoL Educational Trust (IoLET), a charitable company limited by guarantee and an accredited awarding organisation. IoLET's purpose is to promote the teaching and study of modern languages.

The patron of CIOL is HRH Prince Michael of Kent.

It has a magazine, The Linguist.

== Qualifications and assessments ==
Qualifications include the:

- Diploma in Translation (DipTrans) – Level 7 – the gold-standard Master's-level qualification for work as a translator
- Certificate in Translation (CertTrans) – Level 6 – a benchmark Degree-level qualification for translation and work in international organisations
- Diploma in Public Service Interpreting (DPSI) – Level 6; required for police and court interpreting and recommended for health and wider public services

CIOL also offers Language Level Assessments and Certification of English speaking skills.

== Notable fellows and honorary fellows ==
- Donald Adamson (Hon FCIL)
- Baroness Coussins (Hon FCIL)
- Mary Creagh MP
- David Crystal (Hon FCIL)
- Andrew Dalby (Hon FCIL)
- Susie Dent (Hon FCIL and Vice-President)
- Baroness Garden (Hon FCIL)
- Susan Price
- Sir Ivor Roberts
- Peter Sutton
- Diana Wallis MEP (Hon FCIL)
- Michael Worton (Hon FCIL)
