= The Linguist =

Professional journal and magazine

- Editor: Miranda Moore
- Frequency: Quarterly
- Publisher: Halcyon Print Management
- Country: United Kingdom
- Website: www.ciol.org.uk/the-linguist
- ISSN: 0268-5965
- OCLC: 13411010

The Linguist (formerly The Incorporated Linguist) is the quarterly journal and magazine of the UK's Chartered Institute of Linguists (CIOL), whose headquarters is in London.

== History and profile ==
The journal was established in 1962. The Linguist includes news about CIOL, articles on translation and interpreting, bilingualism and language use, as well as book reviews and current opinions.

The editor is Miranda Moore. The late Professor Peter Newmark was a regular contributor, whose wide-ranging column was entitled "Translation Now", as was Andrew Dalby with "Notes in the Margin".
