= Michel Tournier =

French writer (1924–2016)

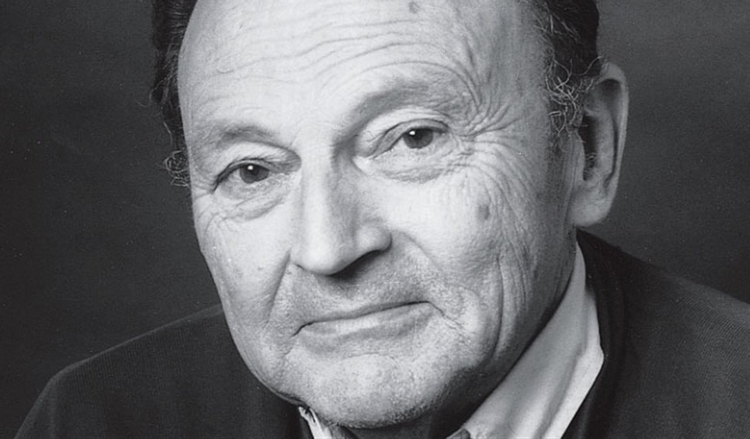
- Born: 19 December 1924; Paris, France
- Died: 18 January 2016 (aged 91); Choisel, Île-de-France, France
- Education: Sorbonne
- Writing career
- Notable awards: Grand Prix du roman de l'Académie française Prix Goncourt

Michel Tournier (French: [miʃɛl tuʁnje]; 19 December 1924 − 18 January 2016) was a French writer. He won awards such as the Grand Prix du roman de l'Académie française in 1967 for Friday, or, The Other Island and the Prix Goncourt for The Erl-King in 1970. His inspirations included traditional German culture, Catholicism and the philosophies of Gaston Bachelard. He resided in Choisel and was a member of the Académie Goncourt. His autobiography has been translated and published as The Wind Spirit (Beacon Press, 1988). He was on occasion in contention for the Nobel Prize in Literature.

== Biography ==
Born in France of parents who met at the Sorbonne while studying German, Tournier spent his youth in Saint-Germain-en-Laye. He learned German early, staying each summer in Germany. He studied philosophy at the Sorbonne and at the university of Tübingen and attended Maurice de Gandillac's course. He wished to teach philosophy at high-school but, like his father, failed to obtain the French agrégation.

Tournier joined Radio France as a journalist and translator and hosted L'heure de la culture française. In 1954 he worked in advertisement for Europe 1. He also collaborated for Le Monde and Le Figaro. From 1958 to 1968, Tournier was the chief editor of Plon. In 1967 Tournier published his first book, Vendredi ou les Limbes du Pacifique, a retelling of Daniel Defoe's Robinson Crusoe, for which he was awarded the Grand Prix du roman de l'Académie française.

He co-founded in 1970, with the Arles photographer Lucien Clergue and the historian Jean-Maurice Rouquette, the Rencontres d'Arles. At the same time he produced for television some fifty issues of the monthly program Chambre noire, devoted to photography interviewing a photographer for each program.

Tournier died on 18 January 2016 in Choisel, France at the age of 91.

== Selected works ==
- Vendredi ou les Limbes du Pacifique (Friday) (1967) - Grand Prix du roman de l'Académie française
- Le Roi des aulnes (1970) (Published in 1972 in an English translation by Barbara Bray as both The Erl-King and The Ogre)
  - Le Roi des aulnes was made into a 1996 movie Der Unhold (The Ogre) directed by Volker Schlöndorff and has also been adapted for the stage by Tom Perrin in 2002.
- Les Météores (Gemini, 1975)
- Le Vent Paraclet (The Wind Spirit, 1977)
- Vendredi ou la Vie sauvage (Friday and Robinson, 1972)
- Le Coq de bruyère (The Fetishist and Other Stories, 1978)
- Gaspard, Melchior et Balthazar (The Four Wise Men, 1980)
- Le Vol du vampire (1981)
- Gilles et Jeanne (Gilles and Jeanne, 1983)
- La Goutte d'or (The Golden Droplet, 1986)
- Petites Proses (1986)
- Le Médianoche amoureux (The Midnight Love Feast, 1989)
- La Couleuvrine (1994)
- Le Miroir des idées (The Mirror of Ideas, 1994)
- Eléazar ou la Source et le Buisson (Eleazar, Exodus to the West, 1996)
- Journal extime (2002)
