= Lazarus Aaronson =

British poet and lecturer

Lazarus Aaronson MBE
- Born: Lazarus Leonard Aaronson; 24 December 1894; Spitalfields, London, England
- Died: 9 December 1966 (aged 71); Harpenden, Hertfordshire, England
- Occupations: Poet; lecturer
- Years active: 1930–1966
- Known for: Whitechapel Boys
- Spouses: Lydia Sherwood (m. 1924–1931); Dorothy Beatrice Lewer (m. 1938–1948); Olive Ireson (m. 1950–1966)
- Children: 1

Lazarus Leonard Aaronson MBE (24 December 1894 – 9 December 1966), often referred to as L. Aaronson, was a British poet and a lecturer in economics. As a young man, he belonged to a group of Jewish friends who are today known as the Whitechapel Boys, many of whom later achieved fame as writers and artists. Though less radical in his use of language, he has been compared to his more renowned Whitechapel friend, Isaac Rosenberg, in terms of diction and verbal energy. Aaronson's poetry is characterised more as 'post-Georgian' than modernistic, and reviewers have since been able to trace influences back to both the English poet John Keats, and Hebrew poets such as Shaul Tchernichovsky and Zalman Shneur.

Aaronson lived most of his life in London and spent much of his working life as a lecturer in economics at the City of London College. In his twenties, he converted to Christianity and a large part of his poetry focused on his conversion and spiritual identity as a Jew and an Englishman. In total, he published three collections of poetry: Christ in the Synagogue (1930), Poems (1933), and The Homeward Journey and Other Poems (1946). Although he did not achieve widespread recognition, Aaronson gained a cult following of dedicated readers. Upon retiring from teaching, he moved to Harpenden, Hertfordshire, where he died from heart failure and coronary heart disease on 9 December 1966. His poetry was not widely publicised, and he left many unpublished poems at his death.

== Life and career ==
Aaronson was born on 24 December 1894 (Note: The Palgrave Dictionary of Anglo-Jewish History, and some other sources, lists Aaronson's date of birth as 24 December 1894, while the later and more comprehensive entry in the Oxford Dictionary of National Biography gives it as 18 February 1895.) at 34 Great Pearl Street, Spitalfields in the East End of London to poor Orthodox Jewish parents who had immigrated from Vilna in the Pale of Settlement in Eastern Europe. His father was Louis Aaronson, a bootmaker, and his mother was Sarah Aaronson, née Kowalski. He attended Whitechapel City Boys' School and later received a scholarship to attend Hackney Downs Grammar School.

His father emigrated to New York in 1905. The rest of the family followed in 1912, except for 17-year old Lazarus who remained in London. From then on, he lived with the family of Joseph Posener at 292 Commercial Road in the East End of London. At the time, the area was a hub of the Jewish diaspora and at the turn of the 20th century, a quarter of its population were Jews from Central and Eastern Europe. Growing up in the East End, Aaronson was part of a group of friends who are today referred to as the Whitechapel Boys, all of whom were children of Jewish immigrants and shared literary and artistic ambitions. Others in the group who, like Aaronson, later achieved distinction included John Rodker, Isaac Rosenberg, Joseph Leftwich, Stephen Winsten, Clara Birnberg, David Bomberg, and the brothers Abraham Fineberg and Joseph Fineberg. Aaronson was also involved in the Young Socialist League, where he and other Whitechapel Boys helped organise educational meetings on modern art and radical politics. Aaronson remained a committed socialist throughout adulthood.

The Stake

All that I am is staked on words.
Bless their meaning, Lord, or I become
Slave to the heavy, hollow, mindless drum.

Make me the maker of my words.
Let me renew myself in my own speech,
Till I become at last the thing I teach.

And let a taste be in my words,
That men may savour what is man in me,
And know how much I fail, how little see.

Let not my pleasure in my words
Forget the silence whence all speech has sprung,
The cell and meditation of the tongue.

And at the end, the Word of words,
Lord! make my dedication. Let me live
Towards Your patient love that can forgive

The blasphemy and pride of words
Since once You spoke. Your praise is there.
I mean it thus, even in my despair.

— The Homeward Journey and Other Poems, 1946

Having been diagnosed with tuberculosis and diabetes, Aaronson did not serve in the military during the First World War. Between 1913 and 1915, and again between 1926 and 1928, he studied economics with a special focus on public administration at the London School of Economics, but never completed his degree.

Aaronson was married three times. His first wife was the actress Lydia Sherwood (1906–1989), whom he was married to between 1924 and 1931. He filed for divorce on grounds of her adultery with the theatre producer Theodore Komisarjevsky, and the much publicised suit was undefended. His second marriage, which took place on 9 July 1938, to Dorothy Beatrice Lewer (1915–2005), also ended in divorce. On 14 January 1950, Aaronson married Margaret Olive Ireson (1920–1981), with whom he had one son, David, who was born in 1953. (Note: Aaronson's first wife was born as Lily Shavelson, but took the name Lydia Sherwood. The second wife Dorothy Beatrice Lewer subsequently married the geriatrician Oscar Olbrich. The third wife was born as Margaret Olive Axford, but had previously been married to the French scholar John Clifford Ireson and bore his surname.)

To friends and family, Lazarus Aaronson was known as Laz. He was friends with the novelist Stephen Hudson, the sculptor Jacob Epstein, the media mogul Sidney Bernstein, the artists Mark Gertler and Matthew Smith and the poets Harold Monro, Louis MacNeice and Samuel Beckett. Aaronson was also close to the economist Graham Hutton, who in 1952 made a radio programme about him for the BBC.

Around 1934, he began working as a lecturer in economics at the City of London College. Upon his retirement from the university in 1958, Aaronson was made a Member of the Order of the British Empire in the 1959 New Year Honours, in recognition of more than twenty-five years of service. The same year he moved with his family from London to Harpenden in Hertfordshire, where he later died from coronary heart disease and heart failure on 9 December 1966, at the age of 71. He was buried in the Westfield Road Cemetery in Harpenden. His wife and young son survived him.

== Poetry ==
Aaronson had literary ambitions from an early age, and by 1914 he contributed his first work for the radical literary magazine The New Age. He was often published under the name L. Aaronson. In the 1920s, he converted to Christianity. His first collection of poems, Christ in the Synagogue, published by V. Gollancz in 1930, dealt to a large extent with his conversion and spiritual identity as both a Jew and an Englishman. This subject would become a recurring theme in his numerous mystical poems. Christ in the Synagogue reached only a small audience and received fewer than a dozen reviews, but The Manchester Guardian, The Nation and Athenaeum, The Times Literary Supplement, and The New Age wrote favourably of it.

Notwithstanding Aaronson's small readership, V. Gollancz published a second verse collection in 1933, titled Poems. Despite being little known to the general public, Aaronson gained a cult following of dedicated readers. His third collection, The Homeward Journey and Other Poems, was published in 1946 by Christophers, a small London publisher. Some of his works also appeared in journals and anthologies such as the 1953 Faber Book of Twentieth Century Verse.

"There are two elements in Aaronson's poetry, the lyrical, which is of course an expected one-all poetry; even the most severe seems to have had its roots in the impulse of song – and the other impulse is the dramatic one. These two are wedded well enough for the most part, though many of his poems seem to be concerned with the capturing – at any price – of the mood or feeling of a place, and he is often capable of sacrificing theme or idea or passion even, for the sake of mood. In fact this desire to capture precisely a landscape comes across as an anxiety for root[s] somewhere, and it is at bottom, I think, a result of the conflict which is: Shall I or shall I not be a Jew?"

— Jon Silkin

Since Aaronson's poetry does not display formal innovation, literature professor William Baker, characterises him as "A post-Georgian rather than a modernist [poet]". Baker further notes that Aaronson's poetry deals with several issues of his time, such as the rise of fascism and the Second World War, but points out that Aaronson did not directly write about the Holocaust. Upon Aaronson's death, the poet Arthur Chaim Jacobs compared him with Isaac Rosenberg, the more celebrated poet of the same Anglo-Jewish generation. According to Jacobs, Aaronson was "clearly influenced by him in terms of diction, and in a kind of verbal energy which runs through a lot of his poetry. But he was less radical than Rosenberg in his use of language, and tended towards Keatsian luxuriance and sweetness." The poet Jon Silkin also unfavourably compared Aaronson to Rosenberg, writing "it cannot be said that his work attains to either the burning majesty or the depth of Rosenberg's poetry, and this is explicable perhaps by the fact that Aaronson does not altogether care to acknowledge his roots."

Although much of Aaronson's writings centred on his conversion to Christianity, Jacobs traces a continuing Hebraic mood in his poetry, and wrote that "his Christianity was hardly familiarly Anglican, and there is in his work an avowed sensuality which could in some ways be compared to that of modern Hebrew poets like Tchernikowsky or Shneur, or later, Avraham Shlonsky." According to his friend Joseph Leftwich, Aronson himself in old age acknowledged influences from both traditional Judaism and Martin Buber's unorthodox interpretation of Hasidism.

Aaronson's poetry was not widely publicised, and he left over a thousand unpublished poems at his death. Little scholarly attention has been paid to his life and poetry. Upon Aaronson's death Jacobs stated that "Further assessment of his work awaits more substantial publication"; about 40 years later, Baker, who has written most extensively on Aaronson, named him among the Whitechapel intellectual writers and artists "today consigned to oblivion".

== Bibliography ==
- Christ in the Synagogue. London: V. Gollancz, 1930
- Poems. London: V. Gollancz, 1933
- The Homeward Journey and Other Poems. London: Christophers, 1946
