= Grete von Urbanitzky =

Austrian novelist and journalist

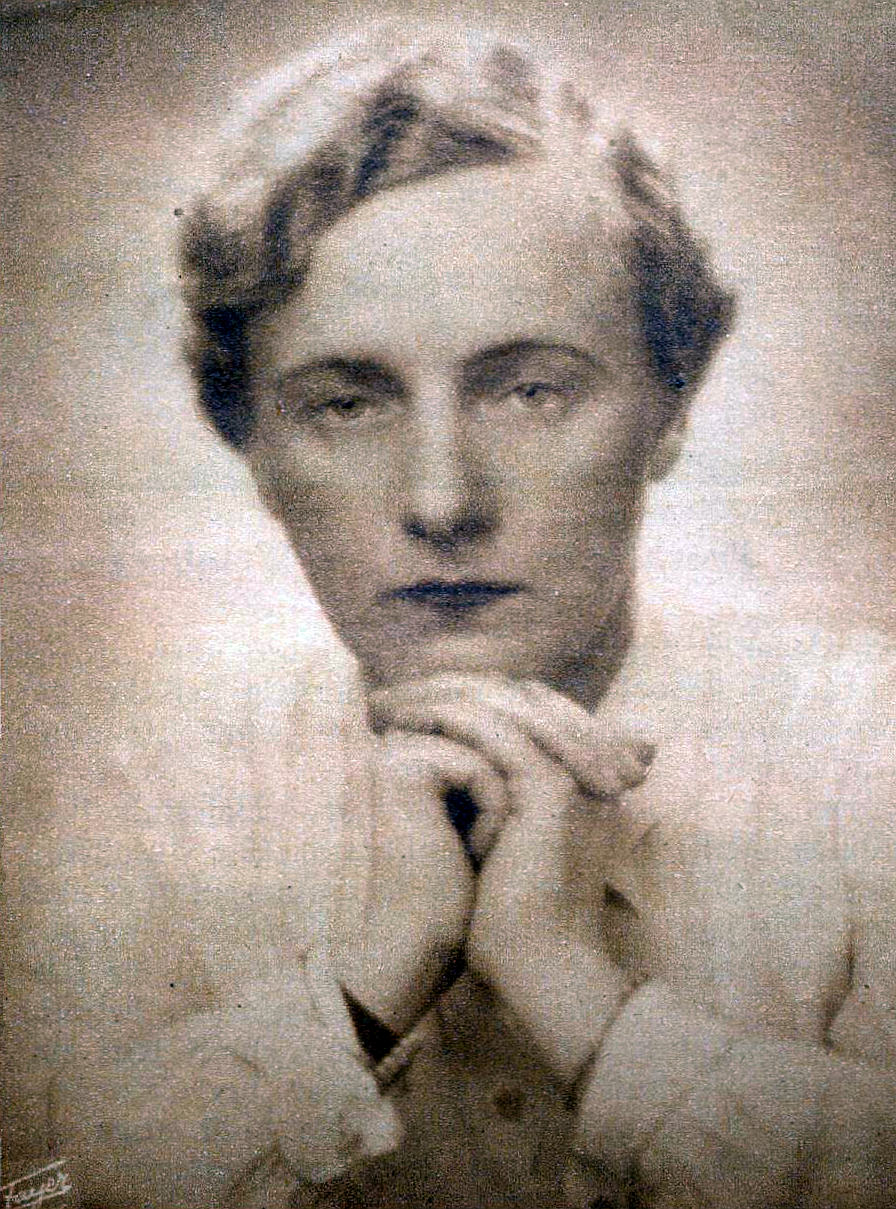
- von Urbanitzky, c. 1930
- Born: 9 July 1891; Linz, Upper Austria, Austro-Hungarian empire
- Died: 4 November 1974 (aged 83); Geneva, Switzerland
- Occupations: Author-novelist; Journalist; Translator
- Spouse(s): 1. Ludwig Woluszuk; 2. Peter Johann Franz Passini (1898–1978)
- Partner: Maria "Mia" Passini (1903–)
- Children: no
- Parent(s): Rudolf Franz Josef Urbanitzky (1855–1942); Cäcilia Grünwald (1861–1931)

Grete von Urbanitzky (9 July 1891 – 4 November 1974) was an Austrian-born novelist, journalist and translator. A prolific writer of "entertainment novels", a label that has contributed to her neglect by scholars of "serious" literature, she explored the position of women, especially artists, in society and the public sphere. Prominent themes included female homosexuality set against the sexual ethics of mainstream, middle-class society.

== Life ==
=== Background and education ===
Grete von Urbanitzky was born in Linz (a regional capital between Salzburg and Vienna), the first of five daughters. Her parents, from further east in Austria-Hungary (father: Transylvania; mother: Cisalpine Banat), spoke German. (Note: See Volksdeutsche.) Her father's birthplace, Sibiu, and her mother's, Arad, became part of Romania under the 1920 Treaty of Trianon.

Close to her father (a bond echoed in her positive literary portrayals of patriarchal authority), she was also shaped by pan-German nationalism, then eroding the Empire's monarchically sustained Austro-Slavism. In World War I sketch stories she stressed her "Germanness" (though in the 1960s she highlighted her French grandmothers, perhaps to distance herself from earlier nationalist ties).

She attended the pioneering Körnerschule Lyzeum, a secondary school for girls in Linz, and a gymnasium in Zürich, gaining an unusually solid academic grounding for a girl of her time. She then attended University of Zürich lectures, particularly enjoying those in the natural sciences and philosophy. After her first literary successes, she left her studies and in 1909 moved to Vienna.

=== Marriages and partnership ===
In Vienna, Grete von Urbanitzky married twice (first Ludwig Woluszuk, then Peter Johann Franz Passini). Both marriages ended quickly in divorce, the first at her father's insistence over debts. More significant was her informal literary partnership and lasting friendship with her second husband's younger sister, Maria "Mia" Passini. They lived together from 1934 and remained close until Mia married an Englishman in 1945.

=== Pre-war publications ===
Urbanitzky's first publication, Sehnsucht (Yearning, 1911) compiled youthful writings exploring a romanticised view of the artist, a recurring theme in her work.

Her more substantial and structured Wenn die Weiber Menschen werden ... Gedanken einer Einsamen (If Women Became People ... Thoughts of a Woman Alone, published 1913), drew on what she called the "gender dichotomy" from Otto Weininger's Geschlecht und Charakter (Sex and Character). She proposed a third archetype alongside Weininger's "whore" and "mother": the woman-as-artist, condemned to forgo love and motherhood. Commentators see this as her attempt to claim a respectable role within conservative haute bourgeois milieux (like Vienna's).

=== World War I and aftermath ===
Amid World War I and its aftermath, Urbanitzky wrote for nationalist-leaning newspapers and magazines (e.g., Neue Grazer Tagblatt, Alpenland, Die Saat, Die Deutsche Nation, Großdeutschland, Vierburgenland), making arguments described as populist-nationalist and racist, and dedicating her work to "deutsches Volkstum und die Rasse der Erdlinge" ("German folkdom and the race of earthlings"). She said that pan-Germanism, including a German Austria or Anschluss, was necessary to preserve sociocultural values and maintain political order.

She also wrote on economics and finance, contributing regularly to economic journals in 1917, and now-forgotten poems, song lyrics, and operetta libretti, while working in cabaret.

During this period, Urbanitzky was closely aligned with the populist-nationalist mindset through her cultural-political activity. She organised readings for the Deutscher Schulverein, an organisation dedicated to preserving the German language in parts of Europe where its hegemony was increasingly challenged by alternative nationalisms and resurgent regional languages. She contributed a major piece, a call to arms for the nation's poets, to Arthur Trebitsch's anthology Deutscher Geist aus Österreich (German Spirit from Austria, 1920).

In 1920 she published her novel Das andere Blut (The Other Blood), followed by Die Auswanderer (The Emigrants, 1921) and Die goldene Peitsche (The Golden Whip, 1922). These works mark her most vehemently populist phase. Commentators regard the books as openly racist and antisemitic, forcefully emphasising the "biological" ideology fundamental to German nationalism at the time.

=== Red Vienna ===
After the headline grabbing aggression of her three novels between 1920 and 1922, such populist-nationalist outpourings were less openly to the fore in her published work. In 1923 she teamed up with other younger leading lights of the Vienna literary establishment, including the writers Arthur Schnitzler, Raoul Auernheimer and Siegfried Trebitsch, along with the publisher Ernst Peter Tal, to set up the Austrian section of the recently established PEN International authors' association. She herself accepted appointment as "General Secretary" of the Austria branch.

In 1924, Karl Kraus mocked Urbanitzky in Die Fackel as a "kulturellen Verbindungsdienst zwischen der Reichspost und der Neue Freie Presse" ("cultural liaison between the German Reich postal service and the New Free Press," Austria's bourgeois liberal newspaper of record), or a pan-German nationalist voice aligned with the mainstream. His jab reflected her prominent, politically ambiguous position in the cultural life of the First Austrian Republic.

During this possibly more liberal phase she published her novel "Der wilde Garten" in 1927. The book focuses on the contentious theme of lesbian love, something of which Urbanitzky by now had significant personal experience. It formed the basis for the reputation that she subsequently enjoyed (or, depending on the circumstances, not) in that it established her as a novelist willing to deal with "slippery" sexual themes that others preferred not to address. There was no express distancing from the populist-nationalism and antisemitism of her previous novels, however. The novel "Mirjams Sohn" (1926) is often portrayed as philosemitic, in that it takes a theme from Jewish history as its starting point. The book is, in reality, sufficiently nuanced to provide for a range of conflicting interpretations. It deals with the appearance of a "leader" figure in the Amsterdam ghetto during the seventeenth century, but it nevertheless employs an anti-messianic plot structure - the murder of a messiah figure by Jews - and includes glimpses of antisemitic and indeed misogynistic ideologies.

Urbanitzky was most productive in the 1920s, when many of her 32 (by 1943) novels were published in often rapid succession, with high print-runs. She combined her writing with a job as press officer for the Vienna Volksoper, at the same time running her own literary agency. She was also publishing the magazine "Roman der Millionen" (loosely, "Novel for the millions") which was intended to produce a first German-language translation of a fresh novel each month. Unfortunately the magazine ceased production after the appearance of just four editions, probably for financial reasons. Between 1925 and 1928 she worked as a contributing editor with the liberal-left daily newspaper, Der Tag. She was also working for the aggressively anti-Marxist Neues Wiener Journal. Her private circle reflected a growing political ambivalence. She was in regular contact with high-profile members of the populist-nationalist faction, such as Arthur Trebitsch and Robert Hohlbaum, but her friends also included liberal authors - both Jewish and non-Jewish - such as Richard Specht, Herwarth Walden, Nelly Sachs, Gertrud Isolani and Felix Salten.

As the 1920s drew to a close Austria was badly impacted by the backwash from the Wall Street Crash. A return to widespread acute economic hardship was accompanied by a retreat from moderation on the political front. With politics in both Austria and Germany ever more polarised, Grete von Urbanitzky managed to sustain a strange level of political ambivalence in her novels. In 1931 and 1933 "Eine Frau erlebt die Welt" ("A Woman experiences the World") and "Karin und die Welt der Männer" ("Karin and the World of Men") were both highly successful in commercial terms. In stark contrast to the novels she was producing ten years earlier, neither can be unambiguously defined politically. Certainly both of them include clearly National Socialist position statements and both are sometimes seen as "confessional books", but they both entirely lack the strident racism that was characteristic of Austrian (and German) National Socialism at the time, and when it comes to plot development it is striking that, notably in the second of the two, fascist ideology is uncompromisingly subverted.

=== National Socialism ===
Although Austria was only integrated into Germany in 1938, the country underwent savage political ructions of its own several years earlier, and acquired its own National Socialist post-democratic one-party dictatorship in 1933. If her novels were politically ambivalent, when it came to her own life choices and events, von Urbanitzky evidently retained her "nationalist" beliefs. During 1933 she attended a PEN International congress at Dubrovnik when a motion to condemn Nazi book burnings was discussed. The German delegation walked out in protest during the discussion. Grete von Urbanitzky, who was attending as a representative (and the General Secretary) of the Austrian section, promptly left the conference hall in sympathy with the German group. When she returned to Vienna the Austrian section of the PEN International association broke apart, and von Urbanitzky faced widespread media criticism for the position she had taken in Dubrovnik. She also faced personal risks in Vienna on account of her open commitment to the German National Socialists. Fearing arrest if she remained any longer in Austria, in 1933 she relocated to Berlin. Once in Berlin she published a series of newspaper articles and gave a number of radio interviews, in which she called for a boycott of Austrian-Jewish authors and of other "liberal" Austrian authors. This seems to have contributed to extending significantly the German government's schedule of authors whose works were banned from publication in Germany, which traditionally had been an important market for Austrian authors.

Although reader demand meant that frequent reprints of "Karin und die Welt der Männer" continued, its author soon fell out of favour with the authorities in Germany, just as she had in Austria. In 1934, together with her friend Mia Passini, she was arrested by the security services. They were soon released, but that was very far from being the end of the matter. Shortly afterwards one of her novels were determined to be philosemitic. In Prussia, early in 1935, copies of "Mirjams Sohn" (1926) were confiscated and locked away, having been deemed a danger to public safety and order. (Note: "...Gefährdung der öffenlichen Sicherheit oder Ordnung".) Later her lesbian novel, "Der wilde Garten", was placed on the "List of damaging and undesirable literature" produced for the first time towards the end of 1935 by the Public Enlightenment and Propaganda Ministry. The next year copies of two more of her books, "Eine Frau erlebt die Welt..." (1932) and "Ursula und der Kapitän" (1934) were removed from workplace libraries under an order issued by the "Reichsarbeitsgemeinschaft Deutscher Werkbüchereien". These measures were part of a broader government move to "clean up the literature sector". (Note: "... Säuberungswelle auf dem Schrifttumssektor".)

On 16 January 1936 the security services received an anonymous notification of rumours concerning the allegedly Jewish provenance of von Urbanitzky's mother (who had died only in 1931). This development came in the context of newly enacted laws effectively requiring all citizens to research their genealogical provenance sufficiently to be able to demonstrate that none of their four grandparents had been Jewish, or alternatively to demonstrate the extent to which they descended from Jewish or Roma grandparents. The extent of Jewishness that the rumours imputed to von Urbanitzky's grandmother was not, in 1936, sufficient to require "indexation", but as a high-profile novelist her racial background was nevertheless of above average interest to the authorities. Sources indicate that race-based rumours about her mother's provenance will possibly or probably have contributed to the decision that Grete von Urbanitzky and Mia Passini took to emigrate. During 1936 they relocated together to Paris.

Meanwhile, back in Germany her 1932 "Durch Himmel und Hölle" ("Through Heaven and Hell") was included on an updated version of the government's "List of damaging and undesirable literature" in 1937 on account of its allegedly pornographic content. In January 1939 von Urbanitzky was expelled from the Reich Chamber of Literature, membership of which was normally needed in order to pursue a career as a published author in Hitler's Germany. It was nevertheless only in 1941 that her work was subject to a blanket ban in Germany, by means of inclusion on a newly extended government "List of damaging and undesirable literature". The immediate trigger for the ban was almost certainly her 1941 novel "Miliza", in which the German authorities had detected "pacifist tendencies" when it had been published (in Switzerland). By this time her Vienna-based publisher, Zsolnay Verlag, had advised her, in 1940, that he no longer wished to publish her books in what had been, since 1938, part of Germany.

=== Paris ===
In Paris von Urbanitzky wrote and in 1938 published the novel which she regarded as her most important "Unsere Liebe Frau von Paris" (loosely, "Our Lady of Paris"), along with a number of resolutely non-political "entertainment novels" that she managed to have published by Zsolnay Verlag in Vienna. (Zsolnay was her principal publisher between 1935 and 1940.)

=== Swiss exile ===
It is unclear how long von Urbanitzky remained in Paris. By the time war broke out in 1939 or 1940 Grete von Urbanitzky and Mia Passini had moved to Switzerland where they settled together in Ticino. Switzerland was welcoming large numbers of political and race-based refugees from Nazi Germany: the quality of the welcome was variable. Sources nevertheless note that von Urbanitzky and Passini received permanent residence permits and work permits quickly and without difficulty (though for a successful novelist whose principal intended target market remained Germany - including what before 1938 had been Austria - it is hard to see that the need for a Swiss work permit would have been pressing). Von Urbanitzky had already been able to negotiate a publishing agreement with Morgarten Verlag, a publishing house based not in Morgarten (Zug), but in Zürich. She continued to try and find a publisher in Germany, a far larger book market, and one in which she had acquired a large and evidently faithful readership over the space of two decades. She entered into negotiations with "Kaiser Verlag" in Böhmisch-Leipa, which had found itself inside Germany (with the express agreement of governments in England and France) since 1938. Kaiser, it seemed, had no problem with negotiating a publishing agreement for Germany, but in the end the discussions nevertheless came to nothing.

The friends made their home in Lugano. Compared to other exiled writer, von Urbanitzky was in some ways in a position of privilege. She was able to write undisturbed, and publish her novels in Switzerland where she was able to earn a sufficient income from them. On the other hand, she was ostracised by others in the community of exiled authors who had made their home in Switzerland. Memories of her contribution at the 1933 PEN International in Dubrovnik remained sharp. Later the women left Lugano, moving across to Ascona on the shores of Lake Maggiore, across the mountains to the north-west.

In her written work, she responded to her 1939 ejection from the "Reichsschrifttumskammer" by producing what seemed to her to be consciously non-political novels such as "Es begann im September" (1940) and "Miliza" (1941), both of which were published in Switzerland by Scherz Verlag. The novels dealt with themes such as francophilia and European internationalism. There was a strong anti-war strand. In this way she finally distanced herself unambiguously from the populist-nationalist position to which she had previously, demonstrating a chameleon-like propensity for adapting her ideological convictions to her surroundings. After 1942, when it became clear that any return to Germany in the foreseeable future was out of the question, von Urbanitzky distanced herself from any form of totalitarian rule in "Der große Traum" (1942, "The Big Dream") and "Der Mann Alexander" (1943). After the end of the war, when Mia Passini went off to London to marry Henry Crowe in 1946, she remained in Switzerland, only now "discovering" the truly multi-national nature of her mother's genealogy.

From now on she completely ignored her own earlier National Socialist involvement, using the German government's 1941 blanket ban on her works to present herself as having been persecuted and victimized by the Nazis. Having been persuaded to flee the country in 1936 on account of intensified attention from the security services, following rumours of her own insufficiently Aryan genealogy, might indeed have been seen as tantamount to being forced to leave, especially in view of the Shoah implemented by the German government after 1941. From Switzerland she reinstated her literary agency, which provided an apparently modest income. She also worked in Geneva as a correspondent at the United Nations Office there. She found that it was no longer popular to build further on her former success as a novelist. New editions in 1948 and 1949 of "Der Mann Alexander" and "Es begann im September" met with only limited success. Even if von Urbanitzky had set aside her enthusiastic support for the Hitler government back in 1933, others had not. During 1948 she negotiated a promising publishing agreement with Desch Verlag in Munich, but in October of that year the publisher pulled out at the last minute, responding to objections over the deal received from the journalist-author (and committed anti-Nazi) Elisabeth Castonier.

In 1965, slightly implausibly, von Urbanitzky received and accepted a request from Bruno Kreisky - at that time serving as the Austrian Foreign Minister - that she should write a book about Austria from the perspective of an Austrian émigré. One cynical commentator suggests that von Urbanitzky's own well documented attitude towards "official" Austria had set her up for this unconventional commission. Shortly after agreement was reached Kreisky lost his ministerial position as a result of the 1966 general election, and the new government evidently felt itself under no obligation to pursue the matter. The book was nevertheless written, and the manuscript was found among von Urbanitzky's papers after she died.

During the final part of her life Grete von Urbanitzky seems to have been based in Geneva. By the time that she died there, on 4 November 1974, she was alone, suffering from alcoholism, and almost completely blind.

== Literary estate ==
The Wienbibliothek im Rathaus (literally, "Vienna Library in the City Hall") accommodates fifteen boxes containing Grete von Urbanitzky's manuscripts. (There is also what sources describe as a "musical fragment").

== Output (selection) ==
- Hassgesang gegen Italien, Worte von G. v. Urbanitzky, A. R. Bleibtreu. Vertonung Artur Löwenstein, Krenn, Wien 1915.
- Das andere Blut, Roman, R. Wunderlich, Leipzig 1920.
- Der verflogene Vogel, Gedichte, Wiener Literarische Anstalt, Wien 1920.
- Die Auswanderer, Roman, Wiener Literarische Anstalt, Wien 1921.
- Die goldene Peitsche, Roman, Hermann Haessel, Leipzig 1922. (online courtesy of ALO).
- Masken der Liebe, Novellen, Haessel, Leipzig 1922.
- Maria Alborg, Roman, Haessel, Leipzig 1923.
- Mirjams Sohn, Roman, Engelhorn, Stuttgart 1926.
- Der wilde Garten, Roman, Hesse und Becker, Leipzig 1927. (online courtesy of ALO).
- Eine Frau erlebt die Welt, Roman, Zsolnay, Berlin-Wien-Leipzig 1934.
- Heimkehr zur Liebe, Roman, Zsolnay, Berlin 1935.
- Nina, Roman, Zsolnay, Berlin 1935.
- Karin und die Welt der Männer, Roman, Zsolnay, Berlin 1937.
- Es begann im September ..., Roman, Scherz Verlag, Bern 1940.
- Begegnung in Alassio, Roman, Neues Österreich, Wien 1951.

Her translation work into German drew on English, French and Italian authors. It included several works of Claude Anet.
