= Young Socialist League =

- Founded: 1911
- Dissolved: March, 1921
- Succeeded by: The Young Workers' League
- Newspaper: Red Flag
- Ideology: Communism; Socialism
- Political position: Left-wing

The Young Socialist League was a British radical political youth group founded in 1911. The group was mostly active in London, where it also had the majority of its members. According to the Encyclopedia of British and Irish Political Organizations, the group probably had its roots in the Socialist Sunday Schools. The League was linked to the British Socialist Party, a small Marxist party, also founded in 1911, who were supporters of the Bolshevik Revolution. It published a paper called the Red Flag.

In March 1921 the Young Socialist League merged with a section of the Young Labour League to form the Young Workers' League, a forerunner of the Young Communist League.

== Members ==
Several of the so-called Whitechapel Boys, including John Rodker, Isaac Rosenberg, Joseph Leftwich, Samuel Winsten, Lazarus Aaronson and David Bomberg were among the members of the League.
