= Winsten =

Winsten is a surname. Notable people with the surname include:

- Archer Winsten (1904–1997), American film critic
- Beth Tanenhaus Winsten, American filmmaker, screenwriter, and visual artist
- Clare Winsten, married name of Clara Birnberg (1892 or 1894 – 1989), British artist, wife of Stephen Winsten
- Jay Winsten, American academic
- Stephen Winsten (1893–1991), British writer

== See also ==
- Winston (name)
