= Rodker =

Rodker is a surname. It may refer to:

- Joan Rodker (1915–2010), English political activist and television producer
- John Rodker (1894–1955), English writer, modernist poet, and publisher of modernist writers
- Mary Rodker, marriage name of Mary Butts (1890–1937), English modernist writer
