= Jitta's Atonement =

1923 Austrian play

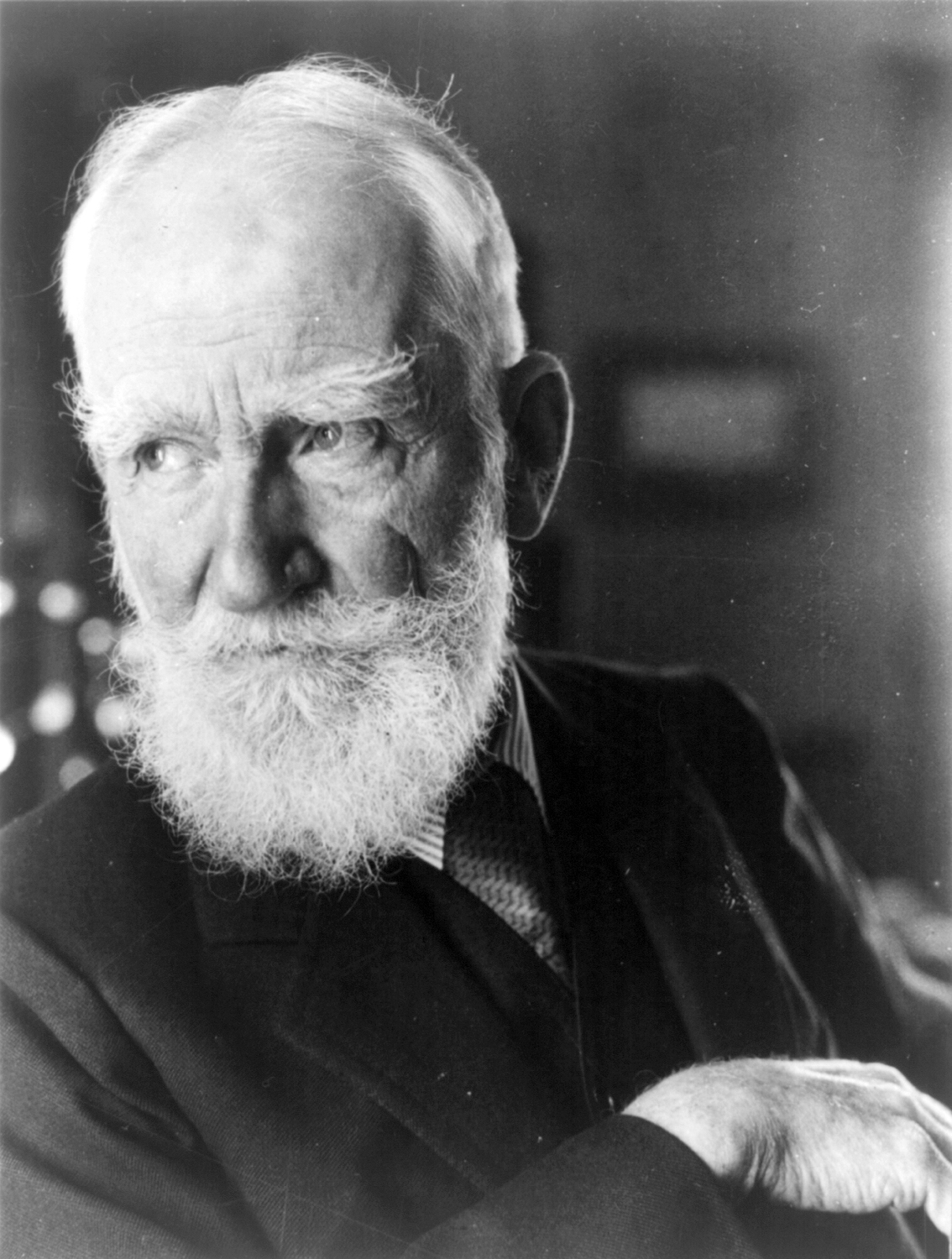
- Written by: George Bernard Shaw; Siegfried Trebitsch
- Original language: English
- Subject: a woman must atone for her extramarital affair
- Genre: tragi-comedy
- Setting: Vienna

Premiere
- Date premiered: 1923
- Place premiered: Broadway

Jitta's Atonement (1923) is an adaptation by George Bernard Shaw of the play Frau Gitta's Sühne by Siegfried Trebitsch. It is about a woman who has to atone to her husband for having an affair with his best friend. The atonement of both Jitta and other characters take unexpected forms. Shaw dramatically rewrote the last part of the play, giving it a more characteristically Shavian tone.

== Creation ==
The Austrian playwright Siegfried Trebitsch was Shaw's translator for German language productions of his works. Shaw believed that Trebitsch had helped to launch his career in Central Europe, which had provided Shaw with a solid income before he was successful in Britain. Shaw offered to translate his play Frau Gitta's Sühne, which was originally an Ibsenesque tragedy. Shaw made a number of significant changes, especially in the last act, which turned it into a tragi-comedy with a more positive ending. Shaw insisted that his changes "affect, not the story itself, but only the key in which it ends". Critic Bernard Dukore says that "The claim is disingenuous. Shaw's 'variations' pervade and alter the entire play."

== Characters ==
- Dr. Ernest Fessler
- Professor Alfred Lenkheim
- Mrs. Billiter
- Professor Bruno Haldenstedt
- Edith
- Jitta Lenkheim
- Agnes Haldenstedt

== Plot ==
The main character Jitta Lenkheim is married to a university professor. She has been having an affair with Bruno, a psychologist who is friend and colleague of her husband. She has become alienated from her husband because he has abandoned his ideals to pursue his career. She meets her lover in a sleazy bordello, where he dies of a heart attack. She flees in embarrassment to avoid scandal. Before he died, Bruno, aware of his ill health, had asked her to have his unpublished book published under her husband's name. He hopes that by giving him his book he can atone for taking his wife.

When the truth comes out everyone is affected. Bruno's wife and daughter are devastated. Jitta's husband, Alfred Lenkheim, is at first appalled by the idea that he should take someone else's research and publish it as his own, and remains angry about his wife's infidelity. However, he finally demonstrates that he epitomises the very noble ideals to which she aspires. He agrees to edit the book and to get it published, even though he is not convinced that it is as brilliant as its author thought. No longer the bombastic conformist he appeared to be, he accepts that he must do what is right to allow his wife and Bruno to atone for their betrayal. In the end he confesses that he too has had an affair — with a friend of Jitta's.

== Shaw's changes ==
According to Dukore, Shaw changes the last scene significantly, but he also "alters and embroiders every scene, every page, virtually every line". He changed the spelling Gitta's name to emphasise that it should not be pronounced with a hard G. He also changes the husband's name from Alphons to Alfred, possibly because Alphons sounds slightly too comic in English. Shaw repeatedly undercuts the romantic fervour of the original in which Gitta is left at the end to brood on her guilt. In Shaw's version, Alfred assures Jitta that her guilt is a form of self-indulgence: "How you enjoy being miserable, Jitta.... You think yourself such a jolly romantic figure... yet you are ashamed of yourself because you were not found stretched on his dead body, with the limelight streaming on your white face, and the band playing slow music." For Dukore, this undercutting of moral posturing allows the characters to genuinely interact in a way that is absent in the original play. The characters "begin to understand themselves and each other, try to come to terms, make an effort to arrive at a decision and to act upon new knowledge". Shaw also alters the sub-plot about the unpublished book. In Trebitsch's version, Alphons wishes to destroy the book, which is presented as a radical masterpiece, but Gitta forces him to accept it. In Shaw's version he is not convinced that it's a masterpiece at all, and thinks no-one would ever believe he wrote it.

== Productions ==
The play was first produced on Broadway in New York in 1923, starring Bertha Kalich as Jitta. It has been revived sporadically. In 1996 there was a production starring Elizabeth Franz playing the mother and Calista Flockhart as her daughter.
