= Adolphe 1920 =

Adolphe 1920 is a novella written by John Rodker and published in 1929. Set in Paris, it spans eight hours in the life of its protagonist, Dick.

It is similar in many respects to James Joyce's Ulysses and Virginia Woolf's Mrs. Dalloway in its use of stream-of-consciousness narration and the limiting of the action to just one day. In this sense it is very much a modernist text.

Dick is a manic narrator, and reminiscent of Septimus Smith, the shell-shocked war veteran of Woolf's Mrs.Dalloway. There are several references to the after effects of the First World War, and the novella's fractured nature could be seen as a metaphor for fractured post-war Europe.

== Plot summary ==
The novella is split into eight sections - each spanning roughly an hour. The narrative is fragmented, often making it difficult to tell who is talking or thinking, or whether events are occurring in the present or being recalled.

=== Section I ===
Dick awakes to find a fair being set up in the street outside. He recalls a visit he took to Bordeaux with his ex-lover Angela. They visited a crypt. He watches a film of a Victorian woman undressing in a mutoscope.

=== Section II ===
He returns to the crowd in the street and becomes nauseous as he is swept up by the mass of people. He meets the Snake-lady and propositions her - she accepts. He becomes lost in the crowd again, then is found by Monica, who is possibly his current girlfriend.

=== Section III ===
They enter a tent with waxwork displays of body parts, and disfigured people with what appear to be war-wounds. Dick picks up a dwarf. He and Monica kiss. He flees and watches another mutoscope film of a head biting a neck. He expresses a desire to rest.

=== Section IV ===
He returns to his bedroom and dreams of Angela. He wakes as Monica enters. He gazes at her, they kiss, then he takes her outside back into the crowd and slips away from her.

=== Section V ===
He leaves the crowd. He becomes confused and begins to daydream about Angela and his regret for love.

=== Section VI ===
He re-enters the fair and sees five wrestlers: a bear, a fat wrestler, a thin wrestler, a large woman, and a "flour-white-faced boy". They fight and the woman wins. Dick is disgusted by this. He then sees the ghost of Angela in the crowd, and has another daydream in a tent. He watches a projected film in which a face gets larger and larger on the screen.

=== Section VII ===
He collects Monica from his room and they go to a restaurant and then an aquarium. He has a vision of Angela as Undine.

=== Section VIII ===
Angela returns and Monica is forced to leave. Monica returns with an unnamed escort. They pick up the Snake-lady from the fair and all five go to a club. In the club Dick specifically notes the jazz musicians, black waiters, dancers, and a singer. An unidentified black man sits with them and plays with the snake. Dick talks with Angela in an anteroom. He starts to stack glasses on one another: they topple over after Angela tells him to stop. Dick becomes delirious and returns home in a taxi. He goes to sleep.

== Praise and criticism ==
Ezra Pound, writing for The Dial in November 1928, believed the novel to be one of only two "offspring from Ulysses...possessing any value."
