= Highway to Battle =

1961 British film by Ernest Morris

- British theatrical poster
- Directed by: Ernest Morris
- Written by: Brian Clemens; Eldon Howard; Joseph Pole (story)
- Produced by: Edward J. Danziger; Harry Lee Danziger
- Starring: Gerard Heinz; Margaret Tyzack; Ferdy Mayne; Vincent Ball
- Cinematography: Stephen Dade
- Edited by: Spencer Reeve
- Music by: Bill LeSage
- Production company: Danziger Productions
- Distributed by: Paramount British Pictures (UK)
- Release date: May 1961 (UK)
- Running time: 71 minutes
- Country: United Kingdom
- Language: English

Highway to Battle is a 1961 British second feature ('B') thriller film directed by Ernest Morris and starring Gerard Heinz and Margaret Tyzack. It was written by Brian Clemens and Eldon Howard and produced by The Danzigers.

== Plot ==
Before the Second World War, a Nazi party member starts to have misgivings about the Nazis' plans. He attempts to defect to England, but is chased by the Gestapo.

== Cast ==
- Gerard Heinz as Constantin
- Margaret Tyzack as Hilda
- Ferdy Mayne as Zeigler
- Dawn Beret as Gerda
- Peter Reynolds as Jarvost
- Vincent Ball as Ransome
- George Mikell as Brauwitz
- John Gabriel as Carl
- Robert Bruce as editor
- Robert Crewdson as Newmens
- Hugh Cross as official
- Jill Hyem as stewardess
- Cavan Malone as Hoffman
- Bernadette Milnes as bar girl
- Richard Shaw as Franz

== Critical reception ==
The Monthly Film Bulletin wrote: "A minor contribution to the current resurgence of films about the Nazi horror. But the plot, though completely superficial, is trimly tailored and does suggest a little of the pressure under which Germans of conscience laboured in the pre-war period. The climax, with Brauwitz's suicide and Gerda's volte-face, is hardly convincing. But Gerard Heinz and Margaret Tyzack do their best by the sketchily-written roles of Constantin and his wife. Nazi thuggery is kept down to a minimum and the direction has one or two telling moments."
