= Whitechapel Boys =

Group of writers and artists

The Whitechapel Boys were a group of Anglo-Jewish writers and artists who were active in the early 20th century and are credited with founding British Modernism. The group was named after Whitechapel, an area in the East End of London which was home to one of London's main Jewish settlements. The name "Whitechapel Boys" originated later in the 20th century, being retrospectively coined by Joseph Leftwich, one of the group's members. Other notable members included Jacob Epstein, Mark Gertler, Isaac Rosenberg, David Bomberg, Jacob Kramer, Morris Goldstein, Stephen Winsten (also known as Simy Weinstein), John Rodker, and the only woman associated with the group, Clara Birnberg. The group overlapped with other early 20th-century artistic circles in London, such as the Bloomsbury Group.

== History ==
=== Members ===
As members of the Jewish Diaspora, some were born in England to immigrant parents while others were born in Central or Eastern Europe and fled the pogroms as children. The Whitechapel Boys were never an established art movement with common objectives. They were united by their economic situations, Jewish backgrounds, and determinations to succeed in their respective art forms.

The four most well-known members were Rosenberg, Bomberg, Gertler, and Rodker. Isaac Rosenberg (1890–1918) was a poet who was killed in World War I. His parents were Jewish immigrants from Russia. Rosenberg attended school briefly before becoming an engraver's apprentice at 14, spending his free time painting. His talent led him to be granted funds to attend the Slade Art School. David Bomberg (1890–1957) was a painter who also attended the Slade Art School. He turned down an apprenticeship as a lithographer to commit to painting, studying under Sickert. Mark Gertler (1891–1939) was a painter who attended the Slade Art School. He was born to poor Polish-Jewish parents and spoke only Yiddish until age 8. Gertler's style was influenced by Post-Impressionism and Eastern European folk art. John Rodker (1894–1955) was a writer and publisher. He attended boarding school and, at the age of 14, the Jews' Free School. Avoiding military conscription, he became editor of The Little Review in 1919. He went on to set up the Ovid Press and continued publishing and translating.

=== Politics and War ===
Several of the Whitechapel Boys, such as Rodker, Rosenberg, Leftwich, Winsten and Bomberg, were politically active and members of the radical Young Socialist League. When World War I began, many members opposed the fighting. Winsten, a self-described pacifist, joined the No-Conscription Fellowship, as did Gertler and Rodker. Winsten and Birnberg spent much of 1914–1916 campaigning against conscription. Goldstein was unable to enlist as he had not been naturalised, so he took up a teaching post as Art Master at nearby Toynbee Arts Club instead. Gertler was rejected from service because his parents were Austrian and fled to Garsington in Oxfordshire, where he continued working under the support of Lady Ottoline Morrell. Bomberg shot himself in the foot while serving on the Front in Flanders, temporarily invalidating himself. Other group members volunteered or were called to serve as the war continued, scattering the Whitechapel Boys permanently. Rosenberg was killed in the war, while Bomberg and Gertler were impacted by their wartime experiences in ways that left them struggling to survive as painters in the British art scene. Rodker was eventually declared bankrupt.

=== Artwork ===
As a group, the artists would meet at the Whitechapel Art Gallery and the Whitechapel Library to discuss art, literature, and politics. Their discussions and works contributed to the development of British Modernism. Their works were frequently exhibited at the Whitechapel Gallery. Notably, they exhibited together in the dedicated Jewish Section of the exhibition 'Twentieth Century Art: a Review of Modern Movements in 1914.'

Many pieces made by group members were influenced by World War I. The Merry-Go-Round (1916) by Gertler depicts screaming figures on a carousel and is widely regarded as a satirical piece about militarism. Bomberg's Procession (1912–1914) appears to depict conscripts marching towards their deaths. Rosenberg's Self-Portrait in Steel Helmet (1916) shows the artist in uniform. Rosenberg also used his poems to describe the war experience. In 'Dead Man's Dump,' one of his best-known poems, he details his experience of taking barbed wire and metal stakes to repair barriers in no-man's land throughout the night.
