= Gerard Heinz =

German actor (1904–1972)

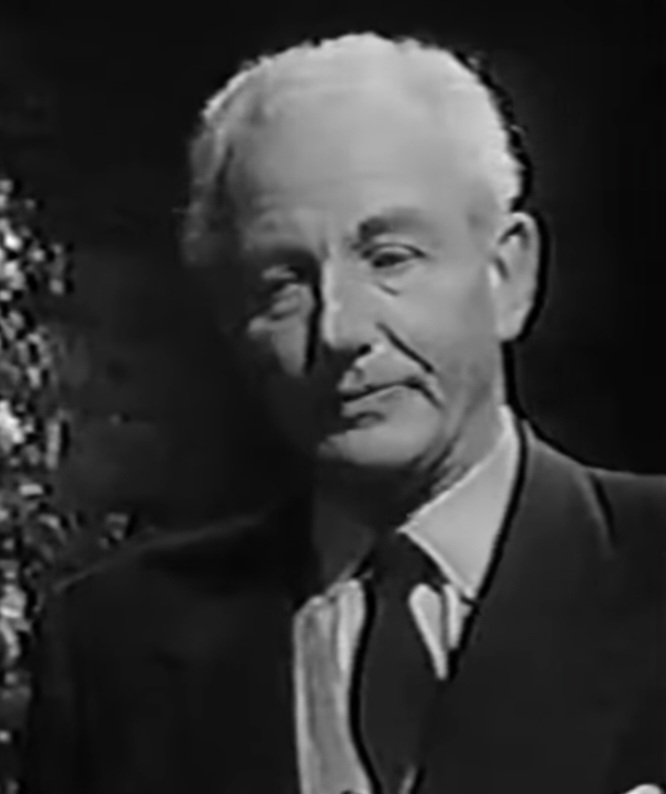
- Heinz in an episode of One Step Beyond (1961)
- Born: 2 January 1904; Hamburg, German Empire
- Died: 20 November 1972 (aged 68); London, United Kingdom
- Occupation: Actor
- Years active: 1942–1972 (film & TV)

Gerard Heinz (born Gerhard Hinze; 2 January 1904 – 20 November 1972) was a German actor.

Heinz was born in Hamburg, Germany and later moved to Britain, where he changed his name and became a British citizen. He appeared in almost 60 films (including Caravan), and a number of stage productions. In the original 1942 production of Terence Rattigan's Flare Path, he played Count Skriczevinsky, a Polish pilot serving with the RAF in World War II.

A relationship with Joan Rodker, daughter of the modernist poet John Rodker, resulted in the birth of a son, Ernest, in Odessa in 1937. After their separation, Heinz married the actress Mary Kenton. They played respectively Mr. and Mrs. Serafin in the 1961 episode "Washday S.O.S." of the TV series The Cheaters. They also performed together in the TV series The Sullavan Brothers, and in the ITC crime drama series The Four Just Men, and a number of other films.

== Filmography ==
- Thunder Rock (1942) – Hans Harma (uncredited)
- Went the Day Well? (1942) – Schmidt (uncredited)
- English Without Tears (1944) – Polish Officer
- Caravan (1946) – Don Carlos
- Frieda (1947) – Polish Priest
- The First Gentleman (1948) – Dr. Stockmar
- Broken Journey (1948) – Joseph Romer
- The Fallen Idol (1948) – Ambassador
- Sleeping Car to Trieste (1948) – Ambassador
- Portrait from Life (1948) – Heine
- That Dangerous Age (1949) – Dr. Thorvald
- The Bad Lord Byron (1949) – Austrian Officer
- The Lost People (1949) – Professor
- State Secret (1950) – Tomasi Bendel
- The Clouded Yellow (1950) – Dr. Karl Cesare
- Traveller's Joy (1950) – Helstrom
- White Corridors (1951) – Dr. Macuzek
- His Excellency (1952) – Prime Minister
- Private Information (1952) – Alex Hartmann
- Top Secret (1952) – Russian Director of Plant
- Desperate Moment (1953) – German Prison Doctor
- The Cruel Sea (1953) – Polish Captain
- The Prisoner (1955) – The Doctor
- You Pay Your Money (1957) – Dr. Burger
- Seven Thunders (1957) – Von Kronitz
- The Mark of the Hawk (1957) – Governor General
- The Man Inside (1958) – Robert Stone
- The House of the Seven Hawks (1959) – Inspector Sluiter
- I Aim at the Stars (1960) – Professor Oberth
- Offbeat (1961) – Jake
- Highway to Battle (1961) – Constantin
- The Guns of Navarone (1961) – German Surgeon (uncredited)
- Operation Snatch (1962) – Col. Waldock
- Mystery Submarine (1963) – German Admiral
- Boy with a Flute (1964)
- Operation Crossbow (1965) – German Officer (uncredited)
- Devils of Darkness (1965) – Bouvier
- The Heroes of Telemark (1965) – Enhardt
- The Projected Man (1966) – Prof. Lembach
- Where the Bullets Fly (1966) – Venstram
- The Dirty Dozen (1967) – Card-Playing German Officer (uncredited)
- Venom (a.k.a. The Legend of Spider Forest) (1971) – Huber
