= Gertrud Isolani =

German journalist (1899–1988)

- Born: Gertrud Ida Caecilie Regina Isaacsohn; 7 February 1899; Dresden, Saxony, Germany
- Died: 19 January 1988 (aged 88); Riehen BS, Switzerland
- Education: Cäcilien-Realgymnasium, Berlin
- Occupations: journalist, writer, translator
- Spouse: Berthold Sternberg (1877-1945)
- Children: Ursula Sternberg (1922-1965)
- Parent(s): Eugen Isaacsohn aka Eugen Isolani (1860-1932); Betty Perl (1873-1978)

Gertrud Isolani (born Gertrud Isaacsohn: 7 February 1899 – 19 January 1988) was a widely read journalist-commentator in Germany during the years of the so-called "Weimar" Republic. In 1933 her writing was banned. Her father having died in 1932, and already conscious of the rising tide of Antisemitism which had helped the populists to power, she left Germany, and settled in Paris. From here she continued to write for German-language exile newspaper, Pariser Tageblatt and for the French and Swiss press. In connection with her race and her record as a liberal-leaning journalist during the 1920s, she lived under conditions of intensifying difficulty in France after 1940, but survived. At the end of 1942, after several failed attempts, she succeeded in transferring to Switzerland. She lived out her final 45 years near Basel. After 1945 she resumed her work as a journalist and author, but never again achieved the level of success she had enjoyed in Germany before 1933.

== Life and works ==
=== Provenance and early years ===
Gertrud Ida Caecilie Regina Isaacsohn was born in Dresden. The family relocated in 1900, and she grew up in Berlin where Eugen Isaacsohn (1860–1932) her father, who had come originally from Marienburg in East Prussia, worked as a journalist and theater critic. One source describes the home in which she grew up as "intellectually stimulating", while another refers to Eugen Isolani having gathered around himself a circle of intellectuals, writers and artists, to which Gertrud responded by displaying a precocious talent for writing, She attended Berlin's "Cäcilien-Realgymnasium" (secondary school), passing her "Abitur" (school leaving exam) at the unusually young age of 17. War was raging to the east, the south and the west which limited career options for members of her generation. She quickly followed her father into journalism, producing short stories and other contributions to the "Feuilleton" (arts and culture) sections for the Berlin newspapers. One of the first papers for which she worked was Rudolf Mosse's mass-circulation Berliner Tageblatt, to which her father already contributed for many years, and which at this time had a circulation of around a quarter of a million. Her initial contributions appeared under the pseudonym "Ger Trud". She would remain a regular contributor to the Berliner Tageblatt till 1933. Weekly publications for which she worked after leaving school in 1916 included Die Woche (August Scherl Verlag) and the Berliner Illustrirte Zeitung (Ullstein Verlag). Initially she contributed short stories and articles on a range of general topics to the "Feuilleton" (arts and culture) sections: over time she became known, in particular, for theatre criticism and book reviews. At some stage before 1899 Eugen Isaacsohn had started to use the pseudonym "Eugen Isolani" for his written work. The name change was later explained as a response to rising antisemitism. Soon after embarking on her own journalistic career, Gertrud Isaacsohn dropped the pseudonym "Ger Trud" and instead identified herself to readers and others as "Gertrud Isolani", which is the name by which she is most frequently identified in subsequent sources.

During the first part of her career as a journalist Gertrud Isolani also worked, between 1917 and 1919, as a secretary for the jurist and member of the Prussian Parliament, Eugen Leidig. In 1918 she completed her first book, a biographical study of the poet-author, Christian Morgenstern (1871–1914) which was published in 1919. In addition to her writing career, several sources mention her work as a radio presenter during the early years of public broadcasting in the 1920s.

=== Marriage and career ===
Gertrud Isolani married Berthold Sternberg at Berlin in 1921. Sternberg and his brother were co-owners of "Aerozon-Fabrik", a Berlin-based business which manufactured porcelain products such as air purifiers, vaporizers, perfume burners, night-lights and light fittings. (Ownership of the business changed in 1933.) The couple's daughter Ursula later came to the attention of literary scholars as a result of the humorous letters she exchanged with various of her author friends, such as Arthur Silbergleit. Gertrud Isolani became a member of the executive committee for the "Association of German Translators" ("Bund deutscher Übersetzer" / BdÜ), which existed between 1928 and 1933, under the chairmanship of Erwin Magnus, the translator into German (and literary agent) of Jack London. The other committee members were Ida Jacob-Anders (1871–?), Käthe Miethe, Friedrich von Oppeln-Bronikowski, Lothar Schmidt (1862–1931) and Paul Wiegler.

=== Hitler and race ===
By the later 1920s she was becoming an increasingly high-profile member of Berlin's literary scene. Her voice was known to thousands of Berliners through her regular radio contributions. She was also completely open about her Jewishness. After the 1929 unemployment rose rapidly and economic destitution became increasingly common across Germany. Politics became increasingly polarised and parliament became deadlocked. During the early 1930s Gertrud Isolani was increasingly targeted by the right-wing populist press. "Asphaltliteratin" was one of the barely translatable soubriquets repeatedly thrown at her. Another, more readily translatable but also more troubling to post-Holocaust generations, was "jüdische Kulturbolschiwistin". The Hitler government took power in January 1933 and lost no time in transforming Germany into a one-party dictatorship. Antisemitism was quickly transformed from a mere toxic manifestation of populist street politics into a core pillar of government philosophy and strategy. Apart from those who were not engaged in direct political activism, many were slow to believe the evidence of their own eyes. In May 1933 the BdÜ was one of a number of writers' organisations forcibly "integrated" into the new National Chamber of Writers, newly created by Propaganda Minister Goebbels. Membership of the government backed National Chamber of Writers was essential for anyone wishing to pursue a career as a writer, but Isolani was excluded from it on account of her race-religion. No longer able to pursue her profession in Germany, and possibly also on account of her experiences as a target of the populist newspapers, Gertrud Isolani understood what was happening relatively quickly. With her daughter and husband (who had been forced to dispose of his manufacturing business at around the same time) Isolani was among an estimated 26,000 Germans relocating to Paris during the months immediately after Hitler took power in 1933.

=== France and internment ===
In Paris she worked as a contributing editor for the German language anti-fascist "Pariser Tageblatt" (daily newspaper): colleagues included Thomas and Heinrich Mann. Following the closure of the newspaper through a "Journalists' Putsch", for the "Pariser Tageszeitung" which performed many of the same functions for newspaper readers among the growing community of exiled non-Nazis who arrived from Germany between 1933 and 1940. She also wrote for a number of French newspapers and worked as a correspondent for several Swiss media outlets. In addition, she produced several novellas and short stories and produced of translations of (mainly) French-language articles into German.

After the 1940 invasion, Isolani and her daughter, like several thousand other refugees from Hitler's German, were ordered to report to the municipal authorities. Identified as enemy aliens, the women among them were gathered together and detained in the Vélodrome d'Hiver (sports stadium) in central Paris. (The men were taken separately to the Buffalo Stadium.) They were held for about two weeks in the velodrome, under increasingly insanitary conditions, and then were transported to the southern half of France, which over the next couple of years would by ruled under a puppet government from Vichy, enjoying a greater (albeit progressively diminishing) level of autonomy than the northern half of France which was placed under direct German military administration with effect from June 1940. The refugees internees were almost all Jews or Communists (or both). During the early part of June 1940 they were transported by train to various internment camps in Vichy France, far to the south. Isolani and her daughter were taken to the Camp at Gurs which had been hastily established a few years earlier to accommodate defeated anti-Franco "Brigadists" returning north after the Spanish Civil War. Now it was re-deployed as an internment camp for German women refugees from Hitler. In 1940 it had still not been provided with the level of security commonly associated with wartime internment camps, but its extremely remote location surrounded by high mountains still rendered escape beyond the very small village of Gurs something of a challenge. Nevertheless, conditions in the camp were dire in terms of sanitation and accommodation. (Note: "...when the word 'Gurs is mentioned, memories awaken of gnawing hunger, dirt, vermin, epidemics and lurking death"' Gertrud Isolani in "Stast ohne Männer", here translated and quoted by Carol Poore in her book 'The Bonds of Labor: German Journeys to the Working World, 1890-1990' (Wayne State University Press, 2000) Also worth referencing, for readers willing to tackle the German language, is the original of the quote, which has been reproduced in a number of sources: "Wo in der ganzen Welt das Wort ‚Gurs‘ fällt, da erwachen die Erinnerungen und Vorstellungen von Baracken in einer Schlammwüste, von Leibes- und Seelennot, von nagendem Hunger, Schmutz, Ungeziefer, Epidemien und schleichendem Tod.") During that first summer plenty of the women interned in the camp escaped simply by walking out of the camp and continuing down the mountains past the village. (Note: Although she escaped within a couple of months of her arrival at the camp, after End of World War II in Europe Gertrud Isolani became one of the best known of the many women held in the Gurs internment camp thanks to the publication of her semi-autobiographical novel "Stadt ohne Männer" ("City without men") which described life and the camp and was published in a number of editions between 1945 and 1979, eventually appearing in seven different languages.)

In June or July 1940 Gertrud Isolani and her daughter were among those whose escaped from Camp Gurs. They managed to link up with her husband and it seems to have been as a threesome that they lived "underground" in Vichy France. Living underground meant not being registered with the townhall for the district where they were. During the two years 1940 – 1942 the circumscribed autonomy allowed by the German authorities to the puppet government under Maréchal Pétain diminished progressively. In November 1942 German forces occupied southern France in force, partially as a response to the arrival of American forces in French North Africa. By this time the French gendarmes in towns and, especially, major cities were increasingly being accompanied or replaced by uniformed Gestapo officers. 1942 was also the year in which large scale deportation of German Jews in France began: urgent grapevine reports indicated that those found and captured were being sent by train to German death camps in the east. The danger to German Jews (and other German "political" exiles) living hidden in southern France were increased by the growing danger from the authorities to any French citizen helping them. On 11 November 1942, with her (by this time badly traumatised) daughter, and after two failed attempts to cross the border, Ursula Isolani succeeded in crossing the border into Switzerland. Sources are largely silent on Isolani's whereabouts and activities between her escape from Camp Gurs and her arrival in Switzerland, and that silence extends to the modalities of their escape from occupied France. In 1969 Isolani told an interviewer that her survival had been the result of "lucky coincidences, cunning, and, most especially, thanks to the help of many good people". (Note: "... konnte aber dank glücklicher Zufälle, mit List und nicht zuletzt auch dank der Hilfe vieler guter Menschen 1942 in die Schweiz gelangen.".)

=== Switzerland and internment ===
Isolani and her daughter were held in a succession of Swiss refugee camps between 1942 and 1944. Reassuringly, these were neither Hitlerian death camps nor as insalubrious as the internment camp at Gurs from which she had escaped in June/July 1940. It is nevertheless clear from some of Isolani's preserved observations that the Swiss camps presented their own challenges:

- "We had a bellyful of intrigue, harassment and trickery. There was never any sign of effective management oversight. For weeks on end there was no nourishment in the soup, and certainly no meat. The responsible commissar held on to that and sold it on at the highest price available."
  "Intrigen, Zensurschikanen, Schiebungen gab es in Moudon in Hülle und Fülle. Eine wirksame Dienstaufsicht war nirgends zu erkennen. Wochenlang bekamen wir kein Gramm Fett in der Suppe und Fleisch schon gar nicht. Der zuständige Kommissar hatte es verschoben und zu teuersten Preisen weiterverkauft."
  Gertrud Isolani on the refugee camp in the former barracks at Moudon

- "There was much fashionable antisemitism among the women supervising the inmates. They took Hitler's [racist] slogans very much to heart. All too often one heard the term 'Jewish sow'."
  "Der Antisemitismus dieser Aufseherinnen war grosse Mode. Sie hatten sich die Hitlerparolen ganz zu eigen gemacht und die Bezeichnung ‚Saujüdin’ hörte man oft genug."
  Gertrud Isolani on the refugee camp at Saint-Cergue

- "My husband, the oldest inmate in the camp, failed to keep up with the others one day [when the detainees were taken out of the camp on their daily walk, supervised by a policeman from the village], because he was mildly handicapped. The policeman threatened him with a rubber baton and harshly mocked him. Everyone laughed, including members of the public who were gawping"
  "Mein Mann, der Älteste im Lager, blieb eines Tages ein wenig zurück, da er etwas gehbehindert war. Mit scharfen Worten drohte ihm der Polizist mit dem Gummiknüppel und verhöhnte ihn barsch. Alles lachte, auch die Gaffer aus dem Publikum."
  Gertrud Isolani, recalling her experiences as a refugee/inmate at Moudon

For slightly under two years the two of them were held in a succession of three refugee camps. One was a converted barracks at Moudon (VD) in the Francophone west of the country. Another was at Saint-Cergue, at the other end of the same canton. Clearly the Swiss were not in the business of running death camps, and the physical conditions were evidently less dire than those they had encountered at Gurs. In addition, in at least one of the camps and possibly all three of them, Gertrud and Ursula were reunited with their husband/father.

In 1944, as the end of the European war appeared more firmly on the horizon, the family were finally able to set up home together away from the refugee camps. They settled at Binningen, then as now a resolutely separate municipality that adjoins, on its south side, the city of Basel. Berthold Sternberg died at the start of the following summer, a day after learning that the war was finally over. His widow would later report his parting words as "Jetzt kann ich in Frieden kapitulieren" (loosely, "now I can die in peace"). Ursula Sternberg was aged 22/23 when her father died, and continued to live in Binningen with her mother till her own death aged 43: Ursula predeceased not only her mother but also her maternal grandmother. Ursula was badly damaged, physically and mentally, by wartime experiences from which she never really recovered, despite the assiduous and loving care she received from her mother, along with the doctors and nurses.

=== Later years ===
After she was widowed in 1945, Isolani returned to writing to support the family that remained to her. As before, she combined journalistic work with authorship of novels and short stories. There is also mention of stage works and further autobiographical compositions. Newspapers for which she wrote included the German language National-Zeitung and its successor, the Basler Zeitung. She also worked for Swiss Radio. She never again achieved success as a writer on anything approaching the same scale that she had known in Berlin in the 1920s, however.

Gertrud Isolani's mother lived to a great age. By 1969 she had been moved into "La Charmille", a Jewish retirement home in Riehen, a forty-minute tram ride across the city from Binningen. In 1985, which was when the first volume of Gertrud Isolani's two volume biography of Golda Meir was published, Isolani herself was a resident at the same retirement home. By the time she died she was reported also to have completed the second volume, but it has not yet (in 2020) been published.

== Recognition ==
- 1974 Binningen arts prize ("Kulturpreis Binningen")
- 1979 Basel prize of honour ("Ehrengabe des Baselstädt")

== Output (selection) ==
- Briefe, Gespräche, Begegnungen – Part I of a memoire: Berlin, Frankreich, Schweiz. Leinenausgabe, Böhlau, Köln 1985, ISBN 3-412-01683-3. – if two planned volumes, only this one volume appeared. This volume was published as Kein Blatt vor den Mund: Briefe, Gespräche, Begegnungen – Teil 1 der Memoiren: Berlin, Frankreich, Schweiz. Wieder: Basileia-Verlag, Basel 1985
- Der Donor. Roman; das Problem der künstlichen Befruchtung. J. G. Bläschke, Darmstadt 1969 (originally published in Biel in 1949).
- Golda Meir. Israels Mutter Courage. 2nd edition. Verlag Peter, Rothenburg ob der Tauber 1970.
- Der Jünger des Rabbi Jochanan. Erzählungen. Vorwort Max Brod. Starczewski, München 1967.
- Die letzte Havanna. Kriminalroman (= Die grünen Kriminal. 11) Fraumünster, Zürich 1944.
- Maîtressen. Erzählung. Hegereiter, Rothenburg ob der Tauber 1962.
- Malererbe. Studie zum Lebenswerk Christian Morgensterns. Pfeil Verlag, Berlin 1919.
- Nacht aller Nächte. Roman des Erzvaters Abraham. Herbert Reich Verlag, Hamburg 1957.
- Schwiegermütter, Schwiegermütter. Eine psychologische, kulturhistorische, soziologische und humoristische Studie. Gissler, Basel 1975.
- Stadt ohne Männer. Roman. Falken Verlag, Zürich 1945. Mehrfache Neuaufl., zuletzt Basler Zeitung, Basel 1979 ISBN 3-85815-052-5. Translated into 7 languages. It describes the author's experiences of Frauencamp Gurs (Gurs women's camp) (Note: One particlularly critical reviewer pointed out that this title was misleading, since at the time when the women were placed in the camp during May/June 1940, there were still an (unspecified but possibly quite small) number of male Spanish Civil War veterans being held in the camp.) in southern France.
