= Arthur Trebitsch =

Austrian writer and racial theorist

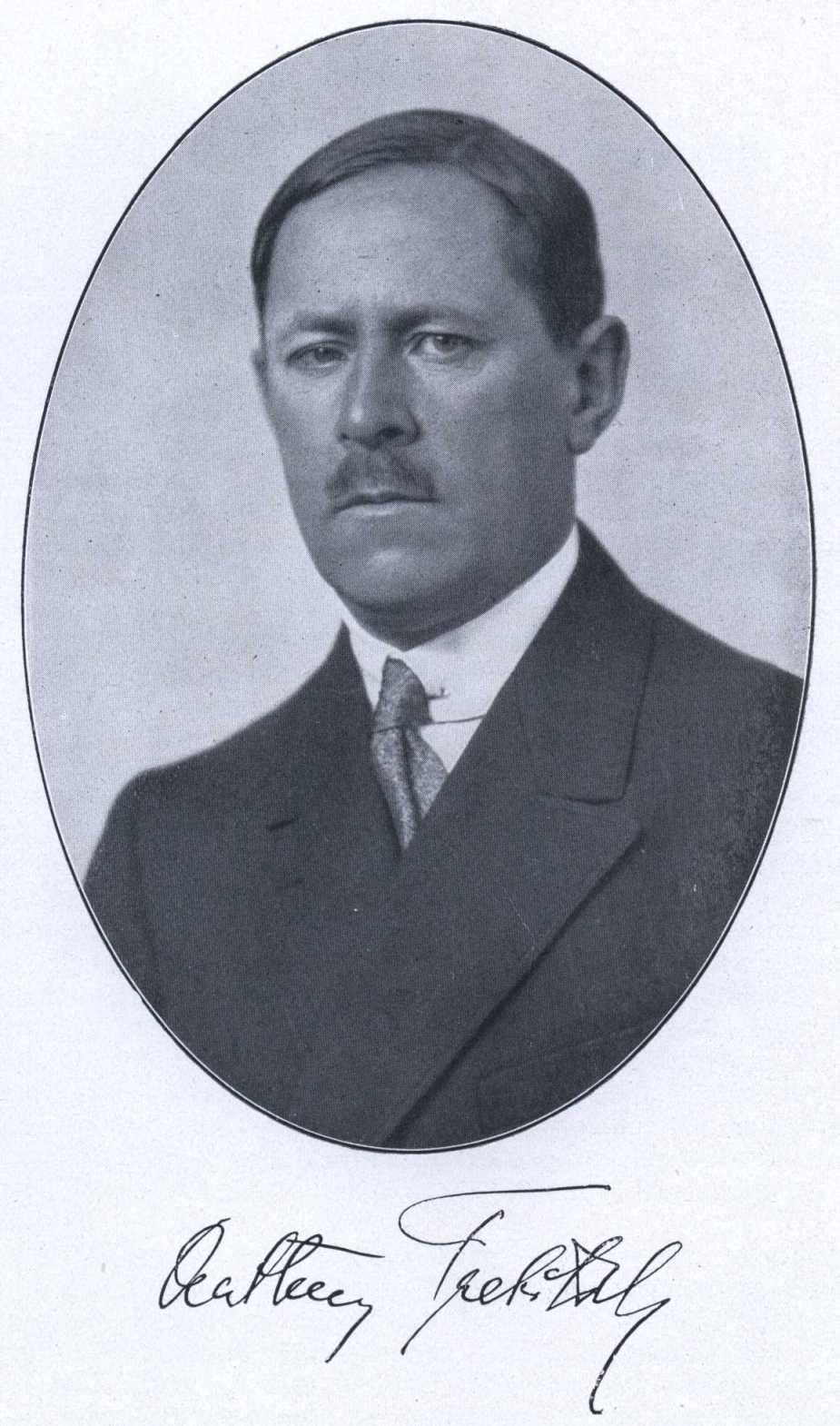
Arthur Trebitsch

Arthur Trebitsch (1880–1927) was an Austrian writer and racial theorist, known for being an antisemite of Jewish origin. He offered his services to help the fledgling Nazis to write their antisemitic literature, and was an influence on the early development of the Austrian branch of the Nazi Party.

== Life ==
Arthur Trebitsch was born on 17 April 1880 in Vienna, the son of wealthy Jewish silk industrialist Leopold Trebitsch. His older half-brother was the writer Siegfried Trebitsch. As a young man he came under the influence of fellow student Otto Weininger and the racial theorist Houston Stewart Chamberlain, whose Viennese circles he frequented. From these writers, Trebitsch developed a radical German nationalist and antisemitic ideology.

Following the lead of his brother Siegfried, he tried to become a creative writer but was unsuccessful. He completed a novel in 1909 and a collection of essays in 1910, but they remained unpublished. Trebitsch had them published at his own expense by his own specially founded press: Antaios Verlag, named after the mythological giant Antaeus in reference to a passage in Richard Wagner's 1850 essay The Art Work of the Future.

Trebitsch was acutely sensitive to the fear that he was not taken seriously as an intellectual, but was only tolerated because of his wealth and generosity to other writers. He became embittered by the greater success of his half-brother. His increasing rejection of Judaism was accompanied by a distrust the academic establishment, and evidence of a more general paranoia began to show. In 1909 he officially left the Jewish religious community. He subsequently denied that he ever was Jewish, saying "I am not a Jew, I never was one, and I never will be one". He insisted that he had only partial Jewish ancestry, and was "free born, high born and to the manner born" as a true German. He repeatedly tried to sue people for slander if they referred to him as Jewish. In 1912, he unsuccessfully tried to sue his half-brother Siegfried and the critic Ferdinand Gregori, who had written a bad review of his short stories. His brother had agreed with Gregori, describing Arthur's work as "amateurish" and suggesting that he suffered from "megolamania and paranoia". The trial resulted in Trebitsch's public humiliation as the press ridiculed him.

Trebitsch became convinced of an international "Jewish world conspiracy against the German people", which was behind the outbreak of World War I. From this point on he devoted his energies to the moral strengthening of Germany. After the war he gave a series of anti-Jewish lectures in German cities. He apparently came to believe that Providence had set him the task of becoming the saviour of the Nordic race. Jews, he believed, were trying to kill him with "poisoned electric rays". He detailed these plots against him in his 1923 book Die Geschichte meines "Verfolgungswahns" ("The Story of my 'Paranoia'").

In the early 1920s, Trebitsch helped to set up and fund the Austrian branch of the Nazi party, allegedly being considered its leader for a brief period.

Trebitsch died on 26 September 1927 in Eggersdorf bei Graz at the age of 47.

== Theories ==
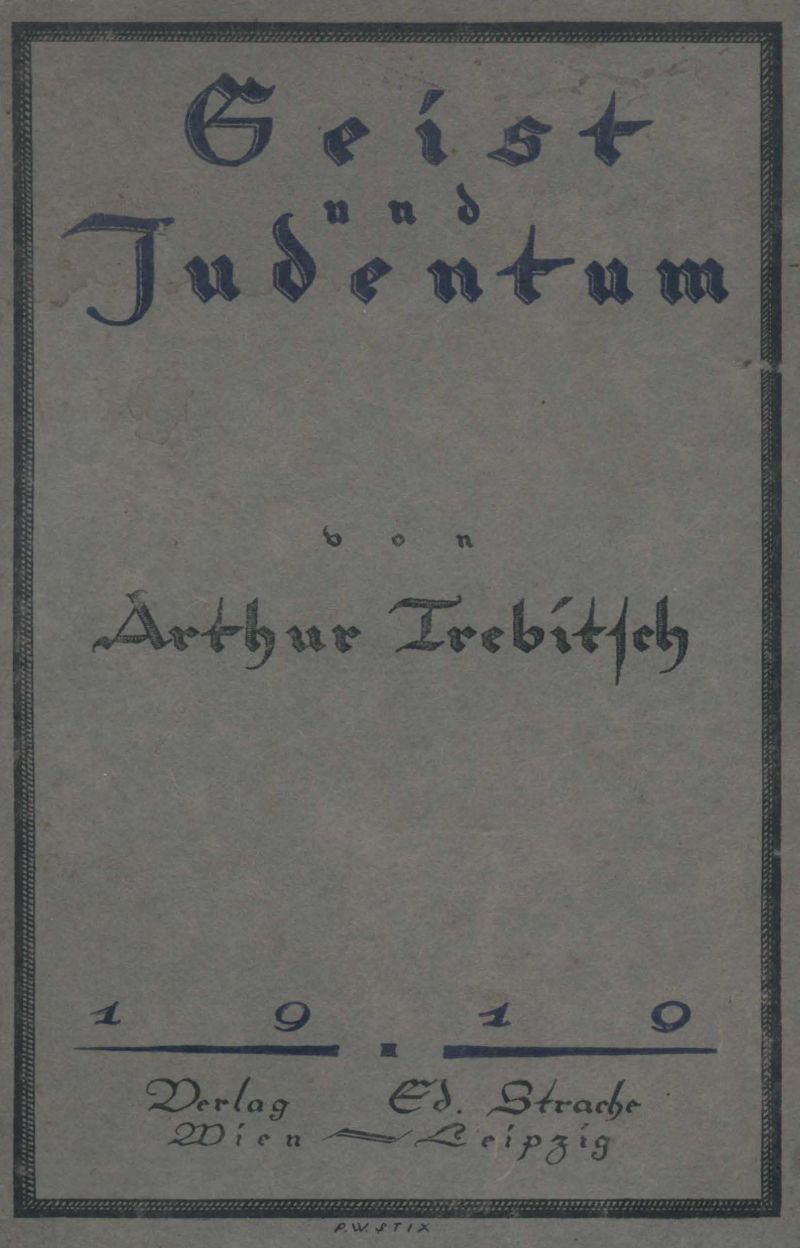
Trebitsch's book Geist und Judentum

Trebitsch's theories were first articulated in his 1919 book Geist und Judentum. According to Trebitsch Jewish presence in Europe was fundamentally destructive to the spirit ("geist") of the Aryan peoples. The Jews were an "Ungeist" within Europe which must be excised. However, he believed that an antitoxin works best when it is derived from the toxin itself. People of Jewish ancestry who reject Judaism, such as himself, will be the spiritual force to destroy the corrupting influence of the Jewish presence in Europe. Jesus Christ was the archetype of a Judaised Aryan who had overcome and rejected the Jewishness within himself. The Ashkenazi Jews of Eastern Europe were the antithesis of this, representing the "toxin" itself in its most virulent form. They had to be forcibly expelled from Europe, though a few might be absorbed into the Aryan population after a long period of forced labour eradicated the Jewishness from their souls.

While Aryans possessed a "primary" creative intellect, Jews were only capable of "secondary" thinking, taking original ideas and adapting them. In doing so, they introduced a degenerating element which corrupted thought. Sigmund Freud's psychoanalysis epitomised this, as it demonstrated an "erotomania" typical of the Jewish mind.

== Trebitsch and Hitler ==
Despite apparently believing himself to be the providentially ordained leader of the German people, he gave generous financial support to Adolf Hitler and the Nazi party. Trebitsch knew both Hitler and Dietrich Eckart personally. Eckart refers to Trebitsch in his book Der Bolschewismus von Moses bis Lenin: Zwiegespräch zwischen Hitler und mir ("Bolshevism from Moses to Lenin: Dialogues Between Hitler and Me"). This records a conversation he is supposed to have had about Trebitsch, in which he refers to him as "a Jewish writer against Jews - at least he thinks he does. His every other word is "We Aryans"". In 1935, after Trebitsch's death, Hitler recommended an acquaintance, "Read every sentence he has written. He has unmasked the Jews as no one else did". Hitler also noted that Trebitsch had warned him against the "smart-alecky Zionist snakes" in the party who would undermine it from within. Hitler had at one time toyed with giving Trebitsch Alfred Rosenberg's role as head of ideological education (Rosenberg was one of the "snakes" Trebitsch disliked).

== In culture ==
In 1923 a barely fictionalised representation of Arthur Trebitsch (called "Dr. Trebitsch") appeared in Joseph Roth's novel Das Spinnennetz (the Spider's Web). Dr. Trebitsch is the head of a secret ultra-right-wing antisemitic organisation.

Theodor Lessing uses Trebitsch as one of his principal sources for the concept of the self-hating Jew in his pioneering study of the phenomenon.

== Works ==
- Galileo Galilei. Ein Trauerspiel in fünf Akten. Wien 1901; 2. Auflage Antaios-Verlag, Berlin 1920.
- Aus Max Dorns Werdegang. Ein Lebensabschnitt. 1909; 2. Auflage Antaios-Verlag, Wien/Leipzig, 1920.
- Der Fall Ferdinand Gregori und Siegfried Trebitsch. Ein Beitrag zur deutschen Literaturgeschichte unserer Zeit. Bachmair, München 1914.
- Erkenntnis und Logik. Braumüller, Wien 1917.
- Friedrich der Große. Ein offener Brief an Thomas Mann. Wilhelm Borngräber Verlag, Berlin 1916; Antaios-Verlag, Wien/Leipzig 1916.
- Gespräche und Gedankengänge. Wilhelm Borngräber Verlag, Berlin 1916; 2. Auflage Antaios-Verlag, Wien/Leipzig 1920.
- Seitenpfade. Ein Buch Verse. Wilhelm Borngräber Verlag, Berlin 1917; 2. Auflage Antaios-Verlag, Wien/Leipzig 1920.
- Geist und Leben. Wilhelm Borngräber Verlag, Berlin 1917; Antaios-Verlag, Berlin/Wien 1921.
- Aus des Ratsherrn Johannes Teufferius Lebensbeschreybung. Antaios-Verlag, Wien/Leipzig 1920.
- Nikolaus Lenaus geistiges Vermächtnis. Antaios-Verlag, Wien/Leipzig 1920.
- Wir Deutsche aus Österreich. Ein Weckruf. Antaios-Verlag, Wien/Leipzig 1921.
- Zur Förderung der Persönlichkeiten. Wilhelm Borngräber Verlag, Berlin 1917; Antaios-Verlag, Wien/Leipzig 1920.
- Drei Vorträge mit Zwischenstücken. Die erste Darstellung der erkenntniskritischen Grundgedanken des Verfassers. Wilhelm Borngräber Verlag, Berlin 1917; Antaios-Verlag, Wien/Leipzig 1920.
- Deutscher Geist – oder Judentum. Der Weg der Befreiung. Verlag Ed. Strache, Berlin/Wien/Leipzig 1919; Antaios-Verlag, Berlin 1921.
- Geist und Judentum. Verlag Ed. Strache, Wien/Leipzig 1919.
- Deutscher Geist aus Österreich. Ausgewählte dichterische Deutschtumsbekenntnisse. Antaios-Verlag, Berlin/Leipzig 1920.
- Wort und Leben. Eine grundlegende Untersuchung. Antaios-Verlag, Berlin 1920.
- Die böse Liebe. Novellen. Verlag Ed. Strache, Wien 1920.
- Die Geschichte meines „Verfolgungswahnes“. Antaios-Verlag, Wien/Leipzig 1923.
- Arische Wirtschaftsordnung. Eine grundlegende Untersuchung. Antaios-Verlag, Wien/Leipzig 1925.
- Der Dichter, der Denker, der Redner, der Arier. Antaios-Verlag, Leipzig 1926.
- Der brennende Mensch. Antaios-Verlag, Leipzig 1930 (aus seinem Nachlass).
