= Clara Birnberg =

British artist

Clare Winsten
- Clare Winsten, 1916 portrait by Isaac Rosenberg
- Born: Clara Birnberg; 1894
- Died: 1989 (aged 94–95)
- Known for: Painting
- Spouse: Stephen Weinstein

Clara Birnberg (1892 or 1894–1989) was a British artist, illustrator, portraitist and sculptor. After her marriage to the artist Stephen Weinstein, they changed their surname to Winsten (with her becoming Clare Winsten) and both became Quaker humanists.

== Biography ==
Birnberg, whose father was born in Ternopil in modern Ukraine, moved to England with her family in 1902. Studying at the Slade School of Fine Art between 1910 and 1912 with Isaac Rosenberg and David Bomberg, Birnberg became the only female member of their 'Whitechapel Boys' circle of artists and poets, and was the only female exhibitor at the 1914 post-Impressionist exhibition "Twentieth Century Art: A Review of Modern Movements" at the Whitechapel Art Gallery in which this circle played a major part.

Among her sculptures are one in the Toynbee Hall in Whitechapel, and one of Joan of Arc in the garden of George Bernard Shaw’s house in Ayot St Lawrence in Hertfordshire, where Shaw and the Winstens were neighbours (Stephen already had connections with Shaw). Clare illustrated Shaw's Buoyant Billions: A Comedy of No Manners in Prose (1949), and the posthumously published My Dear Dorothea: A practical system of Moral education for females Embodied in a letter to a young person Of that sex (1956), written when he was 21. In addition to painting Shaw a number of times, Birnberg also produced a 1946 bronze sculpture of him, which passed on his death to the Shaw Theatre and then (on its closure) to the Mayor of Camden. The British Museum also has a bronze bust of Shaw by her. She also made drawings of Shaw, as well as of Dmitri Shostakovich, Benjamin Britten and Mahatma Gandhi.

Her daughter Ruth Harrison was known as a campaigner for animal welfare. Ruth married Dexter Harrison, a London architect.
