= Joseph Leftwich =

British critic and translator

- Joseph Leftwich, c. 1937
- Born: Joseph Lefkowitz; 28 September 1892; Zutphen, Netherlands
- Died: 28 February 1983 (aged 90); Islington, London, England
- Occupations: Critic, translator

Joseph Leftwich (28 September 1892 – 28 February 1983), born Joseph Lefkowitz, was a British critic and translator into English of Yiddish literature.

== Biography ==
Leftwich was born in the Netherlands. He is known particularly for his 1939 anthology The Golden Peacock of Yiddish poetry, and his 1957 biography of Israel Zangwill. He was one of the 'Whitechapel Boys' group (the others being John Rodker, Isaac Rosenberg and Stephen Winsten) of aspiring young Jewish writers in London's East End, in the period roughly 1910–1914. He himself retrospectively coined the name, to include also the artists David Bomberg and Mark Gertler.

Leftwich was a vegetarian and an active patron of the Jewish Vegetarian Society. He wrote biographies of vegetarian writers for The Jewish Vegetarian and an introduction for the book The Tree of Life, edited by Philip Pick, an anthology of essays on Judaism and vegetarianism.

His daughter Joan married the American writer Joseph McElroy.

== Works ==
- War (1915)
- What will happen to the Jews? (1936)
- Along the Years, Poems: 1911–1937 (1937)
- The Golden Peacock: An anthology of Yiddish Poetry (1939)
- Yisroel: The First Jewish Omnibus (1933)
- The Tragedy of Anti-Semitism (1948) with A. K. Chesterton
- Israel Zangwill (1957) biography
- The Way We Think (2 volumes) (1969) editor
- Anthology of Modern Yiddish Literature (1974)
- A Distant Voice: An Autobiography of Samuel Lewin, translator
- Years at the Ending : Poems 1892–1982 (1984)
- Soldier' song: Translation of Bálint Balassi's poem "Egy katonaének" (Hungarian)

== Bibliography ==
- Joseph Leftwich at Eighty-Five: A Collective Evaluation (1978)
