= Elisabeth Castonier =

German journalist

Elisabeth Castonier (6 March 1894 - 24 September 1975) was a German writer.

Castonier was the daughter of the painter Felix Borchardt and spent her early childhood in Dresden until her family moved to Paris. Her grandfather was Jewish. In 1912 she moved to Berlin, and in 1923 married the Danish singer Paul Castonier, from whom she later divorced. She wrote satires in the weekly paper Die Ente, but during the Nazi period she went in exile to Vienna and after the Anschluss in 1938 through Italy and Denmark to London. Here she wrote children's books and also a book about Christian opposition to the Nazis. In London she was also a correspondent for the News Chronicle and the New Statesman and also for emigrant newspapers like the Pariser Tageszeitung and the Wiener Tageblatt. In 1944 she worked as a farmhand in Hampshire. From 1950, she also corresponded regularly with Mary Tucholsky, the widow of writer Kurt Tucholsky.

== Works ==
- Frau, Knecht, Magd, 1932
- Eternal Front, London: James Clarke and Co. 1942
- Stürmisch bis heiter. Memoiren einer Außenseiterin, 1964

== Sources ==
- a short entry on Castonier
- Budke, Petra & Jutta Schulze. 1995. Schriftstellerinnen in Berlin 1871 bis 1945: Ein Lexikon zu Leben und Werk. Berlin. Orlanda.
- Castonier, Elisabeth. 1995 [1959]. Mill-Farm: Menschen und Tiere unter einem Dach. Berlin. Frankfurt/M.; Berlin. Ullstein TB.
- Castonier, Elisabeth. 1991 [1964]. Stürmisch bis heiter: Memoiren einer Außenseiterin. Berlin. Ullstein TB.
- Castonier, Elisabeth. 1989. Unwahrscheinliche Wahrheiten. Berlin. Ullstein TB.
