= Siegfried Trebitsch =

Austrian playwright, translator, novelist and poet

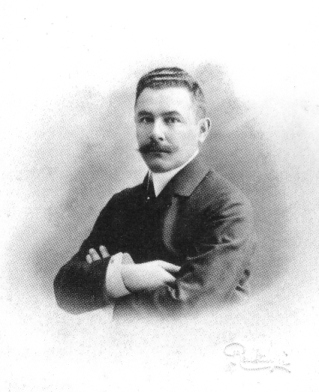
- Portrait from 1902
- Born: 22 December 1868; Vienna, Austria-Hungary
- Died: 3 June 1956 (aged 87)
- Resting place: Zurich, Switzerland
- Occupations: Translator; playwright; poet
- Years active: c. 1900–1956
- Notable work: Jitta's Atonement

Siegfried Trebitsch (22 December 1868 – 3 June 1956) was an Austrian playwright, translator, novelist and poet. Though prolific as a writer in various genres, he was best known for his German translations, especially of the works of the Irish playwright George Bernard Shaw, with whom he kept up a long and detailed correspondence. He is also known for translations of French writers, especially Georges Courteline.

== Life ==
Trebitsch was born on 22 December 1868, into a wealthy secular Jewish family, who "taught him nothing of Judaism or Christianity". His brother Arthur Trebitsch, despite his Jewish origin, became a noted Antisemite and early supporter of the Nazis. Siegfried identified himself as a Lutheran when he registered for military service. He entered the silk trade business of his stepfather Leopold, where he remained until 1903 when he took a year out for personal study and for travels across Europe and North Africa.

While in England he personally sought out Bernard Shaw, offering to translate his works and help build the playwright's reputation in Europe. This initiated a lengthy correspondence with Shaw that lasted until the Irish writer's death, and has since been published. Trebitsch became the sole German translator of Shaw during his lifetime. Three of Shaw's plays had their world premieres in Trebitsch's German translations. Pygmalion and The Millionairess were both first performed in Vienna. His last full-length play Buoyant Billions was first performed Zürich, to which Trebitsch had moved during World War II. In 1923 Shaw rewarded Trebitsch for his efforts by translating and adapting his play Frau Gitta's Sühne into English, as Jitta's Atonement. Trebitsch also cultivated links with French writers.

He took up his residence in Vienna, where he built the prestigious "Villa Trebitsch" designed by Ernst Gotthilf. He married in 1907 to the Hungarian Princess Antoinette Engalitscheff, the widow of a Russian Grand Duke who had been killed in 1904 fighting the Japanese. In the same year he was given honorary citizenship of the Municipality Wigstadtl in Austrian Silesia Kronlande. After World War I this became part of Czechoslovakia, so in 1920 he acquired Czechoslovak citizenship.

Trebitsch was a close friend of music critic Julius Korngold, father of Erich Korngold. He once suggested to him that one of his translations, a play called Die stille Stadt (The Silent City) would make a good opera. The play was adapted by Julius and his son Erich, who composed the music. Under the title Die tote Stadt it was a major success.

Trebitsch's relationship with his brother Arthur had become increasingly strained in the years before the First World War. Arthur was unable to replicate his brother's success as a writer, and was increasingly obsessed with the idea that there were Jewish conspiracies against him. In 1912, he unsuccessfully tried to sue Siegfried and the critic Ferdinand Gregori, who had written a bad review of his short stories. Siegfried had agreed with Gregori, describing Arthur's work as "amateurish" and suggesting that he suffered from "megolamania and paranoia". The trial resulted in Arthur's public humiliation as the press ridiculed him.

Trebitsch's own original works of this period are comparable to those of Franz Werfel, who dominated the Viennese cultural life in the 1930s. In his novels and short stories, he characterized contemporary Austrian society.

=== Escape from the Nazis ===
He continued to live in Vienna until the 1938 Anschluss, when Austria was absorbed into Nazi Germany. Despite being aware that his Jewish ethnicity would now be a problem for him, according to Blanche Patch, who knew him, he and his wife did not at first react:

At first they did not take much notice, but one day, when they were motoring home, they were stopped and their car was confiscated. Then, during the night, they began to hear terrifying sounds. They grew alarmed. As it happened, Herr Trebitsch had arranged to go to Switzerland to lecture, and to take his wife with him. Using these passports, they stole out of Vienna one night each carrying a suitcase, and succeeded in making the frontier. Nevertheless, all their considerable property was seized and Herr Trebitsch's publishers in Berlin disappeared.

Trebitsch fled to Paris, where he was awarded an honorary French citizenship in 1939 in recognition of his promotion of French culture in Germany. After the invasion of France in 1940, he moved to Zurich. While there he wrote to Shaw asking him for financial support. He also attempted to raise funds by unsuccessfully claiming royalties for The Chocolate Soldier, a German operetta based on Arms and the Man. Even though he was not the translator, he claimed that he had the sole rights to German versions of Shaw. He applied for an immigration visa to the United States in June 1941, as a precaution, but with Allied victory this was unnecessary. He remained in Zurich for the rest of his life.

=== Post war ===
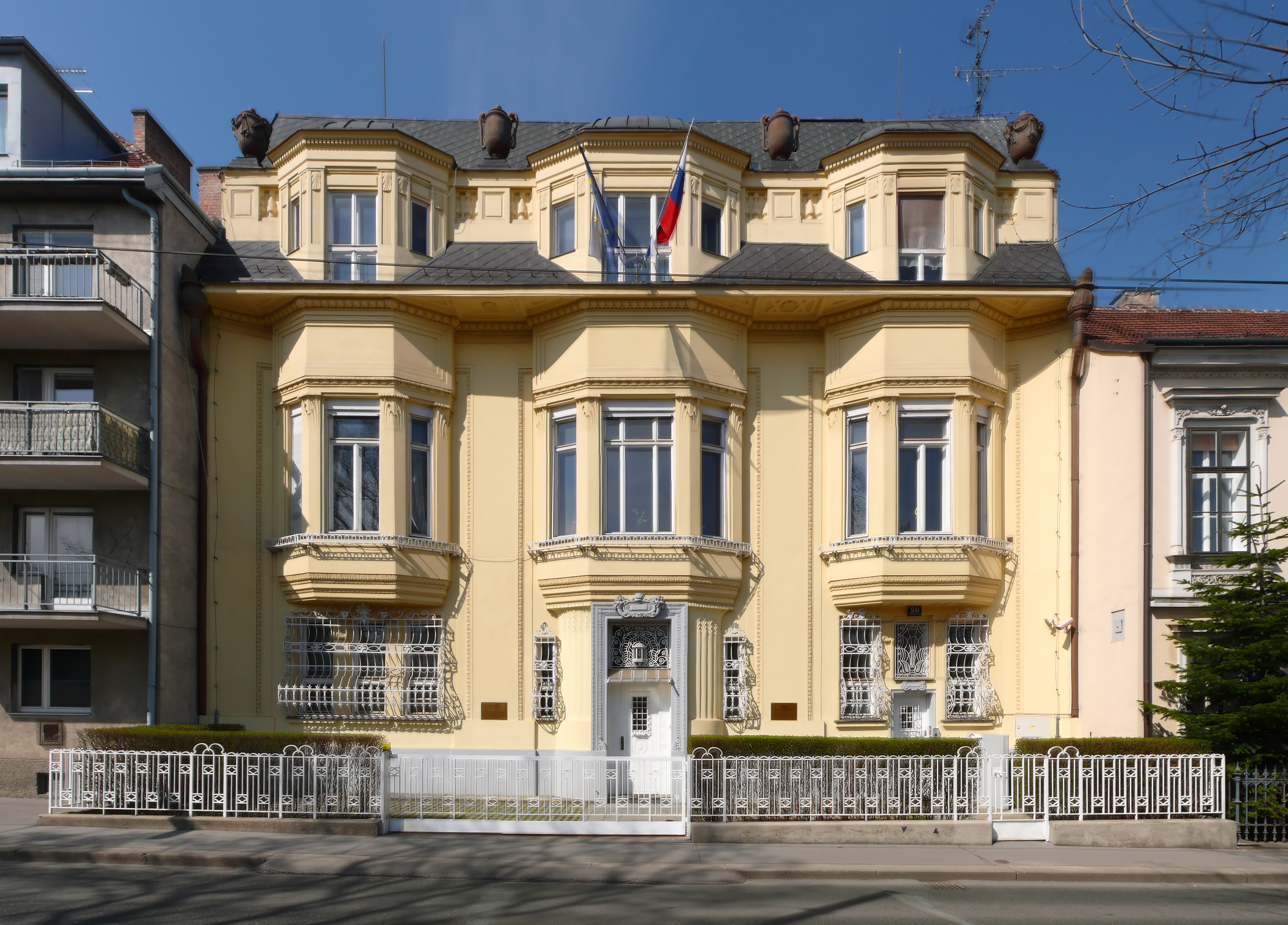
Trebitsch's house in Vienna, the Villa Trebitsch, which is now the official residence of the ambassador of Slovakia

After the war, Trebitsch's house in Vienna was restored to him, but he had no wish to return to Austria. He sold it to the Czechoslovak embassy. He visited Shaw after the war, but when he planned a second visit in 1948, the irritable Shaw wrote "do not come", later writing that European ideas of intimacy were considered "sentimental nonsense" in England. Trebitsch was responsible for the translation and first production of Shaw's last full-length play, Buoyant Billions which was first performed in German in Trebitsch's new home, Zurich, under the title Zu viel Geld.

In 1951 Trebitsch published an autobiography, Chronik eines Lebens (Chronicle of a Life), which was published in English, translated by Eithne Wilkins and Ernst Kaiser, two years later. A few years after Shaw's death in 1950, Trebitsch arranged to sell his collection of letters from the playwright. In 1956, after the sale had been arranged, he went to collect the letters. In the words of Samuel A. Weiss, "Trebitsch went to his bank, retrieved the heavy bundle of correspondence, and suffered a heart attack. He was in his eighty-eighth year. On 3 June, Siegfried Trebitsch—felled by the hand of his friend—died."

== Major works ==
- Gedichte, 1889
- Sawitri, 1890 (after Angelo De Gubernatis)
- Genesung, 1902
- Weltuntergang, 1903
- Das verkaufte Lächeln, 1905
- Das Haus am Abhang, 1906
- Ein letzter Wille, 1907
- Tagwandler, 1909
- Des Feldherrn erster Traum, 1910
- Ein Muttersohn, 1911
- Wellen und Wege, 1913
- Gefährliche Jahre, 1913
- Tod und die Liebe, 1914
- Spätes Licht, 1918
- Die Frau ohne Dienstag, 1919, filmed in 1920 by Eberhard Frowein
- Frau Gittas Sühne, 1920
- Die Last des Blutes, 1921
- Der Geliebte, 1922
- Renate Aldringen, 1929
- Mord im Nebel, 1931
- Die Heimkehr des Diomedes, 1941
- Chronik eines Lebens (Autobiography), 1951
