= Joan Rodker =

Joan M Rodker (1 May 1915, Kensington, London – 27 December 2010) was an English political activist and television producer.

The daughter of the modernist poet John Rodker and dancer Sonia Perovskaia Cohen, who placed her into care at age 18 months, where she remained until 11 years old. Later, Rodker lived with her mother and attended Haberdashers' Aske's School for Girls in Elstree, Hertfordshire, but did not shine academically. After failing the matriculation exam needed for university admission, she left school at 17. Improving her German in Prague at the insistence of her father, Rodker became attracted to Marxism, and migrated to Moscow in 1934, joining an acting troupe which toured Ukraine. After falling in love with the actor Gerhard Hinze (later known as Gerard Heinz), the couple had a son Ernest in 1937 while in Odessa. During her time in the Soviet Union, Rodker met Regina Fischer, with whom she later corresponded, and who subsequently became the mother of chess grandmaster Bobby Fischer. The relationship with Heinz did not survive the war.

Rodker helped to publicise the Sheffield Peace Conference in 1950, and was involved in several other such gatherings. Between 1950 and 1955, Rodker was involved with the Polish Cultural Institute and (with the artist Peter de Francia and John Berger) began the Soho fair. Rodker's Kensington home was described by the Telegraph obituary writer as the nearest Britain ever possessed to a "communist salon". She provided help and accommodation for people of a similar persuasion, including the American expatriate Clancy Sigal and the novelist Doris Lessing. Lessing used Rodker as a model for her character Molly Jacobs in her novel The Golden Notebook (1962).

During her career in television, Joan Rodker was a researcher on such series as Huw Wheldon's Monitor and ITV's Tempo and script editor on Armchair Theatre and the BBC's Thirty-Minute Theatre. In 1980, she worked as the Executive Producer of Thames Television's Armchair Thriller series, having previously worked as the script executive earlier in the programme's run.

Papers formerly in the possession of Joan Rodker were acquired by the Harry Ransom Humanities Research Center at the University of Texas at Austin in 2000.
