= Stephen Winsten =

Stephen Winsten (1893–1991) was the name adopted by Samuel Weinstein, one of the 'Whitechapel Boys' group of young Jewish men and future writers in London's East End in the years before World War I (the others included Isaac Rosenberg, John Rodker and Joseph Leftwich). In the First World War he was a conscientious objector, and imprisoned in Bedford and Reading gaols. He is now known for his works about George Bernard Shaw, and his writing on the life of Henry Salt.

He married the artist Clara Birnberg (1894–1989); they both became Quakers. She as Clare Winsten is known for some sculptures, including one of St. Joan in the garden of Shaw’s house in Ayot St Lawrence in Hertfordshire, where Shaw and the Winstens were neighbours. Stephen's and Clara's daughter Ruth Harrison, a conscientious objector in WW2, was known as a campaigner for animal rights.

== Works ==
- G.B.S. 90: Aspects of Bernard Shaw's Life and Work (1946); editor
- Days with Bernard Shaw (1948)
- Salt and His Circle (1951); preface by Shaw
- Shaw's Corner (1952)
- Jesting Apostle: The Private Life of Bernard Shaw (1956)
