= John Rodker =

English writer (1894–1955)

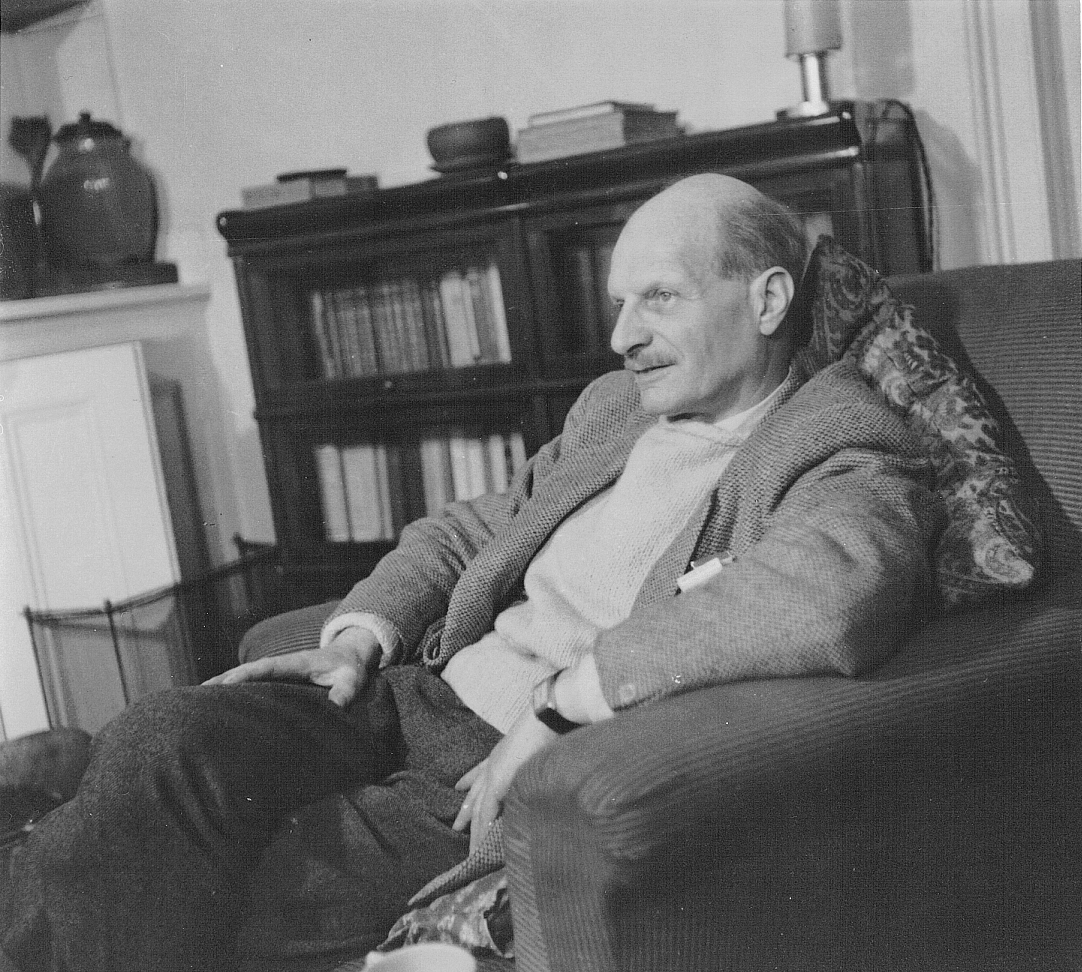
John Rodker, picture taken shortly before his death

John Rodker (18 December 1894 – 6 October 1955) was an English writer, modernist poet, and publisher of modernist writers.

== Biography ==
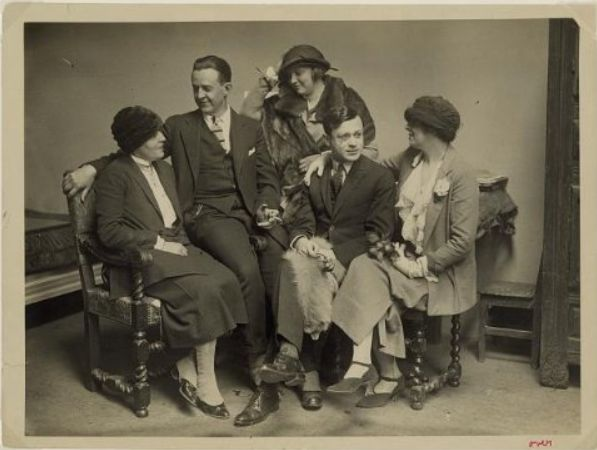
Janet Flanner-Solita Solano Collection/LOC ppmsca.13300. Jane Heap, John Rodker, Martha Dennison, Tristan Tzara, Margaret C. Anderson, ca. 1920s

John Rodker was born on 18 December 1894 in Manchester, into a Jewish immigrant family. The family moved to London while he was still young.

As a young man, he was one of the so-called "Whitechapel Boys", a group including Isaac Rosenberg, Mark Gertler, David Bomberg, Samuel Weinstein and Joseph Lefkowitz (who coined the name in hindsight). From about 1911, when Rosenberg arrived, they began to aspire to literary careers; and in the years before 1914 Rodker was a published essayist and poet, in The New Age of A. R. Orage and elsewhere. Other "Whitechapel Boys" were the painters David Bomberg and Mark Gertler; they all met together at or near the Whitechapel Art Gallery.

During World War I, Rodker was a conscientious objector. He went on the run, sheltering with the poet R. C. Trevelyan, before being arrested in April 1917, imprisoned, and then transferred to the Home Office Work Centre, Princetown, in the former Dartmoor Prison. He describes this in his book Memoirs of Other Fronts.

In 1919 Rodker started the Ovid Press, a small press which lasted about a year. It published T. S. Eliot and Ezra Pound (the first edition of Hugh Selwyn Mauberley) and portfolios of drawings by Wyndham Lewis, Henri Gaudier-Brzeska and Edward Wadsworth. In the opinion of one modern scholar, "the Ovid Press remains his most significant contribution for the originality of the titles he chose and for the place the imprint maintains alongside other private presses of the period."

That same year, Rodker took over from Pound as foreign editor of the New York magazine, The Little Review.

In the 1920s he spent time in Paris on the second edition of James Joyce's Ulysses, at that time subject to censorship, and on French translations of Joyce. He then set up the Casanova Society, for limited editions. He continued in publishing, on occult subjects under the imprint "J. Rodker" also, until a bankruptcy in 1932, when (along with other such ventures such as the Fanfrolico Press) his business folded in the Depression. He was included in the 1930 Faber and Faber collection Our Exagmination Round His Factification for Incamination of Work in Progress of Joyceans.

For a period he dropped publishing, concentrating on translation from French literature, and agency work for Preslit, the Soviet overseas literature organ. At this time too he apparently abandoned literary ambitions for himself. In 1937, the centennial of the death of Aleksandr Pushkin, he set up the Pushkin Press, another small press, publishing Oliver Elton's English version of Eugene Onegin and a trickle of other books.

The Imago Publishing Company was a separate, more substantial venture, set up after Sigmund Freud arrived in London in 1938. The stocks of Freud's works left when he fled Vienna and the Nazis had been destroyed; Rodker with Anna Freud worked to publish a complete edition. This was done over a dozen years, being finished in 1952. Imago was wound up in 1961.

Rodker was fluent in French, writing regularly for a French literary magazine, and was posthumously awarded the Légion d'Honneur by the government of France.

== Personal life ==
John Rodker's father, David, joined the mass exodus of Jews from what is now Poland to escape the pogroms of the 1880s, moving to England, where, like a number of his family members, he worked as a corset-maker. As far as we know, all the Rodkers in the world are related – the name seems to have been invented for (or by) just this one family. This surname appears to be a toponymic surname based on the town of Rodka, now in Romania and renamed to Rădăuți. David married Leah Jacobson; their children were John and Peter.

John's younger brother Peter, who used the surname Roker (without the "d"), served for five years during World War I and married Helen Scott. He was institutionalized for mental illness from 1934 until his death in 1973.

John Rodker married three times. He and his first wife, the writer Mary Butts (1890–1937), married in May 1918. He already had a daughter, Joan (1915–2010), from an earlier relationship with the dancer, Sonia Cohen (1885–1979). His daughter by Mary Butts was Camilla (1920–2007), who married Henry Israel.

The second marriage was to Barbara McKenzie-Smith (1902–1996), a painter, resulting in a son, John Paul (born in 1937), whose surname was changed to Morrison when his mother, after their divorce, married E.A. Morrison III. Moura Budberg was John Paul's godmother.

The third marriage was to Marianne Rais (died 1984), a Paris bookseller and daughter of his translator Ludmila Savitzky.

Joan Rodker's son, Ernest Rodker (1937–2025), by the actor Gerard Heinz, was a post-World War II conscientious objector, a founder member of the Committee of 100 and serves as the British spokesperson for Mordechai Vanunu and became a founding member of the Battersea Power Station Community Group.

== Works ==
=== Imago publishing company (1939-60) ===
- Sigmund Freud, The complete works of. ‘A serious venture’ (1894-1955)

=== Published by Rodker's Ovid Press ===
- John Rodker, Poems (1914)
- Henri Gaudier-Brzeska, Twenty Drawings from the Note-Books of H. Gaudier-Brzeska (1919)
- Ezra Pound, The Fourth Canto (1919)
- Wyndham Lewis, Fifteen Drawings (1920)
- T.S. Eliot, Ara Vus Prec (1920)
- Roger Fry, Catalogue: Paintings Drawings and Etchings by Auguste Renoir (1920)
- Clive Bell, Catalogue: Woodcuts and Drawings by Nicola Galante (1920)
- John Rodker, Hymns (1920)
- Ezra Pound, Hugh Selwyn Mauberley (1920)
- Roald Kristian, A Bestiary (1920)
- Oscar Wilde, To M. B. J. (1920)
- Edward Wadsworth, The Black Country (1920)
- Ezra Pound, Bel Esprit (1922)
- André Germain, Chants dans la Brume (1922)
- James Joyce, Ulysses (1922)
- Le Corbusier, ‘’The City of Tomorrow’’ (1929)

=== Written by John Rodker ===
- Poems (1914) first collection
- Hymns (1920) Ovid Press
- Montagnes Russes (1923) in French translation by Ludmila Savitzky
- Dartmoor (1926) in French translation by Ludmila Savitzky
- The Future of Futurism (1926)
- Adolphe 1920 (1929)
- Collected Poems, 1912–1925 (Hours Press, 1930)
- Memoirs of Other Fronts (1932)
- Poems & Adolphe 1920 (1996) Carcanet Press reissue
