= Isaac Rosenberg =

English poet (1890–1918)

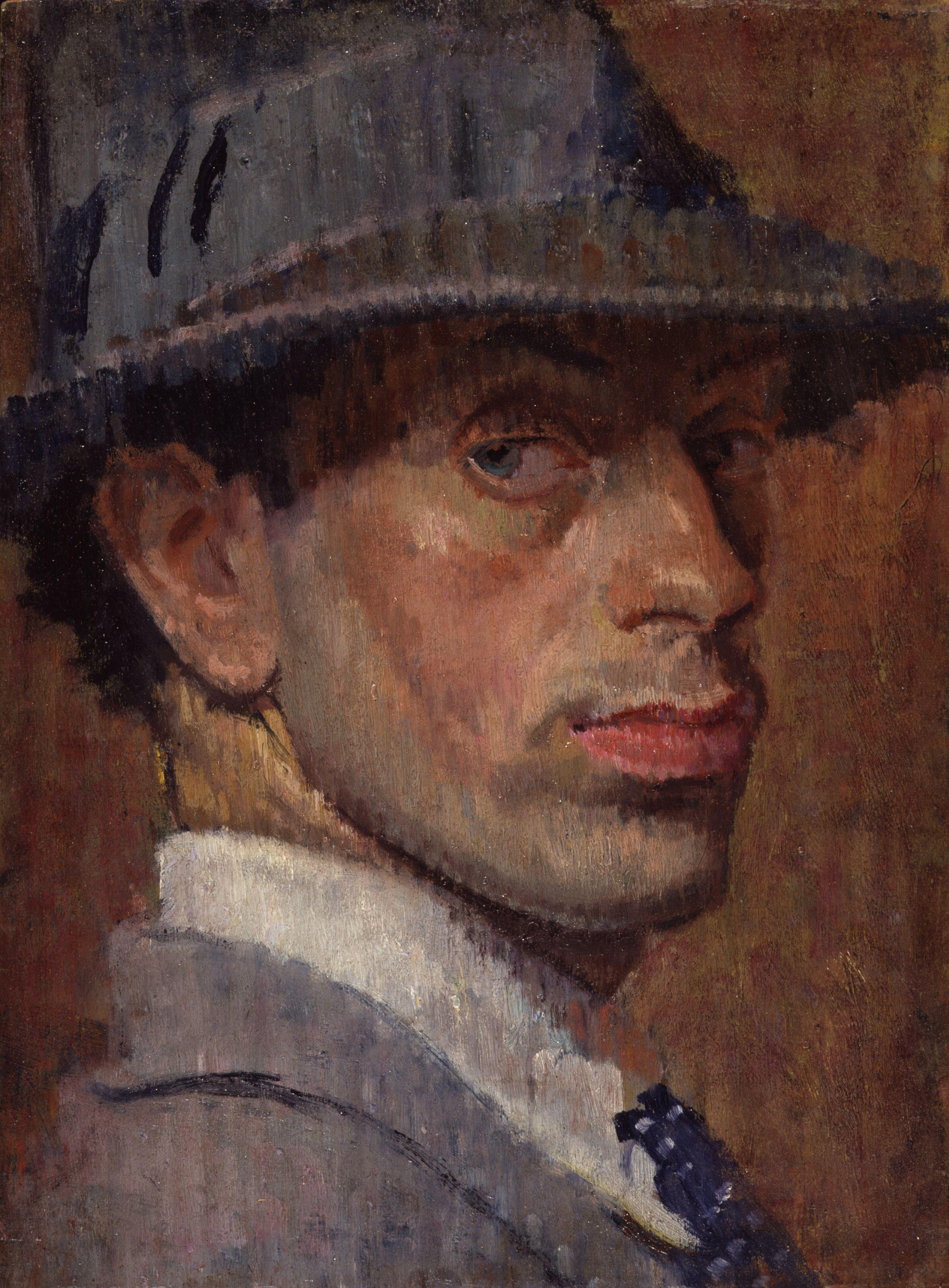
- Self-portrait of Isaac Rosenberg, 1915.
- Born: 25 November 1890; Bristol, England
- Died: 1 April 1918 (aged 27); Fampoux, Pas-de-Calais, France
- Cause of death: Killed in action
- Occupations: Poet, artist

Isaac Rosenberg (25 November 1890 – 1 April 1918) was an English poet and artist. His Poems from the Trenches are recognized as some of the most outstanding poetry written during the First World War.

== Early life ==
Isaac Rosenberg was born in Bristol on 25 November 1890 at 5 Adelaide Place near St. Mary Redcliffe. He was the second of six children and the eldest son (his twin brother died at birth) of his parents, Barnett (formerly Dovber) and Hacha Rosenberg, who were Lithuanian Jewish immigrants to Britain from Dvinsk (now in Latvia). In 1897, the family moved to Stepney, a poor district of the East End of London, and one with a large Jewish community. Isaac Rosenberg attended St. Paul's Primary School at Wellclose Square, St George in the East parish. Later, he went to the Baker Street Board School in Stepney, which had a strong Jewish presence. In 1902, he received a good conduct award and was allowed to take classes at the Arts and Crafts School in Stepney Green. In December 1904, he left the Baker Street School, and in January 1905, started an apprenticeship with Carl Hentschel, an engraver from Fleet Street.

He became interested in both poetry and visual art, and started to attend evening classes at Birkbeck College. He withdrew from his apprenticeship in January 1911. After a chance meeting in March 1911 with Lily Delissa Joseph at the National Gallery, she, her sister Henrietta Löwy and Mrs Herbert Cohen sponsored his application in October 1911 to attend the Slade School of Fine Art at University College, London (UCL). During his time at Slade School, Rosenberg notably studied alongside David Bomberg, Mark Gertler, Stanley Spencer, Paul Nash, Edward Wadsworth, Dora Carrington, William Roberts, and Christopher Nevinson. He was taken up by Laurence Binyon and Edward Marsh, and began to write poetry seriously, but he suffered from ill-health. He published a pamphlet of ten poems, Night and Day, in 1912. He also exhibited paintings at the Whitechapel Gallery in 1914.

Afraid that his chronic bronchitis would worsen, Rosenberg hoped to cure himself by relocating in 1914 to the warmer climate of South Africa, where his sister Mina lived in Cape Town. The Jewish Educational Aid Society of London helped by paying the fare.

After arriving in Cape Town in the end of June 1914, he composed a poem "On Receiving News of the War". While many wrote about war as patriotic sacrifice, Rosenberg was critical of it from the outset. However, feeling better and hoping to find employment as an artist in Britain, Rosenberg returned home in March 1915. He published a second collection of poems, Youth and then after being unable to find a permanent job enlisted in the British Army at the end of October 1915. He asked that half of his pay be sent to his mother.

In a personal letter, Rosenberg described his attitude towards war, "I never joined the army for patriotic reasons. Nothing can justify war. I suppose we must all fight to get the trouble over."

== First World War ==
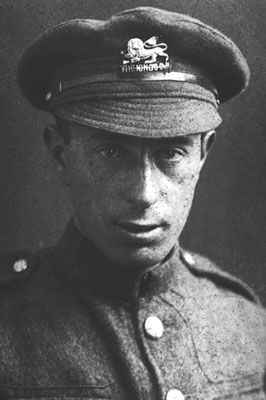
Private Rosenberg, personal service number 22311

Rosenberg was assigned to the 12th Bantam Battalion of the Suffolk Regiment, a bantam being a designation for men under the usual minimum height of 5'3". After apparently declining promotion to lance corporal, Rosenberg was transferred, first, to the South Lancashire Regiment, then to the King's Own Royal Lancaster Regiment (KORL). He was sent with his unit to serve on the Western Front in France, where he arrived on 3 June 1916. He continued to write poetry while serving in the trenches, including "Break of Day in the Trenches", "Returning We Hear the Larks", and "Dead Man's Dump". In December 1916, Poetry Magazine published two of his poems.

In January 1917, Rosenberg reported being sick and his family and friends asked his superiors to remove him from the front lines; he was transferred to the Fortieth Division Works Battalion and started to deliver barbed wire to the trenches. He wrote his poem Dead Man's Dump during this period. In June, he was temporarily assigned to the 229 Field Company, Royal Engineers. In September 1917, he spent ten days in London on leave. After returning to his old unit, he fell sick in October and spent two months in the 51st General Hospital. After release, he was transferred to the 1st Battalion of the King's Own Royal Lancaster Regiment. He applied for a transfer to an all-Jewish battalion, but historians have been unable to trace his application.

On 21 March 1918, the German Army started its Spring Offensive on the Western Front. A week later, Rosenberg sent his last letter with the poem "Through These Pale Cold Days" to England before going to the front lines with reinforcements. Having just finished a night patrol, he was killed on the night of 1 April 1918 with another ten KORL soldiers; there is a dispute as to whether his death occurred at the hands of a sniper or in close combat. In either case, he died in a town called Fampoux, northeast of Arras. He was first buried in a mass grave, but in 1926 the unidentified remains of the six KORL soldiers were individually re-interred at Bailleul Road East Cemetery, Plot V, Saint-Laurent-Blangy, Pas de Calais, France. Rosenberg's gravestone is marked with his name and the words, "Buried near this spot", as well as – "Artist and Poet".

== Legacy ==
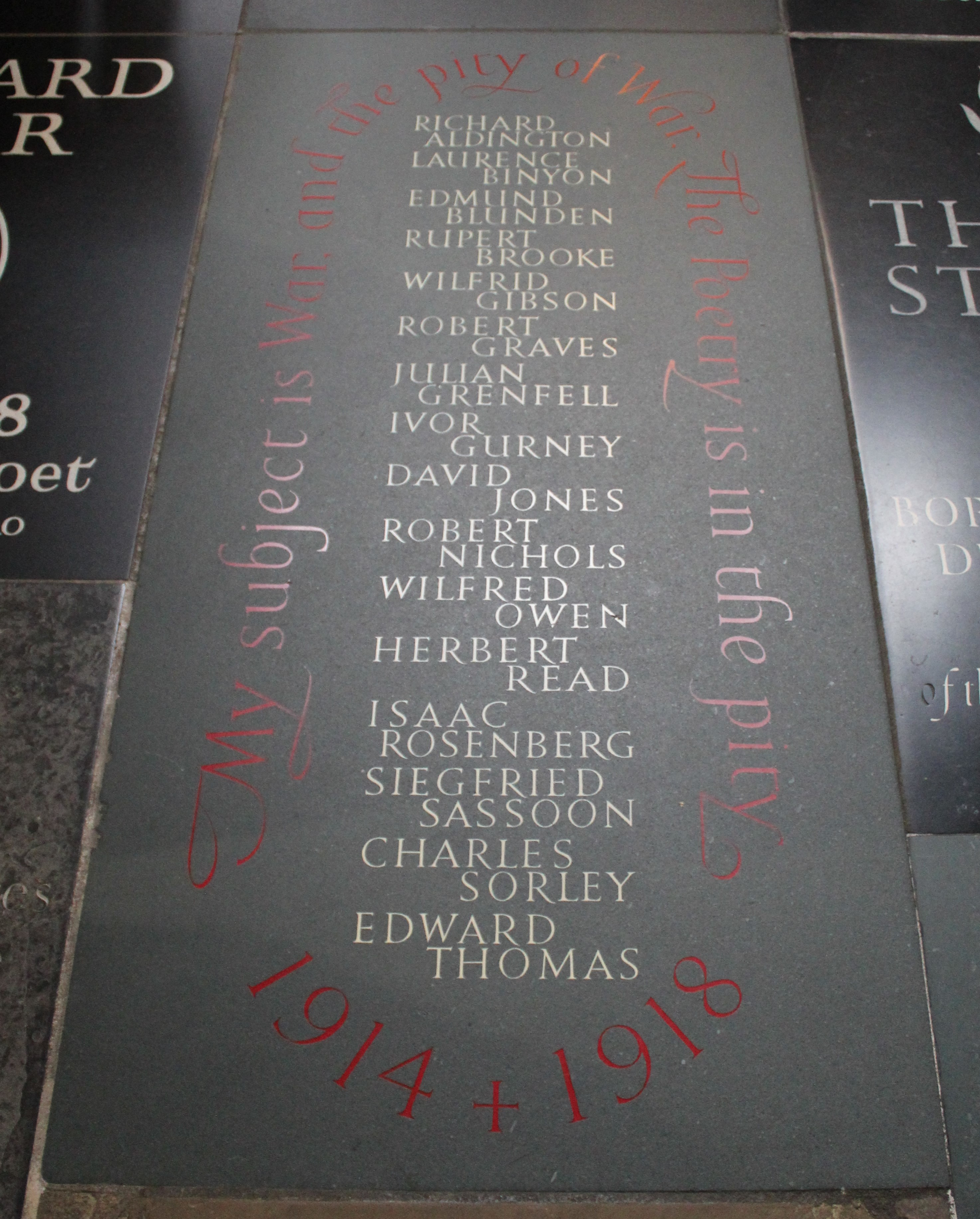
Poets of the First World War memorial, Westminster Abbey

- Self-portraits by Rosenberg hang in the National Portrait Gallery and Tate Britain.
- A commemorative blue plaque to him hangs outside the Whitechapel Gallery, formerly the Whitechapel Library, which was unveiled by Anglo-Jewish writer Emanuel Litvinoff.
- On 11 November 1985, Rosenberg was among 16 Great War poets who were commemorated on a slate stone unveiled in Westminster Abbey's Poet's Corner. The inscription on the stone was taken from Wilfred Owen's "Preface" to his poems and reads: "My subject is War, and the pity of War. The Poetry is in the pity."
- Rosenberg appears in the novel Grosse Fugue by Ian Phillips.
- In The Great War and Modern Memory, Paul Fussell's landmark study of the literature of the First World War, Fussell identifies Rosenberg's "Break of Day in the Trenches" as "the greatest poem of the war."
- BBC Radio 4 broadcast a documentary on his life called "Nobody Told Me To Oil My Boots", written and directed by Neil Cargill with narration by Sir Antony Sher and Simon Schatzberger – re-broadcast by Radio 4Extra.
