= Works related to Federico García Lorca =

A number of works have been based on, have been inspired by, or have alluded to the works of Spanish poet, playwright, and theatre director Federico del Sagrado Corazón de Jesús García Lorca.

== Poetry ==
Poet	Language	Year	Work	Description
Pablo Neruda	Spanish	1934	"Oda a Federico García Lorca" ('Ode to Federico García Lorca')	A poem written before García Lorca's death by his friend Neruda. Frederick Luis Aldama describes Neruda's narrator as exhibiting "more personalized, even stereotypically bourgeois, form of homosexuality" in his words to García Lorca.
Antonio Machado	Spanish	1936	"El crimen fue en Granada" ('The crime was in Granada')	An elegy written almost immediately after García Lorca's murder and published two months later.
Luis Cernuda	Spanish	1937	"A un poeta muerto (F.G.L.)" ("To a Dead Poet (F.G.L.)")	An elegy by a fellow member of the Generation of '27.
Miklós Radnóti	Hungarian	1937	"Federico García Lorca"	A poem.
Óscar Castro Zúñiga	Spanish	1938	"Responso a García Lorca" ('Response to García Lorca')	A poem memorialising García Lorca. Set to music by Ariel Arancibia on the LP Homenaje a Óscar Castro.
Nikos Kavvadias	Greek	1945	"Federico García Lorca"	A poem connecting García Lorca to contemporary events in both Spain and Greece.
Edwin Rolfe	Spanish	1948	"To Federico García Lorca" (Spanish: A Federico García Lorca)	Spanish Civil War poem that characterizes Lorca as having ″recognized your [his] assassins,″ whom Rolfe derides as ″The men with the patent-leather hats and souls of patent-leather.″
Robert Creeley	English	1952	"After Lorca"	A poem.
Allen Ginsberg	English	1955	"A Supermarket in California"	A poem mentioning García Lorca, as well as Walt Whitman.
Bob Kaufman	English	1956–1963	"Lorca"	Three poems about García Lorca, published together in the collection The Ancient Rain. In the poem "The Ancient Rain", Kaufman compares Lorca to Crispus Attucks, a man of African and Native American descent who was the first person killed in the American Revolution.
Bob Kaufman	English	1973–1978	"The Ancient Rain"	Three poems about García Lorca, published together in the collection The Ancient Rain. In the poem "The Ancient Rain", Kaufman compares Lorca to Crispus Attucks, a man of African and Native American descent who was the first person killed in the American Revolution.
Bob Kaufman	English	1973–1978	"[The Night That Lorca Comes]"	Three poems about García Lorca, published together in the collection The Ancient Rain. In the poem "The Ancient Rain", Kaufman compares Lorca to Crispus Attucks, a man of African and Native American descent who was the first person killed in the American Revolution.
Jack Spicer	English	1957	After Lorca	A book of poems containing 33 translations of García Lorca poems, 10 of them in fact by Spicer, as well as an introduction ostensibly by Lorca.
Nikos Engonopoulos	Greek	1957	"News on the death of Spanish poet Federico García Lorca on 19 August 1936 in the ditch of Camino de la Fuente" (Note: Title originally misprinted as "News about the Death of the Spanish Poet Federico Garcia Lorca on the 19th of August 1936 in a Ditch of Caminonte La Fuente") ("Greek: Νέα περί του θανάτου του Ισπανού ποιητού Φεντερίκο Γκαρθία Λόρκα στις 19 Αυγούστου του 1936 µέσα στο χαντάκι του Καµίνο ντε λα φουέντε")	A poem described by Demetra Demetriou as showing "a highly ironic temper".
Jerome Rothenberg; Robert Kelly; Robert Bly	English	1961	"Deep image" form	A poetic form inspired by García Lorca's "deep song".
Yevgeni Yevtushenko	Russian	1969	"When They Murdered Lorca" (Russian: Когда убили Лорку)	An elegy that Lynn Purkey compares to "El crimen fue en Granada", highlighting its political overtones. It portrays Lorca as being akin to Don Quixote—an immortal symbol of one's devotion to his ideals and perpetual struggle for them.
Harold Norse	English	1973	"We Bumped Off Your Friend the Poet"	Inspired by a review of Ian Gibson's Death of Lorca. The poem first appeared in Hotel Nirvana, and later in In the Hub of the Fiery Force, Collected Poems of Harold Norse 1934–2003.
Thanh Thảo	Vietnamese	1985	"The Guitar of Lorca" (Vietnamese: Đàn ghi ta của Lor-ca)	A poem expressing Thanh Thảo's admiration for García Lorca. Set to music by Thanh Tùng.

== Novels ==
Author	Language	Year	Work	Description
Carlos Rojas Vila, Edith Grossman (Translator)	Spanish; English (Translated)	1980, 2013 (Translation)	El Ingenioso Hidalgo y Poeta Federico García Lorca asciende a los infiernos (The Ingenious Gentleman and Poet Federico Garcia Lorca Ascends to Hell)	A novel in which Lorca reviewing the events of his life, his death and possible futures from a spiral of theatres he understands to be hell.
Giannina Braschi	English; Spanish; Spanglish	1998	Yo-Yo Boing!	A novel featuring a dinner party debate among Latin American poets and artists about Lorca's genius compared to other Spanish language poets.
Nicole Krauss	English	2010	Great House	A novel about four owners of a desk allegedly once owned by García Lorca.
Ben Pastor	English	2019	The Horseman's Song	A novel centered on the investigation into Garcia Lorca's murder.

== Musical works ==
Author	Language	Year	Work	Description
Francis Poulenc	(instrumental) (program notes in French)	1943	Violin Sonata (French: Sonate pour violon et piano)	Dedicated to Lorca's memory, and programmatically quoting (in French) the first line of his poem "The Six Strings" (Spanish: Las Seis Cuerdas): "The guitar makes dreams cry" (Note: French: La guitare / fait pleurer les songes; Spanish: La guitarra, / hace llorar a los sueños) at the start of the second movement, Intermezzo.
Francis Poulenc	Spanish	1947	"Trois chansons de F. García Lorca" (English: Three songs of F. García Lorca)	Three vocal pieces. Poulenc expressed frustration at what he felt was an inability to channel García Lorca in both the chansons and the Sonata.
Heitor Villa-Lobos	Spanish	1956	Yerma	Opera based on the original Spanish text of Lorca's play. The opera was premiered at the Santa Fe Opera in 1971.
Camarón de la Isla	Spanish	1979	La Leyenda del Tiempo	Album with lyrics written by or based on works by Lorca.
Silvestre Revueltas	(instrumental)	1937	Homenaje a Federico García Lorca	Three-movement work for chamber orchestra composed shortly after García Lorca's death.
Mario Castelnuovo-Tedesco	Spanish	1951	Romencero Gitano for Mixed Choir and Guitar, Op. 152	Seven-movement piece for soloists, choir, and guitar, based on poems from Poema del Cante Jondo.
Luigi Nono	Spanish	1951–1953	Tre epitaffi per Federico García Lorca (English: Three Epitaphs for García Lorca): "España en el corazón" (English: Spain in Our Hearts); "Y su sangre ya viene cantando" (English: And His Blood Is Already Singing); "La victoria de Guernica" (English: The Victory of Guernica)	The first piece is titled after Pablo Neruda's "España en el corazón".
Luigi Nono	(instrumental)	1954	Il mantello rosso	A ballet based on a play by García Lorca.
George Crumb	Spanish	1965–1969	Madrigals	Four books for soprano and various instruments including piccolo, flute, alto flute, harp, vibraphone, percussion, and contrabass, containing twelve pastoral songs based on short segments of García Lorca's poetry, a plurality drawing from his Diván del Tamarit.
George Crumb	Spanish	1969	Night of the Four Moons	Commissioned by the Philadelphia Chamber Players for alto voice, alto flute (doubling piccolo), banjo, electric violoncello and percussion. Excerpts from García Lorca's poetry are sung by the alto.
George Crumb	Spanish	1970	Ancient Voices of Children	Piece for soprano, boy soprano, and instruments including a musical saw with cello bow and a "chisel piano" (piano with its strings struck by a chisel).
Osvaldo Golijov (composer, libretto translator); David Henry Hwang (librettist)	Spanish	2003	Ainadamar ('Fountain of Tears')	One-act opera about the death of García Lorca, recalled years later by his muse, actress Margarita Xirgu. Casts García Lorca as a breeches role (i.e. played by a woman).
Einojuhani Rautavaara		1972	"Lorca Suite" (Estonian: Lorca-sarja)	Works for a mixed choir with lyrics of García Lorca's various poems.
Einojuhani Rautavaara		1993	"Song of our time" (Spanish: Canción de nuestro tiempo)	Works for a mixed choir with lyrics of García Lorca's various poems.
The Pogues	English	1990	"Lorca's Novena"	A song on the album Hell's Ditch dramatically retelling the story of García Lorca's murder.
Ananda Sukarlan			Two of the "Four Spanish Songs"	Based on the poems "Oda a Salvador Dali" and "Las Seis Cuerdas", premiered by soprano Mariska Setiawan in 2016 accompanied on the piano by the composer.
Dave Soldier	English		Portents of Love	Adapted multiple Lorca poems to country blues songs in idiomatic English in the Kropotkins' album, which features a hand drawing of Lorca's face on the cover.
Reginald Smith Brindle		1975	"Four Poems of Garcia Lorca"	Two songs, the latter for guitar, based on two Lorca poems Adivinanza de la Guitarra and Las Seis Cuerdas
Reginald Smith Brindle		1982	"El Polifemo de Oro"	Two songs, the latter for guitar, based on two Lorca poems Adivinanza de la Guitarra and Las Seis Cuerdas
Dmitri Shostakovich			First two movements of Symphony No. 14	Based around García Lorca poems.
Maurice Ohana		1950s	"Lament for the death of a Bullfighter" (Spanish: Llanto por Ignacio Sánchez Mejías)	García Lorca poem set to music, recorded by the conductor Ataúlfo Argenta.
Marea			"Ciudad de los Gitanos"	A rock version of the poem "Romance de la Guardia Civil española".
Wilhelm Killmayer		1954	Romanzen	Song cycle using five García Lorca poems.
Wolfgang Fortner	German	1957	Bluthochzeit	An opera adapted from García Lorca's Blood Wedding, using a translation by Enrique Beck
Iván Erőd		1960	La doncella, el marinero y el estudiante	A short opera of 15 minutes based almost exclusively on serial techniques, premiered in Innsbruck
Sándor Szokolay		1964	Vérnász	Another opera adapted from Blood Wedding, first produced in Budapest.
Joan Baez	English	1968	Baptism: A Journey Through Our Time	A spoken-word poetry album featuring translated renditions of García Lorca's poems "Gacela of the Dark Death" and "Casida of the Lament".
Ann Loomis Silsbee		1976	"Huit Chants en Brun"	Several of García Lorca's poems set to music.
Tim Buckley	English	1970	Lorca	Experimental album including a song of the same name.
Conrad Susa (composer, co-librettist); Richard Street (co-librettist)		1984	"The Love of Don Perlimplin"	One-act opera based on Lorca's play The Love of Don Perlimplín and Belisa in the Garden. It was commissioned by the Pepsico Summerfare and premiered at the State University of New York at Purchase. The music is published by E.C. Schirmer Music Company. In 1987, Susa completed "Landscapes and Silly Songs" for SATB unaccompanied chorus. The work was commissioned by the Concert Chorale of Houston and is published by E.C. Schirmer Music Company.
Leonard Cohen; Paco de Lucía and others		1986	Poetas En Nueva York (Poets in New York)	Tribute album.
Leonard Cohen	English	1986	"Take This Waltz"	English translation of García Lorca's poem "Pequeño vals vienés". It reached number one on the Spanish single charts. Cohen has described García Lorca as being his idol in his youth, and named his daughter Lorca Cohen for that reason.
Mikis Theodorakis	Greek	1967	Romancero Gitano	Odysseas Elytis's 1945 Greek translation of seven poems from García Lorca's poetry collection of the same name, set to music by Theodorakis. This work was premiered in Rome in 1970 under the same title. In 1981, under commission of the Komische Oper Berlin, the composition was orchestrated as a symphonic work entitled Lorca. In the mid-1990s, Theodorakis rearranged the work as an instrumental piece for guitar and symphony orchestra.
Zülfü Livaneli	Turkish	1986	"Atlı"	Song from the album Zor Yıllar, using a Turkish translation of Lorca's "Canción del Jinete" by Melih Cevdet Anday and Sabahattin Eyüboğlu.
Ben Sidran	(instrumental)	1998	The Concert for García Lorca	Performed on piano at García Lorca's home, Huerta de San Vicente, on the 100th anniversary of his birth.
Geoffrey Gordon	(instrumental)	2000	Lorca Musica per cello solo	Piece using themes from Gordon's 1995 three-act ballet The House of Bernarda Alba, for American cellist Elizabeth Morrow. The work was recorded on Morrow's Soliloquy CD on the Centaur label and was featured at the 2000 World Cello Congress. Three suites from the ballet, for chamber orchestra, have also been extracted from the ballet score by the composer.
The Clash	English	1979	"Spanish Bombs"	Song from the album London Calling, referencing García Lorca.
José María Gallardo Del Rey		2003	Lorca Suite	Suite in tribute to the poet. Taking Lorca's folksong compilations Canciones Españolas Antiguas as his starting point, Gallardo Del Rey incorporates new harmonisations and freely composed link passages that fuse classical and flamenco techniques.
Joan Albert Amargós	(instrumental)		Homenatje a Lorca	Piece for alto saxophone and piano. Its three movements are based on three Lorca poems: "Los cuatro muleros, Zorongo, and Anda jaleo".
Thanasis Papakonstantinou	Greek		Άυπνη Πόλη	Based partly on Lorca's "Poeta en Nueva York", translated to Greek by Maria Efstathiadi.
Roberto García Morillo		1988–1989	Cantata No. 11 (Homenaje a García Lorca)	
ONAR		2000	Song based on Lorca's poem "La balada del agua del mar". Teresa Salgueiro from Portuguese musical ensemble Madredeus participates reading the poem during the song.	
Tamara Maliukova Sidorenko				Set several of Garcia Lorca's poems to music.
Simon Holt			Ballad of the Black Sorrow	Piece for five solo singers and instrumental ensemble, setting García Lorca's words to music.
Simon Holt			Canciones	Piece for mezzo-soprano and instrumental ensemble, setting García Lorca's words to music
Simon Holt			The Nightingale's to Blame	Opera based on Lorca's Amor de don Perlimplín con Belisa en su jardín.
Laura Veirs	English	2023	The Archers	Song based on García Lorca's poem Before the Dawn.
Edward Lambert	English/Spanish	2015	Opera With A Title	Opera derived from El Publico and Commedia sin titulo
Edward Lambert	English/Spanish	2018	The Cloak & Dagger Affair	Opera from Amor de don Perlimplín con Belisa en su jardín
Edward Lambert	English/Spanish	2017	The Butterfly's Spell	Opera based on Lorca's El maleficio de la mariposa.
Edward Lambert	English	2018	The Parting	Opera based on Lorca's Chimera
Edward Lambert	English	2021	Buster's Trip	Opera based on Lorca's El paseo de Buster Keaton
Edward Lambert	English	2021	In Five Years' Time	Opera based on Lorca's Asi que pasen cinco anos
Gertrud Roberts	English		Lorca	Incidental music (for 2 harpsichords) for a theatrical production of Lorca.

== Theatre, film and television ==
- Federico García Lorca: A Murder in Granada (1976) directed by Humberto López y Guerra and produced by the Swedish Television. In October 1980 The New York Times described the transmission of the film by Spanish Television in June that same year as attracting "one of the largest audiences in the history of Spanish Television".
- Playwright Nilo Cruz wrote the surrealistic drama Lorca in a Green Dress about the life, death, and imagined afterlife of García Lorca. The play was first performed in 2003 at the Oregon Shakespeare Festival. The Cruz play Beauty of the Father (2010) also features Lorca's ghost as a key character.
- British playwright Peter Straughan wrote a play (later adapted as a radio play) based on García Lorca's life, The Ghost of Federico Garcia Lorca Which Can Also Be Used as a Table.
- TVE broadcast a six-hour mini-series based on key episodes on García Lorca's life in 1987. British actor Nickolas Grace played the poet, although he was dubbed by a Spanish actor.
- Rukmavati Ki Haveli (1991) an Indian feature film directed by Govind Nihalani is based on Lorca's The House of Bernarda Alba.
- There is a 1997 film called The Disappearance of Garcia Lorca, also known as Death in Granada, based on a biography by Ian Gibson. The film earned an Imagen Award for best film.
- Miguel Hermoso's La luz prodigiosa (The End of a Mystery) is a Spanish film based on Fernando Macías' novel with the same name, which examines what might have happened if García Lorca had survived his execution at the outset of the Spanish Civil War.
- British Screenwriter Philippa Goslett was inspired by García Lorca's close friendship with Salvador Dalí. The resulting biographical film Little Ashes (2009) depicts the relationship in the 1920s and 1930s between García Lorca, Dalí, and Luis Buñuel.
- American playwright Michael Bradford drama, Olives and Blood, produced by Neighborhood Productions at The HERE Art Center/Theatre, June 2012, focuses on the present day trouble one of the supposed murderers of Lorca.
- Blood Wedding is the first part of a ballet / flamenco film trilogy directed by Carlos Saura and starring Antonio Gades and Cristina Hoyos (1981).
- In a segment of the 2001 animated avant-garde film Waking Life, Timothy Levitch extemporizes on Lorca's poem Sleepless City (Brooklyn Bridge Nocturne).
- Lorca is portrayed by Ángel Ruiz in the Spanish time travel series, El Ministerio del Tiempo (2015–2020).
- Alberto Cortés plays Lorca in La bola negra (2026), directed by Javier Ambrossi and Javier Calvo.
