= Huerta de San Vicente =

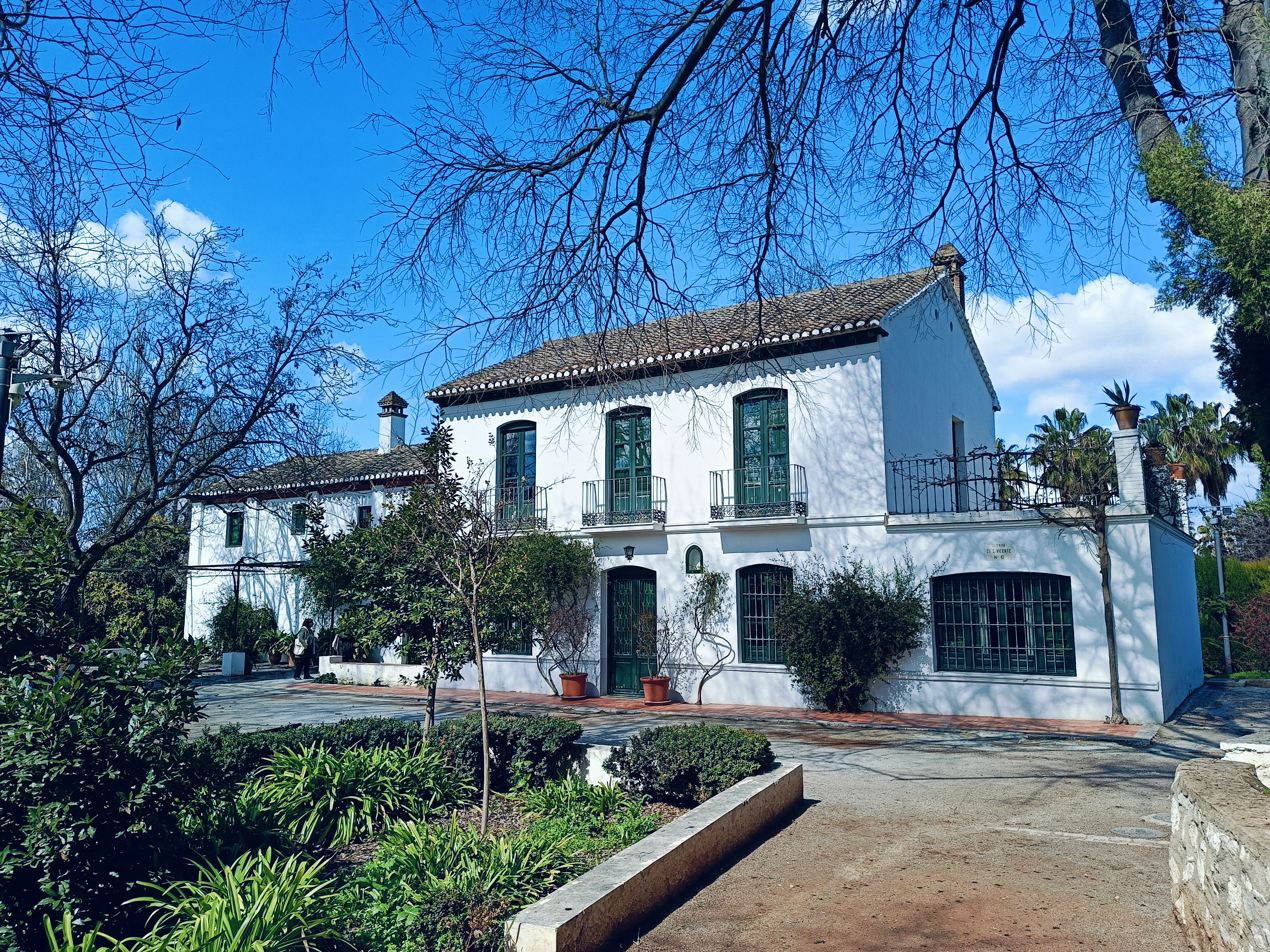
- Casa-Museo Federico García Lorca
- Former name: Huerta de los Mudos
- Established: 10 May 1995
- Location: Granada, Andalusia, Spain
- Coordinates: 37°10′14″N 3°36′34″W
- Type: Art museum

The Casa-Museo Federico García Lorca, better known as Huerta de San Vicente, was the García Lorca family's summer home, from 1926 to 1936.

The house and orchards are now at the heart of Granada's Park Federico García Lorca, which was inaugurated in 1995.

== History ==
The estate was built during the second half of the 19th century, and used to be called "Huerta de los Mudos". Federico García Rodríguez, father of Federico García Lorca, bought the house on 27 May 1925. He changed the name to "Huerta de Vicente" as a tribute to his wife, Vicenta Lorca Romero. The house remains largely unchanged from the time of the Lorca family's residence.

Federico García Lorca wrote some of his most famous works, such as Blood wedding (1932) and Yerma (1934), at the house. He was at the Huerta de San Vicente the days prior to his assassination, before deciding to take refuge at his friend Luis Rosales's home, where he was arrested. After Lorca's murder, the García Lorca family left Spain for the United States in 1941. They retained ownership of the Huerta estate which was maintained by a cousin and by members of staff in their nearly 40-year absence.

== Museum ==
By the 1970s, the urban development of Granada onto the Vega threatened the existence of the house, and its demolition was proposed. The plans were thwarted by Lorca's younger brother and a grouping of intellectuals and artists who argued for the cultural importance of the property. After the end of the dictatorship of Francisco Franco, Lorca's significance as a writer was again widely appreciated. On 6 April 1985, Isabel García Lorca sold the estate to the city of Granada in order to establish a museum dedicated to the poet. The art centre was inaugurated on 10 May 1995.

== See also ==
- Federico García Lorca

== Sources ==
- Gibson, Ian (1990). Federico García Lorca. London, UK: Faber & Faber. ISBN 978-0-571-14224-8. OCLC 1190922956.
- — (1992). Lorca's Granada: A practical guide. London, UK: Faber & Faber. ISBN 978-0-571-16175-1. OCLC 933856575.
