= Thanh Thảo =

Thanh Thảo may refer to:

- Thanh Thảo (singer) (born 1977), Vietnamese singer and actress
- Thanh Thảo (poet) (born 1946), Vietnamese poet and journalist
