= Doña Rosita the Spinster =

Play written by Federico García Lorca

Doña Rosita the Spinster (Spanish: Doña Rosita la soltera) is a period play by the 20th-century Spanish dramatist Federico García Lorca. It is subtitled "or The Language of the Flowers" and described as "a poem of 1900 Granada, divided into various gardens, with scenes of song and dance". It was written in 1935 and first performed in the same year.

"The theme of the play", suggests Federico García Lorca, "is the passage of time" (which Lorca had developed in a different form in his experimental surrealist play When Five Years Pass in 1931). Doña Rosita is a young woman who falls in love with a man who is called to South America to join his parents. He swears to return and Rosita waits, but learns that he has married someone else. The action is set in Granada, Spain in three different years, portraying the bourgeois life of the 1880s and the social modernization and beginning of World War I of the early 1900s. Lorca draws parallels between Doña Rosita's life and these historic periods, beginning with the vitality of her youth, the attainment of maturity, and finally the loss of all hope.

The key moment in the play occurs when a young relative addresses Rosita as Doña Rosita. This form of address signals her change of status.

== Works cited ==
- García Lorca, Federico. 1970. Doña Rosita, the Spinster. In Five Plays: Comedies and Tragi-Comedies. Trans. James Graham-Lujan and Richard L. O'Connell. London: Penguin. ISBN 0-14-018125-3.
- García Lorca, Francisco. 1963. Introduction. In Five Plays: Comedies and Tragi-Comedies. Trans. James Graham-Lujan and Richard L. O'Connell. London: Penguin, 1970. ISBN 0-14-018125-3. p. 9–20.
- Stainton, Leslie. Lorca: a Dream of Life. New York: Farrar, Straus and Giroux, 1999. 393–397.
