= The Billy-Club Puppets =

Play written by Federico García Lorca

The Billy-Club Puppets (Los títeres de cachiporra) is a play for puppet theatre by the twentieth-century Spanish playwright Federico García Lorca. It was written between 1922 and 1925. It is about a beautiful heroine named Rosita who falls in love with a poor boy named Cocoliche, but has to marry Don Cristóbal, a rich old, lazy lump with a big billy club. Meanwhile, there are bar fights, some mean smugglers, and Fígaro and Wearisome discover a deep, dark secret about Don Cristóbal. He gave it the subtitle "Tragi-comedy of Don Cristóbal and Miss Rosita: A Guignolesque farce in six scenes and an announcement." Don Cristóbal is a kind of Punch character (which itself was based on Pulcinella), who also appears in García Lorca's other, later puppet play, The Puppet Play of Don Cristóbal (written in 1931).

== Works cited ==
- García Lorca, Federico. 1970. The Billy-Club Puppets. In Five Plays: Comedies and Tragi-Comedies. Trans. James Graham-Lujan and Richard L. O'Connell. London: Penguin. ISBN 0-14-018125-3. p. 21-60.
- García Lorca, Francisco. 1963. Introduction. In Five Plays: Comedies and Tragi-Comedies by Federico García Lorca. Trans. James Graham-Lujan and Richard L. O'Connell. London: Penguin, 1970. ISBN 0-14-018125-3. p. 9-20.
