= Poet in New York =

Book of poems by Federico García Lorca

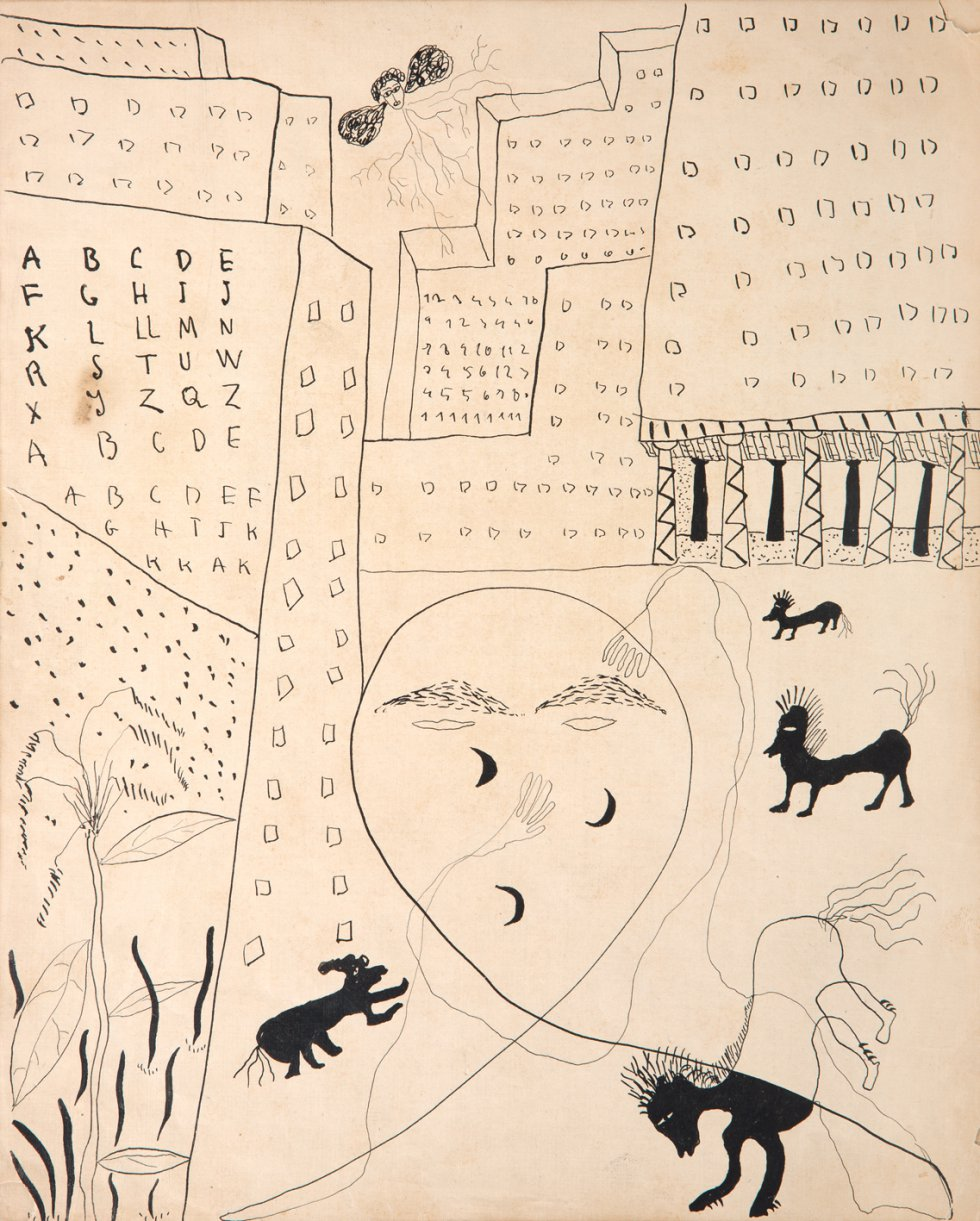
Lorca's self-portrait for Poet in New York

Poet in New York (in Spanish, Poeta en Nueva York) is one of the most important works of the Spanish author Federico García Lorca. The book of poems was composed in 1929 and 1930 during the poet's residency at Columbia University. During his stay, the stock market crashed in October 1929, an event which profoundly affected his poetic vision.

In 1929, García Lorca left Spain to attend conferences in the United States and Cuba, however this may have been a pretext for Lorca's desire to leave his homeland, which he found suffocating and oppressive. Due to the end of a romantic affair with sculptor Emilio Aladrén Perojo and internal conflict over his sexuality, Lorca suffered a deep depression. He lived in New York for around nine months, from June 25, 1929 to March 4, 1930, after which time he departed to Cuba where he stayed for three months.

Lorca was deeply affected by his view of American society, and from the beginning of his stay he felt a profound aversion to capitalism and modern industrial society, as well as to the dismissive treatment of African Americans. For Lorca, Poet In New York was a scream of horror against injustice and discrimination, dehumanization and human alienation. At the same time, it reclaimed a new human dimension where liberty and justice, love and beauty rule.

After his stay in New York, Lorca traveled to Cuba, where he wrote one of the poems included in the book Son de negros en Cuba before returning to Spain. The book was not published until 1940, after Lorca's death. Due to Franco's dictatorship, it was originally released in Mexico and the United States (translated by Rolfe Humphries).

== See also ==
- The Public (play)
- Take This Waltz (song)
