= The Puppet Play of Don Cristóbal =

Play written by Federico García Lorca

The Puppet Play of Don Cristóbal (Retablillo de Don Cristóbal) is a play for puppet theatre by the twentieth-century Spanish dramatist Federico García Lorca. It was written in 1931 and was first performed on 11 May 1935 at the Book Fair in Madrid, in a performance in which Lorca operated the puppets himself. Don Cristóbal is a kind of Punch character (which itself was based on Pulcinella), who also appears in García Lorca's earlier puppet play, The Billy-Club Puppets (written in 1931).

Known as "A Farce of Puppets" the one-act Spanish puppet play was written by Federico García Lorca. Don Cristóbal and the other puppets are Punch and Judy Style puppets. The play is a Tragic Comedy involving adultery, crude humor, and violent actions. It was the only Punch and Judy Style puppet piece Lorca would write. The play itself plays off the theme rich old man buys young beautiful wife and the consequences that ensue.

== Production history ==
Lorca wrote the play in 1931 but it did not have its first production until 1935, which he directed, one year before his assassination. Around this time he became director for the touring company La Barraca.

== Characters ==
- The Director - The Director of the show. He's always correcting The Poet how the play should run.
- The Poet - Author of the Play, telling the audience how he thinks the play should run.
- Don Cristóbal - An old doctor, after receiving funds from the Patient, he seeks out Rosita to be his bride, unaware of Rosita’s scandalous nature.
- Patient -Don Cristóbal's patient that he receives the funds for his marriage proposal to Rosita. He complains about having a sore neck.
- Mother of Doña Rosita - Mother of Rosita, wants to marry off her daughter to anyone who would have her...for a price.
- Rosita - A young woman with many young suitors and lovers. Marries Don Cristóbal, but does not change her ways.

== Plot synopsis ==
The play begins with a prologue within a prologue with a voice addressing the audience as "Ladies and Gentlemen". The voice preaches that the author has written the piece knowing the audience would accept the delight and vulgarity of the puppet show they are about to witness. The Poet enters, and the Voice continues his monologue, telling a child to shut up, telling the audience how quiet they must be during the performance and that he is going to go eat a piece of bread and then iron the company’s costumes. As he begins to tell how roses grow he lowers himself down and his other hand becomes the Director. He tells this puppeteer to put a sock in it and where he should have ended his dialogue. The Poet and the Director begin to quarrel about how the play should be written. The Poet believes Don Cristóbal is good, while the Director says that he is bad. During the fight, there are threats and breaking of the fourth wall, and each of them calls out to the other characters to get ready to being the play. Rosita says she’s putting on her shoes, while Cristóbal says he’ll be out once he has finished peeing. The Director tells him he is a doctor and has to get married. This is where the play truly begins when the Patient Enters. He tells Cristóbal of a pain in his neck and Cristóbal feels the only way to cure him is by ripping off his head. He seizes the Patient and tries to remove his head, and when he fails, he exits and reenters with a stick. He threatens the Patient demanding money and the Patient tells Cristóbal all the places he has money on his person, a questionable place up his behind being one of them, and Cristóbal begins to beat him multiple times with the stick. Cristóbal beats him to death and the Patient falls with a thud. The Director reenters and asks Cristóbal if he had any money, and with a positive answer tells Cristóbal he can now get married. The Mother enters, and with a side tells of her daughter and how she needs to find a man to marry. Cristóbal approaches her and tells her he is a gentlemen looking to get married. They negotiate and Mother trades her daughter off to Cristóbal for a Mule. When Mother tells Cristóbal where he can find Rosita, Rosita has a brief monologue depicting her adventures and desires with all of her lovers. During banter between Mother and Cristóbal, he informs her everyone he meets must tremble before him, and he demands she summon Rosita. Cristóbal and Rosita meet, Mother asks him to take care of her, and Cristóbal alls out for the priest with bells ringing out.

The Poet reenters and addresses the audience how the characters could and should play out but the Director keeps them on a narrow path. The Director reenters and the Poet quickly fibs about what he had just spoken aloud. The Director threatens him and Cristóbal and Rosita reenter. He begins to tell her what he plans to do to her in his drunken state, and Rosita has the idea for him to take a nap. When Cristóbal falls asleep a man enters and begins to kiss Rosita. Cristóbal wakes up to the sounds of kissing and the man quickly disappears. Rosita makes an excuse and tells him to go take another nap. This pattern continues with the Poet and the recently deceased Patient entering, kissing Rosita, Cristóbal waking up, and Rosita lying about what he had heard. The Mother enters and tells Rosita the doctor is here and Rosita says she has fallen and ill and the women demand Cristóbal to give them his money. They exit and the Director enters telling Cristóbal that Dona Rosita is not only ill, but she is giving birth. Cristóbal asks who is the father, and is informed she’s already had four children. He threatens her aloud and confronts Mother. He Strikes her when she says he is the father. The Director tells them both she is having the fifth and Cristóbal asks who the father is again, striking her every time she says it’s his. He eventually beats her to death, addressing the murder and boasting he will find out who the father is, but Mother arises and continues to say the baby is Cristóbal’s child. Cristóbal continues to beat her until the Director says enough and addressees the audience. The play ends with the Director telling the audience that we only accept the vulgarity and content of the show because its puppets who are delivering the dialogue instead of real actors and Don Cristóbal is a character the ancient spirit of theatre survives.

== Works cited ==
- Edwards, Gwynne. 1980. Lorca: The Theatre Beneath the Sand. London and New York: Marion Boyars. ISBN 0-7145-2771-8.
- García Lorca, Francisco. 1963. Introduction. In Five Plays: Comedies and Tragi-Comedies by Federico García Lorca. Trans. James Graham-Lujan and Richard L. O'Connell. London: Penguin, 1970. ISBN 0-14-018125-3. p. 9-20.
- Elman, Linda (March 2004). "Linking Life and Lyric: The Federico García Lorca Course". Hispania. 87 (1): 143–149. doi:10.2307/20063016. JSTOR 20063016.
