= Romancero gitano =

1928 poetry collection by Federico García Lorca

Gypsy Ballads
- by Federico García Lorca
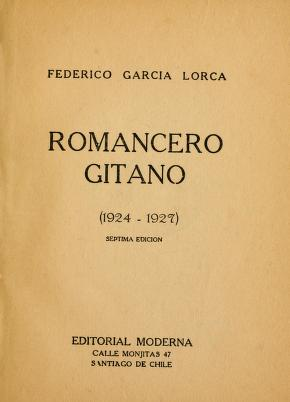
- 1924-1927 edition
- Original title: Romancero gitano
- Country: Spain
- Language: Spanish
- Genre: Poetry
- Publication date: 1928
- Preceded by: Canciones
- Followed by: Odes

The Romancero gitano (often translated into English as Gypsy Ballads) is a poetry collection by Spanish writer Federico García Lorca. First published in 1928, it is composed of eighteen romances with subjects like the night, death, the sky, and the moon. All of the poems deal with the Romani people and their culture, but only as a theme used to carry the larger message that the poet was trying to convey.

The Romancero gitano was instantly popular and remains García Lorca's best known book of poetry. It was a highly stylised imitation of the ballads and poems that were still being told throughout the Spanish countryside. García Lorca himself described the work as a "carved altar piece" of Andalusia with "gypsies, horses, archangels, planets, its Jewish and Roman breezes, rivers, crimes, the everyday touch of the smuggler and the celestial note of the naked children of Córdoba. A book that hardly expresses visible Andalusia at all, but where the hidden Andalusia trembles". The book brought him fame across Spain and the Hispanic world; it would only be much later in his life that he gained notability as a playwright.

For the rest of his life, the writer would search for the elements of Andalusian culture, trying to find its essence without resorting to the "picturesque" or the clichéd use of "local colour".

== Notable translations ==
- Gypsy Ballads: A Version of the Romancero gitano of Federico García Lorca, Translated by Michael Hartnett. Goldsmith Press 1973
- Gypsy Ballads, Bilingual edition translated by Jane Duran and Gloria García Lorca. Enitharmon Press 2016
