= Juan Ramírez de Lucas =

Spanish writer

- Born: 1917; Albacete, Spain
- Died: 20 July 2010 (aged 92–93); Madrid, Spain
- Occupation: Writer

Juan Ramírez de Lucas (1917–2010) was a Spanish writer and journalist, who, after his death in 2010, was revealed to have been the lover of Spanish poet and playwright Federico García Lorca. It was for Ramírez that the poet wrote his last collection, Sonetos de amor oscuro (Sonnets of Dark Love), completed in 1936 shortly before his assassination by a Nationalist militia.

== Early life ==
Ramírez was born in 1917 in Albacete in the Spanish province of Castilla–La Mancha into a "traditional provincial family" with ten children. His father was a medical examiner and sent Ramírez to Madrid at the age of 18 to study civil administration. Ramírez also aspired to write.

== Federico García Lorca ==
The couple met in Madrid, during the Second Spanish Republic. Ramírez, 19-years-old, was introduced to García Lorca, 38-years-old at the time, by theater director Pura Maórtua de Ucelay at the Club Teatral Anfistora. The Anfistora was an avant-garde theater collaboration between García Lorca and Ucelay. Ramírez performed in several productions Lorca staged at Anfistora, and the two fell in love during rehearsals for the play Así que pasen cinco años, which Lorca was directing. Their relationship continued during the year leading up to the poet's death. Tall and blond, he was nicknamed "el rubio de Albacete" (the blond from Albacete) by Lorca, and Ramírez was the youth he called "aquel rubio de Albacete" in the poem below:

Aquel rubio de Albacete
vino, madre, y me miró.
¡No lo puedo mirar yo!

Aquel rubio de los trigos
hijo de la verde aurora,
alto, sólo y sin amigos
pisó mi calle a deshora.
La noche se tiñe y dora
de un delicado fulgor
¡No lo puedo mirar yo!

Aquel lindo de cintura
sentí galán sin...
sembró por mi noche obscura
su amarillo jazminero
tanto me quiere y le quiero
que mis ojos se llevó.
¡No lo puedo mirar yo!

Aquel joven de la Mancha
vino, madre, y me miró.
¡No lo puedo mirar yo!

Translation:

That blond from Albacete
came, mother, and looked at me.
I can't look at him!

That blond one with the wheat
son of the green aurora,
tall, alone and without friends
stepped on my street at an inconvenient time.
The night is stained and brown
with a delicate glow
I can't look at him!

That one cute at the waist
I felt dashing without...
sowed through my dark night
his yellow jasmine
he loves me so and I so love him
that my eyes are taken away.
I can't look at him!

That young man from la Mancha
came, Mother, and looked at me.
I can't look at him!

In the summer of 1936, understanding that his life was in danger, García Lorca determined to emigrate to Mexico. He and Ramírez planned to travel together, but Ramírez, being 19, needed his parents' permission to leave the country. They separated in July 1936 at Madrid's Atocha Station, Ramírez bound for this family's home in Albacete and García Lorca for Granada to say farewell to his family. Ramírez's family refused him permission, and, while in Granada, García Lorca was seized and shot by a Nationalist militia. Ramírez received a last letter from the poet on 18 July 1936, after García Lorca had been killed.

Ramírez did not disclose his relationship with García Lorca until near his death, when he gave his sister a box of letters and mementoes that confirmed his relationship with the poet and identifying him as the subject of Sonetos de amor oscuro.

== Later career ==
A specialist in the Spanish Arte popular (folk art) movement, Ramírez de Lucas wrote reviews for such periodicals as Arquitectura in Madrid and penned architecture criticism for the newspapers ABC (Madrid) and Arte y Cemento (Bilbao). After this death, Julia Sáez-Angulo, vice president of the Association of Art Critics, cited him as both a pioneer in architecture criticism and a great folk art expert.

== Depictions in popular culture ==
The 2012 novel Los amores oscuros by Manuel Francisco Reina is a fictionalized imagining of the poet's relationship with Ramírez.

London playwright Nicholas de Jongh retold García Lorca and Ramírez's story in The Unquiet Grave of Garcia Lorca, which was directed by Hamish MacDougall in 2014. De Jongh cited the homophobia and hate against García Lorca and Ramírez as part of his motivation for developing the work, citing as examples the fascist nickname for García Lorca "el maricón de la pajarita" (the queer in the bowtie) and that: "They loathed him because they believed, as one of them (Ramón Ruiz Alonso) said, Lorca 'had done more damage with his pen than many men did with their guns.'"

Ramírez's relationship with García Lorca was the inspiration for Lorca Madly in Love, a flamenco performance at Carnegie Hall in November 2015. The performance was choreographed by and featured David Morales and also featured Spanish flamenco singer Miguel Poveda.

== See also ==
- Museo de Arte Popular

== Bibliography ==
- Manuel Francisco Reina, Los amores oscuros, 2012, Temas de Hoy, España
- Juan Ramírez de Lucas, Recuerdos: Breve historia de un amor, edited by Christopher Maurer and Víctor Fernández, 2026, Seix Barral, España
