= Víznar =

- Town
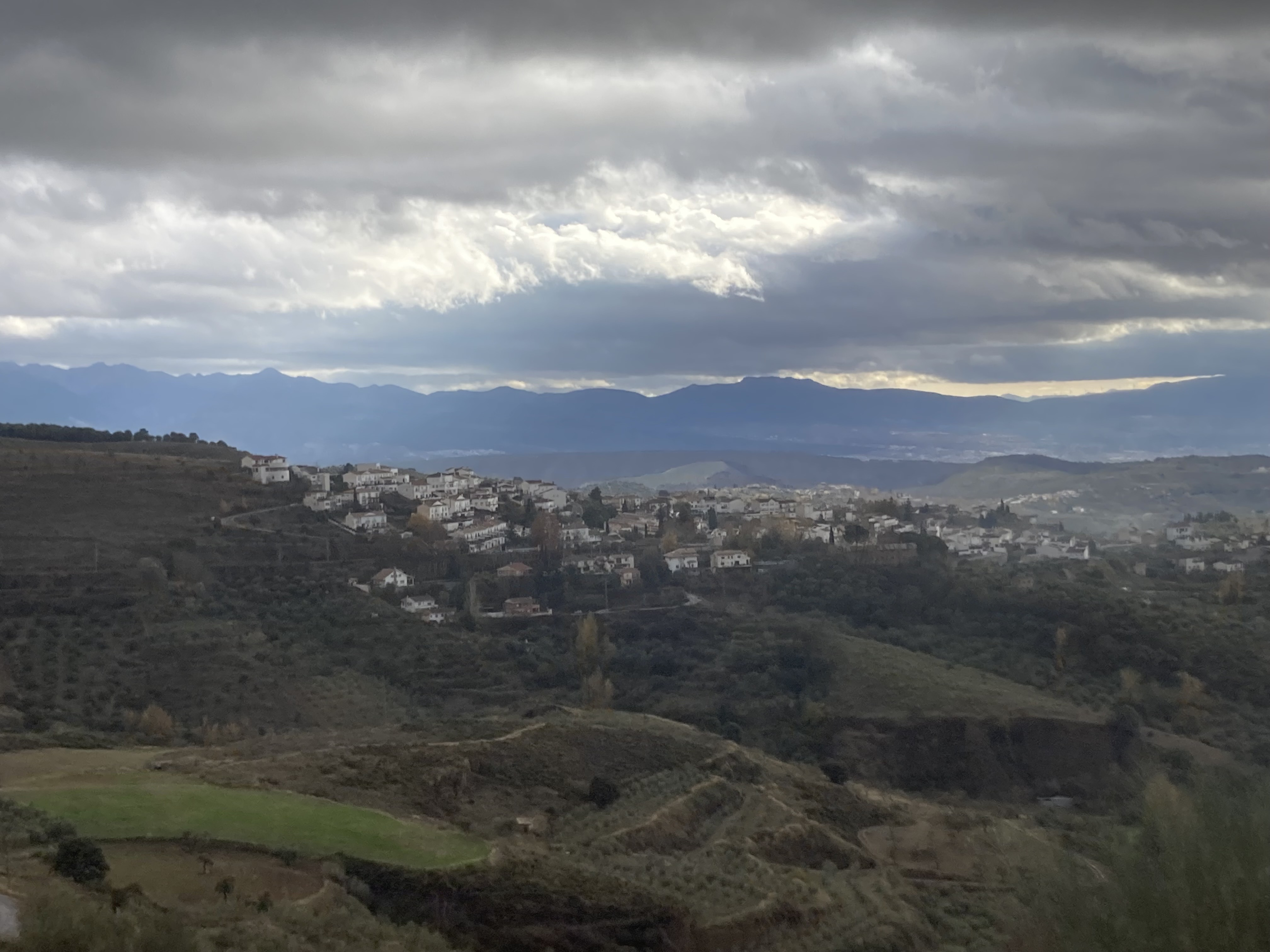

- Flag Coat of arms

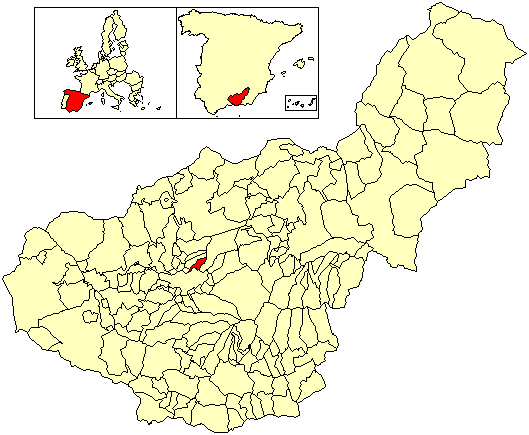
- Location of Víznar
- Coordinates: 37°07′N 03°35′W
- Country: Spain
- Province: Granada
- Municipality: Víznar

Area
  - Total: 13 km^{2} (5.0 sq mi)
- Elevation: 1,050 m (3,440 ft)

Population (2025-01-01)
  - Total: 1,006
  - Density: 77/km^{2} (200/sq mi)
- Time zone: UTC+1 (CET)
  - Summer (DST): UTC+2 (CEST)

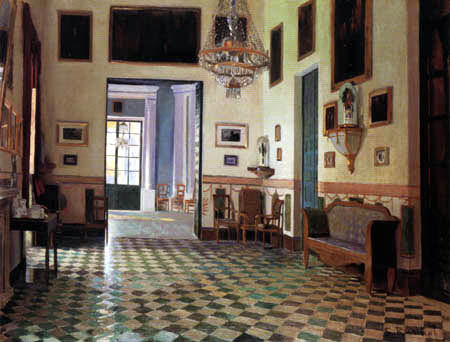
Interior of the Viznar Palace, by Santiago Rusiñol

Víznar is a municipality located in the province of Granada, Spain, only a few miles from the city of Granada itself. According to the 2005 census (INE), the town has a population of 789 inhabitants.

Site of the exquisite neo-classical Summer palace of an 18th-century archbishop of Granada, Don Juan Manuel Moscoso y Peralta, (1723–1811), an important figure in the history of Peru, the near-vicinity of Víznar was the place of execution, in 1936, of the noted Spanish poet, Federico García Lorca, at the beginning of the Spanish Civil War.

In the Víznar Ravine, various excavation processes have been carried out which have made it possible to find, as of 2025, 166 corpses and identify 7 civilian victims of the Civil War.

== See also ==
- List of municipalities in Granada
