= Emilio Aladrén Perojo =

Spanish sculptor (1906–1944)

Emilio Aladrén Perojo (Madrid, 1906–1944) was a Spanish sculptor.

== Life ==
He was born in 1906 in Madrid, the son of a Zaragozan soldier and a Russian immigrant. In 1922 he began to attend the Royal Academy of Fine Arts of San Fernando in Madrid, where he became a sculptor. After his graduation he participated in diverse art exhibitions and competitions, getting the third medal in the National Fine Arts Competition of 1934. He obtained the majority of his achievements during the dictatorship of Francisco Franco, making various bronze busts of officials in the regime.

Aladrén is also well known for his relationship with the poet Federico Garcia Lorca between 1925 and 1927. Their parting sent the poet into a depression that caused him to leave to New York for a change in atmosphere, which motivated his famous work of poetry, Poet in New York.
