= Thanh Thảo (poet) =

Vietnamese poet and journalist

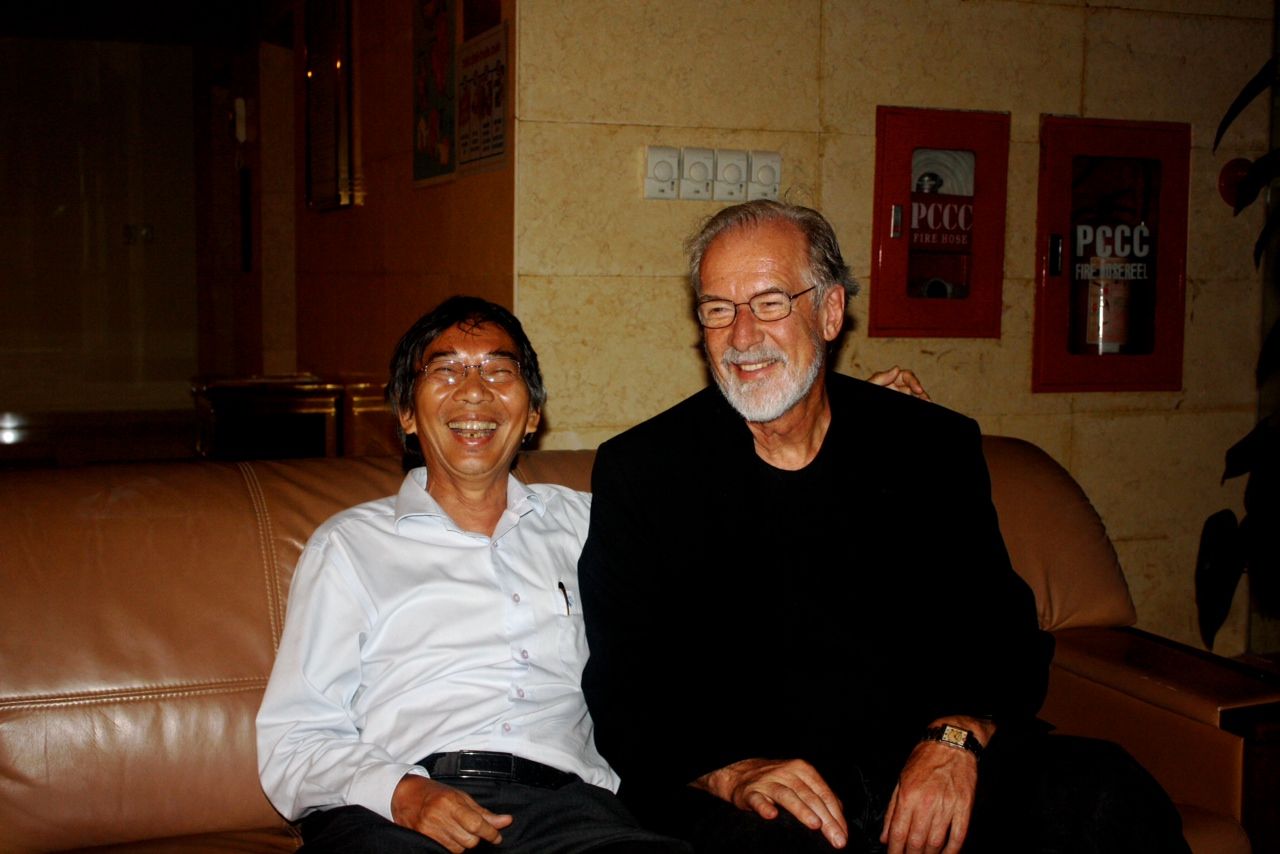
Thanh Thảo with Paul Hoover at his hometown in Quảng Ngãi, May 2011

Thanh Thảo (Mộ Đức, Quảng Ngãi Province, 1946) is a Vietnamese poet and journalist.

Thanh Thao grew up in Hanoi, took a degree in literature from Hanoi University, and now lives once more in Quảng Ngãi. He was a correspondent for Vietnamese Army Radio in the Southern campaign of the Vietnam War with the United States. He became famous for his long antiwar poem A Soldier Speaks of His Generation, which was sent directly from the heat of battle to his hometown newspaper in the North.

He is a member of the Vietnamese Writers Association and poetry committee and president of its branch in Quảng Ngãi Province. Even though this position usually comes with Communist Party membership, he is not a member, the first such exception in history. Winner of the National Prize for a Lifetime Contribution to Literature in 2001 and three Vietnamese National Book Awards for The Footprints Passing a Meadow in 1979, the book-length poems The Waves of the Sun in 1996 and Farm Footing in 2012 (All published Association Writers' Publisher). Thanh Thảo is one of the most popular contemporary poets in Vietnam.

An admirer of the Russian poets Boris Pasternak and Sergei Yesenin and the Spanish poet Federico García Lorca for the richness of their knowledge, Thanh Thảo grafted the early modernist style of western lyric to his own. His most well-known works include individual poems published in the 1970s and the collections The Rubik's Cube, 1985, Men Going Forward to the Sea (Association Writers' Publisher 1984, new edition 1986, 1999, 2003). Rich in thought and complicated in theme, Thanh Thảo's poems also display a sense of humor. Thanh Thảo has published twenty eight poetry collections and literary works.

Commenting on 12+3 Paul Hoover said:

The poetry of Thanh Thao deals beautifully in the mystery of presence and absence, of past and present: "I come again / to the well / its perfectly rounded sky / and the tree's oblique shadow / like my mother's shape." He writes with great intensity and longing about his experience of childhood, the war with the United States, and the passing of time. A boat floats to an empty space; stars crowd into a puddle of water. But despite all the terror and exhaustion of life, there is always the promise of homecoming and restoration, as leaf after leaf is added to its branch. His poetry is a lesson to me of the eternal and existential condition of life beyond the supposed limits language and culture. We are always getting lost, and poetry, like love, is a light in that darkness.

Poetry of Thanh Thảo has been appeared in many magazines and anthologies in Vietnamese and other languages such as Russian, French, English and Spanish. Thanh Thao was considered "the King of epic poem" thanks to he has been published seven poem book length. His poems are a major contribution to the Vietnamese contemporary poetry anthology, Black Dog Black Night (Milkweed Editions, USA, 2008 -named "The Best Anthology of Year" by Coldfront magazine, 2008).
