= When Five Years Pass =

Theatrical play by Federico García Lorca

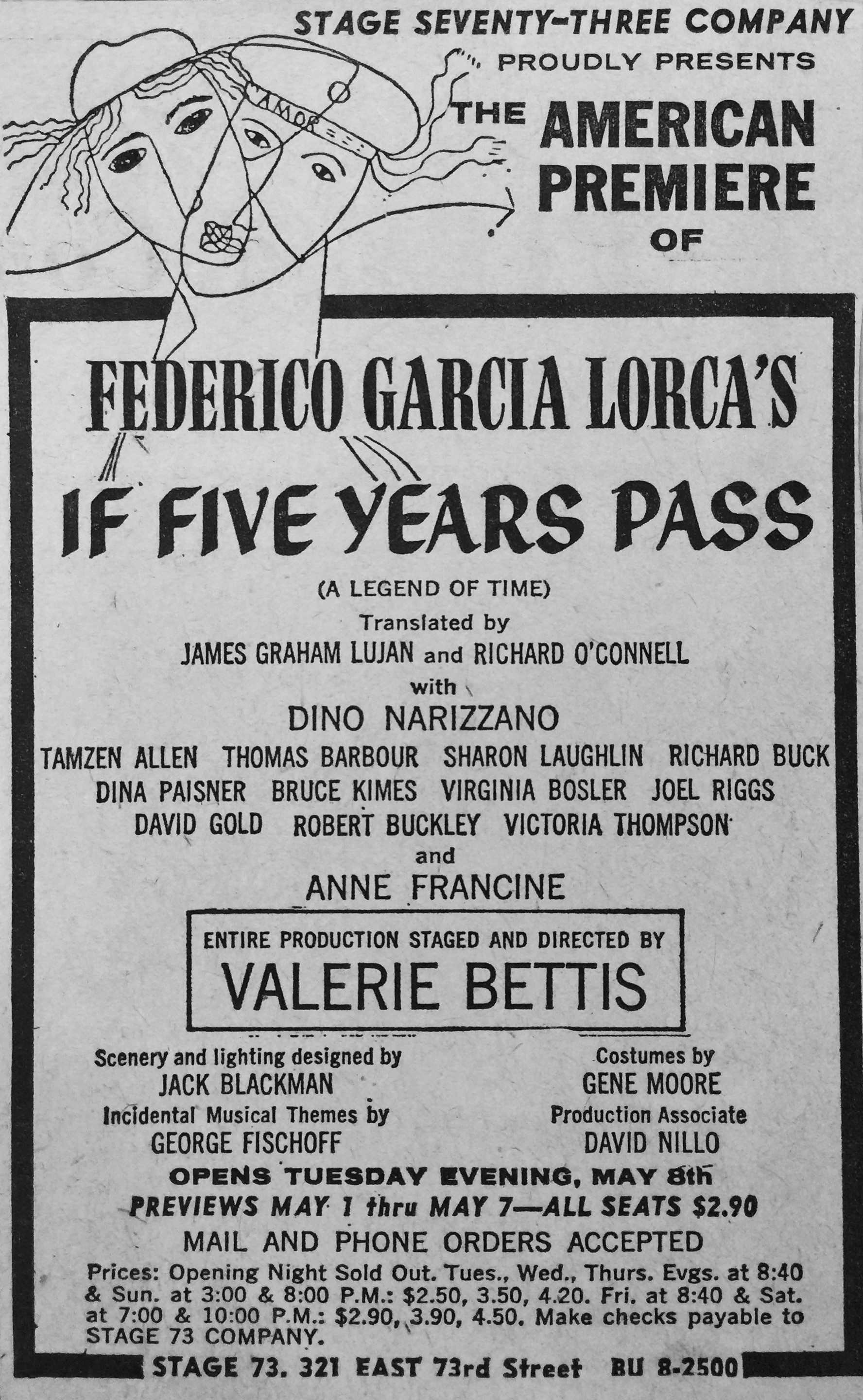

So Let Five Years Pass (Spanish: Así que pasen cinco años), also known as If Five Years Pass and When Five Years Have Passed, is a play by the 20th-century Spanish dramatist Federico García Lorca. It was written in 1931 (Trader Faulkner noted that the play was finished on 19 August 1931, five years to the day before Lorca was killed) but was not given a professional theatrical production until several years after Lorca's death, despite plans to stage it in 1936. It was produced in an English-language translation at the Provincetown Playhouse in New York in April 1945. It received its Spanish-language première in 1954 at the University of Puerto Rico, directed by Victoria Espinosa. In September 1978 it opened at the Teatro Eslava in Madrid.

The critic for ABC, Lorenzo López Sancho, wrote in his review of the Madrid production: "It seems to me that in When Five Years Pass we see the true depth of the great theatrical personality that García Lorca would have become and, probably, his most original and experimental contribution to the theatre."

== Works cited ==
- Edwards, Gwynne. 1980. Lorca: The Theatre Beneath the Sand. London and New York: Marion Boyars Publishers. ISBN 0-7145-2771-8.
