= Emilio Silva =

Spanish sociologist, journalist, activist

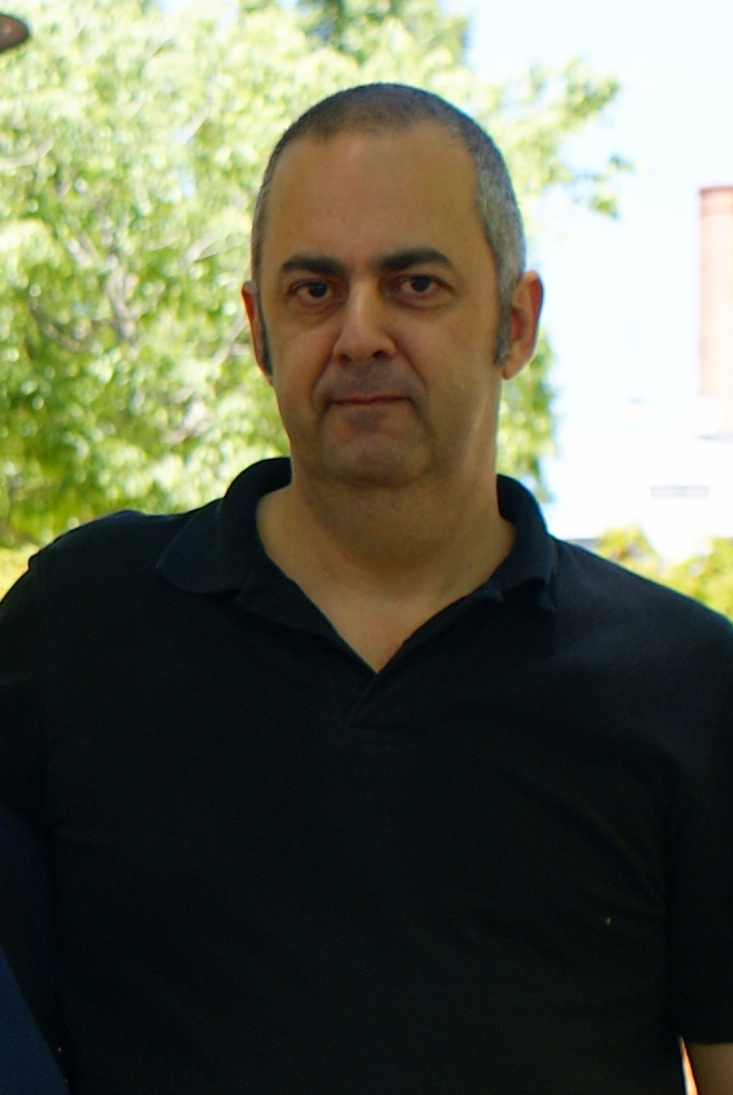
Emilio Silva, Spanish sociologist and journalist, promoter of the Association for the Recovery of Historical Memory.

Emilio Silva Barrera (born November 9, 1965, in Elizondo, Navarre) is a Spanish sociologist, journalist, and activist for the recovery of Historical Memory. He is one of the founders and president of the Association for the Recovery of Historical Memory (ARMH), a collective that has been searching for the mass graves of victims of repression in the Francoist zone during the Spanish Civil War and the subsequent Franco dictatorship.

== Career ==
Though he initially aspired to pursue poetry, Silva graduated in Sociology and Political Science from the Complutense University of Madrid (UCM) and has dedicated most of his professional life to journalism. Within his journalistic career, he was the content director of the television program Caiga quien caiga during Manel Fuentes' tenure.

In the summer of 1999, he left his job to write a novel related to his family history during the repression unleashed by the Francoist troops and paramilitaries after the July 18, 1936 coup. In March 2000, following an interview with the communist militant and former political prisoner Arsenio Marco, he located in Priaranza del Bierzo (León) the site where his grandfather, Emilio Silva Faba, had been buried in a mass grave along with twelve other men. They were all left-wing and republican militants murdered by Falangists on October 16, 1936, during the Spanish Civil War.

In September 2000, he published an article in La Crónica de León titled: "My grandfather was also a disappeared person." In it, he lamented how Spanish society celebrated the so-called Pinochet case while doing nothing to search for the thousands of men and women who had disappeared due to Francoist repression, murdered by Falangist paramilitaries who hid their bodies to multiply the pain of their families and to declare their belief that those who created Spain's first democratic period during the Second Spanish Republic should not have existed.

Following the exhumation of the grave where the now-known "thirteen of Priaranza" were found, he founded, along with Palma Granados, Jorge López, and Santiago Macías, the Association for the Recovery of Historical Memory (ARMH), of which he is president. The association has been exclusively dedicated to searching for Republican disappeared persons, those who were not rescued by either Francoism or democracy. It has also been responsible for exhuming numerous mass graves and providing extensive documentation to people who have not known anything about their loved ones for decades.

From 2007 to 2014, Silva worked as a political trust position for the mayor's office of the Madrid municipality of Rivas-Vaciamadrid. Additionally, he has worked as a journalist in various media outlets and is part of the team of the radio program La Cafetera de radiocable, directed by journalist Fernando Berlín, where Silva covers news related to Historical Memory. Due to his involvement in the recovery of Spain's Historical Memory and the exhumation processes of mass graves, Silva has appeared in several documentaries narrating these processes, such as Los caminos de la memoria (José Luis Peñafuerte, Spain, 2009), premiered at the Valladolid International Film Festival as part of the official section, Lesa Humanidad (Héctor Faver, Spain, 2017) and Bones of Contention (Bones of Contention, Andrea Weiss, United States, 2017).

== Works ==
- 2004 – La memoria de los olvidados: un debate sobre el silencio de la represión franquista. With a foreword by historian Paul Preston. Alongside Asunción Álvarez, Javier Castán, and Pancho Salvador. Ámbito Ediciones. ISBN 978-8481831320.
- 2005 – Las fosas de Franco: La historia de los republicanos que Garzón quiere desenterrar. With Santiago Macías. Temas de Hoy. Barcelona. ISBN 9788484607670.
- 2006 – Las fosas de Franco. Crónica de un desagravio. Temas de Hoy. Barcelona. ISBN 9788484604792.
- 2015 – Memory Policies and Citizenship Construction: Contributions to the Congress of La Granja de San Ildefonso, July 2008. With Ariel Jerez. Postmetrópolis Editorial. Madrid. ISBN 978-8494450006.
- 2020 – Agujeros en el silencio: renglones de memoria contra la impunidad del franquismo 2000–2020. Postmetrópolis Editorial. ISBN 978-84-120187-2-1.
