= Federico García Lorca =

Spanish poet, dramatist and theatre director (1898–1936)

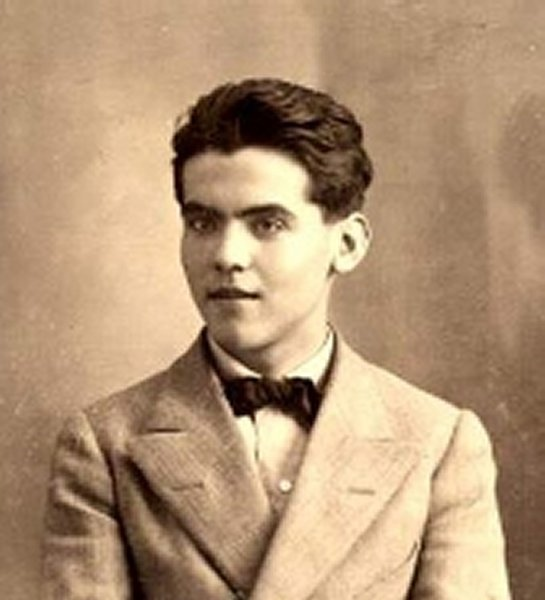
- García Lorca in 1914
- Born: Federico del Sagrado Corazón de Jesús García Lorca; 5 June 1898; Fuente Vaqueros, Granada, Kingdom of Spain
- Died: 19 August 1936 (aged 38) near Alfacar, Granada, Spanish Republic
- Education: University of Granada
- Occupations: Playwright; poet; theatre director
- Movement: Generation of '27

Federico del Sagrado Corazón de Jesús García Lorca (Note: English: /ɡɑːrˌsiːə ˈlɔːrkə/ gar-SEE-ə LOR-kə; Spanish: [feðeˈɾiko ðel saˈɣɾaðo koɾaˈθon de xeˈsus ɣaɾˈθi.a ˈloɾka].) (Note: According to Spanish naming customs, a person usually only uses their father's surname as their main surname. As García is a very widely used name, García Lorca is usually referred to by both his paternal and maternal surnames, and often only by his maternal one. See, for example, "Translating Lorca" (New Statesman, 10 November 2008).) (5 June 1898 – 18 August 1936) was a Spanish poet, playwright, and theatre director. García Lorca achieved international recognition as an emblematic member of the Generation of '27, a group consisting mostly of poets who introduced the tenets of European movements (such as symbolism, futurism, and surrealism) into Spanish literature.

He initially rose to fame with Romancero gitano (Gypsy Ballads, 1928), a book of poems depicting life in his native Andalusia. His poetry incorporated traditional Andalusian motifs and avant-garde styles. After a sojourn in New York City from 1929 to 1930—documented posthumously in Poeta en Nueva York (Poet in New York, 1942)—he returned to Spain and wrote his best-known plays, Blood Wedding (1932), Yerma (1934), and The House of Bernarda Alba (1936).

García Lorca was homosexual and suffered from depression after the end of his relationship with sculptor Emilio Aladrén Perojo. García Lorca also had a close emotional relationship for a time with surrealist artist Salvador Dalí, who said he rejected García Lorca's sexual advances.

García Lorca was assassinated by Nationalist forces at the beginning of the Spanish Civil War. His remains have never been found, and the motive remains in dispute; some theorize he was targeted for being gay, a socialist, or both, while others view a personal dispute as the more likely cause.

== Life and career ==
=== Early years ===
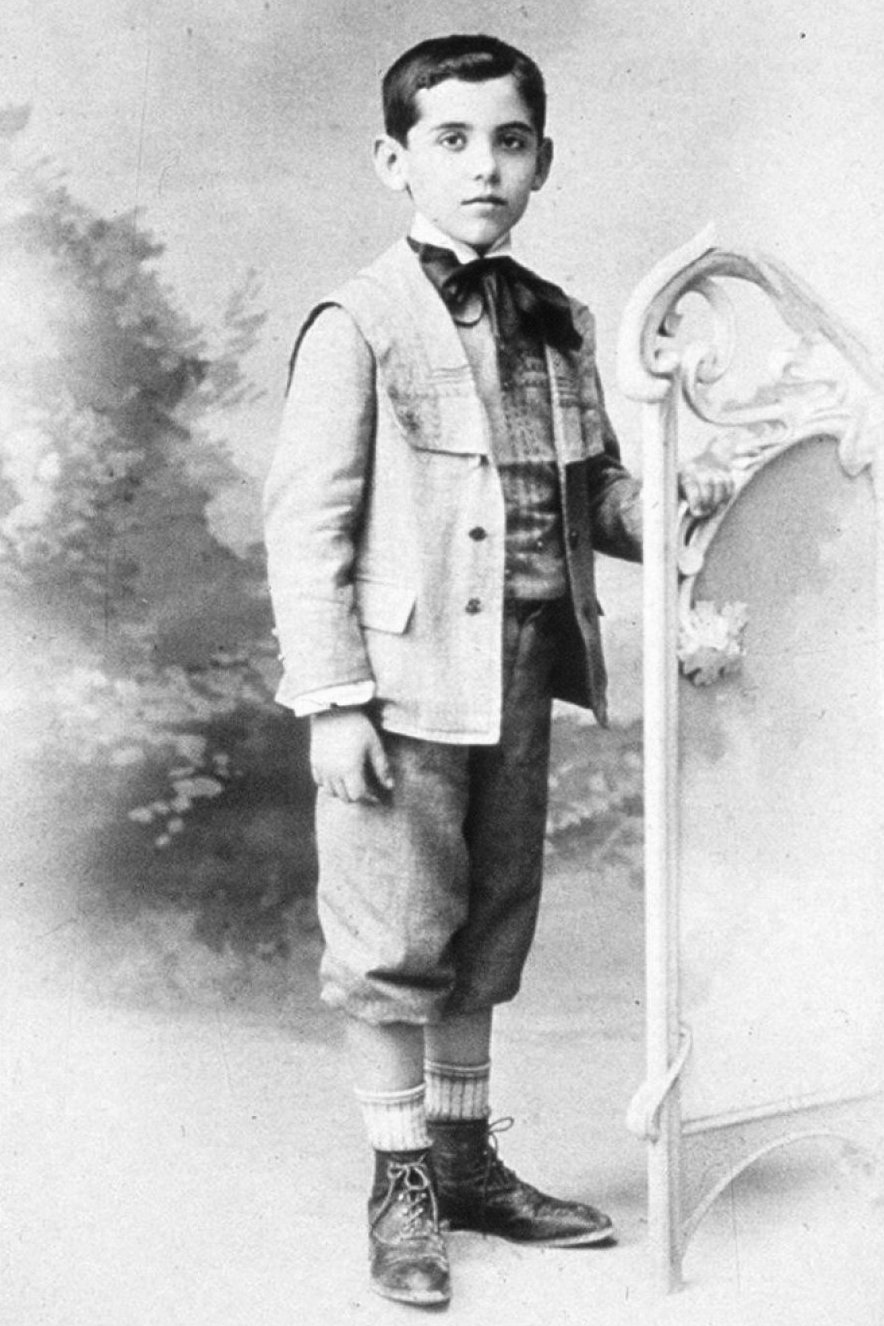
García Lorca c. 1904

Federico del Sagrado Corazón de Jesús García Lorca was born on 5 June 1898, in Fuente Vaqueros, a small town 17 km west of Granada, southern Spain. His father, Federico García Rodríguez, was a prosperous landowner with a farm in the fertile vega (valley) near Granada and a comfortable villa in the heart of the city. García Rodríguez saw his fortunes rise with a boom in the sugar industry. García Lorca's mother, Vicenta Lorca Romero, was a teacher. In 1905, the family moved from Fuente Vaqueros to the nearby town of Valderrubio (at the time named Asquerosa). In 1909, when the boy was 11, his family moved to the regional capital of Granada, where there was the equivalent of a high school; their best-known residence there is the summer home called the Huerta de San Vicente, on what were then the outskirts of the city of Granada. For the rest of his life, he maintained the importance of living close to the natural world, praising his upbringing in the country. All three of these homes—Fuente Vaqueros, Valderrubio, and Huerta de San Vicente—are today museums.

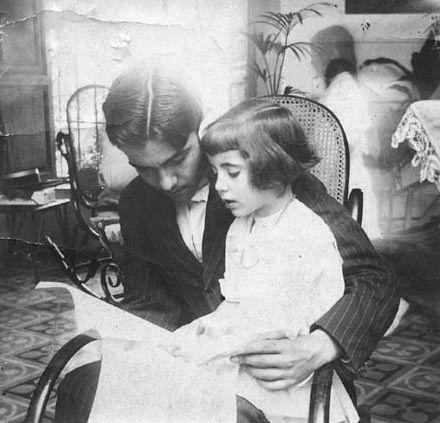
García Lorca with his sister Isabel García Lorca in Granada c. 1914

In 1915, after graduating from secondary school, García Lorca attended the University of Granada. During this time his studies included law, literature, and composition. Throughout his adolescence, he felt a deeper affinity for music than for literature. When he was 11 years old, he began six years of piano lessons with Antonio Segura Mesa, a harmony teacher in the local conservatory and a composer. It was Segura who inspired Federico's dream of a career in music. His first artistic inspirations arose from scores by Claude Debussy, Frédéric Chopin and Ludwig van Beethoven. Later, with his friendship with composer Manuel de Falla, Spanish folklore became his muse. García Lorca did not turn to writing until Segura's death in 1916, and his first prose works, such as "Nocturne", "Ballade", and "Sonata", drew on musical forms. His milieu of young intellectuals gathered in El Rinconcillo at the Café Alameda in Granada. In 1916 and 1917, García Lorca travelled throughout Castile, León, and Galicia, in northern Spain, with a professor of his university, who also encouraged him to write his first book, Impresiones y paisajes (Impressions and Landscapes—printed at his father's expense in 1918). Fernando de los Rios persuaded García Lorca's parents to let him move to the progressive, Oxbridge-inspired Residencia de Estudiantes in Madrid in 1919, while nominally attending classes at the University of Madrid.

=== As a young writer ===
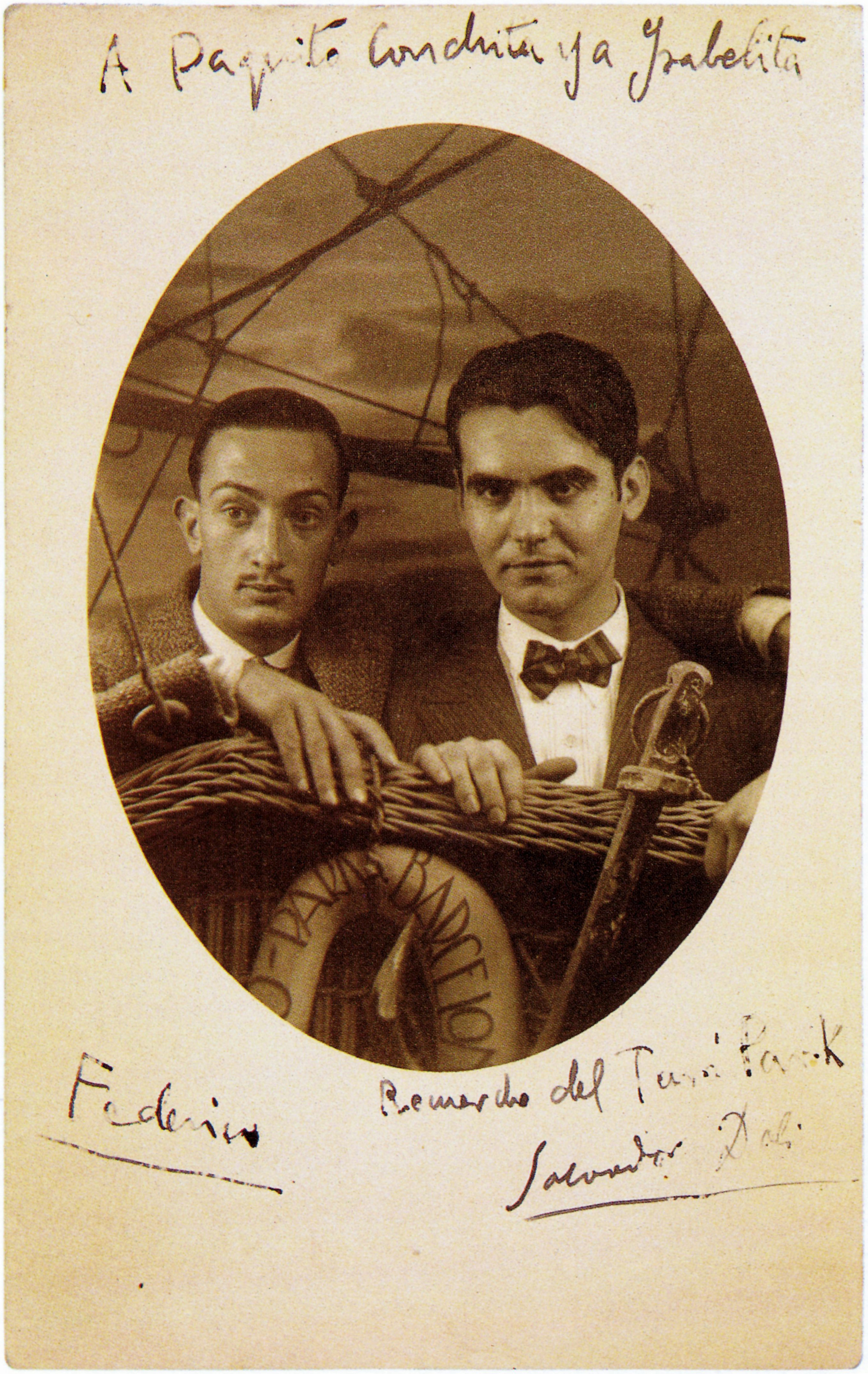
Federico García Lorca with Salvador Dalí, Turó Park de la Guineueta, Barcelona, 1925

At the Residencia de Estudiantes in Madrid, García Lorca befriended Luis Buñuel and Salvador Dalí and many other creative artists who were, or would become, influential across Spain. He was taken under the wing of the poet Juan Ramón Jiménez, becoming close to playwright Eduardo Marquina and Gregorio Martínez Sierra, the Director of Madrid's Teatro Eslava.

In 1919–20, at Sierra's invitation, he wrote and staged his first play, The Butterfly's Evil Spell. It was a verse play dramatising the impossible love between a cockroach and a butterfly, with a supporting cast of other insects; it was laughed off the stage by an unappreciative public after only four performances and influenced García Lorca's attitude to the theatre-going public for the rest of his career. He would later claim that Mariana Pineda, written in 1927, was, in fact, his first play. During his time at the Residencia de Estudiantes, he pursued degrees in law and philosophy, though he had more interest in writing than in study.

García Lorca's first book of poems, Libro de poemas, was published in 1921, collecting work written from 1918, and selected with the help of his brother Francisco (nicknamed Paquito). They concern the themes of religious faith, isolation, and nature that had filled his prose reflections. Early in 1922, at Granada García Lorca joined the composer Manuel de Falla in order to promote the Concurso de Cante Jondo, a festival dedicated to enhancing flamenco performance and its cante jondo style. "During this period, Lorca explored the brief genre of songs, exemplified by the poem 'Orchard, March', which was written between 1921 and 1924 and later collected in his book Canciones." The year before, García Lorca had begun to write his Poema del cante jondo ("Poem of the Deep Song", not published until 1931), so he naturally composed an essay on the art of flamenco, and began to speak publicly in support of the Concurso. At the music festival in June, he met the celebrated Manuel Torre, a flamenco cantaor. The next year in Granada he also collaborated with Falla and others on the musical production of a play for children, La niña que riega la albahaca y el príncipe preguntón (The Girl Who Waters the Basil and the Inquisitive Prince) adapted by Lorca from an Andalusian story. Inspired by the same structural form of sequence as "Deep Song", his collection Suites (1923) was never finished and was not published until 1983.

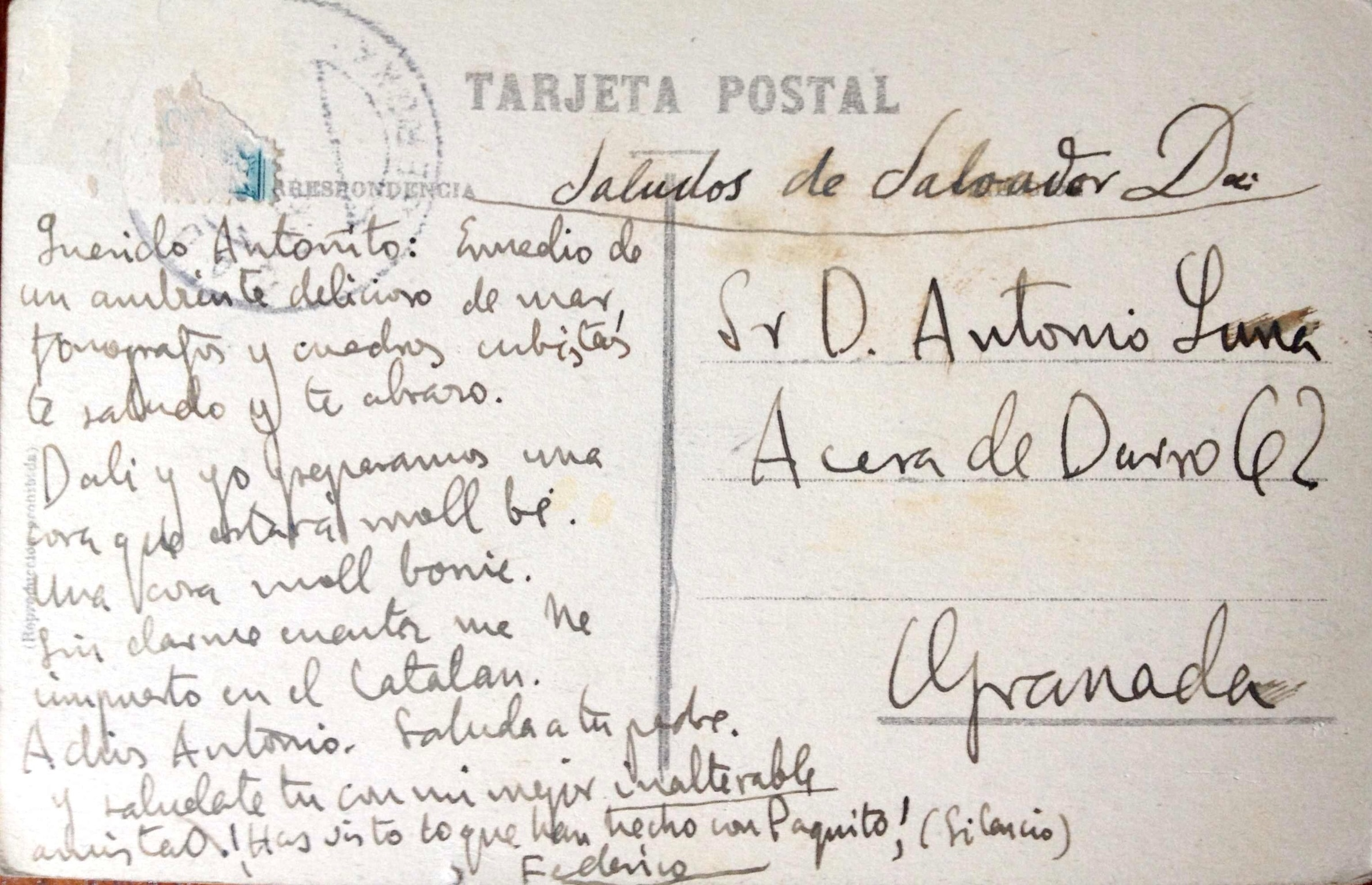
Postcard from Lorca and Dalí to Antonio de Luna, signed "Federico". "Dear Antoñito: In the midst of a delicious ambience of sea, phonographs and cubist paintings I greet you and I hug you. Dalí and I are preparing something that will be 'moll bé.' Something 'moll bonic.' Without realizing it, I have deposited myself in the Catalan. Goodbye Antonio. Say hello to your father. And salute yourself with my finest unalterable friendship. You've seen what they've done with Paquito! (Silence)" Above, penned by Dalí: "Greetings from Salvador Dalí"

Over the next few years, García Lorca became increasingly involved in Spain's avant-garde. He published a poetry collection called Canciones (Songs), although it did not contain songs in the usual sense. Shortly after, Lorca was invited to exhibit a series of drawings at the Galeries Dalmau in Barcelona, from 25 June to 2 July 1927. Lorca's sketches were a blend of popular and avant-garde styles, complementing Canción. Both his poetry and drawings reflected the influence of traditional Andalusian motifs, Cubist syntax, and a preoccupation with sexual identity. Several drawings consisted of superimposed dreamlike faces (or shadows). He later described the double faces as self-portraits, showing "man's capacity for crying as well as winning," in line with his conviction that sorrow and joy were as inseparable as life and death.

Green wind. Green branches.
The ship out on the sea
and the horse on the mountain.
With the shadow at the waist
she dreams on her balcony,
green flesh, green hair,
with eyes of cold silver.

— From "Romance Sonámbulo",
("Sleepwalking Romance"), García Lorca

Romancero gitano (Gypsy Ballads, 1928), part of his Cancion series, became his best-known book of poetry. It was a highly stylised imitation of the ballads and poems that were still being told throughout the Spanish countryside. García Lorca describes the work as a "carved altar piece" of Andalusia with "gypsies, horses, archangels, planets, its Jewish and Roman breezes, rivers, crimes, the everyday touch of the smuggler and the celestial note of the naked children of Córdoba. A book that hardly expresses visible Andalusia at all, but where the hidden Andalusia trembles." In 1928, the book brought him fame across Spain and the Hispanic world, and it was only much later that he gained renown as a playwright. For the rest of his life, the writer would search for the elements of Andaluce culture, trying to find its essence without resorting to the "picturesque" or the clichéd use of "local colour".

His second play, Mariana Pineda, with stage settings by Salvador Dalí, opened to great acclaim in Barcelona in 1927. In 1926, García Lorca wrote the play The Shoemaker's Prodigious Wife, which would not be shown until the early 1930s. It was a farce about fantasy, based on the relationship between a flirtatious, petulant wife and a hen-pecked shoemaker.

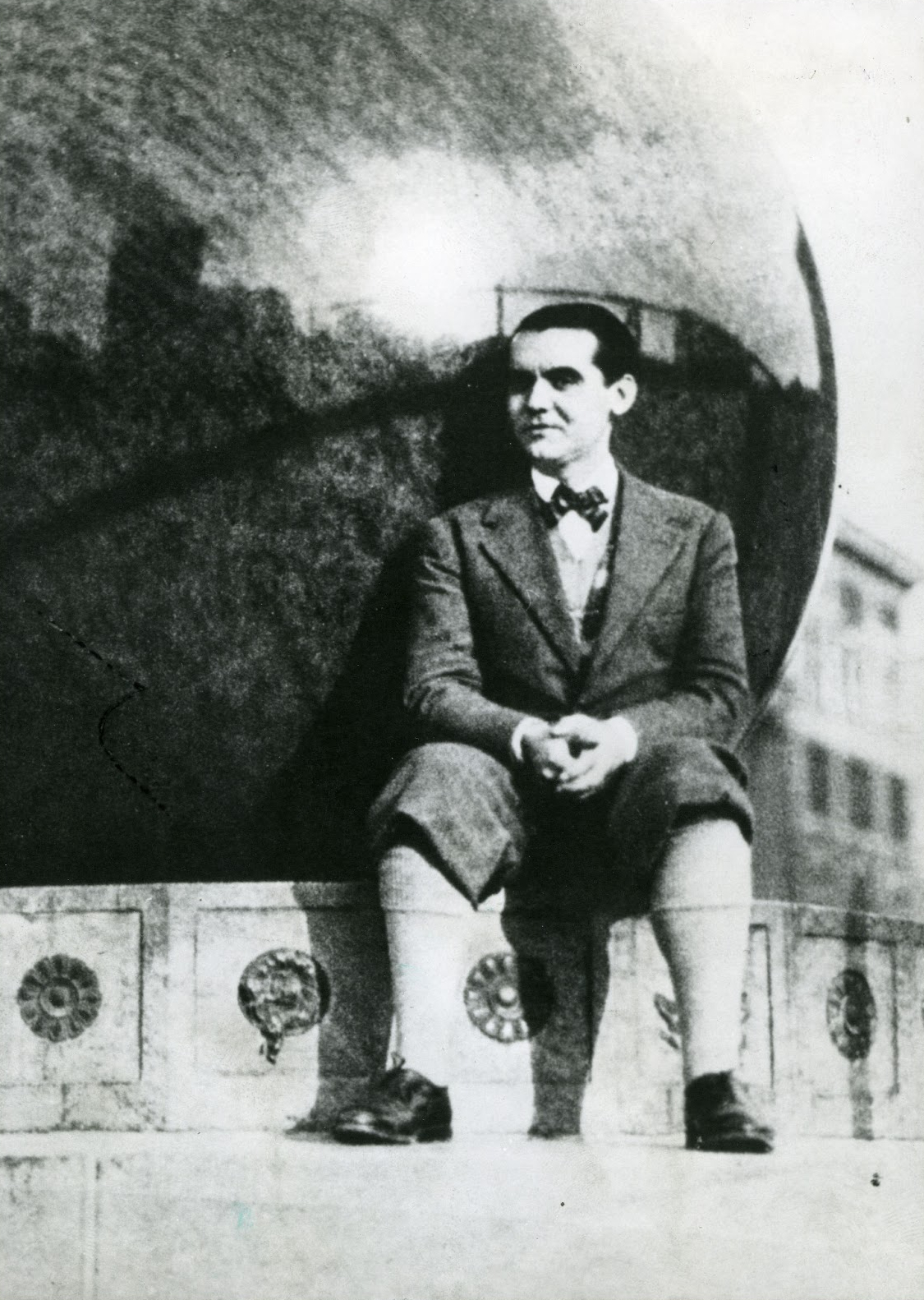
Lorca as a student at Columbia University, 1929

From 1925 to 1928, he was passionately involved with Dalí. Although Dali's friendship with Lorca had a strong element of mutual passion, (Note: For more in-depth information about the Lorca-Dalí connection see Lorca-Dalí: el amor que no pudo ser and The Shameful Life of Salvador Dalí, both by Ian Gibson.) Dalí said he rejected the erotic advances of the poet. With the success of "Gypsy Ballads", came an estrangement from Dalí and the breakdown of a love affair with sculptor Emilio Aladrén Perojo. These brought on an increasing depression, a situation exacerbated by his anguish over his homosexuality. He felt he was trapped between the persona of the successful author, which he was forced to maintain in public, and the tortured, authentic self, which he could acknowledge only in private. He also had the sense that he was being pigeon-holed as a "gypsy poet". He wrote: "The gypsies are a theme. And nothing more. I could just as well be a poet of sewing needles or hydraulic landscapes. Besides, this gypsyism gives me the appearance of an uncultured, ignorant and primitive poet that you know very well I'm not. I don't want to be typecast."

Growing estrangement between García Lorca and his closest friends reached its climax when surrealists Dalí and Luis Buñuel collaborated on their 1929 film Un Chien Andalou (An Andalusian Dog). García Lorca interpreted it, perhaps erroneously, as a vicious attack upon him. At this time Dalí also met his future wife Gala. Aware of these problems (though not perhaps of their causes), García Lorca's family arranged for him to make a lengthy visit to the United States in 1929–30.

In June 1929, García Lorca travelled to the US with Fernando de los Rios on the RMS Olympic, a sister liner to the RMS Titanic. They stayed mostly in New York City, where Rios started a lecture tour and García Lorca enrolled at Columbia University School of General Studies, funded by his parents. He studied English but, as before, was absorbed more by writing than by study. At Columbia, he lived in room 617 in Furnald Hall before moving to room 1231 in John Jay Hall. He also spent time in Vermont and later in Havana, Cuba.

His collection Poeta en Nueva York (Poet in New York, published posthumously in 1940) explores alienation and isolation through some graphically experimental poetic techniques and was influenced by the Wall Street crash which he personally witnessed.

This condemnation of urban capitalist society and materialistic modernity was a sharp departure from his earlier work and label as a folklorist. His play of this time, El público (The Public), was not published until the late 1970s and has never been published in its entirety, the complete manuscript apparently lost. However, the Hispanic Society of America in New York City retains several of his personal letters.

=== The Second Republic ===
García Lorca's return to Spain in 1930 coincided with the fall of the dictatorship of Primo de Rivera and the establishment of the Second Spanish Republic. In 1931, García Lorca was appointed director of a student theatre company, Teatro Universitario La Barraca (The Shack). It was funded by the Second Republic's Ministry of Education, and it was charged with touring Spain's rural areas in order to introduce audiences to classical Spanish theatre free of charge. With a portable stage and little equipment, they sought to bring theatre to people who had never seen any, with García Lorca directing as well as acting. He commented: "Outside of Madrid, the theatre, which is in its very essence a part of the life of the people, is almost dead, and the people suffer accordingly, as they would if they had lost their two eyes, or ears, or a sense of taste. We [La Barraca] are going to give it back to them." His experiences travelling through impoverished rural Spain and New York (particularly amongst the disenfranchised African-American population), transformed him into a passionate advocate of the theatre of social action. He wrote "The theatre is a school of weeping and of laughter, a free forum, where men can question norms that are outmoded or mistaken and explain with living example the eternal norms of the human heart."

While touring with La Barraca, García Lorca wrote his now best-known plays, the "Rural Trilogy" of Blood Wedding, Yerma and The House of Bernarda Alba, which all rebelled against the norms of bourgeois Spanish society. He called for a rediscovery of the roots of European theatre and the questioning of comfortable conventions such as the popular drawing-room comedies of the time. His work challenged the accepted role of women in society and explored taboo issues of homoeroticism and class. García Lorca wrote little poetry in this last period of his life, declaring in 1936, "theatre is poetry that rises from the book and becomes human enough to talk and shout, weep and despair."

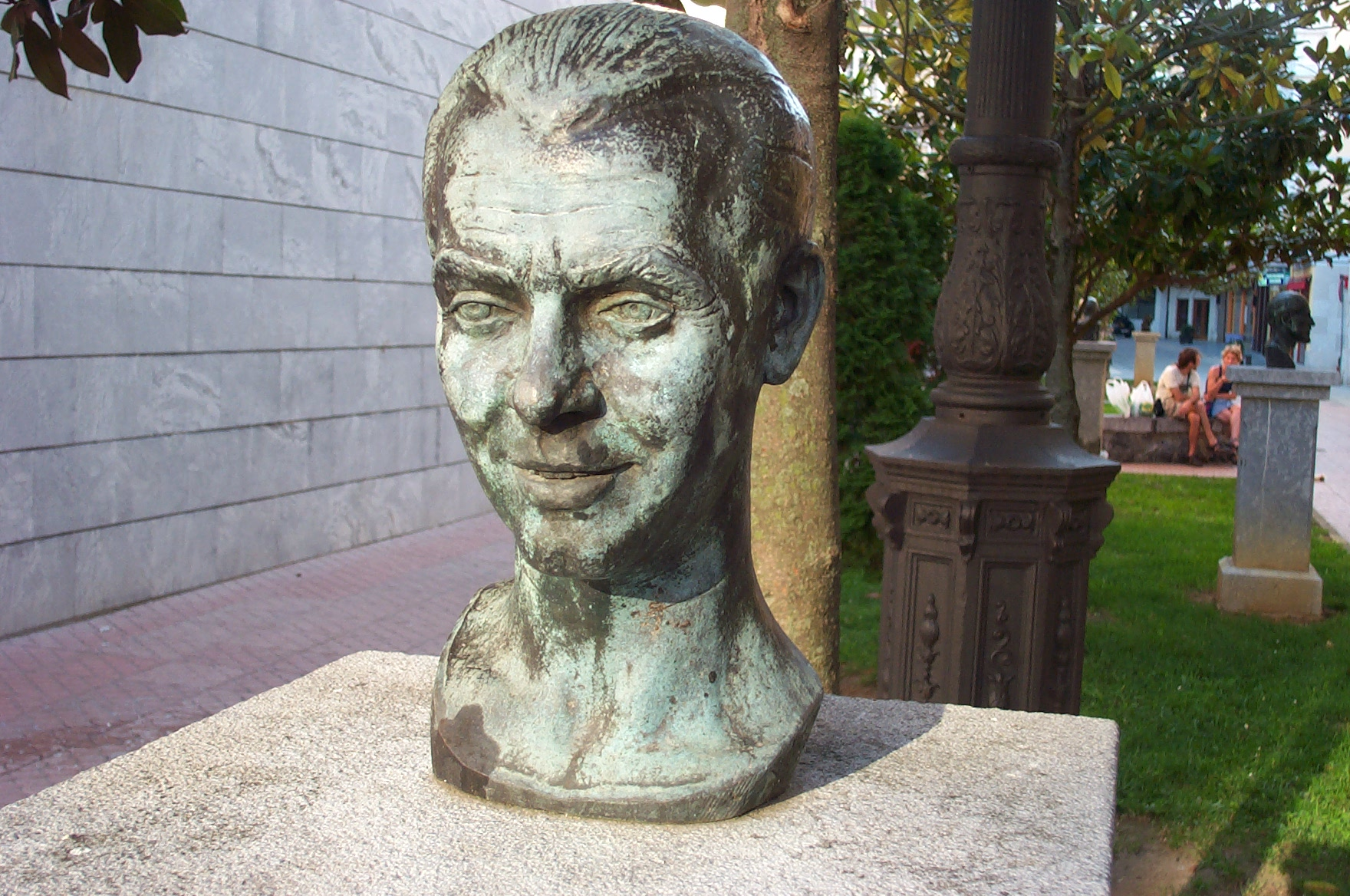
Bust of Federico García Lorca in Santoña, Cantabria

Travelling to Buenos Aires in 1933, to give lectures and direct the Argentine premiere of Blood Wedding, García Lorca spoke of his distilled theories on artistic creation and performance in the famous lecture Play and Theory of the Duende. This attempted to define a schema of artistic inspiration, arguing that great art depends upon a vivid awareness of death, connection with a nation's soil, and an acknowledgement of the limitations of reason.

As well as returning to the classical roots of theatre, García Lorca also turned to traditional forms in poetry. His last poetic work, Sonetos de amor oscuro (Sonnets of Dark Love, 1936), was long thought to have been inspired by his passion for Rafael Rodríguez Rapún, young actor and secretary of La Barraca. Documents and mementos revealed in 2012, suggest that the actual inspiration was Juan Ramírez de Lucas, a 19-year-old with whom Lorca hoped to emigrate to Mexico. The love sonnets are inspired by the 16th-century poet San Juan de la Cruz. La Barraca's subsidy was cut in half by the rightist government elected in 1934, and its last performance was given in April 1936.

Lorca spent summers at the Huerta de San Vicente from 1926 to 1936. Here he wrote, totally or in part, some of his major works, among them When Five Years Pass (Así que pasen cinco años) (1931), Blood Wedding (1932), Yerma (1934) and Diván del Tamarit (1931–1936). The poet lived in the Huerta de San Vicente in the days just before his arrest and assassination in August 1936.

Although García Lorca's drawings do not often receive attention, he was also a talented artist.

== Assassination ==
Political and social tensions had greatly intensified after the July 1936 murder of prominent monarchist and anti-Popular Front spokesman José Calvo Sotelo by Republican Assault Guards (Guardias de asalto). García Lorca knew that he would be considered abhorrent by the rising right wing for his outspoken socialist views. Granada was so tumultuous that it had not had a mayor for months; no one dared accept the job. When García Lorca's brother-in-law, Manuel Fernández Montesinos, agreed to accept the position, he was assassinated within a week. On the same day Fernández Montesinos was shot, 19 August 1936, García Lorca was arrested.

It is thought that García Lorca was shot and killed by Nationalist militia on 19 August 1936. The author Ian Gibson in his book The Assassination of García Lorca argues that he was shot with three others (Joaquín Arcollas Cabezas, Francisco Galadí Melgar and Dióscoro Galindo González) at a place known as the Fuente Grande ('Great Spring') which is on the road between Víznar and Alfacar. Police reports released by radio station Cadena SER in April 2015, conclude that Lorca was executed by fascist forces. The Franco-era report, dated 9 July 1965, describes the writer as a "socialist" and "freemason belonging to the Alhambra lodge", who engaged in "homosexual and abnormal practices".

Significant controversy exists about the motives and details of García Lorca's murder. Personal, non-political motives have been suggested. García Lorca's biographer, Stainton, states that his killers made remarks about his sexual orientation, suggesting that it played a role in his death. Ian Gibson suggests that García Lorca's assassination was part of a campaign of mass killings intended to eliminate supporters of the Leftist Popular Front. However, Gibson proposes that rivalry between the right-wing Spanish Confederation of the Autonomous Right (CEDA) and the fascist Falange was a major factor in Lorca's death. At the time of his arrest, Lorca was hiding in the house of Luis Rosales, two of whose brothers were high-ranking Falange members. Former CEDA Parliamentary Deputy Ramón Ruiz Alonso arrested García Lorca at the Rosales's home, and was the one responsible for the original denunciation that led to the arrest warrant's being issued.

Then I realized I had been murdered.
They looked for me in cafes, cemeteries and churches
.... but they did not find me.
They never found me?
No. They never found me.

— From "The Fable and Round of the Three Friends",
Poet in New York (1929), García Lorca

It has been argued that García Lorca was apolitical and had many friends in both Republican and Nationalist camps. Gibson disputes this in his 1978 book about the poet's death. He cites, for example, Mundo Obrero's published manifesto, which Lorca later signed, and alleges that García Lorca was an active supporter of the Popular Front. García Lorca read out this manifesto at a banquet in honour of fellow poet Rafael Alberti on 9 February 1936.

Many anti-communists were sympathetic to García Lorca or assisted him. In the days before his arrest, he found shelter in the house of the artist and leading Falange member, Luis Rosales. Evidence suggests that Rosales was very nearly shot as well by the Civil Governor Valdés for helping García Lorca. Poet Gabriel Celaya wrote in his memoirs that he once found García Lorca in the company of Falangist José Maria Aizpurúa. Celaya further wrote that Lorca dined every Friday with Falangist founder and leader José Antonio Primo de Rivera. On 11 March 1937, an article appeared in the Falangist press denouncing the murder and lionizing García Lorca; the article opened: "The finest poet of Imperial Spain has been assassinated." Jean-Louis Schonberg also put forward the 'homosexual jealousy' theory.

== Search for remains ==
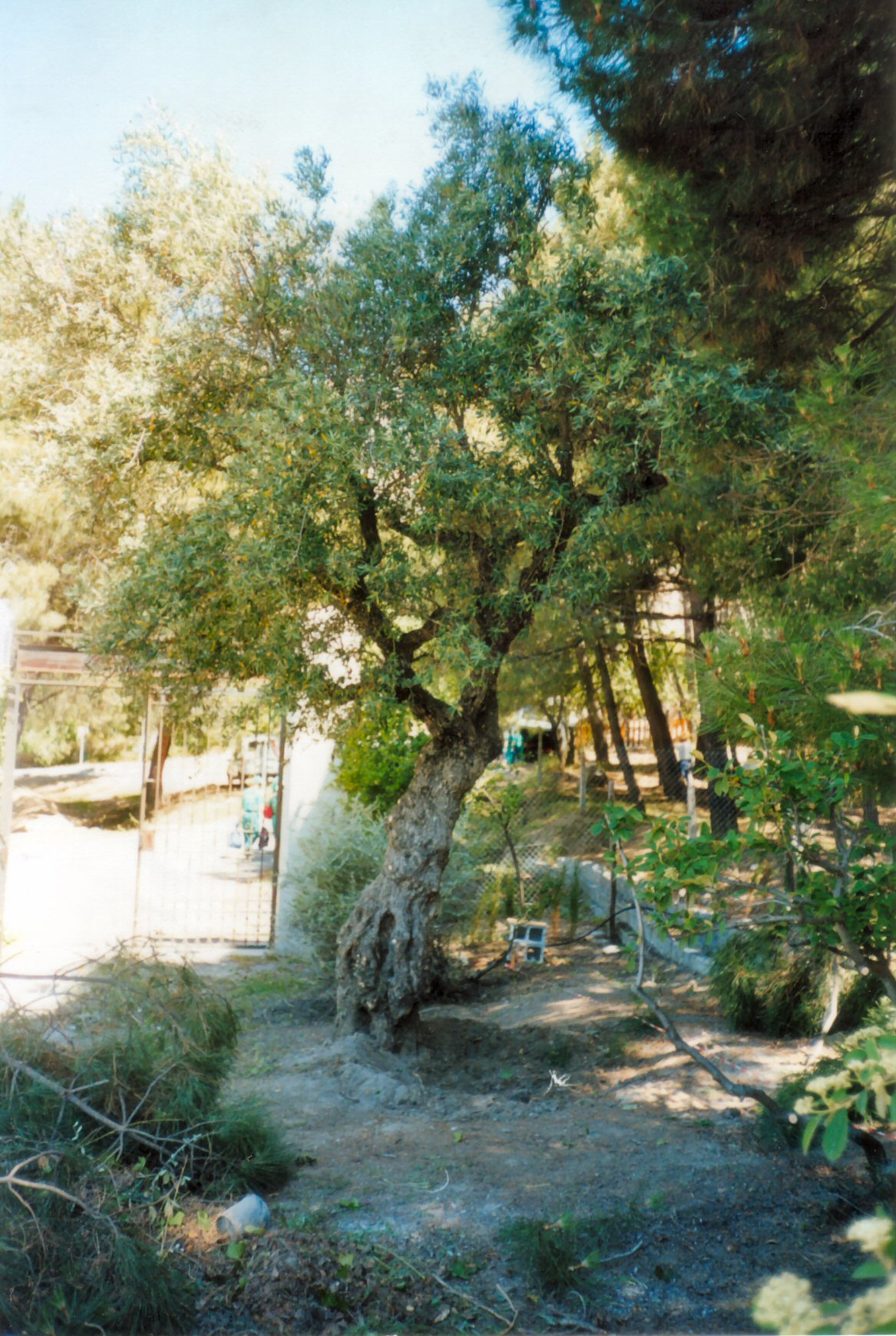
Olive tree marking putative site of Lorca's burial, as it was in 1999

In the later 20th century and, particularly, the 21st century, there have been numerous unsuccessful attempts to locate García Lorca's remains. The first published account was in a 1949 book by the British Hispanist Gerald Brenan, The Face of Spain. By the 21st century, advances in technology gave scope for identifying remains of victims of Francoist repression. The year 2000 saw the foundation of the Association for the Recovery of Historical Memory, which grew out of the quest by a sociologist, Emilio Silva-Barrera, to locate and identify the remains of his grandfather, who was shot by Franco's forces in 1936.

Three efforts have been made in the 21st century to locate García Lorca's body. The first, in 2009, in the García Lorca Memorial Park, the second, in 2014, less than a kilometre from the first excavation, and the last, in 2016, in Alfacar. In 2008, a Spanish judge opened an investigation into García Lorca's death. The García Lorca family dropped objections to the excavation of a potential gravesite near Alfacar, but no human remains were found. The investigation was ultimately dropped and a further investigation was begun in 2016, but met with no more success.

In late October 2009, a team of archaeologists and historians from the University of Granada began excavations outside Alfacar. The site was identified three decades previously by a man who said he had helped dig Lorca's grave. Lorca was thought to be buried with at least three other men beside a winding mountain road that connects the villages of Víznar and Alfacar.

The excavations began at the request of another victim's family. Following a long-standing objection, the Lorca family also gave their permission. In October 2009, Francisco Espínola, a spokesman for the Justice Ministry of the Andalusian regional government, said that after years of pressure, García Lorca's body would "be exhumed in a matter of weeks." Lorca's relatives, who had initially opposed an exhumation, said they might provide a DNA sample in order to identify his remains.

In late November 2009, after two weeks of excavating the site, organic material that was believed to be human bones was recovered. The remains were taken to the University of Granada for examination. But in mid-December 2009, doubts were raised as to whether the poet's remains would be found. The dig produced "not one bone, item of clothing or bullet shell", said Begoña Álvarez, justice minister of Andalucia. She added, "the soil was only 40 cm (16in) deep, making it too shallow for a grave." The failed excavation cost €70,000.

In January 2012, a local historian, Miguel Caballero Pérez, author of "The last 13 hours of García Lorca", applied for permission to excavate another area less than half a kilometre from the site, where he believes Lorca's remains are located.

Claims in 2016, by Stephen Roberts, an associate professor in Spanish literature at the University of Nottingham, and others that Lorca's body was buried in a well in Alfacar have not been substantiated.

In 2021, it was reported that there would be an investigation of mass graves at Barranco de Víznar (a locality near Víznar where there is a memorial to Lorca). This project had the support of families who believed that relatives were buried there. The archaeologist directing the investigation explained that the poet was only one of hundreds of people whose remains might be uncovered. Excavations at the site have continued, and are still in progress as of 2025.

== Censorship ==
Francisco Franco's regime placed a general ban on García Lorca's work, a ban which was not rescinded until 1953. That year, a (censored) Obras completas (Complete Works) was released. Following this, Blood Wedding, Yerma and The House of Bernarda Alba were successfully played on the main Spanish stages. Obras completas did not include his late heavily homoerotic Sonnets of Dark Love, written in November 1935 and shared only with close friends. They were lost until 1983/4 when they were finally published in draft form. (No final manuscripts have ever been found.) It was only after Franco's death that García Lorca's life and death could be openly discussed in Spain. This was not only because of political censorship, but also because of the reluctance of the García Lorca family to allow the publication of unfinished poems and plays prior to the publication of a critical edition of his works.

South African Roman Catholic poet Roy Campbell, who enthusiastically supported the Nationalists both during and after the Civil War, later produced acclaimed translations of Lorca's work. In his poem "The Martyrdom of F. Garcia Lorca", Campbell wrote,

Not only did he lose his life
By shots assassinated:
But with a hammer and a knife
Was after that—translated.

== Memorials ==
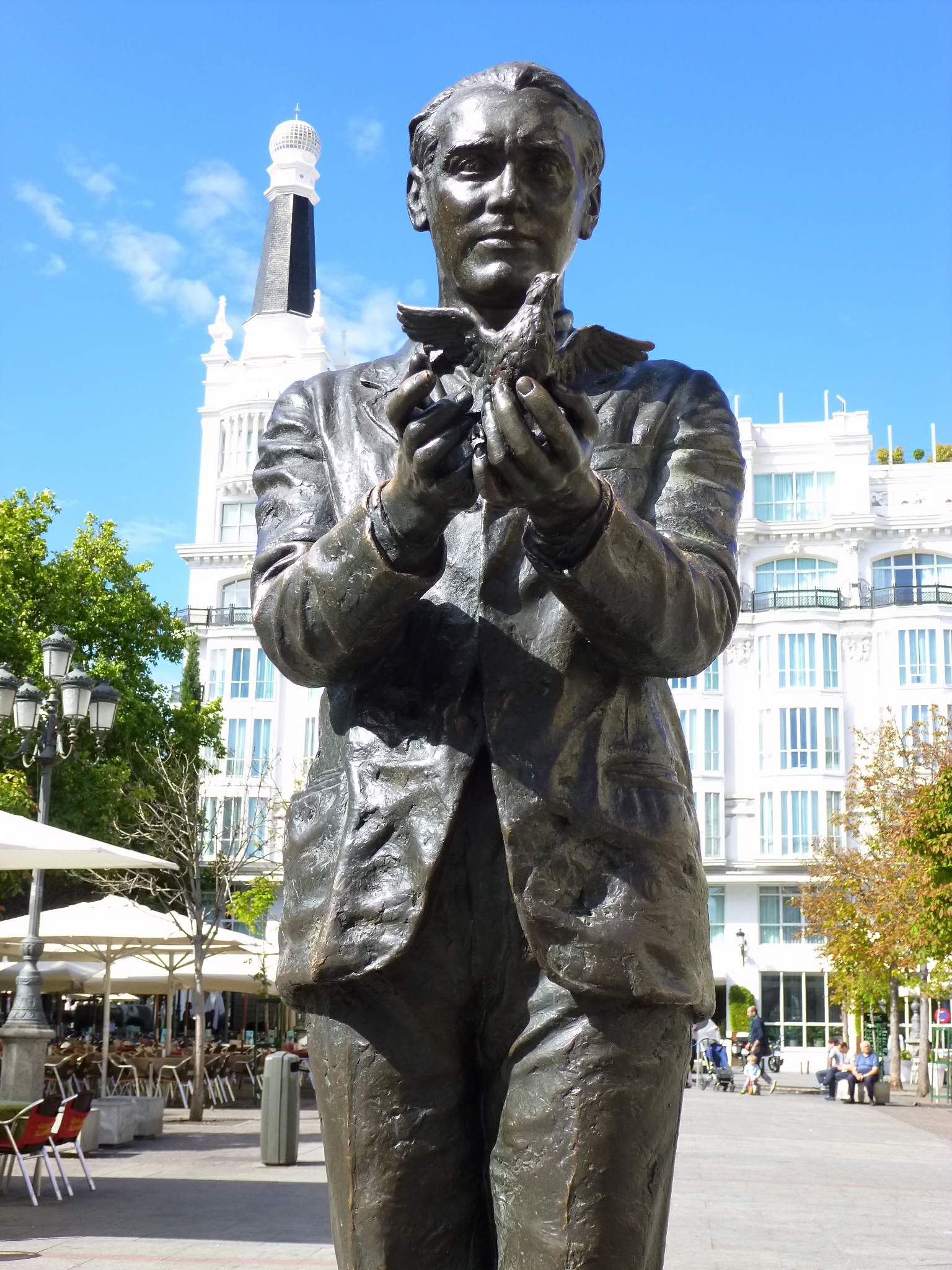
Monument to Federico García Lorca, Madrid

In Granada, the Park Federico García Lorca is dedicated to his memory and includes the Huerta de San Vicente, the Lorca family summer home, opened as a museum in 1995. The grounds, including nearly two hectares of land, the two adjoining houses, works of art, and the original furnishings have been preserved. There is a statue of Lorca on the Avenida de la Constitución in the city centre, and a cultural centre bearing his name was opened in 2015.

The Parque Federico García Lorca, in Alfacar, is near Fuente Grande; in 2009, excavations in it failed to locate Lorca's body. Close to the olive tree indicated by some as marking the location of the grave, there is a stone memorial to Federico García Lorca and all other victims of the Civil War, 1936–1939. Flowers are laid at the memorial every year on the anniversary of his death, and a commemorative event including music and readings of the poet's works is held every year in the park to mark the anniversary. On 17 August 2011, to remember the 75th anniversary of Lorca's assassination and to celebrate his life and legacy, this event included dance, song, poetry and dramatic readings and attracted hundreds of spectators. At the Barranco de Víznar, between Víznar and Alfacar, there is a memorial stone bearing the words "Lorca eran todos, 18-8-2002" ("All were Lorca ..."). The Barranco de Víznar is the site of mass graves and has been proposed as another possible location of the poet's remains.

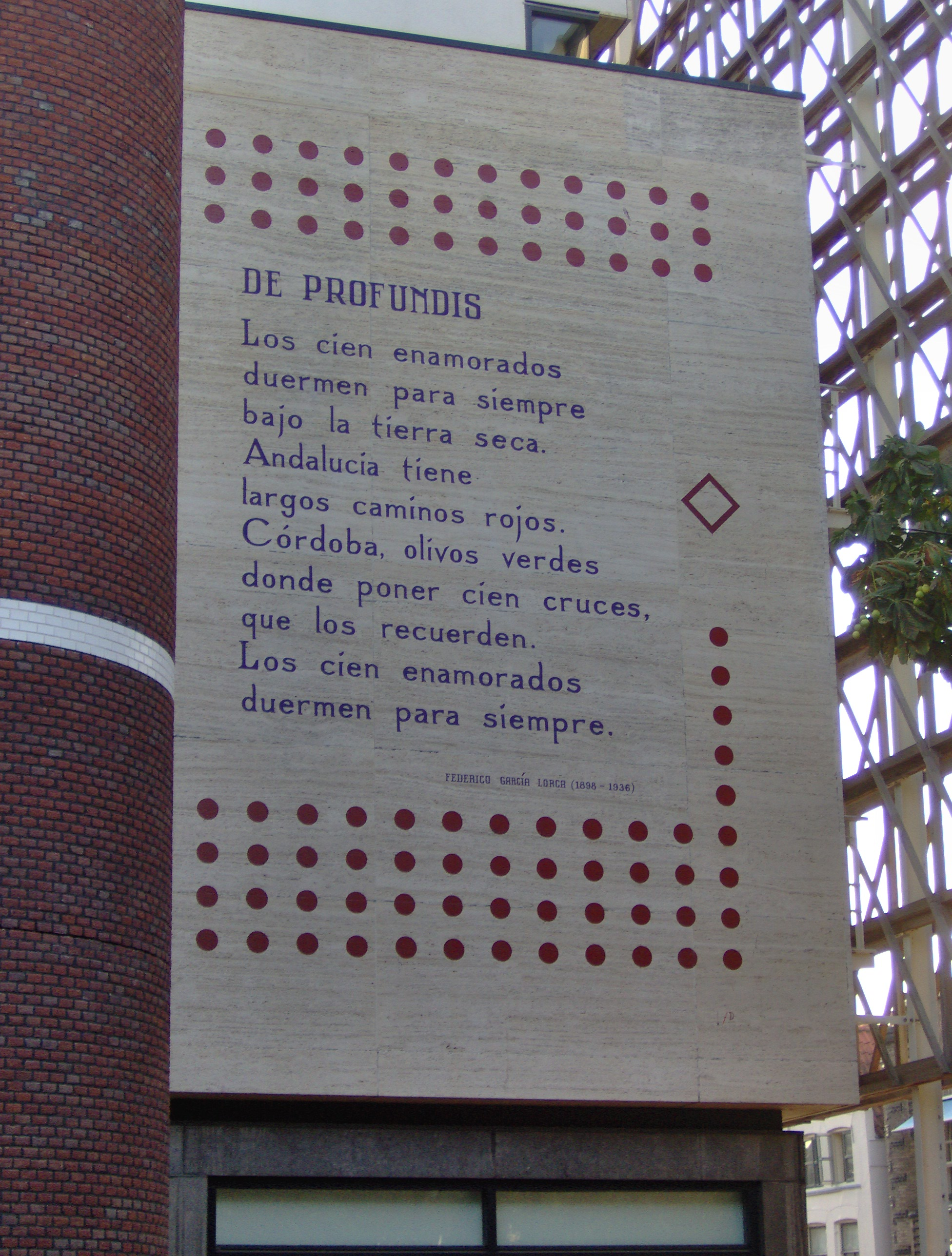
The poem De profundis in Leiden, Netherlands, the last of a set of 110 Wall poems in Leiden to be painted

Lorca is honoured by a statue prominently located in Madrid's Plaza de Santa Ana. Political philosopher David Crocker reported in 2014 that "the statue, at least, is still an emblem of the contested past: each day, the Left puts a red kerchief on the neck of the statue, and someone from the Right comes later to take it off". In Paris Lorca is commemorated in the Federico García Lorca Garden on the Seine.

Lorca's one-time room at the Hotel Castelar in Buenos Aires, Argentina, where he lived for six months in 1933, has been kept as a museum. In 2014, Lorca was one of the inaugural honourees in the Rainbow Honor Walk, a walk of fame in San Francisco's Castro neighborhood noting LGBTQ people who have "made significant contributions in their fields". The Indonesian composer Ananda Sukarlan has composed music based on some of his poems in 2016 to commemorate the 80th anniversary of his death, commissioned by the Spanish Embassy in Indonesia and the Ubud Writers & Readers Festival (Bali) where it was premiered by soprano Mariska Setiawan.

The Fundación Federico García Lorca, directed by Lorca's niece Laura García Lorca, sponsors the celebration and dissemination of the writer's work and is currently building the Centro Federico García Lorca in Madrid. The Lorca family deposited all Federico documents in their possession with the foundation, which holds them on their behalf.

== Major works ==
=== Poetry collections ===
- Impresiones y paisajes (Impressions and Landscapes 1918)
- Libro de poemas (Book of Poems 1921)
- Poema del cante jondo (Poem of the Deep Song; written in 1921 but not published until 1931)
- Suites (written between 1920 and 1923, published posthumously in 1983)
- Canciones (Songs written between 1921 and 1924, published in 1927)
- Romancero gitano (Gypsy Ballads 1928)
- Odes (written 1928)
- Poeta en Nueva York (written 1930 – published posthumously in 1940, first translation into English as Poet in New York 1940)
- Llanto por Ignacio Sánchez Mejías (Lament for Ignacio Sánchez Mejías 1935)
- Seis poemas galegos (Six Galician poems 1935)
- Sonetos del amor oscuro (Sonnets of Dark Love 1936, not published until 1983)
- Lament for the Death of a Bullfighter and Other Poems (1937)
- Primeras canciones (First Songs 1936)
- Diván del Tamarit (The Tamarit Divan, poems written 1931–34 and not published until after his death in a special edition of Revista Hispánica Moderna in 1940).
- Selected Poems (1941)

=== Select translations ===
- Poem of the Deep Song – Poema del Cante Jondo, translated by Carlos Bauer (includes original Spanish verses). City Lights Books, 1987 ISBN 0-87286-205-4
- Poem of the Deep Song, translated by Ralph Angel. Sarabande Books, 2006 ISBN 1-932511-40-7
- Gypsy Ballads: A Version of the Romancero Gitano of Federico García Lorca Translated by Michael Hartnett. Goldsmith Press 1973
- "Poet in New York-Poeta en Nueva York," translated by Pablo Medina and Mark Statman (includes original Spanish, with a preface by Edward Hirsch), Grove Press, 2008, ISBN 978-0-8021-4353-2; 0-8021-4353-9
- Gypsy Ballads, bilingual edition translated by Jane Duran and Gloria García Lorca. Enitharmon Press 2016
- Sonnets of Dark Love - The Tamarit Divan, bilingual edition translated by Jane Duran and Gloria García Lorca with essays by Christopher Maurer and Andrés Soria Olmedo. Enitharmon Press 2016
- Yerma, translated by Kathryn Phillips-Miles and Simon Deefholts, "The Clapton Press". 18 October 2020. 2020. ISBN 9781999654399
- The Dream of Apples: Selected Poems of Federico García Lorca, bilingual edition translated by Rebecca Seiferle, winner of the Stephen Mitchell Prize for excellence in translation. Green Linden Press 2024.

=== Plays ===
- Christ: A Religious Tragedy (unfinished 1917)
- The Butterfly's Evil Spell: (written 1919–20, first production 1920)
- The Billy-Club Puppets: (written 1922–5, first production 1937)
- The Puppet Play of Don Cristóbal: (written 1923, first production 1935)
- Mariana Pineda (written 1923–25, first production 1927)
- The Curse of the Butterfly, first production 1927 in the Teatro Eslava, Madrid
- The Shoemaker's Prodigious Wife: (written 1926–30, first production 1930, revised 1933)
- The Love of Don Perlimplín and Belisa in the Garden: (written 1928, first production 1933)
- The Public: (written 1929–30, first production 1972); only an incomplete draft is known
- When Five Years Pass: (written 1931, first production 1945)
- Blood Wedding: (written 1932, first production 1933)
- Yerma (written 1934, first production 1934)
- Doña Rosita the Spinster: (written 1935, first production 1935)
- Play Without a Title: (only one act, written 1936, first production 1986)
- The House of Bernarda Alba: (written 1936, first production 1945)
- Dreams of my Cousin Aurelia: (unfinished)

=== Short plays ===
- El paseo de Buster Keaton (Buster Keaton goes for a stroll 1928)
- La doncella, el marinero y el estudiante (The Maiden, the Sailor and the Student 1928)
- Quimera (Dream 1928)

=== Filmscripts ===
- Viaje a la luna (Trip to the Moon 1929)

=== Operas ===
- Lola, la Comedianta (Lola, the Actress/Comedian, unfinished collaboration with Manuel de Falla 1923)

=== Drawings and paintings ===
- Salvador Dalí, 1925. 160 × 140 mm. Ink and coloured pencil on paper. Private collection, Barcelona, Spain
- Bust of a Dead Man, 1932. Ink and coloured pencil on paper. Chicago, Illinois

== See also ==
- Canciones españolas antiguas

== Sources ==
- Cao, Antonio (1984). García Lorca y las Vanguardias. London: Tamesis. ISBN 0-729-30202-4.
- Gibson, Ian (1989). Federico García Lorca. London: Faber and Faber. ISBN 0-571-14224-9. OCLC 21600658.
- Stainton, Leslie (1999). Lorca: A Dream of Life. London: Farrar Straus & Giroux. ISBN 0-374-19097-6. OCLC 246338520.
- Doggart, Sebastian; Thompson, Michael, eds. (1999). Fire, Blood and the Alphabet: One Hundred Years of Lorca. Durham: University of Durham. ISBN 0-907310-44-3. OCLC 43821099.
- Mario Hernandez Translated by Christopher Maurer (1991). Line of Light and Shadow: The Drawings of Federico García Lorca. Duke University Press. ISBN 0-8223-1122-4.
- Maurer, Christopher (2001) Federico García Lorca: Selected Poems Penguin.
- Lorca, Francisco Garcia. In the Green Morning: Memories of Frederico (Peter Owen, 1989) translated by Christopher Maurer, prologue by Mario Hernandez.
