= Mariska Setiawan =

Indonesian soprano

Mariska Setiawan is an Indonesian soprano. She lives in Surabaya.

== Early life ==
Mariska was born in Surabaya, Indonesia. She has participated in master classes in Indonesia and abroad, working with Stella Zhou, Professor Renate Faltin, and Ildikó Raimondi from Hochschule für Music Hanns Eisler (in Berlin) and the Mozarteum (in Salzburg).

== Background ==
Mariska Setiawan has regularly collaborated with Ananda Sukarlan to sing in his concerts, which are based on literary works. In addition to the concerts, she has performed as the titular character of his opera, Tumirah, which features the many important vocal works of Sukarlan:

- Rangkaian Rahasia untuk Mariska (5 songs for soprano & piano based on poems by Adimas Immanuel)
- 2 poems of Hasan Aspahani
- 3 poems of Nanang Suryadi

She performed as a soloist at the World Culture Forum 2016, and premiered Sukarlan's works based on Spanish poets Miguel de Cervantes and Federico García Lorca at the Ubud Writers and Readers Festival.

Mariska has released two albums. An Essay on Love was released in 2016, based on the request of the former-president of Indonesia (the late Professor B.J. Habibie) in memory of the president's late wife, Hj. Ainun.

== See also ==
- Ananda Sukarlan
