= Parque Federico García Lorca =

Park in Spain

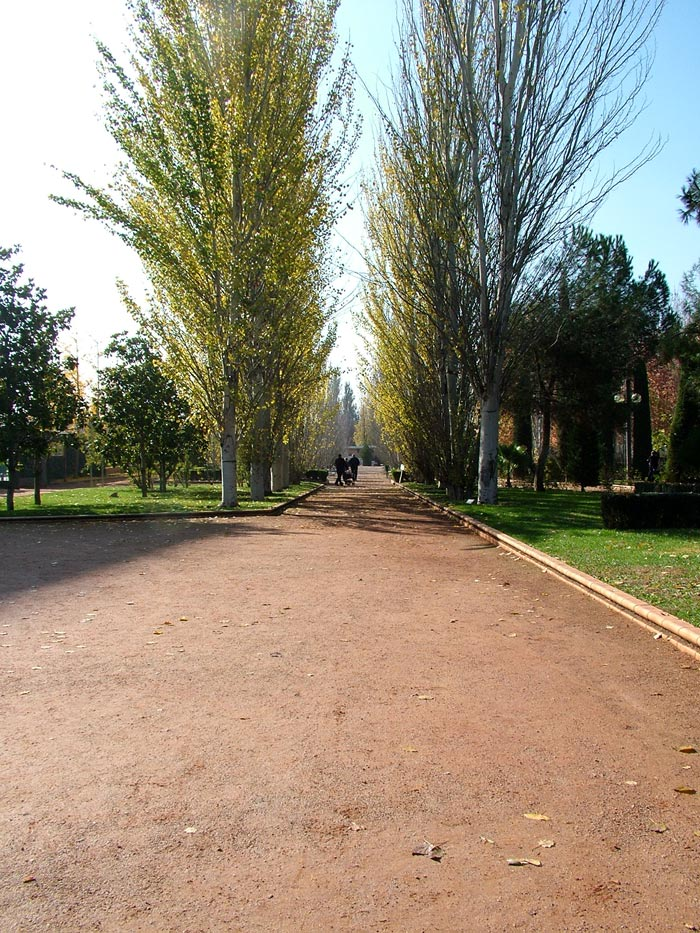
- Interactive map of Parque Federico García Lorca
- Type: Public park
- Location: Granada, Spain
- Coordinates: 37.1706°N 3.6094°W
- Area: 71,000 m (233,000 ft)
- Created: 1992
- Operator: Ayuntamiento de Granada
- Status: Open year-round

The Parque Federico García Lorca is a park situated in Arabial St., Granada, Spain. It is named after the Spanish poet Federico García Lorca. It is designed with avenues and palm trees. The park is opened to the public during daylight hours. Admission is free.

The present park formed part of the Huerta de San Vicente estate, which was bought by Lorca's father in 1925 and was the family's main base in Granada. For the next decade, Lorca wrote many of his most important works at the farm. In August 1936 he fled there when pursued by Francoist soldiers, and left the house for the last time in August 1936. The farmhouse is now a house museum.
