= Jane Duran =

Cuban poet

Jane Duran, born 1944 (age 80–81), is a Spanish-American poet, born in Cuba whilst her father was working as a diplomat in the country.

== Background ==
Duran was born in Cuba to an American mother and a Spanish father, Gustavo Durán, who had fought with the Republican army in the Spanish Civil War. He fled Spain after Franco's victory but would never talk about his experiences. The themes of silences, loss and exile haunt much of her work. Duran was brought up in the United States and Chile, moving to England in 1966 after graduating from Cornell University. She now lives in London with her Algerian husband and their son.

She has published four collections – Breathe Now, Breathe (1995), Silences from the Spanish Civil War (2002), Coastal (2006) and Graceline, all published by Enitharmon Press. Breathe Now, Breathe won the Forward Poetry Prize for Best First Collection and in 2005 Duran received a Cholmondeley Award.

In collaboration with Gloria García Lorca she translated two poetry collections of Spanish poet Federico García Lorca, Gypsy Ballads (2011) and Sonnets of Dark Love - The Tamarit Divan (2016), both published by Enitharmon Press.
