= Ian Gibson (author) =

Irish author (born 1939)

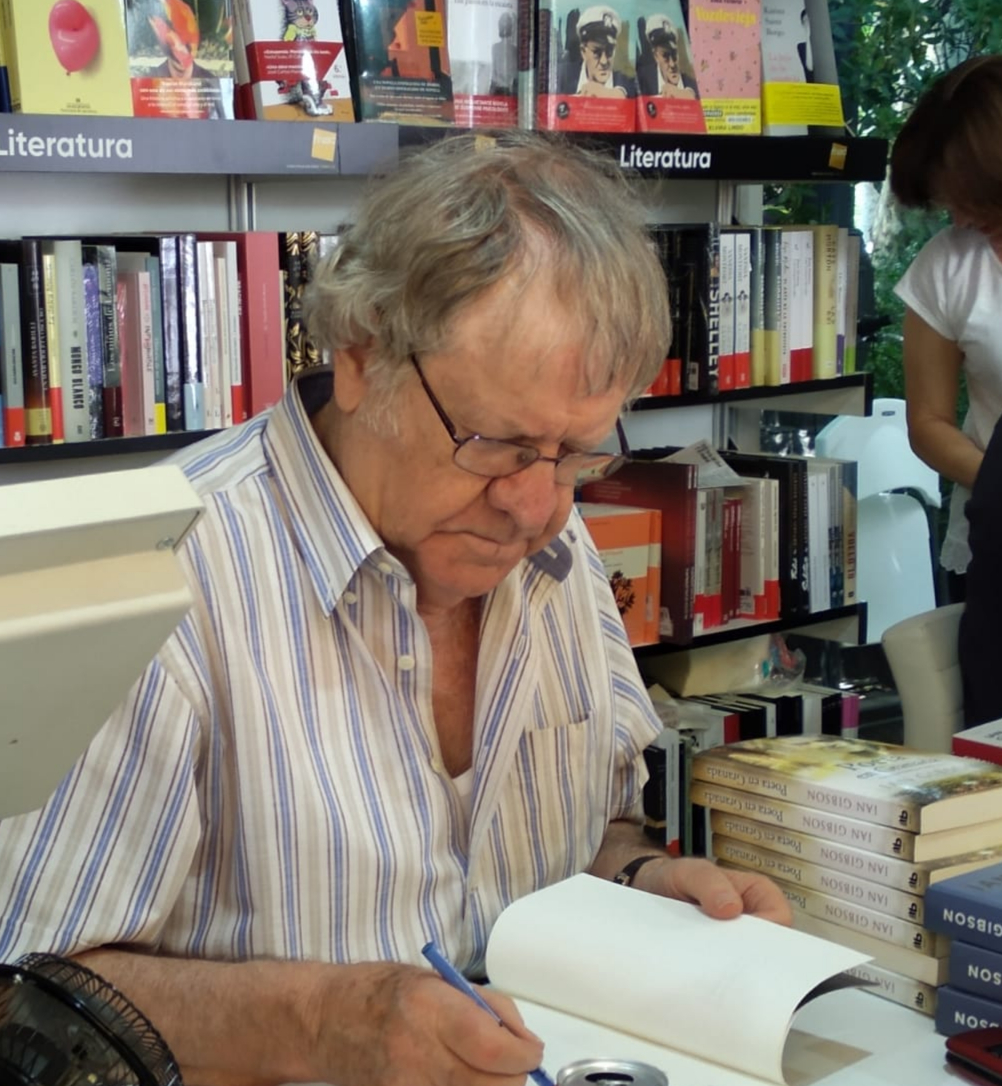
- Ian Gibson at the Madrid Book Fair on 2 June 2019
- Born: 21 April 1939 (age 87); Dublin, Ireland
- Citizenship: Spanish
- Education: Trinity College
- Occupation: Writer
- Writing career
- Language: Spanish English

Ian Keith Gibson (born 21 April 1939) is an Irish-born Spanish author and Hispanist known for his biographies of the poet Antonio Machado, the artist Salvador Dalí, the bibliographer Henry Spencer Ashbee, the filmmaker Luis Buñuel, and particularly his work on the poet and playwright Federico García Lorca, for which he won several awards, including the 1989 James Tait Black Memorial Prize for biography. His work, La represión nacionalista de Granada en 1936 y la muerte de Federico García Lorca (The Nationalist Repression of Granada in 1936 and the Death of Federico García Lorca) was banned in Spain under Franco.

Born in Dublin to a Methodist family, he was educated at Newtown School in Waterford and graduated from Trinity College, Dublin. He taught modern Spanish literature at Queen's University Belfast and the University of London before moving to Spain. His first novel, Viento del Sur (Wind of the South, 2001), written in Spanish, examines class, religion, family life, and public schools in British society through the fictitious autobiography of a character named John Hill, an English linguist and academic. It won favourable reviews in Spain.

Gibson has also worked in television on projects centering on his scholarly work in Spanish history, having served as a historical consultant and even acting in one historical drama.

He was granted a Spanish passport (citizenship) in 1984.

Gibson narrated a two-part documentary for BBC2 on the Great Famine of Ireland in 1995.

He appeared in an honorary position in the list proposed by Podemos, Alianza Verde and independents to the 2023 local elections in Granada.

In 2024 he was named Honorary President of the Iberian Society, the main association of this socio-cultural movement, after his public declarations in favor of Iberism and the strengthening of relations between Portugal and Spain.

== Publications of Ian Gibson ==
Historical and/or biographical works

- 1971: La represión nacionalista de Granada en 1936 y la muerte de Federico García Lorca, París, 1971, Ruedo Ibérico (translated into English as The Death of Lorca, London, 1972), republished in 1979.
- 1978: El vicio inglés, Spanish translation of The English Vice, London, 1978; Barcelona, 1980.
- 1980: En busca de José Antonio, Barcelona, 1980, Prize "Espejo" of Spain 1980.
- 1982: La noche en que mataron a Calvo Sotelo, Barcelona.
- 1983: Paracuellos, cómo fue, Barcelona.
- 1985: Federico García Lorca, Barcelona, translated into English as Federico García Lorca. A Life (London, 1989).
- 1986: Queipo de Llano. Sevilla, verano de 1936, Barcelona.
- 1989: En Granada, su Granada... Guía a la Granada de Federico García Lorca, Barcelona, translated into English by the author as Lorca's Granada. A Practical Guide (London, 1992).
- 1992: España, English translation in 1993 Fire in the Blood. The New Spain, London, 1992.
- 1998: Vida, pasión y muerte de Federico García Lorca, Barcelona.
- 1997: The Shameful Life of Salvador Dalí, London, 1997.
- 1999: Lorca-Dalí, el amor que no pudo ser, Barcelona, 1999.
- 2001: The Erotomaniac. The Secret Life of Henry Spencer Ashbee, London, 2001.
- 2003: Cela, el hombre que quiso ganar, Madrid.
- 2004: Dalí joven, Dalí genial, Madrid.
- 2006: Ligero de equipaje. La vida de Antonio Machado, Madrid.
- 2007: Cuatro poetas en guerra, Barcelona.
- 2008: El hombre que detuvo a García Lorca. Ramón Ruiz Alonso y la muerte del poeta, Madrid.
- 2009: Caballo azul de mi locura. Lorca y el mundo gay, Barcelona.
- 2010: La fosa de Lorca. Crónica de un despropósito, Alcalá la Real.
- 2013: Luis Buñuel. La forja de un cineasta universal, Madrid.
- 2015: Poeta en Granada. Paseos con Federico García Lorca, Barcelona.
- 2019: Los últimos caminos de Antonio Machado. De Collioure a Sevilla, Barcelona.
- 2021: Hacia la República Federal Ibérica. Reflexión y sueño de un hispanista irredento, Barcelona.

Autobiographical work

- 1981: Un irlandés en España, Barcelona.
- 2017: Aventuras ibéricas. Recorridos, reflexiones e irreverencias, Barcelona.

Novels

- 2001: Viento del sur. Memorias apócrifas de un inglés salvado por España, Barcelona.
- 2002: Yo, Rubén Darío. Memorias póstumas de un Rey de la Poesía, Madrid.
- 2012: La berlina de Prim, Barcelona.

Memories

- 2023: Un carmen en Granada, Barcelona.
