= The Romantic Young Lady (TV play) =

- Based on: Sueño de una noche de agosto by María de la O Lejárraga and Gregorio Martínez Sierra in a translation by Helen and Harley Granville-Barker
- Directed by: Harold Clayton
- Starring: Sylvia Syms
- Music by: Julian Bream
- Country of origin: United Kingdom
- Original language: English

Production
- Producer: Harold Clayton
- Running time: 90 mins

Original release
- Network: BBC Television
- Release: 5 July 1955

The Romantic Young Lady is a 1955 British TV production based on a stage play. The production, which starred Sylvia Syms in her first lead role, was well received.

== History ==
The stage play The Romantic Young Lady opened in London in 1920. It was a translation of a work which had recently been successful in Madrid. The play was revived from time to time on the British stage, and was televised in the 1930s (the cast included Barbara Everest). The play seems to have dropped out of the repertoire after the 1950s.

== Plot summary ==
In Madrid, a young woman dreams of escape.

== Cast ==
- Sylvia Syms as Rosario
- John Breslin as Pepe
- Eric Lander as Emilio
- Roger Gage as Mario
- Marjorie Fielding as Doña Barbarita (Grandmother)
- Margaret Boyd as Maria Pepa (The Maid)
- Tony Britton as The Apparition (The Author)
- Raymond Rollett as Don Juan
- Olivia Irving as Irene (The Secretary)
- Walter Horsbrugh as Guillermo
- Joan Seton as Amalia (The Famous Dancer)

== Reception ==
The Guardian said Syms "acts with a rare intelligence and poise." The Manchester Evening News said it "had a great deal of charm". The Liverpool Echo said "in a part which was not exactly an easy one, Miss Syms gave a performance hinting at considerable talent."

The reception led to a number of offers for Syms, including a seven year contract with Associated British and a role in My Teenage Daughter.
