= Kettering Savoy =

Coordinates: 52°23′54″N 0°43′5″W

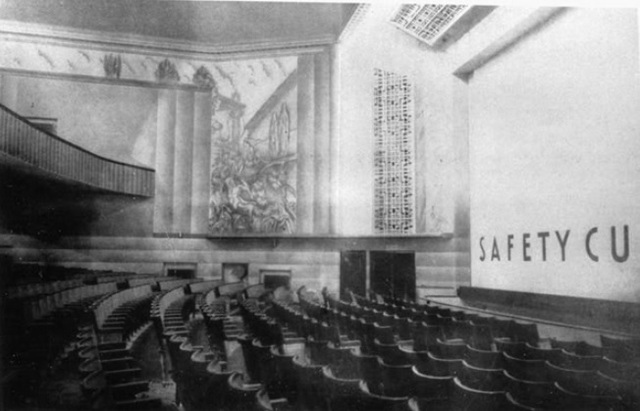
The Kettering Savoy

The Kettering Savoy (previously, Coliseum Theatre; subsequently, Ohio Theatre; also known as The Savoy) was a theatre and cinema in Russell Street, Kettering, Northamptonshire, England.

== History ==
The Kettering Savoy was originally known as the Coliseum Theatre. It opened in 1910 in a building which had been built seven years earlier, but a fire gutted it in 1937. The theatre was rebuilt and reopened on 21 May 1938 with a screening of the Hollywood film Big City (1937), starring Spencer Tracy and Luise Rainer, and a variety show on stage. Over the years, numerous stage productions were held in the theatre, and several prestigious actors appeared on stage here in their earlier careers. It was annexed by the Clifton Cinemas circuit on 25 August 1944, and the Northampton Repertory Company were based there between 1949 and 1951; it was described as the Northampton Repertory Theatre's outpost. In 1951, a Lionel Hamilton production of The Romantic Young Lady, from the Spanish of Gregorio Martínez Sierra, starring Jean Charlesworth, Peter Bell and Ronald Radd was put on at the Savoy. In 1951, Jim Dale made his stage debut as a stand-up comedian at the theatre, and was discovered there by Carroll Levis.

The Savoy struggled to stay open as a theatre throughout the year and in April 1953, it was reported that stage shows would cease during the summer months and it would begin functioning as a cinema throughout the week as well as weekends, too. The Kettering Savoy closed in 1986 but reopened as the Ohio Theatre. It eventually closed in 1997 when the new Odeon Multiplex was built in the town, and it subsequently fell into a highly dilapidated state with frequent vandalism. It was targeted in an arson attack on 16 September 2011, and was finally bulldozed down in June 2014. A building with 23 one-room flats is planned to be built on the site.

== Architecture ==
The Kettering Savoy had 1150 seats. The stage measured 43 by 23 feet (13.1 m × 7.0 m) in width and depth; its height was 60 feet (18 m). Grecian murals decorated the interior, with "concealed lighting and elaborated ventilation grills down the sides and above the rectangular proscenium." There were seven dressing rooms and a band room. In 1968, it was split, with a small cinema of 485 seats, known as The Studio, and the stage becoming a bingo hall. Five years later, in 1973, the screen was split into two, dividing the cinema into Studio 1 and 2, with 160 and 140 seats respectively.
