= Cradle Song =

Cradle Song may refer to:

- A cradle song or lullaby, a soothing children's song usually played before sleep

== Literature ==
- "A Cradle Song", a poem of William Blake written c.1791-92, set to music in 1947 by Benjamin Britten in his song cycle A Charm of Lullabies
- "A Cradle Song" (W. B. Yeats poem)
- Cradle Song, a 2003 detective novel by Robert Edric

== Film ==
- Cradle Song (1933 film), Paramount Pictures film starring Dorothea Wieck, Evelyn Venable and Guy Standing
- Cradle Song (1953 film), Mexican film
- Cradle Song (1960 film), release on Hallmark Hall of Fame starring Judith Anderson, Evelyn Varden and Siobhan McKenna
- Cradle Song (1994 film), Spanish film

== Music ==
=== Albums ===
- Cradle Song (album), a 1993 album by cellist Julian Lloyd Webber
- Cradlesong (album), a 2009 album by Rob Thomas

=== Classical ===
- Wiegenlied (Brahms) or Cradle Song, a lied for voice and piano by Johannes Brahms
- Cradle Song, for organ by Herbert Sumsion
- "Cradle Song", carol by Richard Causton
- An adaptation of the tune for "Sweet Afton", also used sometimes for the song "Away in a Manger"
- "Cradle Song", a 1922 song by Muriel Herbert
- "Cradle Song", List of compositions by Modest Mussorgsky
- "Cradle Song", Gordon Jacob

== See also ==
- Canción de cuna (disambiguation)
