= Canción de cuna =

Canción de cuna, literally "lullaby" in Spanish, may refer to:

- Canción de cuna (play), a 1911 play by Gregorio Martínez Sierra
- Canción de cuna (1941 film), a 1941 Argentine film based on the play
- Canción de cuna (1953 film), a 1953 Mexican film directed by Fernando de Fuentes
- Canción de cuna (1994 film), a 1994 Spanish film directed by José Luis Garci

== See also ==
- Cradle song (disambiguation)
