= Peter Bell (actor) =

British stage actor and producer

Peter Bell was a British stage actor and producer. In 1951 he appeared opposite Jean Charlesworth and Ronald Radd in a Lionel Hamilton production of The Romantic Young Lady at the Kettering Savoy. He was employed by the Northampton Repertory Company in the early 1950s, but by 1953 had appeared to have moved on. His wife, Mary Honer, was involved with training young actors on stage in Northampton. In 1950, Bell and Jack Livesey produced youth productions of Stanley Houghton's comedy The Dear Departed and Ian Haly's farce The Crimson Coconut at Towcester Town Hall.

Bell and Honer married in Stratford-on-Avon in 1944.
