= Ellen Maria Huntington Gates =

American poet

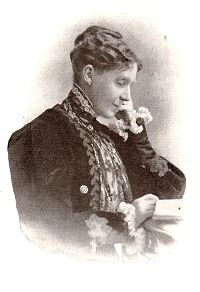
- Ellen M. H. Gates
- Born: Ellen Maria Huntington; 12 August 1835; Torrington, Connecticut, USA
- Died: 22 October 1920 (aged 85); New York City, USA
- Other names: Ellen Huntington, Ellen M. H. Gates, Ellen M. Gates, Ellen H. Gates
- Notable work: Your Mission, The Prodigal Child, The Home of the Soul, Eternity (O, The Clanging Bells of Time)
- Relatives: Collis Potter Huntington (brother), Helen Gates (daughter); Archer Milton Huntington (son-in-law); Harley Granville-Barker (son-in-law); Huntington family

Ellen Maria Huntington Gates (12 August 1835 – 22 October 1920) was an American hymnist and poet.

== Biography ==
Ellen Maria Huntington was born in Torrington, Connecticut. Her older brother, Collis Potter Huntington, became a famous railroad builder and businessman. She married Issac Edwin Gates, and lived with him in Elizabeth, New Jersey.

She began writing poems and hymns which were published in various magazines and in her published books including Night, At Noontide, The Treasures of Kurium, and To the Unborn Peoples. Another book of her poems, The Marble House and Other Poems, was published posthumously. Some of her most well known hymns and poems include Your Mission, The Prodigal Child, The Home of the Soul, and Eternity (also known as O, The Clanging Bells of Time)

Her hymn Your Mission was sung by evangelical song writer Philip Phillips at the gathering of the United States Christian Commission in Washington, D.C. at the start of the American Civil War. Abraham Lincoln, who was in attendance, loved it so much he requested it be sung twice. Afterwards it became known as "President Lincoln's favourite hymn."

According to one writer, Gates had a "reputation as one of the few didactic poets whose exquisite art wins a hearing for them everywhere" and that her hymns were "much admired and loved, both for their sweetness and elevated religious feeling, and for their poetic quality."

After the death of her husband, Isaac Edwin Gates, she moved to New York City, where she lived until her death on 22 October 1920.
