= Lionel Hamilton =

English theater director and actor

Lionel Frederick Baugham Hamilton (born 1910/11 – 28 January 2002) was an English theatre director and actor, director of the Northampton Repertory Company in Northampton, England. Much of his work was conducted at the Northampton Repertory Theatre and the Kettering Savoy in the late 1940s and 1950s.

== Directing ==
As part of the Northampton Repertory Theatre, in 1951, Hamilton put on a production of The Romantic Young Lady at the Kettering Savoy, starring Jean Charlesworth, Peter Bell and Ronald Radd. Glyn Idris Jones said that he was "not the most brilliant of directors but a delightfully pleasant man and, competent, I suppose, would be the right word. Even if they lacked imagination, his productions were clean, professional, and at least he didn't always abide by French's acting editions." Upon the resignation of John Ellin as general manager of the Northampton Repertory Theatre in May 1954, Hamilton assumed his position, having already become acting director of productions of the theatre company at the time.

During World War II, Hamilton was attached to the British military's 02E unit, Headquarters Malta Command, where he produced Men in Shadows. Here, Hamilton worked with Spike Milligan.

== Acting ==
Described as a "hammy actor", Hamilton acted in several plays, including Oscar Wilde's An Ideal Husband at the Northampton Repertory Theatre with Jonathan Adams, Marion McNaughton, and Valerie Bond. At the end of 1949, he starred as Arthur Gosport in the Harlequinade at the Northampton Repertory Theatre and Kettering Savoy. In 1952, he played various roles in the Theatre Royal, Nottingham production of Agatha Christie's The Mousetrap. At Christmas 1954, Hamilton starred as Dame Whittington opposite John Scott and Tenniel Evans in a production of the pantomime Dick Whittington at the Northampton Repertory Theatre. He also appeared in the ITV Play of the Week (1964) and BBC Play of the Month (1968) and in two episodes of the 1966 serial David Copperfield as Mr. Jorkins.
