= Primavera en otoño =

1933 film directed by Eugene Forde

- Directed by: Eugene Forde
- Written by: Gregorio Martínez Sierra (play); José López Rubio; John Reinhardt
- Produced by: John Stone
- Starring: Catalina Bárcena
- Cinematography: Robert Planck
- Production company: Fox Film
- Release dates: March 21, 1933 (Premiere-Barcelona); May 18, 1933 (New York City)
- Running time: 75 minutes

Primavera en otoño is a 1933 Spanish-language American romantic comedy directed by Eugene Forde and stars Catalina Bárcena.

== Plot ==
Agustina has been away at school when she returns home to Madrid to see the mother she hasn't seen in over eight years. Delighted at the visit, Agustina's mother, Elena, is dismayed at her daughter's conservative appearance. Elena re-does Agustina's dress, which Agustina's boyfriend, Manolo, disapproves of when he arrives the next day. When Agustina's father Enrique arrives to woo Elena to return to him, he sees that the only way that Manolo's parents will approve of his marriage to Agustina is if he can remove Agustina from Elena's influence. He invites Elena to return with him to his ranch, but Elena wishes to remain in Madrid and pursue her opera career. The two live apart so that Enrique can see to his ranch while she pursues her career.

Agustina guilts her mother into going to the ranch, and the two, along with a coterie of Elena's friends, as well as Manolo, travel to visit Enrique. The large group quickly makes themselves at home. As the group cavorts scantily clad outfits, Manolo is angered by Agustina's lack of decorum. Agustina leaves in a huff, followed by a friend of her mother's, Juan Manuel, an attaché of the Brazilian Embassy in Madrid. Caught in a storm, the couple seeks shelter in the caretaker's cottage on Enrique's farm.

Meanwhile, Enrique orders Elena's friends to leave his ranch, which they do, however Elena begins to pack to follow them. When Juan and Agustina return to the main house, Juan seeks out Elena to tell her that he has fallen in love with her daughter. Delighted at the news, she embraces him, which is seen by Enrique, who gets the wrong impression and orders Juan from his home. However Juan returns the next morning and proposes to Agustina, she accepts and the two leave on their way to Juan's next post in Tokyo.

Enrique, realizing his mistaken jealousy, chases after Elena, who is about to board a steamship. Knowing they love one another, but not knowing whether they should return to the ranch or to Madrid, they flip a coin. When it lands in the water, they decide to split their time between the two.

== Cast ==
- Catalina Bárcena as Elena Montero
- Antonio Moreno as Enrique
- Mimi Aguglia as Rosina
- Luana Alcañiz as Agustina
- Julio Peña as Manolo Fresneda
- María Calvo as Ama Justa
- Agostino Borgato as Empresario
- Hilda Moreno as Nena Torres
- Raúl Roulien as Juan Manuel Valladares
- Romualdo Tirado as Antonio
- Adrienne D'Ambricourt as Montresor
