= Helen Manchester Gates =

American writer, translator, and dramatist (1874–1948)

Helen Manchester Gates was an American writer, translator, and dramatist, best known for her English translations of Spanish-language plays. She became known by her married names, Helen Huntingdon and Helen Granville-Barker, and was involved in literary and theatrical circles on both sides of the Atlantic.

In particular she translated plays by María Lejárraga, often published under the name Gregorio Martínez Sierra. Her translations were staged (for example, The Romantic Young Lady in London in 1920 and The Kingdom of God in Dublin in 1924), contributing to the international reception of Lejárraga's work.

== Early life ==
Born in Beaver Dam, Wisconsin, she was the daughter of Congregationalist minister Rev. Isaac Edwin Gates and poet Ellen M. H. Gates. Her father was born in Cornwall, England, and her mother in Connecticut.

Her parents moved to New Jersey where her father was employed as private secretary to his brother-in-law, the railway magnate Collis Potter Huntington.

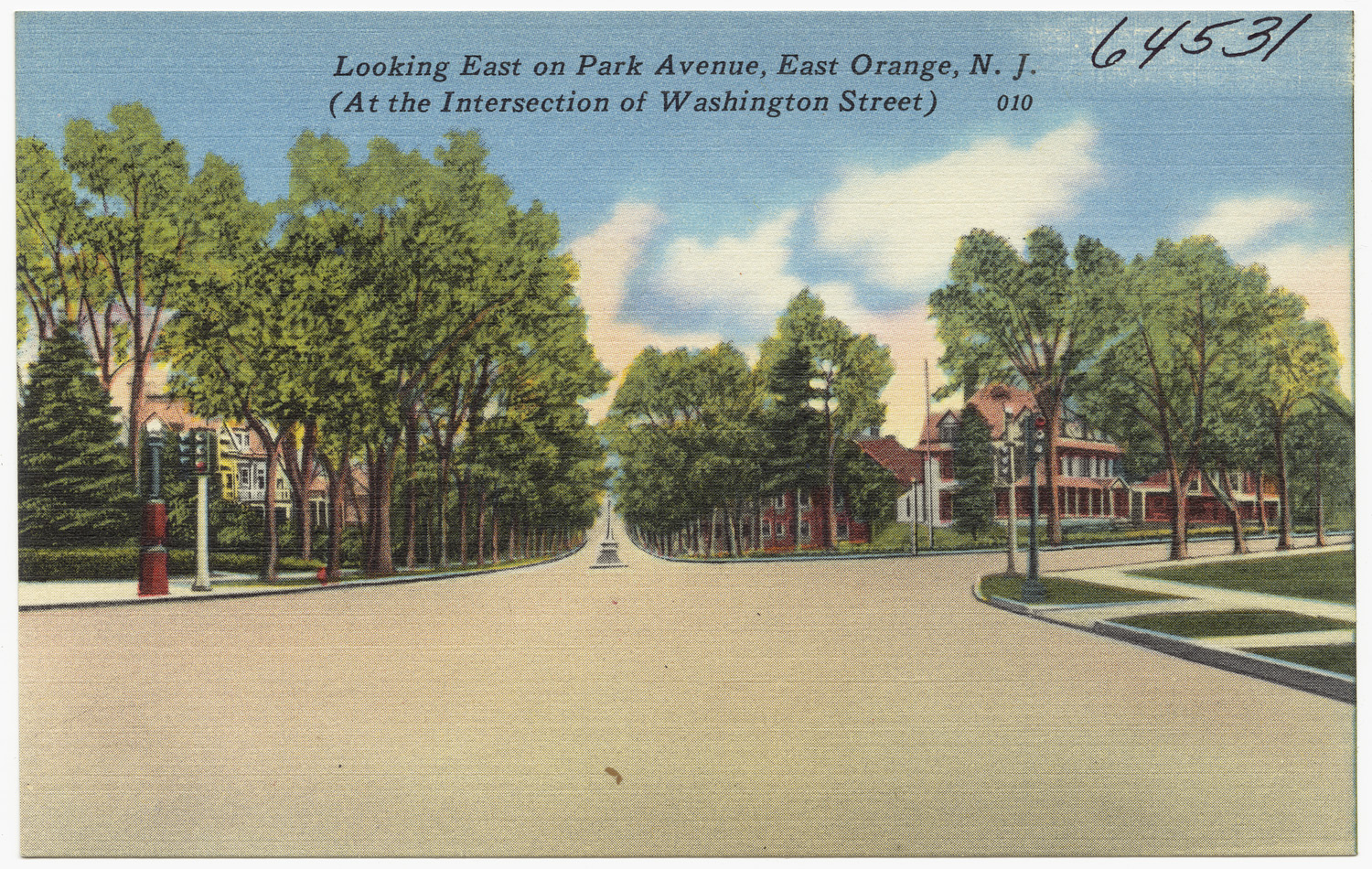
East Orange, New Jersey

== First marriage ==
Helen remained in New Jersey after her marriage to Thomas Criss, an accountant. He also worked for Collis Potter Huntingdon.

Their daughter Mildred was born in 1890. (Mildred went on to publish Pocahontas, young American princess and other works).

The marriage lasted until 1895 when Helen obtained a divorce. The divorce was reported in the Boston Post which commented that the couple was well known in East Orange, but the grounds for divorce were not public knowledge.

== Second marriage ==
Helen married Archer Milton Huntington in 1895. The ceremony took place in London at a fashionable Anglican church, St George's, Hanover Square. In theory the Church of England was at the time strictly opposed to remarriage after divorce, but sometimes exceptions were made.

The bride and groom may have been cousins: the identity of Archer's father is not clear. Archer's mother married Collis Potter Huntington (Helen's uncle) when Archer was a child. Collis recognised Archer as his adopted son, but they had different interests. Archer did not involve himself much in the family railroad business. Archer was interested in Spanish culture and became a collector of Spanish books and art. Collis was a collector of paintings himself, and was supportive of Archer´s interests in the arts. Collis presented Archer with the portrait of Fernando Álvarez de Toledo, 3rd Duke of Alba by Anthonis Mor. This painting and others passed to the Hispanic Society of America founded by Archer in 1904.

Helen published Folk Songs from the Spanish (New York: G.P. Putnam's Sons, 1900).

== Third marriage ==
Helen left Archer Huntingdon for Harley Granville-Barker who had been a major figure in British theatre in the Edwardian period. They began an affair in New York, where Granville-Barker was producing a play. After the divorces had gone through (from Archer and Lillah McCarthy), they married in London. Like her second wedding the ceremony was in Mayfair, this time at a Congregationalist church called King's Weigh House. The Granville Barkers settled in France where Harley was director of the British Institute in Paris. They spent the Second World War in New York. Helen remained married to Harley until his death in Paris in 1946. Helen died in 1950. They were both buried in Paris.

== Play translations ==
Spanish plays were rarely performed in London between 1909 and 1919, although Spanish playwrights tended to be prolific and there was scope for introducing their work. Rather than Spanish Golden Age theatre, Helen was interested in contemporary plays which can be seen as belonging to a "Silver Age" given the literary richness of the epoch.

=== Martínez Sierra ===
With Harley she translated some of the relatively new plays then attributed to Gregorio Martínez Sierra (it has since been established that much of the output of Gregorio was written by his wife María Lejárraga).

The Granville-Barkers were not the only translators interested in Martínez Sierra plays. In 1922/23 a two-volume set was published with one volume by the Granville-Barkers and one volume by the American translator John Garrett Underhill (who also translated Golden Age plays). The Granville-Barkers were quicker in getting their translations on the stage and in 1920 Harley directed a production of what appears to be their first translation, The Romantic Young Lady (Spanish: Sueño de una noche de agosto). It ran at the Royalty Theatre in the West End of London.

There was quite a lot of interest outside Spain in staging these plays, although they became less fashionable after 1950.

==== Productions in Ireland ====
In many ways María Lejárraga was a progressive figure (she was elected to Congress as a Socialist Party representative for Granada). However, at least some "Martínez Sierra" plays were identified in the 1920s as reflecting the values of a Catholic society. Sometimes the religious connection is obvious. For example, "The Two Shepherds" is about the retirement of a priest and his replacement by a younger man. Such plays seem to have had a special appeal in the Irish Free State which consciously sought to promote a cultural identity distinct from that of (largely Protestant) Great Britain. Even those plays which were not religious in subject were perceived as coming from a non-British culture, an advantage in the Irish context.

In 1924, the year the Abbey Theatre in Dublin staged the premiere of Juno and the Paycock, a play about the Irish Civil War, it also staged two Granville-Barker translations, The Two Shepherds (Spanish: Los pastores, 1913) and The Kingdom of God (Spanish: Reino de Dios, 1916). Sara Allgood played Juno in Juno and the Paycock, Doña Paquita in The Two Shepherds and Margarita in Kingdom of God. Eileen Crowe also appeared in all three plays.

By the end of the 1920s the Granville-Barker translations had a rival on the Irish stage with the appearance of the first Gaelic translations. Irish nationalists were keen to develop theatre in the Irish language, particularly in the west of the country, to help keep the language alive. The first Martínez Sierra play to be performed in Gaelic was Bean An Ghaiscidhigh (Spanish: La mujer del héroe; English: Wife to a famous man). It was produced at An Taibhdhearc, Galway in 1929 in a translation by Tomás Ó hÉighneacháin (alias O Higgins). Ó hÉighneacháin, who translated other plays available in Granville-Barker translations, may have used the English versions to some extent as a source. English translations of Sierra Martinez plays continued to be performed in Ireland until around 1950.

==== Productions in the USA ====
The Kingdom of God was successfully staged in New York in 1929.

=== Quintero brothers ===
The Granville-Barkers also published translations of plays by the brothers Alvarez Quintero such as "A Hundred Years Old" (El Centenario). In 1928 Peggy Ashcroft appeared in a production at the Lyric Theatre (Hammersmith).
