= Las golondrinas (zarzuela) =

Zarzuela by José María Usandizaga

Las golondrinas is a zarzuela by José María Usandizaga. The libretto was written by Gregorio Martínez Sierra and María Lejárraga.

Las golondrinas premiered on February 5, 1914, at the Teatro Circo Price in Madrid.
