= Los hombres las prefieren viudas =

- Film poster
- Directed by: Gregorio Martínez Sierra
- Written by: Pedro E. Pico (play), Cayetano Córdova Iturburu
- Starring: Catalina Bárcena
- Cinematography: Fulvio Testi
- Edited by: Carlos Rinaldi
- Music by: Julián Bautista
- Production company: Estudios San Miguel
- Release date: July 21, 1943
- Running time: 62 minutes
- Country: Argentina
- Language: Spanish

Los hombres las prefieren viudas (Men Prefer Widows) is a 1943 Argentine film, directed by Gregorio Martínez Sierra and starring Catalina Bárcena, Santiago Gómez Cou and Alita Román.

The film, made by Estudios San Miguel, is based on the play of the same name by Pedro E. Pico. It premiered in Buenos Aires on July 21, 1943. The film was remade in Spain in 1970, with the same title, by León Klimovsky.

== Plot ==
A single, middle-aged woman pretends to be a widow to find a husband, but the man she claims to be her deceased "husband" reappears alive, complicating her situation.

== Cast ==
- Catalina Bárcena
- Santiago Gómez Cou
- Alita Román
- Rosa Catá
- Rosa Rosen
- Marcial Manent
- Oscar Villa
- Francisco López Silva
- Iris Portillo
- Perla Mux
- Mario Faig
- Max Citelli
- Miguel Ligero
- Muguet-Albaicín
- Alberto D'Salvio

== Release ==
The film was theatrically released in Argentina on 21 July 1943.

== Reception ==
La Nación described the film as "a nice comedy with a confident and lively execution". In a review for El Mundo, Calki called it a "light and friendly comedy... there is nothing profound in its content: it is just a lightweight comedy... that inspires you to have a good time".
