= List of Talking Pictures episodes =

British television series

Talking Pictures is an occasional BBC Two television series which examines the lives and careers of well-known actors, as well as exploring various cinematic themes and genres. Episodes largely comprise interview clips from the BBC archives and vary in length between 30 and 60 minutes. With just two exceptions, the first 66 episodes were narrated by actress Sylvia Syms (2013–2019), following which the role was taken over by Celia Imrie (2020 onwards). Prior to 2025, On the Waterfront was the only film to have been the subject of an episode in its own right. Since then, each episode has been devoted to a single movie (or in one case, The Godfather trilogy). Episode 64 is notable in that it did not cover an aspect of the film-making industry itself, but rather was a look back at the career of film critic and longtime presenter of the BBC Film... programme, Barry Norman, who had died earlier in 2017. Sylvia Syms was the episode's narrator. Sue Wilkinson of the Yorkshire Evening Post praised Coward's responses to questions in the documentary as "pithy and witty".

== Episodes ==
Since the BBC does not group episodes into distinct series on the programme website, they are listed below in strict chronological order (according to the date when an episode was first shown). Episodes have been repeated on an ad hoc basis at fairly regular intervals, but the complete series (as it stands currently) has never been shown sequentially.

No.	Date first shown	Subject
1	5 January 2013	Bette Davis
2	12 January 2013	John Mills
3	19 January 2013	David Niven
4	2 February 2013	Gene Kelly
5	16 February 2013	John Wayne
6	23 February 2013	Tony Curtis
7	2 March 2013	Dirk Bogarde
8	9 March 2013	James Stewart
9	29 March 2013	Lauren Bacall
10	1 April 2013	Orson Welles
11	27 April 2013	Ingrid Bergman
12	11 May 2013	Alec Guinness
13	6 July 2013	Gregory Peck
14	3 August 2013	James Mason
15	26 August 2013	Charlton Heston
16	12 October 2013	Fred Astaire and Ginger Rogers
17	2 November 2013	Richard Burton
18	1 March 2014	Alfred Hitchcock
19	8 March 2014	Shirley MacLaine
20	12 April 2014	Joan Fontaine
21	3 May 2014	Richard Attenborough
22	10 May 2014	Deborah Kerr
23	17 May 2014	Laurence Olivier
24	24 May 2014	Sophia Loren
25	26 May 2014	Paul Newman
26	31 May 2014	Robert Mitchum
27	19 July 2014	Peter O'Toole
28	2 August 2014	Robert Redford
29	23 August 2014	David Lean
30	13 September 2014	Judi Dench
31	20 September 2014	Maggie Smith
32	28 December 2014	Julie Andrews
33	10 January 2015	Michael Caine
34	17 January 2015	Sean Connery
35	7 February 2015	Jack Lemmon
36	14 February 2015	Shelley Winters
37	21 February 2015	On the Waterfront
38	28 February 2015	Albert Finney
39	7 March 2015	Noël Coward
40	14 March 2015	Kenneth More
41	4 April 2015	Hollywood's Great Directors
42	25 April 2015	Richard Harris
43	9 May 2015	Hitchcock’s Leading Actors
44	11 July 2015	Christopher Lee
45	15 August 2015	Omar Sharif
46	29 August 2015	Musicals
47	31 August 2015	Anthony Hopkins
48	18 August 2015	John Huston
49	24 October 2015	Hollywood Actresses
50	31 October 2015	Great British Comedies
51	21 November 2015	Child Stars
52	2 January 2016	Sex Symbols
53	26 March 2016	War Films
54	27 August 2016	Bing Crosby
55	12 November 2016	The Black Stars of Film
56	1 January 2017	Alan Rickman
57	31 January 2017	Debbie Reynolds
58	18 February 2017	John Hurt
59	29 April 2017	60s Icons
60	28 October 2017 (Note: This episode (which was narrated by actor Warwick Davis) appears to have been completed but, for reasons which are not entirely clear, was never actually shown - except, perhaps, in one or two regions. To the apparent dismay of some Potter fans, it seems to have been supplanted in the schedule by an episode of Grand Tours of Scotland's Lochs and was not given an alternative time slot.)	Harry Potter
61	16 December 2017	Roger Moore
62	17 December 2017	Jane Fonda
63	23 February 2017	Bette and Joan (Note: That is to say, the legendary rivalry between actresses Bette Davis and Joan Crawford (also the subject of eight-part TV drama series Feud, first shown on BBC Two beginning in December 2017).)
64	30 December 2017 (Note: Narrated by impressionist and comedian Rory Bremner.)	Barry Norman
65	30 March 2018	Epics
66	15 September 2019	Westerns
67	15 February 2020	Rom Coms
68	4 April 2020	70s Legends
69	23 May 2020	Joan Collins
70	6 December 2020	Christmas Classics (Note: Features clips from The Shop Around the Corner (1940), Holiday Inn (1942), It's a Wonderful Life (1946), Miracle on 34th Street (1947 original and 1994 remake), A Charlie Brown Christmas (1965), Scrooge (1970), The Snowman (1982), Gremlins (1984), Die Hard (1988), Home Alone (1990), The Muppet Christmas Carol (1992), Elf (2003), Love Actually (2003), and Nativity! (2009). Also extracts of interviews with Fred Astaire (1976), Richard Attenborough (1994), James Caan (2003), Bing Crosby (1972), Macaulay Culkin (1990), Richard Curtis (2003), Will Ferrell (2003), Albert Finney (1970), Martin Freeman (2009), Brian Henson with Muppets Gonzo and Kermit (1992), Debbie Isitt (2009), Ronald Neame (1970), James Stewart (1972 and 1973), and Bruce Willis (1988).)
71	28 December 2020	Agatha Christie (Note: Includes clips from The Alphabet Murders (1965), Appointment with Death (1988), Death on the Nile (1978 original and 2022 remake). Murder Ahoy! (1964), Murder on the Orient Express (1974 and 2017 versions), Murder, She Said (1961), and Witness for the Prosecution (1957). Also features interviews with Lauren Bacall (1974), Kenneth Branagh (2017), Albert Finney (1992), Derek Jacobi with Olivia Colman (2017), Charles Laughton (1958), Sidney Lumet, Margaret Rutherford (1962), Peter Ustinov (1978 and 1988), and Billy Wilder.)
72	1 January 2021	Great Dames (Note: Features interviews with Judi Dench (2002), Helen Mirren (1975), Diana Rigg (1976 and 1980), Maggie Smith (1967 and 1993), Emma Thompson (1996), and Julie Walters (1984 and 2010). Also includes news footage of Julie Andrews and Elizabeth Taylor receiving their honours from the Queen on the same day in 2000.)
73	30 May 2021	War Stories (Note: Includes clips from 1917 (2019), Apocalypse Now (1979), American Sniper (2014), Battle of Britain (1969), Born on the Fourth of July (1989), The Dirty Dozen (1967), Dunkirk (2017), Escape to Victory (1981), The Hurt Locker (2008), The Great Escape (1963), The Guns of Navarone (1961), Where Eagles Dare (1968), and Zero Dark Thirty (2012). Also features excerpts of interviews with Kathryn Bigelow (2013), Richard Burton (1977), Michael Caine (1969 and 1981), Francis Ford Coppola (1985), Tom Cruise (2005), Clint Eastwood (1977 and 2015), Stewart Granger (1981), Ron Kovic (1980), Lee Marvin (1980), Sam Mendes (2019), Bobby Moore (1981), David Niven (1962), Gregory Peck (1986), Pelé (1981), Sylvester Stallone (1981 and 1985), John Sturges (1989), and Harry Styles with Fionn Whitehead (2017).)
74	12 June 2021	Marvellous Musicals
75	4 September 2021	Film's Family Favourites
76	2 April 2022	Perfect Partners
77	7 May 2022	Meryl Streep
78	30 December 2023	Glenda Jackson
79	4 January 2024	Dustin Hoffman
80	5 June 2025	Spartacus (Note: The first broadcast of this episode was scheduled before a showing of Spartacus on BBC Four, coinciding with the 100th anniversary of the birth of Tony Curtis.)
81	21 August 2025	The Silence of the Lambs
82	28 August 2025	The Godfather Trilogy
83	11 December 2025	Psycho
84	31 December 2025	Jaws
85	19 February 2026	Bonnie and Clyde (Note: Includes exceprts of interviews with Warren Beatty (1967), Arthur Penn (1967), Faye Dunaway (2008), Gene Wilder (1975), and Gene Hackman (1986).)
86	28 May 2026	Marilyn Monroe
87	30 July 2026	70s Legends Part II
88	17 October 2026	World Cinema Classics
89	21 November 2026	Catherine Deneuve

Last updated 11 November 2026.

Transcripts and downloadable subtitles of some episodes in SRT/ASS (SSA) format are available from the Subsaga website.
