= Mimi Aguglia =

Italian actress (1884–1970)

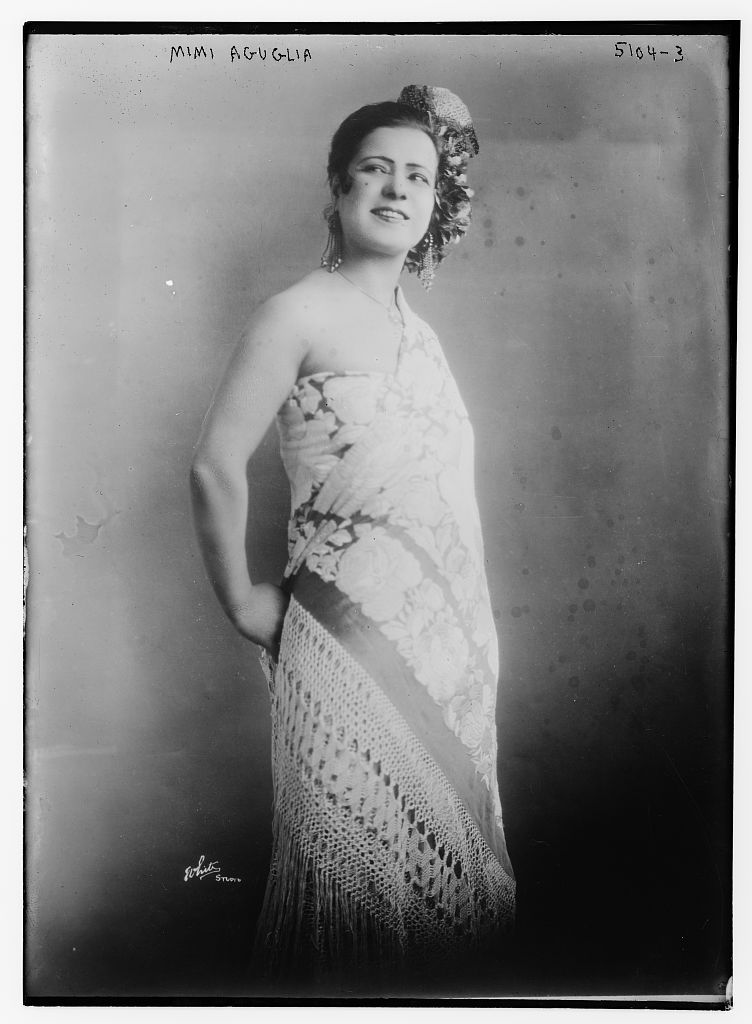
- Born: Girolama Aguglia; 21 December 1884; Palermo, Sicily, Italy
- Died: 31 July 1970 (aged 85); Woodland Hills, California, U.S.
- Other name: Mimi Aguglia-Ferraú
- Occupation: Actress
- Children: 3, including Argentina Brunetti

Mimi Aguglia (21 December 1884 – 31 July 1970), born Girolama Aguglia, was an Italian actress who found success in Hollywood as a character actress, often playing immigrant matriarchs. She also worked in Italian-language radio in the United States.

== Early life ==
Aguglia was born in the wings of the St. Cecile Theatre in Palermo on 21 December 1884, while her mother, actress Giuseppina Di Lorenzo Aguglia, was playing Desdemona in Othello. Her father was actor Ignazio Aguglia. "I have never studied for the stage at all," she told The New York Times in 1908. "I am the daughter of artists and was born an artist."

== Career ==
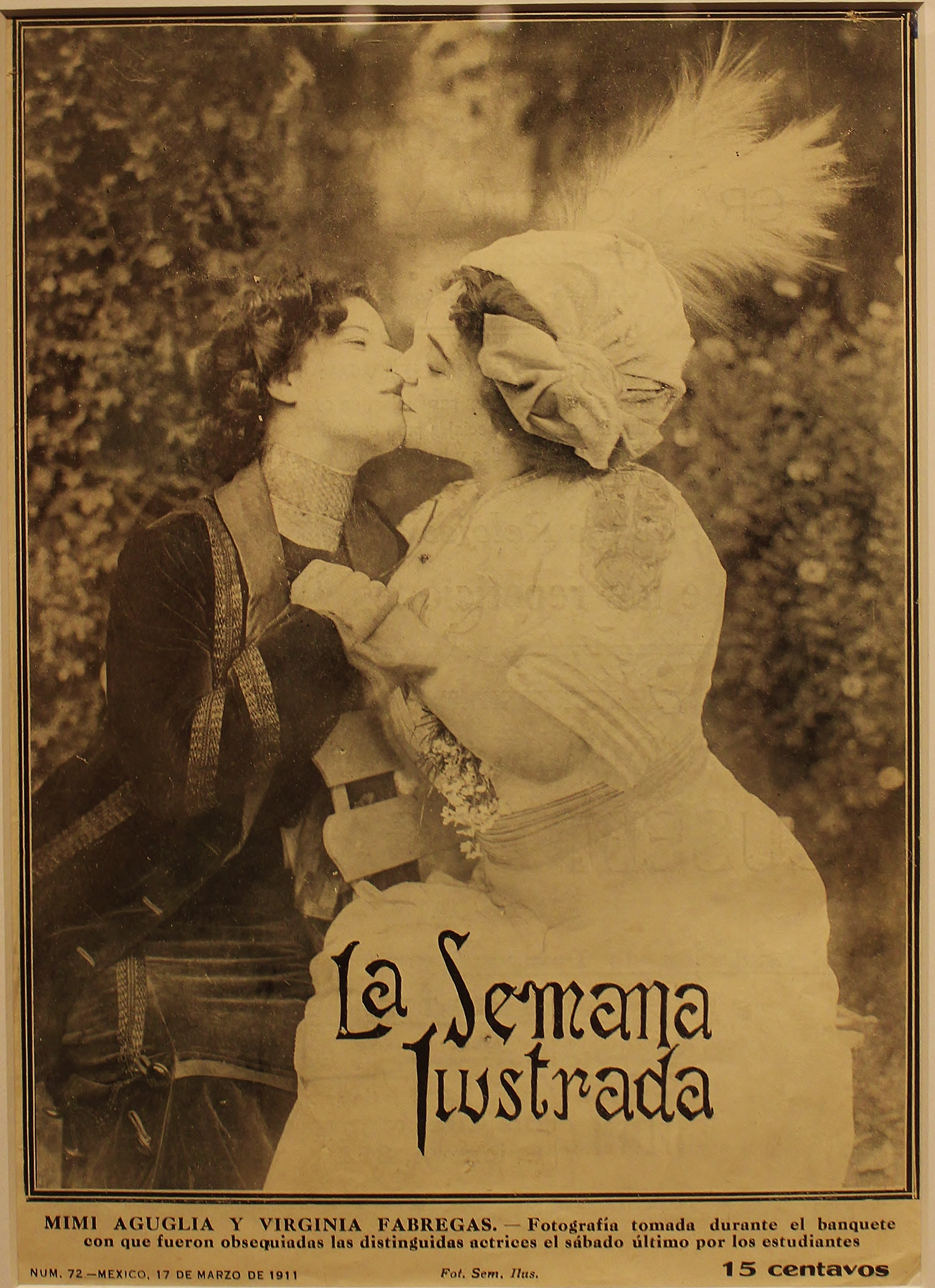
Mexican actress Virginia Fábregas and Aguglia kissing in 1911

Aguglia became an actress in her own right, touring in Europe, North Africa, and South America from a young age. Edmondo de Amicis described her as "a hundred demons in a little body with an angel face." She appeared in London in a Sicilian drama, La zolfara, and in Cavalleria rusticana and Morte civile, all in 1908. Her American stage debut came later in 1908, starring in Malia, a Sicilian tragedy. She returned to New York in 1913, performing Salome and Electra in Italian with her own company. Djuna Barnes said of Aguglia in 1913 that she "entered into America as spice and pepper into a good pot roast."

Aguglia studied English to broaden her opportunities on the American stage. From the 1930s until her death Aguglia was a working character actress in Hollywood. She also had one Broadway credit, in The Whirlwind (1919–1920). She recorded two songs in Italian for the Columbia label in 1926. She played in The Goldbergs on CBS radio in the early 1940s. She also worked at radio station WOV, broadcasting in Italian.

== Personal life ==
Aguglia married director Vincenzo Ferraú in 1906, and had three children, two of whom worked in radio. Her daughter Argentina Brunetti (1907–2005), born in Buenos Aires, was also an actress. Her husband died in 1942, and Aguglia died in 1970, at the age of 85, in Woodland Hills, California.

== Selected filmography ==
- The Last Man on Earth (1924)
- Primavera en otoño (1933)
- The Outlaw (1943)
- Carnival in Costa Rica (1947)
- Captain from Castile (1947)
- Cry of the City (1948)
- That Midnight Kiss (1949)
- Deported (1950)
- Right Cross (1950)
- The Man Who Cheated Himself (1950)
- Cuban Fireball (1951)
- The Rose Tattoo (1955)
