= The Iceman Cometh (The Play of the Week) =

- The Play of the Week episodes
- Broadway Theatre Archive recording DVD cover
- Episode nos.: Season 2 Episodes 8 and 9
- Directed by: Sidney Lumet
- Written by: Eugene O'Neill
- Original air dates: November 14, 1960 (Part 1); November 21, 1960 (Part 2)
- Running time: 102 minutes (Part 1); 106 minutes (Part 2)

Guest appearances
- Jason Robards; Myron McCormick; and in order of appearance: Tom Pedi; James Broderick; Farrell Pelly; Robert Redford; Ronald Radd; Roland Winters; Harrison Dowd; Michael Strong

Episode chronology
← Previous "Two by Saroyan—Once Around the Block and My Heart's in the Highlands"	Next → "Leonard Sillman's Highlights of New Faces"

"The Iceman Cometh" is a 1960 television production of the 1946 Eugene O'Neill play of the same title. Two separate parts were originally broadcast as episodes of The Play of the Week by the television network and syndication service the NTA Film Network (or NTA).

== Cast ==
- Jason Robards as Theodore "Hickey" Hickman
- Myron McCormick as Larry Slade
- Tom Pedi as Rocky Pioggi
- James Broderick as Willie Oban
- Farrell Pelly as Harry Hope
- Robert Redford as Don Parritt
- Ronald Radd as Captain Cecil Lewis
- Roland Winters as The General Piet Wetjoen
- Harrison Dowd as James "Jimmy" Tomorrow
- Michael Strong as Chuck Morello
- Sorrell Booke as Hugo Kalmar
- Maxwell Glanville as Joe Mott
- Charles White as Lieutenant Pat "Mac" McGloin
- Walter Klavun as Ed Mosher
- Hildy Brooks as Margie
- Julie Bovasso as Pearl
- Herb Voland as Moran
- Joan Copeland as Cora
