= Olivia Irving =

British actress

- Olivia Irving, from a 1955 newspaper photo
- Born: 6 September 1934; Buenos Aires, Argentina
- Died: 29 May 1962 (age 27); Canary Islands
- Occupation: Actress

Olivia Rose Irving (6 September 1934 – 29 May 1962) was a British actress. Her disappearance while at sea was the subject of a government inquiry and significant press coverage in June 1962.

== Early life and education ==
Irving was born in Buenos Aires, Argentina, one of the three daughters of Sir Stanley Gordon Irving and Irene Hazel Maclean Irving. Her father was a British diplomat frequently based in Latin America. She trained for a theatrical career at the Royal Academy of Dramatic Art, and with actress Ellen Pollock.

== Career ==
Irving was a skilled horsewoman and athlete with a "daring temperament". She performed with the Saville Players, and in the musical comedy The Quaker Girl. She was especially well-reviewed in the show No Room at the Inn, in Wales in 1953: "her self-possession and stage technique are amazing when one realises that she is only 19 years of age," commented the newspaper in Pontypridd, adding that "it is evident she has a brilliant future ahead of her". In 1956 she played Phebe in As You Like It in London. She appeared in several BBC television movies in the mid-1950s, including The Olive Jar (1955), The Romantic Young Lady (1955), The Laboratory (1955), The Case of Mr. Pelham (1955), Legend of Pepito (1955), and the series Sailor of Fortune (1958).

== Disappearance at sea ==
Irving had a medical history of "high excitement to deep depression", and was under treatment after a car accident. She went missing at sea near the Equator, while traveling on the transatlantic liner Aragon from Argentina to the Canary Islands in May 1962. She was presumed dead by drowning after her shoes and other items were found on the deck, near a railing. She was 27 years old, and engaged to Nathaniel Mayer Green, a London physician. The Ministry of Transport opened an inquiry into her disappearance, and her "profound emotional disturbance" was considered a significant factor.
