= Michael Strong =

American actor (1918–1980)

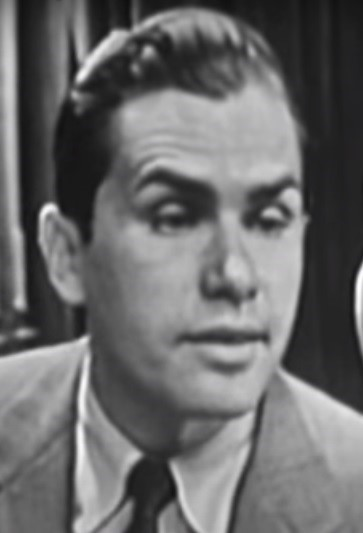
- Born: Cecil Natapoff; February 8, 1918; New York City, New York, U.S.
- Died: September 17, 1980 (aged 62); Los Angeles, California, U.S.
- Education: Brooklyn College (BA)
- Occupation: Actor
- Years active: 1937–1980
- Spouse(s): Theda Kropf (?–1966); Diane Shalet (?–1980; his death)

Michael Strong (born Cecil Natapoff; February 8, 1918 – September 17, 1980) was an American stage, film and television actor.

== Early life ==
Michael Strong was born in New York City as Cecil Natapoff, the son of Russian-Jewish parents who emigrated to the U.S. in 1903, fleeing the pogroms of Russia. He grew up in the Bronx. His father was a mail carrier. Michael Strong served in the U.S. Army during World War II.

He attended Brooklyn College and was a member of the Brooklyn College Varsity Dramatic Society, appearing in productions at local theaters and in radio performances. He graduated with a Bachelor of Arts degree in 1938.

== Career ==
While at Brooklyn College, he made his Broadway debut in 1937 in the short-lived production of Wall Street Scene. He also performed in Yiddish radio, and in 1941 changed his name to Michael Strong. After a stage career that included one of the principal roles in the play Men to the Sea, he was signed to a personal contract by Hal. B. Wallis at Paramount Pictures in 1945, and was slated to make his screen debut in the film The Searching Wind in the role created on stage by Montgomery Clift. Strong did not appear in the film.

He was a charter member of The Actors Studio.

Strong appeared in the 1949 stage and William Wyler's 1951 film version of Detective Story, playing a cat burglar, and was cast by Elia Kazan in supporting and ensemble roles, twice appeared in the opening night casts of plays by Arthur Miller. He played the bartender Chuck in Sidney Lumet’s televised adaptation of The Iceman Cometh in 1960. He appeared with Zero Mostel and Eli Wallach in an adaptation of Eugène Ionesco's Rhinoceros. he was the understudy for Jack Klugman in the 1959 Broadway production of the musical Gypsy.

Strong was a regular on live programming during the Golden Age of Television, including the Philco-Goodyear Television Playhouse, a showcase for young actors, and in early television series including Danger and Suspense. His performances in those shows were "admired for extracting feeling from the smallest gesture." He was a regular on the soap opera The Edge of Night.

In 1962, Kazan invited Strong, Jason Robards and other actors in forming the Repertory Theater of Lincoln Center. In its inaugural season in 1963-1964, he appeared in productions of Incident at Vichy and After the Fall.

He made guest appearances in over 120 television series during his career on shows such as The Green Hornet (in "Hornet Save Thyself"), Decoy, Naked City, The Eleventh Hour, The F.B.I., The Fugitive, I Spy, Mission: Impossible (five episodes), Columbo (in "Negative Reaction"), The Streets of San Francisco, The Big Valley, Planet of the Apes and Hawaii Five-O. He played Dr. Roger Korby in the Star Trek episode "What Are Little Girls Made Of?".

In 1975, Strong appeared in a production of The Dybbuk at the Mark Taper Forum in Los Angeles.

Among his film credits are Point Blank, Patton, and The Great Santini.

=== Chekhov film ===
Paul Newman was impressed by Strong's performance of a one-act Anton Chekhov monologue at the Actors Studio in 1959, and cast him in a starring role in a short film based on a Chekhov play of the same name, On the Harmfulness of Tobacco. The 25-minute film, which was shot in five days at the Orpheum, then a Yiddish theater, on the Lower East Side. was only given a short release at theaters in New York and Los Angeles. At its release, a brief New York Times review called it a “top-flight, one-man tour de force by Michael Strong.” It has been described as a "lost masterpiece."

Strong was regarded as an "actor's actor" by co-stars such as Kirk Douglas and Karl Malden. The Forward, in recounting the film in 2017, said "it’s hard not to wonder if he might have joined their ranks if this film had been released." In January 1962, Newman took his name off the film and declined to work on obtaining distribution, which crushed Strong. Newman told biographer Daniel O'Brien, "I did that as an exercise for myself... I did it to see whether I could handle a camera and direct actors." Newman "didn't think it had turned out that well." The film was shown in 2017 at Lincoln Center for the first time since 1962.

== Personal life and death ==
His first wife was Theda Kropf, a fellow acting student at Brooklyn College who became a kindergarten teacher. She and Strong taught theater at Camp Unity, an interracial summer camp for adults in Wingdale, New York. They divorced in 1966. His second wife was actress Diane Shalet, who was an actress and intern with the Lincoln Center troupe. He had two children with Kropf: Paul and Ellen Strong.

Strong died of stomach cancer in Los Angeles, California, on September 17, 1980, aged 62.

== Filmography ==
A partial filmography follows.

=== Film ===
Year	Title	Role	Notes
1950	The Sleeping City	Dr. Alex Connell	Uncredited
1951	Detective Story	Lewis Abbott	appeared on Broadway in same role
1962	On the Harmfulness of Tobacco	Ivan Ivanovich Nyukhin	directed by Paul Newman, considered a lost film
1966	Dead Heat on a Merry-Go-Round	Paul Feng	
1967	Point Blank	John "Big John" Stegman	
1968	Secret Ceremony	Dr. Walter Stevens	Uncredited
1970	Patton	Brigadier General Hobart Carver	
1979	The Great Santini	Colonel Varney	final film appearance

=== Television ===
Year	Title	Role	Notes
1960	Special for Women: The Trapped Housewife	Mike Ross	TV movie
1960	The Iceman Cometh	Chuck Morello	TV play
1963	The Alfred Hitchcock Hour	Mr. Malloy	Season 1 Episode 16: "What Really Happened"
1963	The Lieutenant	Peter Clay	"Cool of the evening" (S1E2)
1966	Gunsmoke	Shaver	"Snap Decision" (S12E1)
1966	Star Trek: The Original Series	Dr. Roger Korby	"What Are Little Girls Made Of?" (S1E7)
1967	Mission: Impossible	Barsky	"The Trial" (S1E18)
1967	Mission: Impossible	Stephan Gomalk	"Operation Heart" (S2E7)
1968	Mission: Impossible	Yorgi Petrosian	"The Emerald" (S2E18)
1970	Mission: Impossible	Police Chief Petrovitch	"Decoy" (S5E8)
1971	Hawaii Five-O	Fred Grayson	"Air Cargo ... Dial for Murder" (S4E7)
1971	The Immortal	Jason Richards	"My Brother's Keeper"" (S1E15)
1973	Gunsmoke	Peak Stratton	"Kimbro" (S18E21)
1973	Hawaii Five-O	Harry Maguire	"One Born Every Minute" (S6E17)
1974	Columbo	Sergeant Hoffman	"Negative Reaction" (S4E2)
1978	Quincy, M.E.	Mob Boss	"Passing" (S3E15)
1979	Archie Bunker's Place	Tony Bremmer	"A Small Mafia Favor" (S1E24)
