= Cradle Song (1933 film) =

1933 film

- Directed by: Mitchell Leisen
- Written by: Gregorio Martínez Sierra (play)
- Starring: Dorothea Wieck; Evelyn Venable
- Distributed by: Paramount Pictures
- Release date: November 19, 1933
- Running time: 76 minutes
- Country: United States
- Language: English

Cradle Song is a 1933 American pre-Code drama film directed by Mitchell Leisen in his directorial debut, released by Paramount Pictures, and starring Dorothea Wieck and Evelyn Venable.

It is one of several films based on the 1911 Spanish play Canción de cuna by María and Gregorio Martínez Sierra. The play was translated into English in the 1920s by John Garrett Underhill.

Cradle Song was Dorothea Wieck's first American film.

== Cast ==
- Dorothea Wieck as Joanna
- Evelyn Venable as Teresa
- Guy Standing as Doctor
- Louise Dresser as Prioress
- Kent Taylor as Antonio
- Gertrude Michael as Marcella
- Georgia Caine as Vicaress
- Dickie Moore as Alberto
- Nydia Westman as Sagrario
- Marion Ballou as Ines
- Eleanor Wesselhoeft as Mistress of Novices
- Gail Patrick as Maria Lucia
- Howard Lang as Mayor
- Diane Sinclair as Christina
- Gertrude Norman as Tornero No. 1
- Dorothy Vernon as Nun

== Reception ==
The film was a box office disappointment for Paramount.

== See also ==
- Canción de cuna (1941 film)
