= Ronald Radd =

British actor (1929–1976)

- Radd in the Callan episode "That'll Be the Day" (1972)
- Born: 22 January 1929; Ryhope, Sunderland, County Durham, England
- Died: 23 April 1976 (aged 47); Toronto, Canada
- Occupation: Actor
- Years active: 1955–1977

Ronald Radd (22 January 1929 – 23 April 1976) was a British television actor. He originated the role of Hunter in the television thriller series Callan. In 1971, he was nominated for a Tony Award for Abelard and Heloise.

== Early work ==
Radd began as a stage actor in the Alexandra Theatre in Birmingham in the early-1950s, along with the likes of Leslie Sands and Edward Mulhare. In 1951 he appeared in a Lionel Hamilton production of The Romantic Young Lady at the Kettering Savoy. In 1952, he essayed the lead role of Hercule Poirot in Agatha Christie's Black Coffee.

By 1954, Radd had graduated to the West End, where he appeared with Kenneth Williams in two different productions in the Apollo Theatre in February 1956, The Buccaneer and The Boy Friend.

In 1958 he starred in My Fair Lady on Broadway with Reginald Denny.

== Television and film work ==
Radd gradually lost interest in theatre and broke into television in Ordeal by Fire in 1957 as a dastardly Frenchman with Peter Wyngarde and Patrick Troughton whom he appeared with in the BBC production of A Tale of Two Cities (1958).

Radd made a number of appearances in the NBC production The Shari Lewis Show between 1960 and 1963, and in 1960 appeared in the production of Eugene O'Neill's The Iceman Cometh directed by Sidney Lumet, who also directed him in the feature film adaptation of The Sea Gull (1968) and The Offence (1972). In between them he appeared in John Huston's The Kremlin Letter (1970). Radd worked alongside actors such as Robert Redford and Jason Robards. In that year, Radd also appeared in the NBC production of The Tempest playing the role of the drunkard Stefano, alongside Richard Burton who portrayed Caliban and Maurice Evans as Prospero. Radd made a guest appearance on Episode 2 of the TV series The Saint, which starred a young Roger Moore. The episode first aired Sept 26, 1963.

Radd featured in some 60 different TV shows between 1955 and 1976 including Department S, The Avengers, Danger Man, The Prisoner, Special Branch and Z-Cars. He memorably played "Hunter" in the one-off television play in ITV's "Armchair Theatre" strand, called A Magnum For Schneider. To protect his shady Government department ("The Section"), Hunter brings once-top operative and assassin David Callan (Edward Woodward) back to kill Schneider, an international illegal arms dealer. Hunter's plan is for Callan to be caught at the scene and take the blame, thus getting the job done yet clearing The Section of involvement. But Callan gets wise when first police, then colleague Toby Meres turn up at Schneider's apartment. Callan turns the tables by leaving Meres unconscious in his place. This led to the creation of the highly regarded spy series Callan with highly charged, antagonistic exchanges between Callan and Hunter among episode highlights. Radd appeared occasionally in later series of Callan.

In the sixth episode of Randall and Hopkirk (Deceased), "Just for the Record" in 1969, he played the role of the villain Pargiter, a deluded character intent on proving he was heir to the throne of England.

In 1971, Radd's performance in Abelard and Heloise, earned him a nomination for Broadway's Tony Award for Best Featured Actor in a Play.

== Death ==
He died in Toronto, Ontario, Canada of a brain haemorrhage in 1976 aged 47.

== Selected filmography ==
- The Camp on Blood Island (1958) – Commander Yamamitsu
- The Iceman Cometh (1960) – Captain Cecil Lewis
- The Small World of Sammy Lee (1963) – Big Alf
- Up Jumped a Swagman (1965) – Harry King
- Where the Spies Are (1966) – Stanilaus
- Mister Ten Per Cent (1967) – Publicist
- The Double Man (1967) – Russian General
- The Sea Gull (1968) – Shamraev
- Can Heironymus Merkin Ever Forget Mercy Humppe and Find True Happiness? (1969) – Critic Bentley
- The Kremlin Letter (1970) – Captain Potkin
- The Offence (1972) – Lawson
- Divorce His, Divorce Hers (1973) – Angus McIntyre
- Galileo (1975) – Vanni
- The Spiral Staircase (1975) – Oates
- Operation Daybreak (1975) – Aunt Marie's Husband
