= Diane Shalet =

American actress (1935–2006)

- Born: February 23, 1935; New York, New York, U.S.
- Died: February 23, 2006 (aged 71); Palm Springs, California
- Occupation: Actress
- Spouse: Michael Strong (1969 - 1980, his death)

Diane Shalet (February 23, 1935 – February 23, 2006) was an American Broadway and television character actress. She was perhaps best known for her recurring role as Ms. Hawkins in the drama Matlock. She made a guest appearance on The Monkees in the season-two episode, "The Fairy Tale", as the Fairy of the Locket (January 8, 1968).

== Early years ==
A native of New York, Shalet attended the High School of Performing Arts and Queens College. In July and August 1951, she performed in summer stock in upstate New York, appearing in productions of Fay Kanin's Goodbye, My Fancy, starring Sylvia Sidney, and Leonard Bernstein's On the Town, starring Nancy Walker of the original Broadway cast.

== Career ==
In 1953, Shalet made what was later described as her professional debut in the Honolulu Repertory Theatre's production of Dark of the Moon. (Note: Contrary to the later account (as per Shalet's professional résumé, circa 1964, which also places this production in 1956, featuring an allegedly 16-year-old Shalet), the contemporaneous 1953 story cites the then 18-year-old Shalet's "wide experience in professional theater", further stating that "[s]he was a member of the road companies of 'Oklahoma,' 'Brigadoon,' 'Connecticut Yankee' and 'Bloomer Girl' [and] also played in 'Goodbye My Fancy' and the New York production of 'On the Town.') She was 18 years old at the time and had intended to study in a college in Japan. However, when an illness in her family resulted in Shalet moving to Hawaii instead, she decided to seize this opportunity.

By her own account, it was Shalet's selection for the charter company at Lincoln Center Repertory Theater that truly launched her career. She was one of 15 people chosen from 1,500 applicants. During an eight-month training program, she performed in all three of the company's 1963 productions.

Shalet's Broadway credits include Tartuffe (1965), The Changeling (1964), But For Whom Charlie (1964), and After The Fall (1964). She also had roles in the touring companies of Bloomer Girl, Brigadoon, Connecticut Yankee, and Oklahoma.

Films in which Shalet appeared included The Reivers (1969), Deadhead Miles (1972), and The Last Tycoon (1976). She also made over 200 guest appearances on episodic television shows. They include Bonanza, Born Free (TV series), “The Phil Silvers Show”, and Cagney & Lacey.

For 14 years, Shalet taught at UCLA; she also was a founder of the Actors and Writers Lab in Manhattan. A life member of The Actors Studio, she was the author of the 1994 novel Grief in a Sunny Climate, (ISBN 0-312-11054-5) which a review in The New York Times described as a "deceptively silly story to disguise some serious lessons about sorrow and dependency." The book received first prize for fiction writing at the Santa Barbara Writers Conference.

== Personal life and death ==
In 1969, Shalet married actor Michael Strong, with whom she had recently co-starred—alongside Glynn Turman, under Vinnette Carroll's direction—in a revival of William Hanley's Slow Dance on the Killing Ground. Subsequent television collaborations included 1974 episodes of Insight—featuring uncredited appearances by each.—and Harry O, as well as the 1978 television movie The Ascent of Mt. Fuji.

Predeceased by her husband, Shalet died in Palm Springs, California, on February 23, 2006, her 71st birthday.

== Filmography ==
- The Reivers (1969) - Hannah
- Deadhead Miles (1973) - Donna James
- The Last Tycoon (1976) - Stahr's Secretary
- The Incredible Hulk (1981) - Nurse Judy Gray
- The Monkees (1968) – Fairy of the Locket in S2:E16, "Fairy Tale"
