= The Butterfly's Evil Spell =

Play by Federico García Lorca

The Butterfly's Evil Spell (El maleficio de la mariposa) was the first play by the twentieth-century Spanish dramatist Federico García Lorca.

A symbolist work drawing inspiration from Yeats and Maeterlinck, especially the latter's The Blue Bird (1905), Lorca's play deals with an injured butterfly, temporarily stranded amongst other insects, that flies away despite a cockroach's love for her.

Written at the invitation of impresario Gregorio Martínez Sierra, it was first staged at Madrid's Teatro Eslava on 22 March 1920 with ballet dancer Encarnación López Júlvez, called "La Argentinita", as the Butterfly, and Catalina Bárcena as the Cockroach. It was not well received by the public and was cancelled after only four performances. Later García Lorca would claim on various occasions that Mariana Pineda (1927) was his first play.

Several aspects of the style and thematic content of The Butterfly's Evil Spell became distinguishing features of Lorca's mature drama: the exploration of symbolist stylization and non-naturalism, the incorporation of different art forms including music and ballet, bold attention to details of staging, and familiar themes such as frustrated love and the imminence of death.

The work has been made into an opera by Edward Lambert.
