= María de la O =

Maria de la O is a Spanish given name (although De la O exists as a surname). It is typically given to girls born in Advent, such as María de la O Lejárraga. The name references the so-called O Antiphons, vesper prayers that begin with the exclamation “O”, such as O Sapientia (O Wisdom).

Navas del Madroño has a church dedicated to Nuestra Señora de la O (Our Lady of the O).

== Film ==
There is a 1936 film entitled María de la O, inspired by a song of the same name which was composed for Estrellita Castro.
