= Sylvia Syms =

British actress (1934–2023)

Sylvia Syms OBE
- Syms as Sister Diana Murdoch in Ice Cold in Alex, c. 1958
- Born: Sylvia May Laura Syms; 6 January 1934; Woolwich, London, England
- Died: 27 January 2023 (aged 89); Northwood, London, England
- Education: Royal Academy of Dramatic Art
- Occupation: Actress
- Years active: 1955–2019
- Spouse: Alan Edney (m. 1956; div. 1989)
- Children: 2, including Beatie
- Relatives: Nick Webb (nephew); Alex Webb (nephew)

Sylvia May Laura Syms (6 January 1934 – 27 January 2023) was an English stage and screen actress. Her best-known film roles include My Teenage Daughter (1956), Woman in a Dressing Gown (1957), for which she was nominated for a BAFTA Award, Ice Cold in Alex (1958), No Trees in the Street (1959), Victim (1961) and The Tamarind Seed (1974).

Known as the "Grand Dame of British Cinema", Syms was a major player in films from the mid-1950s until mid-1960s, usually in stiff-upper-lip English pictures, as opposed to kitchen sink realism dramas, before becoming more of a supporting actress in both film and television roles. On television, she was known for her recurring role as dressmaker Olive Woodhouse on the BBC soap opera EastEnders. She was also a notable theatre player.

Syms portrayed Queen Elizabeth The Queen Mother in the 2006 biopic The Queen.

== Early life and education ==
Syms was born in Woolwich, London, England, in 1934, the daughter of Daisy (née Hale) and Edwin Syms, a trade unionist and civil servant. With the outbreak of World War II, Syms was evacuated to Kent and subsequently Monmouthshire. She grew up in Well Hall, Eltham.

When Syms was 12, her mother died from a brain tumour. At 16, she suffered a nervous breakdown and contemplated taking her own life until an intervention from her stepmother. Syms was educated at convent schools before deciding to become an actress and attending the Royal Academy of Dramatic Art, graduating in 1954. She later served on RADA's council.

Syms's career began in repertory theatre in Eastbourne and Bath. She made her West End debut in The Apple Cart with Noël Coward.

== Film career ==
In 1955, Syms was given a leading role in a TV play The Romantic Young Lady. This led to two offers, one to make a film for Herbert Wilcox, My Teenage Daughter, another to sign a long-term contract with Associated British. She accepted both. In My Teenage Daughter (1956), Syms played Anna Neagle's troubled daughter. The film was successful at the British box office.

For Associated British she made No Time for Tears then appeared in The Birthday Present. Syms had the third lead in Woman in a Dressing Gown for director J. Lee Thompson which was very popular. She then made the English Civil War film, The Moonraker and the war film Ice Cold in Alex, also directed by Thompson. In early 1958, she made a third film for Thompson, No Trees in the Street. She announced she would make her first screen comedy The Light Blue. This became Bachelor of Hearts. In March 1959, she was voted Variety Club's Film Actress of 1958.

In 1959, Syms appeared in the film Expresso Bongo as Maisie King, opposite Cliff Richard. She played opposite Dirk Bogarde in the 1961 film Victim, as the wife of a barrister who is a closet homosexual. The film is thought to have broadened the debate that led to the decriminalisation of homosexual acts in private in the United Kingdom.

Syms made Ferry to Hong Kong, The World of Suzie Wong and Conspiracy of Hearts. A May 1962 article in Variety called her the top female star in British films "with little competition, as yet".

Syms travelled to Ireland to play opposite Patrick McGoohan as the wife of a condemned man in The Quare Fellow.

She played Tony Hancock's wife in The Punch and Judy Man. The film also featured her nephew, Nick Webb. In 1963, she ended her contract with Associated British which by then guaranteed her £10,000 a year but which she felt was too restrictive. She appeared in East of Sudan (1964). In 1965, she appeared on stage in Dual Marriageway, a comedy by Enid Rudd.

== Later career ==
Other comedies followed, such as The Big Job (1965), but it was for drama that she won acclaim, including The Tamarind Seed (1974) with Julie Andrews and Omar Sharif, for which she was nominated for a British Film Academy award.

In 1970, Syms changed direction playing Beatrice opposite Julian Glover's Benedick in a production of William Shakespeare's Much Ado About Nothing. The Prospect Theatre Company production, directed by Tony Richardson, was first presented at the Edinburgh International Festival and subsequently toured the United Kingdom.

Syms featured in the husband-and-wife TV comedy My Good Woman from 1972 to 1974 and on the weekly BBC programme Movie Quiz as one of two team captains.

In 1975, Syms headed the jury at the 25th Berlin International Film Festival.

In 1989, Syms guest-starred in the Doctor Who story Ghost Light. Shortly after the end of British Prime Minister Margaret Thatcher's term in office in 1990, Syms portrayed her in Thatcher: The Final Days (1991), a Granada television film for ITV, which dramatises the events surrounding Thatcher's removal from power, a role she recreated for the stage. From 2000 to 2003, she played Marion Riley in the ITV comedy-drama At Home with the Braithwaites. She also featured in the serial The Jury (2002) and in the same year contributed Sonnet 142 to the compilation album When Love Speaks.

For Stephen Frears's biopic The Queen (2006), Syms was cast as Queen Elizabeth The Queen Mother. She also appeared in The Poseidon Adventure (2005), an American TV film that was a loose remake of the 1972 feature film. Syms also took up producing and directing.

In 2009, Syms appeared in the film Is Anybody There? alongside Michael Caine and Anne-Marie Duff.

In 2009, she featured in the ITV drama series Collision. In 2010, she guest-starred as a patient in BBC One's drama series Casualty, having played a different character in an episode in 2007. Syms also appeared as another character in Casualty's sister series Holby City in 2003. From 2007 to 2010, she had a recurring role in BBC One's EastEnders, playing dressmaker Olive Woodhouse. In 2010, Syms took part in the BBC's The Young Ones, a series in which six celebrities in their seventies and eighties attempt to overcome some of the problems of ageing by harking back to the 1970s. From 2013 to 2019, Syms was the narrator of Talking Pictures, which aired on BBC Two.

Syms had numerous theatre roles, including in productions of Much Ado About Nothing, Who's Afraid of Virginia Woolf? and Antony and Cleopatra.

== Personal life and death ==
On 9 June 1956, Syms married Alan Edney, whom she had dated since she was a teenager. In 1961, they lost a baby daughter. Later that year, Syms and her husband adopted a boy. In October 1962, she gave birth to another daughter, Beatie Edney who is also an actress. Syms and her husband divorced in 1989 when she discovered he had had a mistress for several years and that they had a two-year-old daughter.

Syms was the aunt of musicians Nick and Alex Webb.

Syms' sister Joan married Norman Webb, the Cambridge-educated statistician who invented the Television Audience Measurement system and was later a chief executive of Gallup.

Syms was a longtime supporter of the Stars Foundation for Cerebral Palsy, serving on its board as an officer for 16 years until 2020, with singer Vera Lynn.

In the last year of her life, Syms lived at Denville Hall, a retirement home for actors in London. She died there on 27 January 2023, aged 89.

== Legacy ==
In the words of Steven Vagg of Filmink magazine:

I don’t think any actress in English speaking cinema of this era had such a variety of love interests as Sylvia Syms. It helped that she was beautiful, of course ... that she could act: it's hard to think of a bad Sylvia Syms performance – sometimes she was miscast, but never bad. She always brought a level of intelligence to her roles along with a sense of fun. And she was highly adept playing "smouldering hot lava of emotion and sensuality under an outwardly straight-laced and sensible facade" that made her – and this is meant with nothing but the greatest respect to the recently departed – sexy as hell.

== Filmography ==
=== Film ===
- 1955 The Driving Seat as Sylvia Bayton
- 1956 My Teenage Daughter as Janet Carr
- 1957 The Birthday Present as Jean Scott
  Woman in a Dressing Gown as Georgie
  No Time for Tears as Nurse Margaret Collier
- 1958 The Moonraker as Anne Wyndham
  Ice Cold in Alex as Sister Diana Murdoch
  Bachelor of Hearts as Ann Wainwright
- 1959 No Trees in the Street as Hetty
  Ferry to Hong Kong as Liz Ferrers
  Expresso Bongo as Maisie King
- 1960 Conspiracy of Hearts as Sister Mitya
  The World of Suzie Wong as Kay O'Neill
- 1961 Amazons of Rome as Clelia
  Flame in the Streets as Kathie Palmer
  Victim as Laura Farr
- 1962 The Quare Fellow as Kathleen
- 1963 The Punch and Judy Man as Delia Pinner
  The World Ten Times Over as Billa
- 1964 East of Sudan as Miss Woodville
- 1965 Operation Crossbow as Flight Officer Constance Babington-Smith
  The Big Job as Myrtle Robbins
- 1966 Bat Out of Hell as Diana Stewart
- 1967 Danger Route as Barbara Canning
- 1968 Hostile Witness as Sheila Larkin
  The Fiction Makers as Amos Klein
- 1969 Run Wild, Run Free as Mrs. Ransome
  The Desperados as Laura
- 1971 Some of My Best Friends Are... as Sadie
- 1972 Asylum as Ruth
- 1974 The Tamarind Seed as Margaret Stephenson
- 1978 Give Us Tomorrow as Wendy Hammond
- 1980 There Goes the Bride as Ursula Westerby
- 1986 Absolute Beginners as Cynthia Eve
- 1988 A Chorus of Disapproval as Rebecca Huntley-Pike
- 1989 Shirley Valentine as Headmistress
- 1992 Shining Through as Linda's Mother
- 1993 Dirty Weekend as Mrs. Crosby
- 1994 Staggered as Margaret
- 1997 The House of Angelo as Mrs. Harvey-Brown
- 1998 Food of Love as Alice Angelo
- 2002 Deep Down as Vera
- 2003 What a Girl Wants as Princess Charlotte
  I'll Sleep When I'm Dead as Mrs. Bartz
- 2004 Mavis and the Mermaid as Gioga
- 2006 The Queen as Queen Elizabeth The Queen Mother
- 2008 Is Anybody There? as Lilian
- 2009 Bunny and the Bull as Hotelier
- 2012 Booked Out as Mrs. Nicholls
  Run for Your Wife as Hospital Patient
- 2018 Together as Rosemary

=== Television ===
- 1955 Life with the Lyons (13 July 1955)
- 1955 The Romantic Young Lady
- 1962 It's a Square World (11 August 1962)
- 1964 The Saint ("The Noble Sportsman") as Lady Anne Yearley
- 1964 The Saint ("Jeannine") as Jeannine Roger
- 1965 Danger Man ("It's Up to the Lady") as Paula Glover
- 1965 The Human Jungle ("Success Machine") as Margo
- 1965 The Baron ("Farewell to Yesterday") as Cathy Dorne
- 1966 Bat Out of Hell as Diana
- 1968 The Saint ("The Fiction Makers") as Amos Klein
- 1968 The Saint (S6, E1, "The Best Laid Schemes") as Arlene
- 1969 Strange Report
- 1971 Paul Temple
- 1972 The Adventurer
- 1972–1974 My Good Woman
- 1982 Nancy Astor as Nanaire Langhorne
- 1982 It's Your Move (TV Short) as The Wife
- 1985 Miss Marple: A Murder is Announced as Mrs Easterbrook
- 1989 Doctor Who (Ghost Light) as Mrs. Pritchard
- 1991 Thatcher: The Final Days as Margaret Thatcher
- 1991 Countdown – guest in Dictionary Corner
- 1993 Mulberry as Springtime
- 1993–1995 Peak Practice as Isabel de Gines
- 1995 The Glass Virgin as Lady Constance
- 1998 Heartbeat ("Where There's a Will") as Peggy Tatton
- 1998 Neville's Island as Mrs. Champness
- 2000–2003 At Home with the Braithwaites as Marion Riley
- 2002 Doctor Zhivago as Madame Fleury
- 2005 The Poseidon Adventure as Belle Rosen
- 2006 Dalziel and Pascoe episode: "The Cave Woman" as Maisie Barron
- 2007, 2009, 2010 EastEnders as Olive Woodhouse
- 2008 New Tricks ("Communal Living") as Beatrice
- 2009 Blue Murder
- 2009 Agatha Christie's Marple ("Murder Is Easy") as Lavinia Enid Pinkerton
- 2010 Doctors
- 2011 Case Histories
- 2011 Rev. as Joan
- 2014 Playhouse Presents as Alice
- 2019 Gentleman Jack as Mrs. Rawson

=== Theatre ===
- 1953 The Apple Cart – with Noël Coward
- 1966 Peter Pan
- 1970 Much Ado About Nothing – Beatrice
- 1984 The Vortex
- 1985 Entertaining Mr Sloane – with Adam Ant
- 1988 Better in My Dreams – director
- 1991 Anthony and Cleopatra
- 1991 The Price – director
- 1992 The House of the Stairs
- 1993 For Services Rendered
