= De la O =

de la O is a surname of Spanish origin, and may refer to:

- Marco de la O (born 1978), Mexican actor
- Rogelio Ramírez de la O (born 1948), economist based in Mexico City
- Valentino de la O, host of the Val De La O Show
- Genovevo de la O (1876–1952), figure in the Mexican Revolution in Morelos

== See also ==
- María de la O is a given name.
