= Lillah McCarthy =

English actress and theatrical manager

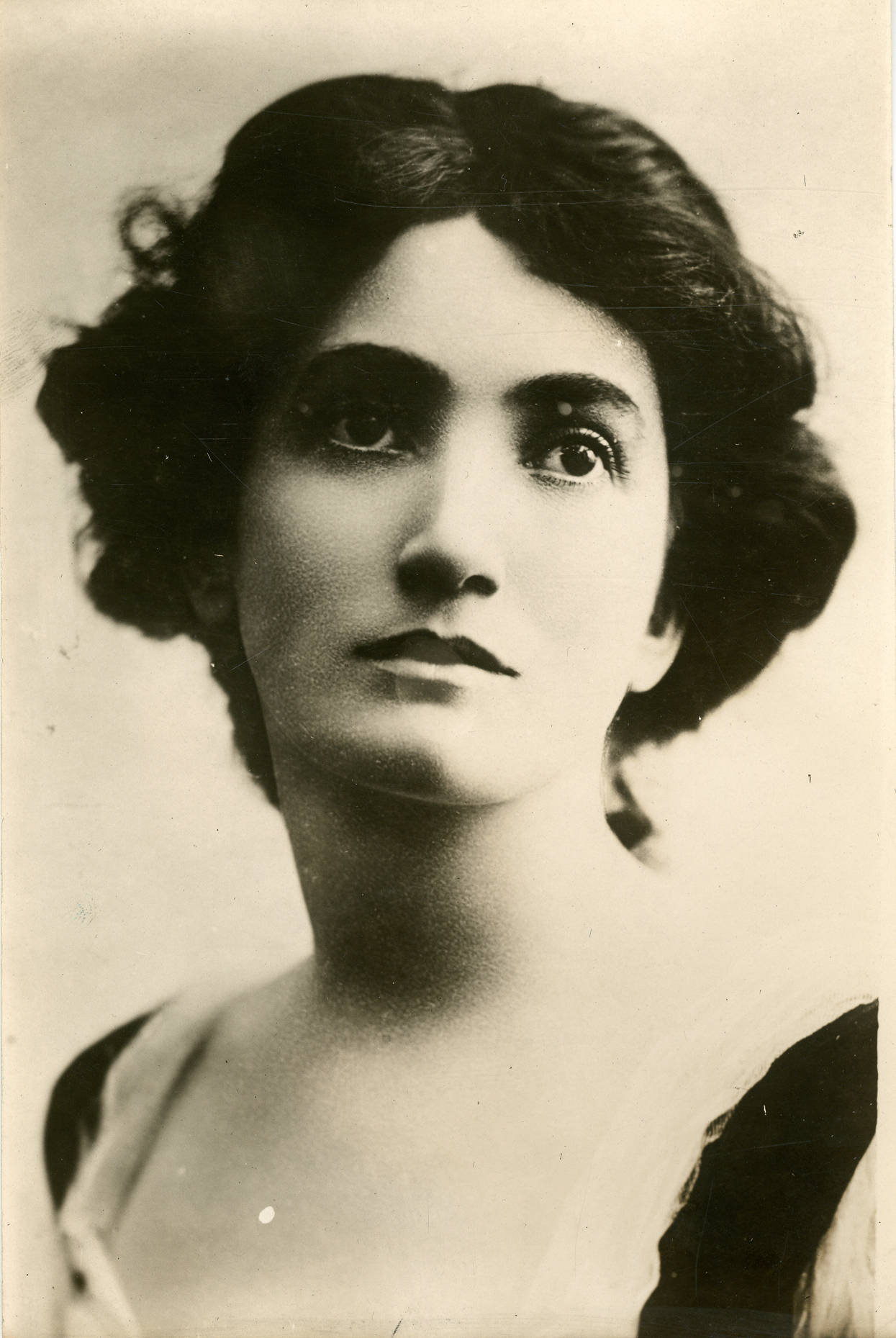
- Lillah McCarthy, age 36
- Born: Lila Emma McCarthy; 22 September 1875; Cheltenham
- Died: 15 April 1960 (aged 84); London
- Occupation: Actress
- Spouse(s): 1. Harley Granville Barker (1906-1918); 2. Frederick Keeble (1920-1952)

Lillah, Lady Keeble OBE (born Lila Emma McCarthy; 22 September 1875 – 15 April 1960) was an English actress and theatrical manager.

== Biography ==
Lila Emma McCarty was born in Cheltenham on 22 September 1875, the seventh of eight children of Jonadab McCarthy and Emma (née Price) who survived infancy (a ninth child born the year before Lila had died aged four months). Jonadab McCarthy (1841–1913) was a furniture and antique dealer, buyer and seller of property, amateur astronomer (FRAS) and lover of poetry. Like several of her siblings, Lila was born at 384 (now 152) High Street, Cheltenham, which doubled as the family home and her father's retail outlet. The building no longer exists, but the current property on the site has a blue plaque to her memory.

After unhappy episodes at school, Lila was taught at home by her father. Her lifelong love of the theatre was triggered in 1891 by seeing Lillie Langtry play the title role in Tom Taylor's Lady Clancarty at Cheltenham's New Theatre and Opera House (now the Everyman).

By 1895, Jonadab had acquired a property in Chepstow Place, Bayswater, enabling Lila to continue her studies in London. She went to Hermann Vezin's School of Acting to learn elocution; in his later years Vezin gave lessons to aspiring actors, including Herbert Beerbohm Tree. McCarthy's first role was as Lady Macbeth in an amateur production in May 1895, though she had in fact given a dramatic recital in this role aged just 15 in 1891.

She was directed by William Poel, the theatre manager and Elizabethan specialist, at the Shakespeare Reading Society at St. George's Hall, Langham Place. George Bernard Shaw was in the audience and noted that "her Lady Macbeth was a highly promising performance, and that some years of hard work would make her a valuable recruit to the London stage". He advised McCarthy "to go into the provinces for ten years and learn how to act". She took him at his word, and a decade elapsed before she approached him again. It was at this time she started to call herself "Lillah".

Later in 1895, she toured with Ben Greet, the Shakespearian actor and impresario, in a wide variety of parts. The following January McCarthy received an offer from Wilson Barrett to join his company for the part of Berenis, in the London production of his play The Sign of the Cross, at the Lyric Theatre. In November 1896 she sailed on the Britannic en route to New York for her first overseas tour which was with Ben Greet's elder brother, William. Her first appearance was at the Knickerbocker Theatre soon after arriving, playing Mercia in the Sign of the Cross.

McCarthy returned to England in March 1897 and went on tour in Britain. She then joined Wilson Barrett once again for his tour to Australia. They left England in October 1897, returning in August 1898. In Melbourne she appeared as Serena in Claudian; as Auntie Nan in The Manxman; as Gertrude in Hamlet; and as Servia in Virginius, alongside her brother Daniel and with Barrett in the lead role in all four. The tour progressed to Sydney for three months, followed by Adelaide in June where McCarthy also played Emilia in Othello, and finally to Perth by July 1898.

The tour next took them to New Zealand and then South Africa – they arrived in Cape Town in June 1902, a few days after the South African War had ended. McCarthy wrote in her memoir that "British soldiers were eager to adore us – any or all of us […] In Capetown a major sat upon my balcony and said, now that he was free from duty, he would take me to settle upon a chicken-farm in Ireland."

Back in England, a new chapter in Lillah's career opened in 1905. In her memoir she recalls

Then one day brother Dan … looks up from the paper he is reading in the sitting-room of our lodgings, and exclaims "Your red-headed man has written a play." "Who?" I said. "Why, that dramatic critic of the Saturday Review who gave you such a wigging." "Not Bernard Shaw?" I asked. "That's the chap," says he. I said no more. It was an omen, for, almost to the day, the ten years were up.

She wrote to Shaw, who asked her to visit him in Adelphi Terrace. "He looked at me, gave me a broad smile, and said 'Why, here's Ann Whitefield'." McCarthy played this role in Man and Superman at the Court Theatre, Sloane Square in May 1905, followed by Nora in Shaw's John Bull's Other Island in September. In 1906, McCarthy appeared again in Man and Superman, this time opposite Harley Granville Barker. They married in the play and then in real life – at the register office, Henrietta Street, Covent Garden on 24 April 1906. The couple, who had known each other for ten years or more, honeymooned in Paris, Germany and the Tyrol.

The period 1907–1913 was a successful one for McCarthy. Her appearances included Shaw's Don Juan in Hell; Alfred Sutro's The Barrier: a revival of Arms and the Man; and, importantly, Euripides' Bacchae. In 1910, while staying with H. G. Wells and his wife in Sandgate, McCarthy received a letter from a friend who had seen and was much taken with a play by the Norwegian Hans Wiers-Jenssen called Anne Pedersdotter. which included "uncanny and revolting things: witchcraft and incest". Shaw had no interest in it, but McCarthy persuaded John Masefield to translate and adapt it. Reluctantly he eventually wrote The Witch, which opened at the Court Theatre in January 1911. It was produced by her husband, with Lillah appearing in the lead role.

Her next appearances were in Shaw's Fanny's First Play at the Kingsway Theatre in 1912 (now under the management of McCarthy and her husband); and in the title role of Gilbert Murray's translation of Iphigenia in Tauris, also at the Kingsway, which "every Suffragette should do her best to see … it is a Suffragette drama, like every play of Euripides … [with] Miss Lillah McCarthy's power at its best". This review must have struck a chord with McCarthy, who had "carried banners for Mrs Pankhurst and the Cause". She next appeared before the King and Queen at Downing Street, in the third act of John Bull's Other Island, and in Barrie's The Twelve Pound Look. The Prime Minister's wife, Margot Asquith, wrote the next day to tell McCarthy how much the King and Queen had enjoyed her performance, "laughing and clapping the whole time".

With the advent of war, McCarthy and her husband sailed to the United States in December 1914. Two accounts suggest that it was Asquith who encouraged them go to America, saying that "We don't want Barker as a soldier" and encouraging McCarthy to make money for her post-war career. They had several successes in the United States, including producing and performing in The Doctor's Dilemma at Wallack's Theatre in New York; Iphigenia in Tauris at the College of the City of New York, Princeton, Yale, Harvard and elsewhere, often in stadia; and Trojan Women at the same universities. But for their marriage it was a disaster – Granville Barker met and fell in love with a wealthy, married American. Inevitably, this led to divorce in 1917–18, and Granville-Barker (now with a hyphen) married Helen Gates (formerly Huntington) at the King's Weigh House Chapel, London on 31 July 1918. Granville-Barker forbade any mention of him or their marriage in McCarthy's memoir.

The divorce must have been a painful experience for McCarthy, but to the theatrical world her life appeared to go on as normal. She played the lead in Shaw's Annajanska, the Wild Grand Duchess, dressed at one point in the uniform of the 1st Panjandrum Hussars and wielding a revolver. She was then in Glasgow, playing a lead role in Israel Zangwill's new farce, Too Much Money at the Theatre Royal. In April 1918 it was staged in London at the Ambassadors, in which "Miss Lillah McCarthy played the heroine with a sweep and breadth few actresses have at their command". This was followed by her appearance in The Dumb Wife, an adaptation by Anatole France of a play by Rabelais.

Two year later McCarthy met Frederick Keeble, FRS at the Stoke Poges golf club, where they were both members. They married on 27 March 1920 at the Presbyterian Church, Bryanston Square, London. The couple honeymooned in Biarritz, where they played golf. Later that year, McCarthy was appointed OBE for her "services in connection with the organisation of matinées and the collection of funds for the Queen Mary Fund in aid of the Star and Garter Hospital". They lived at Boars Hill, near Oxford, in a house known as Hammels (sometimes Hamels) that they had constructed from timbers rescued from an old barn in Hertfordshire. They spent five years working on the garden, and entertaining neighbours and friends. In the course of this they met a wide range of people, including Robert Graves, the archaeologists Campbell Thomson and Sir Arthur Evans, the dramatist Alfred Sutro, Arnold Bennett and Sir Oliver Lodge. Frederick Keeble was knighted by King George V at Buckingham Palace on 8 July 1922.

McCarthy's last appearance on the London stage was in Iphigenia in Tauris at the Theatre Royal, Haymarket in 1932. She died at her home, flat 6, Cranley Mansions, 160 Gloucester Road, London on 15 April 1960.
