= A Cradle Song (W. B. Yeats poem) =

Poem by William Butler Yeats

- by W. B. Yeats
- Written: 1899
- First published in: The Wind Among the Reeds
- Language: English
- Rhyme scheme: ABBA CDDC EFFE
- Publisher: John Lane: The Bodley Head
- Publication date: 1899
- Media type: Hardback
- Lines: 12
- Pages: 128
- OCLC: 3132722

Full text
- The_Wind_Among_the_Reeds/A_Cradle_Song at Wikisource

"A Cradle Song" is a poem by W. B. Yeats. The earlier version by Yeats was set as a war song by Ivor Gurney (1920).
