= María de la O Lejárraga =

Spanish feminist writer, dramatist, translator and politician

María de la O Lejárraga García
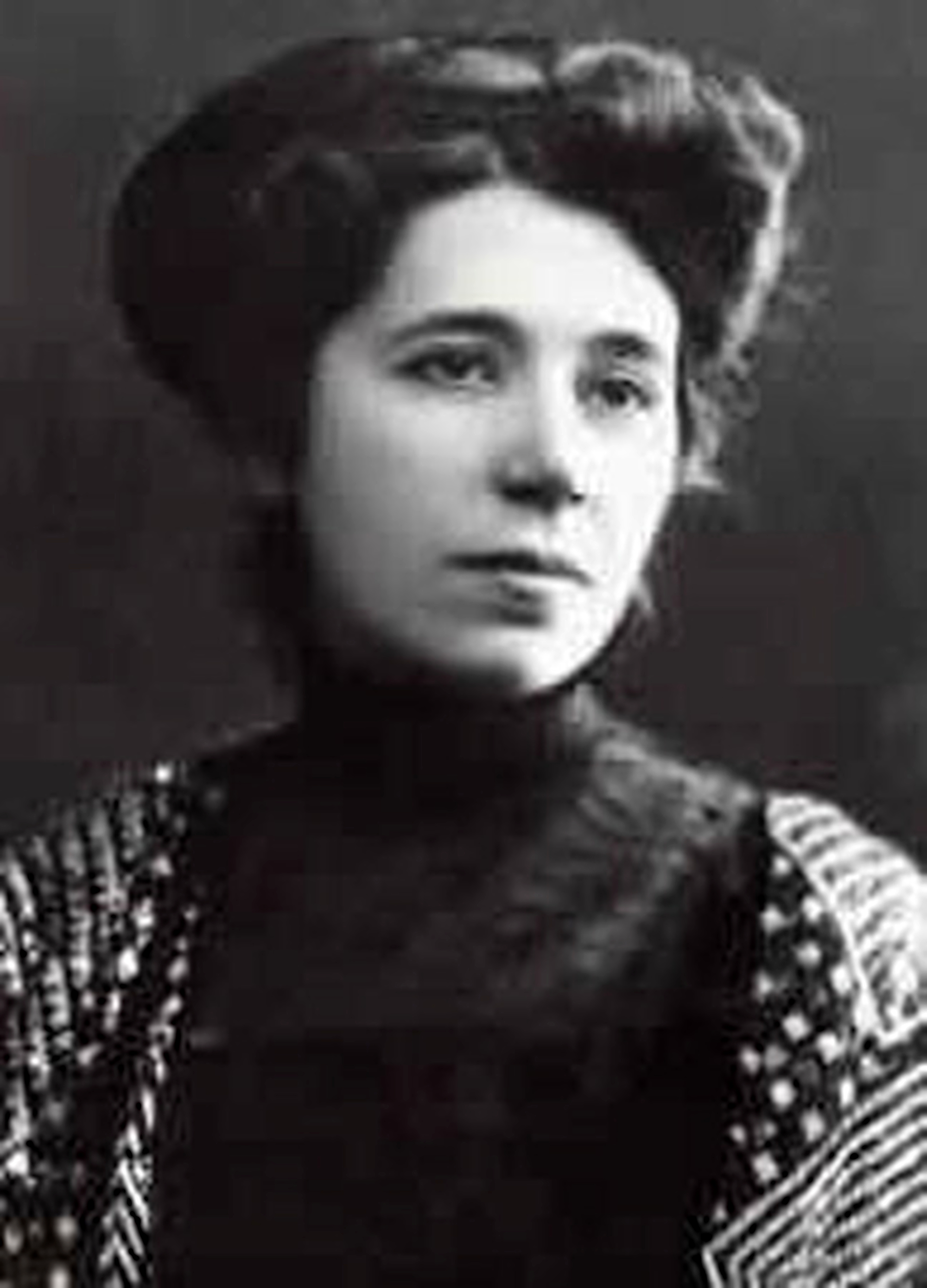
- María Lejárraga
- Born: 28 December 1874; San Millán de la Cogolla, La Rioja, Spain
- Died: 28 June 1974 (aged 99); Buenos Aires, Argentina
- Other name: María Martínez Sierra
- Occupations: writer, dramatist, politician
- Political party: Spanish Socialist Workers' Party
- Spouse: Gregorio Martínez Sierra

María de la O Lejárraga García (28 December 1874 – 28 June 1974) was a Spanish feminist writer, dramatist, translator and politician. She is also known by her married name María Martínez Sierra. Some of her work was published under the name of her husband Gregorio Martínez Sierra.

== Early years ==
María de la O Lejárraga was born into a wealthy family in San Millán de la Cogolla, a village in La Rioja. Lejárraga is a surname of Basque origin, a variant of Lizárraga. The name María de la O in Spanish culture has associations with December, the month of her birth, specifically to the O Antiphons of the Catholic Advent liturgy.

At the age of four, María and her family relocated to the Carabanchel Bajo district of Madrid, because her father, Leandro Lejárraga, was a surgeon and practiced medicine in Madrid. María de la O Lejárraga's mother, Natividad García-Garay personally took care of her children's education and followed French educational programs.

María studied at the Asociación para la Enseñanza de la Mujer where she first came in contact with the pedagogical ideas of the Institución Libre de Enseñanza. She finished her studies in commerce in 1891 and became an English professor at the Escuela de Institutrices y Comercio. María finalized her studies in education at the Escuela Normal in Madrid. As a student, María de la O Lejárraga attended the Congreso pedagogico Hispano-Americano, where she supported the educational postulates of Emilia Pardo Bazán. She worked as a teacher between 1897 and 1907.

In 1905, María de la O Lejárraga traveled to Belgium with a scholarship that allowed her to study the educational systems of that country. During her time in Belgium, she also learned about the Casas del Pueblo and the socialist theses. However, her literary concerns clashed with the society that she grew up in and was closed to the idea that women could dedicate themselves to the arts and sciences.

== Marriage and theatrical success ==
In 1899, María de la O Lejárraga published her first work: Cuentos breves, which was coldly received by her family. In 1900, María married Gregorio Martínez Sierra, with whom she collaborated as a co-author on all the plays that were publicly credited to him alone (she was the main author of the plays, but the plot was usually agreed between both). María de la O Lejárraga, chose to use her husband's name instead of her own. This was prompted because her family did not agree or approve of her publishing pieces of work and because of her career as a teacher. In 1901, María and her husband published Vida Moderna, in which they published both modernist and realist authors alike.

Alongside, Juan Ramón Jiménez, Gregorio and María founded Helios (1903–1904), a magazine dedicated to poetic modernism, where they published, Emilia Pardo Bazán, Antonio Machado, Jacinto Benavente, and the Quintero brothers, among others. In 1907, they also founded the magazine, Renacimiento, of short duration but great quality. These collaborations cemented a (profundo) friendship between Lejárraga and Juan Ramón Jiménez. Both publications were aware of European literary trends. Lejárraga was a polyglot and was the one who made most of the English translations and some French ones that appeared in the Renacimiento.

Lejárraga left her teaching work and took a leave of absence in 1908 to dedicate herself fully to her literature. Her play, Canción de cuna, which premiered in 1911, received the award from the Real Academia Española as the best work of the theatrical session of 1910 to 1911. Of all of the plays staged in Madrid, at least 20 were plays written by María de la O Lejárraga. In addition, the "Compañía cómico-dramática Martínez Sierra", directed by her husband, not only performed in Spain but also made several tours in France, Great Britain, The United States, and Latin America. Both María and Gregorio's names appeared on the performance programs. María was also in charge of her husband's theater, the Teatro Lara, when Gregorio was away.

María de la O Lejárraga also collaborated with established writers, including Eduardo Marquina on his works El pavo real and Carlos Arniches, in La chica del gato, which was later taken to the cinema.

== Musical collaborations ==
María de la O Lejárraga wrote several libretti around 1914. Las golondrinas was a zarzuela with music by José María Usandizaga which successfully premiered in February 1914. She wrote the libretto for Joaquin Turina's opera Margot which was premiered in October 1914, and libretti for Manuel de Falla.

"El amor brujo" credited to Gregorio

Prior to World War I, Turina and Falla were living in Paris, where María and her husband came into contact with Falla in 1913 at the request of Turina. Maria had written a guide to Granada (Granada. Guía emocional), which was first published in Paris in 1911. Falla, who had already composed the opera La vida breve which is set in Granada, was interested in the book. When Falla returned to Spain, they began to collaborate on various projects including El amor brujo which premiered in 1915 in the Teatro Lara. Written for gipsy dancers and singers, El amor brujo combines Andalusian-style music by Falla with a libretto in Andalusian Spanish by María. The premiere was not very successful, despite featuring Pastora Imperio, one of the best-known Flamenco dancers of the time, in the main role. Falla remodelled his score, aiming for a wider public, and he reduced the amount of spoken dialogue. This appears not to have damaged his relationship with his librettist, and Maria went on to collaborate with Falla on another stage work, El sombrero de tres picos, based on the novel of the same name. The first version, which premiered in 1917, was a "pantomime". Sergei Diaghilev and the Ballets Russes premiered their version in 1919.

== Feminism and politics ==
During the 1920s and 1930s Lejárraga was active in many feminist activist groups. She became secretary of the Spanish branch of the International Woman Suffrage Alliance. When the Women's Alliance for Civic Education was formed in 1930, she was the first president. In the 1933 Spanish general election María Lejárraga was elected to Congress as a Socialist Party representative for Granada. In mid-1933 the World Committee Against War and Fascism sent a delegation to Spain to contact women interested in forming a local branch. Dolores Ibárruri, Encarnación Fuyola, Lucía Barón and Irene Falcón formed the National Committee of Women Against War and Fascism. María Lejárraga helped them contact Republican and Socialist women for this cause.

María Lejárraga resigned from Parliament after the harsh government action during the Asturian miners' strike of 1934. At the start of the Spanish Civil War (1936–39) she was sent to Switzerland by the Republican government as the commercial attaché. In 1938 she moved to France, then moved to New York, Los Angeles, Mexico, and finally in 1953 to Buenos Aires, Argentina where she died in poverty in 1974.

== Exile and death ==
After Martínez Sierra's death, Lejárraga published a memoir in 1953 entitled Gregorio y yo (Gregorio and I) in which she revealed proof of her authorship of works that had been attributed to him.

María worked as a translator all her life—from the first translations published anonymously (Librería extranjera de Leonardo Williams, Vida Moderna, Helios) and the translations published under the name María Martínez Sierra for Garnier Publishing House in the early 1900s, to the many theatrical translations published under her husband's name from 1915 to 1930, and the translations of prose and plays published during her exile in Argentina (1950–1974) that helped her earn her living until her death. As she said in a letter to María Lacrampe in 1962: "Translating, for a writer familiar with the business, is an exquisite form of laziness." (Traducir, para un escritor que sabe su oficio, es una forma exquisita de pereza.)

=== Works in English translation ===
María had a number of English translators. Perhaps the most prominent were Harley and Helen Granville-Barker. At the time of their marriage in 1918 Helen already knew Spanish while Harley, an experienced theatre director, brought knowledge of theatre to the translation project. The first play the Granville-Barkers translated was The Romantic Young Lady (Spanish: Sueño de una noche de agosto). Harley directed a production of it in London in September 1920. It was published by E.P. Dutton in 1923 in a two-volume set. (The first volume consisted of translations by John Garrett Underhill published in 1922).

==== Possible plagiarism by Walt Disney ====
Through her translator Collice Portnoff, in 1951 Lejárraga sent Walt Disney a manuscript entitled Merlín y Viviana, the story of a dog falling in love with a vain female cat. She hoped it could be made into a film, but two months later Disney sent it back. In 1955 the Disney movie Lady and the Tramp premiered, in which there were some similarities to Lejárraga's story. In a letter the translator talks about it: "We sent it to Walt Disney, who held it for a couple of months and gave it back saying they didn't take unsolicited manuscripts. Later, they made a movie, Lady and the Tramp, which was the same story, only changing the cat for a female dog. This time I didn't want to protest. What for?"

=== Works in Irish translation ===
Despite having been one of the oldest vernacular literatures in Western Europe, Irish lacked dramatic works. The Irish Literary Revival resulted in efforts to fill the gap including support for translations into Irish. Martínez Sierra plays (which had been performed in Ireland in English before the first Gaelic translation) appear to have been thought suitable for Roman Catholic, rural audiences.

The first Martínez Sierra work in Gaelic was Bean An Ghaiscidhigh (Spanish: La mujer del héroe). which was produced at the Irish Language Theatre in Galway in 1929. The translation, by Tomás Ó hÉighneacháin, was published by An Gúm. Like the Irish Language Theatre, An Gúm was founded under the Cumann na nGaedheal government, part of its policy of reviving the Irish language. It is not evident that either of the Martínez Sierras derived any financial benefit from Irish language adaptations.

== Selected works ==
- Cuentos breves (1899)
- La mujer ante la República (1931)
- Una mujer por caminos de España (1952)
- Gregorio y yo (1953)
- Viajes de una gota de agua (1954)
- Fiesta en el Olimpo (1960)

== Filmography ==
- Bewitched Love, directed by Francisco Rovira Beleta (Spain, 1967, based on the ballet El amor brujo)
- El amor brujo, directed by Carlos Saura (Spain, 1986, based on the ballet El amor brujo)

== Legacy ==
In 2023 a film by Laura Hojman about Maria was nominated for the Goya Award for Best Documentary.

== See also ==
- Carmen de Burgos
- Clara Campoamor
- Women's suffrage
