= The Romantic Young Lady =

The Romantic Young Lady is an English language play, a comedy of manners adapted from a Spanish original, Sueño de una Noche de Agosto ("Dream of an August Night"), attributed to Gregorio Martínez Sierra. The Spanish original was first performed in Madrid in 1918 with Catalina Bárcena as the 23-year-old heroine Rosario.

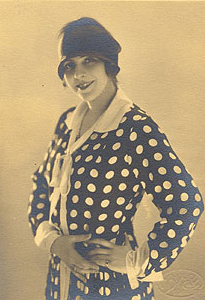
Catalina Bárcena in the 1920s

The translation was first performed in 1920 and remained popular into the 1950s. As well as Rosario, the play features a sophisticated hero, and a thrice-married grandmother. The action takes place between one August evening and the next.

== Authorship and translation ==
The play is traditionally attributed to Gregorio Martínez Sierra. However, he generally wrote in partnership with his wife María de la O Lejárraga and she is assumed to have been the author of at least part of the play. A 1926 edition of the Spanish text does not overtly dispute Gregorio´s authorship, but has a preface by May Gardner which looks at how Maria´s feminism may have influenced the writing. Gardner refers to Spanish courtship rituals (such as meetings at the reja, described for example by Gerald Brenan in South from Granada) and points out that while the play is light comedy, it does examine the place of women in Spanish society.

It was translated by another husband and wife partnership, Harley and Helen Granville-Barker. Helen knew Spanish, whereas Harley, a major figure in British theatre, is assumed not to have known much Spanish at this stage. Harley appears to have been an advocate of working collaboratively in the theatre. His Prefaces to Shakespeare emphasize Shakespeare’s embeddedness in the theatrical world rather than the idea of him as a solitary genius.

== Production ==
The 1920s saw Harley Granville Barker become less involved in putting on plays, but in 1920 he directed The Romantic Young Lady at London´s Royalty Theatre. The cast included:

- Joyce Carey, Rosario
- Dennis Eadie, the Apparition. As well as being involved in the management of the Royalty Theatre, Eadie was cast in some of Harley's original plays.

== Publication ==
The Granville-Barkers went on to translate other Martínez Sierra plays. The Romantic Young Lady was published by E. P. Dutton in 1923 in a volume with three other Martinez Sierra plays. (This was the second of a two-volume set with the first volume consisting of four translations by John Garrett Underhill).

The play appeared as a separate volume, The Romantic Young Lady: A Comedy In Three Acts published by French, a theatrical publisher.

== Adptations ==
The BBC made two film adaptations (1938 and 1955), the second of which seems to have had more impact.

== Other translations ==
The Irish language version of the play Taidhreamh Oidhche Lughnasa uses a more direct translation of the Spanish title, but it may have been influenced by the Granville-Barker translation. It was translated by Pádraig Ó Catháin and performed by the theatre company An Comhar Drámaíochta at the Gate Theatre, Dublin in 1931.
