= Quintero brothers =

Spanish dramatists

Serafín Álvarez Quintero (March 26, 1871 – April 12, 1938) and Joaquín Álvarez Quintero (January 20, 1873 – June 14, 1944) were Spanish dramatists.

== Biography ==
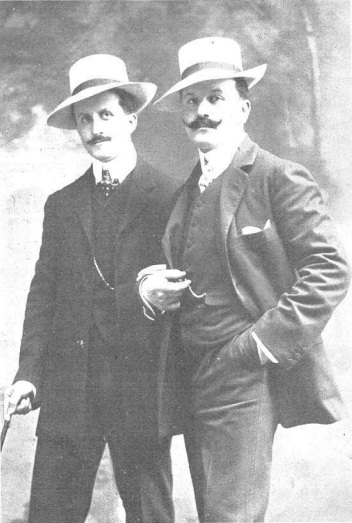
Quintero brothers, photograph by Kaulak

Born in Utrera, Seville Province in 1871 and 1873, they settled in Seville and worked as treasury employees, while collaborating on various publications such as El Diablo Cojuelo, they gradually began their dedication to the theater. Their debut as authors took place in 1888 with Esgrima y amor at the Cervantes Theater in Seville. Their first stage piece, Gilito, was written in 1889. Other works include Blancas y negras (1892), La media naranja (1894), La buena sombra (1895), La reja (1897), El traje de luces and El buena sombra (1898), El patio (1900), El traje de luces and La patria chica (1907), El patinillo (1909), Becquerina and Diana cazadora (1915). Both brothers were members of the Royal Spanish Academy.

Their first resounding success was in 1897 with El ojito right, this success was followed by many others, consisting of Las flores (1901), El genio alegría (1906), Malvaloca (1912), Puebla de las mujeres (1912), Las de Caín (1908), and much later, Mariquilla Terremoto (1930). They were named the favorite brothers of Utrera and Seville. They performed in the most remote areas of the spanish speaking world, such as in the Teatro Colón in Buenos Aires, by the Guerrero-Mendoza company that carried several of their works when the theater was built, due to this the brothers enjoyed innumerable tributes, making their works well-known into the 1920s.

Both were imprisoned at the beginning of the Civil War in El Escorial. Serafín would die of natural causes in 1938, and Melchor Rodríguez García had to intercede to allow Serafin's sister to bring a crucifix to his coffin, as had Serafín wished, but had been given refusal by militiamen at the mortuary house. Joaquín would die in 1944, and the remains of both rest in the San Justo Cemetery in Madrid.

They were also famous for having tried to transcribe Andalusian dialects to written form.

== Work ==
Although they did not only write comedies (such as Fortunato, Nena Teruel, Mundo mundillo..., Los leales, Dios dirá, La calumniada, Don Juan, buena persona, Tambor y cascabel, La boda de Quinita Flores, Pasionera, Concha la Limpia, Los mosquitos, Las de Abel, Diana la cazadora, Sábado sin sol, La flor de la vida, Así se escribe la Historia, Amores y amoríos, El centenario, Doña Clarines, Febrerillo, el loco, La casa de García, La rima eterna, Cabrita que tira al monte, Los duendes de Sevilla, Ventolera, etc...), skits (such as Mañana de sol, 1905), zarzuela operas (such as La Reina Mora, 1903) and comic pieces, but also dramas (such as Malvaloca, 1912, Cancionera, 1924), it was in these genres that they are best remembered because of their comic talent. In total they wrote nearly two hundred titles, some of them awarded, such as Los Galeotes, which received the Royal Academy Award for Best Comedy of the Year. Their last joint work was La Giralda, a zarzuela by José Padilla.

Many of their pieces are of a costumbrismo nature, describing what it's like being from their native Andalusian lands, but leaving aside the gloomy and miserable vision of social ills. According to Francisco Ruiz Ramón in Historia del Teatro Español Siglo XX (Cátedra, 1995), "the basic assumptions of this theater are those of a naive naturalistic realism". In the thirties their art was used in the cinema, creating several scripts for the films of the mythical Estrellita Castro. They did not contribute any substantial technical or structural novelty, but they refined Andalusianism in the same way that Carlos Arniches did. In Madrid, However, they never went further in-depth with their social ideas, which stops at tenderness and melodramatics. In short, they are bourgeois comedies that offer an idealized and friendly vision of Andalusia that does not worry the average viewer; the joy of living silences any hint of dramatic conflict. It was this joie de vivre that saved the theater of the Quintero brothers from critics such as Ramón Pérez de Ayala, José Martínez Ruiz and Luis Cernuda.

Their Complete Works were published in Madrid: Fernando Fe y Espasa-Calpe, 1918-1947, in forty-two volumes.

== International reception ==
The plays had some success in translation. In 1928 Peggy Ashcroft appeared in a London production of the comedy El Centenario. The production was at the Lyric Theatre (Hammersmith) and used the English version by Harley and Helen Granville-Barker.

Tomás Ó hÉighneacháin translated the same play into Irish in 1933. Céad bliain d'aois, to give the play its Irish title, was performed at the Gate Theatre, Dublin, the following year. The production was by An Comhar Drámaíochta (the Gaelic Dramatic Society), a theatre company which received a state subsidy to provide theatre in Irish.

== Bibliography ==
- Javier Huerta, Emilio Peral, Héctor Urzaiz, Teatro español de la A a la Z. Madrid: Espasa-Calpe, 2005.
