= Harley Granville-Barker =

British actor and playwright (1877–1946)

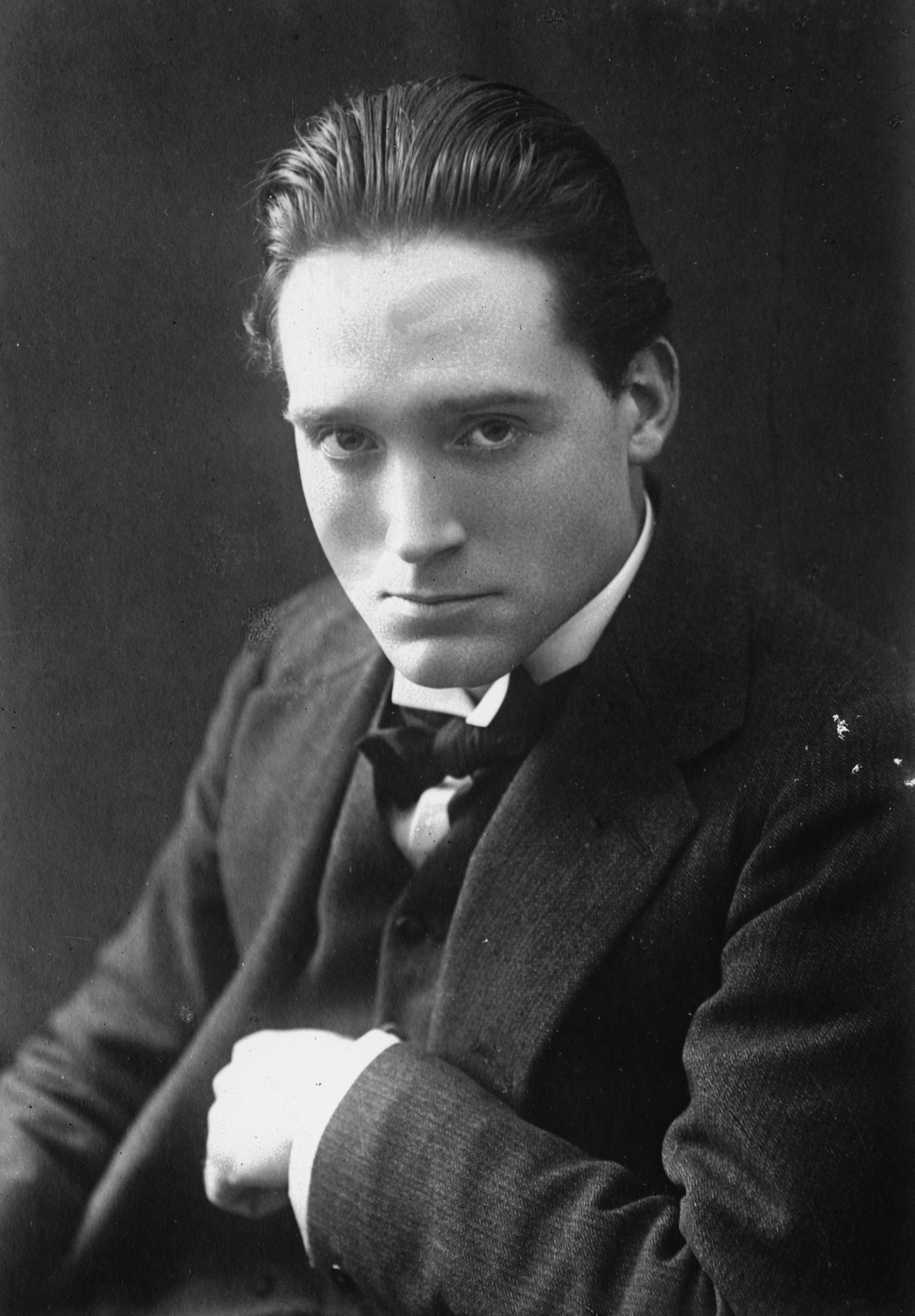
- Born: Harley Granville-Barker; 25 November 1877; London, England, UK
- Died: 31 August 1946 (aged 68); Paris, French Fourth Republic
- Occupations: Actor; director; playwright; manager; critic; theorist
- Spouse(s): Lillah McCarthy; Helen Huntington
- Writing career
- Language: English
- Period: Edwardian era
- Genre: Drama
- Notable works: The Voysey Inheritance, Waste, The Madras House
- Notable awards: Shakespeare Lecture (1925)

Harley Granville-Barker (25 November 1877 – 31 August 1946) was an English actor, director, playwright, manager, critic, and theorist. After early success as an actor in the plays of George Bernard Shaw, he increasingly turned to directing and was a major figure in British theatre in the Edwardian and inter-war periods. As a writer his plays, which tackled difficult and controversial subject matter, met with a mixed reception during his lifetime but have continued to receive attention.

== Biography ==
=== Early life and acting career ===
Harley Granville-Barker was born in London, England on 25 November 1877. He left school at 14 and began a career in acting. As his career blossomed, he seemed to excel in roles that were a culmination of intelligence and romantic dreaminess. This landed him many roles such as; Tanner in Man and Superman, Cusins in Major Barbara, Marchbanks in Candida, and Dubedat in The Doctor's Dilemma. To be more specific the Dubedat and Cusins characters were written by George Bernard Shaw with Granville-Barker specifically in mind. However, performing no longer appealed to Granville-Barker so he gave it up in 1911.

=== Directing career ===
With an interest in theatre still at heart, he decided to focus on directing. During this time directing was not a focus point in English theatre, but he used the building blocks of Antoine and Reinhardt to his advantage and contributed to changing the dynamics of production in English theatre. Some of his first assignments were with the Stage Society, but it wasn't until 1904 when he worked with the Royal Court Theatre that his directing career took off. From 1904 to 1907 he was considered to be one of the major reformers of the Edwardian Stage. While working with the Royal Court, he collaborated with J.E. Vedrenne to mount almost 1,000 performances. Many of these performances were classics while some were new works. Among the new pieces of work were eleven plays written by George Bernard Shaw. Granville-Barker often worked with Shaw to assist in staging his plays and directing them as well.

As the Vedrenne-Barker seasons closed with the Royal Court, new opportunities opened with the Duke of York's Theatre in 1910. This new opportunity reminded Granville-Barker of the need for more repertory companies. In 1904 he collaborated with William Archer to write a book that argued for a national theatre; unfortunately, it was a lost cause that became one of the biggest disappointments in his life. However, his efforts did not go to waste but added to the growth of the regional repertory movement in Britain.

Granville-Barker's directing career boomed with three famous productions of Shakespeare at the Savoy Theatre: The Winter's Tale and Twelfth Night during 1912 and A Midsummer Night's Dream in 1914. Granville-Barker took these productions and removed all classic scenery and replaced it with symbolic scenery, as well as enforcing ensemble acting.

=== Writing career ===
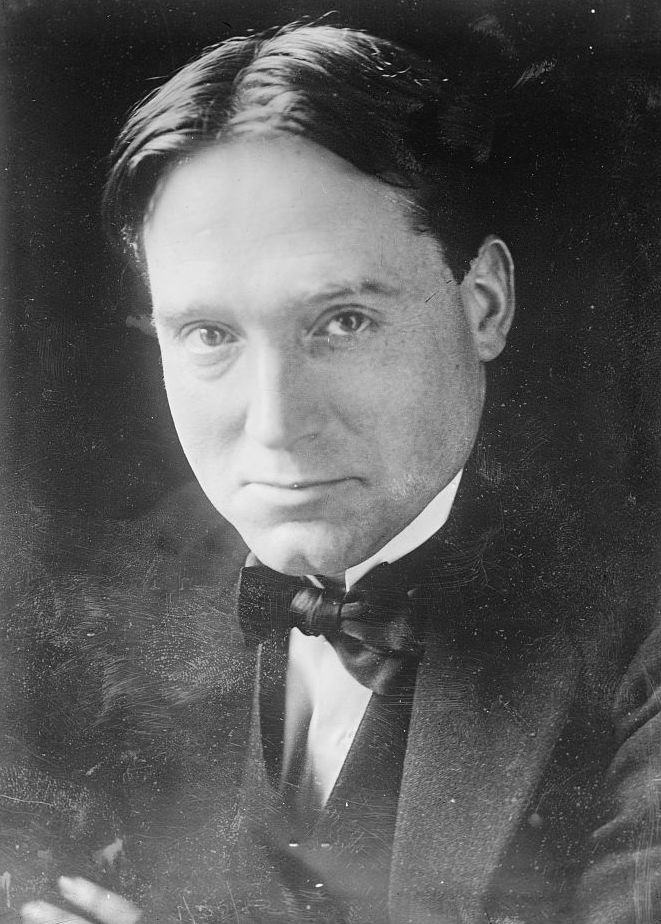
Harley Granville-Barker circa 1915

The year before he met his first wife, Granville-Barker wrote The Voysey Inheritance which is considered to be a masterpiece of the Edwardian stage. His other plays, however, did not sit well with the Edwardian audience. They found his plays to be incomprehensible.

According to The Oxford Companion to Theatre and Performance, his style was more similar to the style of Chekhov in that it put the "action under the surface." Although his audience may not have understood him, this did not stop Granville-Barker from discussing important issues in society. In 1907 Granville-Barker's play Waste was banned due to the topic of abortion and its politics. In 1909, three volumes of his plays, The Voysey Inheritance, Waste, and The Marrying of Ann Leete, were published in a limited edition of 50 copies printed on handmade paper in a slipcase.

Granville-Barker's most notable prose work is the Prefaces to Shakespeare written from 1927 to the end of his life in 1946. Prefaces to Shakespeare was considered the first major Shakespeare study to attend to the practical matters of staging. The prefaces were published in two hardback volumes in 1946 and 1947.

=== Personal life ===
Granville-Barker met his first wife Lillah McCarthy on tour with Ben Greet's Shakespeare and Old English Touring Company in 1895 when he was 17. In Ben Greet's company, he played Paris to McCarthy's Juliet. McCarthy first appeared at The Court Theatre under Barker's co-management in "John Bull's Other Island" in 1905. Shortly thereafter, Barker played opposite McCarthy in Man and Superman (1905). They married on April 24, 1906 at the West Strand Registry Office. McCarthy was to have a leading part in Barker's personal and professional life until their split after World War I. He divorced McCarthy and married an American writer named Helen Gates who had been married to Archer Huntingdon. She supposedly disliked the stage, actors, and especially Shaw. He then hyphenated his name, causing his colleagues to believe that he was abandoning the battle for a life of luxury. Recently, the negative characterization of Helen "as a theatre-hating woman who ruined Barker's career" has been disputed, and her dislike of the theater refuted, on the basis of Granville-Barker's early correspondence with her. "In fact she was a regular theatre-goer, a writer and Barker's eventual collaborator."

He later settled in Paris where he collaborated with Helen on translating the comedies of Martínez Sierra and the Álvarez Quintero brothers. On the outbreak of the Second World War, Granville-Barker fled France for Spain before moving to the United States. In America he lectured at Harvard and was also employed by British Information Services. At the end of the war he returned to France and died in Paris on 31 August 1946. Sympathetic to left-wing causes, he had declined a knighthood.

== Bibliography ==
- Plays by Harley Granville Barker (The Marrying of Ann Leete, The Voysey Inheritance, The Kyle and Waste), ed. Dennis Kennedy, Cambridge University Press (1987) ISBN 0-521-31407-0
- Prefaces to Shakespeare by Harley Granville Barker, in 12 paperback volumes by Nick Hern Books, originally published by Batsford; published in two hardback volumes in 1946 and 1947
- Granville Barker and the Dream of Theatre by Dennis Kennedy, Cambridge University Press (1985)
- The Court Theatre A Commentary and Criticism 1904–1907 by Desmond MacCarthy, Bullen (1907), University of Miami Press (1966)
- Cambridge Guide to Theatre, 1992 ISBN 0-521-43437-8
- Granville‐Barker, Harley (1877–1946). (2012). The Concise Oxford Companion to English Literature
- Harley Granville Barker Reclaimed (featuring the plays The Madras House, The Voysey Inheritance, and Farewell to the Theater) Granville Press and Mint Theater Company (2007) ISBN 978-0971826229
- Granville Barker, Harley. (2010). The Oxford Companion to Theatre and Performance
- Granville Barker: A Secret Life by Eric Salmon, Heinemann Educational Books (1983)
