= Gregorio Martínez Sierra =

Spanish writer and theatre director (1881–1947)

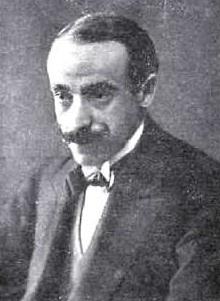
- Martínez Sierra around 1910
- Born: 6 May 1881; Madrid, Spain
- Died: 1 October 1947 (aged 66); Madrid, Spain
- Occupations: Writer, poet, dramatist, theatre director
- Spouse: María Martínez Sierra
- Writing career
- Period: Modernism

Gregorio Martínez Sierra (6 May 1881 – 1 October 1947) was a Spanish writer, poet, dramatist, and theatre director, a key figure in the revival of the Spanish theatrical avant-garde in the early twentieth century.

== Biography ==
Firstborn son of Eduardo Martínez Cuesta and Emilia Sierra Muñoz, he had 5 sisters and 2 brothers. In 1900, he married the writer María de la O Lejárraga. The deft handling of female characters in Martínez Sierra's works has been attributed to the collaboration of his wife. Since the publication of her memoir Gregorio y yo ('Gregorio and I', 1953), her authorship of many of his plays has been increasingly recognised by scholars.

== Work as a poet and playwright ==
Martínez Sierra's literary career began at the age of 17 with the publication of El poema del trabajo ('The Poem of Work', 1898), a volume of poetry in the modernist style. His subsequent books of poetry included Diálogos fantásticos ('Fantastic Dialogues', 1899), Flores de escarcha ('Frost Flowers', 1900) and La casa de primavera ('The House of Spring', 1907).

As a playwright, Martínez Sierra was one of the few progressive dramatists whose productions achieved any measure of commercial success at the time of their composition. His major works include La sombra del padre ('Shadow of the Father', 1909), Primavera en otoño ('Spring in Autumn', 1911), Sólo para mujeres ('For Women Only', 1913), Mamá ('Mama', 1913) and El reino de Dios ('The Kingdom of God', 1916). Canción de cuna ('Cradle Song', 1911), which has been called his "masterpiece", was popular across the Spanish-speaking world, and an English-language adaptation transferred to Broadway in 1927. Several of Martínez Sierra's plays were adapted into films, including Canción de cuna (as Cradle Song, dir. Mitchell Leisen, 1933).

== Work as a publisher and director ==
Martínez Sierra's influence was largely as a publisher and director. Through his publishing house, Renacimiento ('Rebirth'), he translated the work of William Shakespeare, Maurice Maeterlinck and Santiago Rusiñol, and introduced the work of European playwrights including George Bernard Shaw and Luigi Pirandello to Spain. The authorship of the translations published under Gregorio's name belongs undoubtedly to his wife, María Lejárraga, who was fluent in several languages (French, English, Italian, Catalan, Portuguese) and she had published translations under her own name before, after and during her attachment to him.

In 1917 he was appointed Director of Madrid's Teatro Eslava and remained there until 1925, transforming the venue into Spain's first Art Theatre. Amongst a series of Spanish and foreign playwrights whose work he produced "in a new, forward-looking style", it was at Martínez Sierra's invitation that Federico García Lorca created and staged, at the Eslava, his first play, El maleficio de la mariposa ('The Curse of the Butterfly'), in 1920.

== Filmography ==
- Mamá, directed by Benito Perojo (1931, based on the play Mamá)
- Primavera en otoño, directed by Eugene Forde (1933, based on the play Primavera en otoño)
- Una viuda romántica, directed by Louis King (1933, based on the play Sueño de Una Noche de Agosto)
- Cradle Song, directed by Mitchell Leisen (1933, based on the play Canción de cuna)
- Yo, tú y ella, directed by John Reinhardt (1933, based on the play Mujer)
- Julieta compra un hijo, directed by Louis King and Gregorio Martínez Sierra (1935, based on the play Julieta compra un hijo)
- Susana tiene un secreto, directed by Benito Perojo (1935, based on the play Susana tiene un secreto)
- Canción de cuna, directed by Gregorio Martínez Sierra (Argentina, 1941, based on the play Canción de cuna)
- Tú eres la paz, directed by Gregorio Martínez Sierra (Argentina, 1942, based on the novel Tú eres la paz)
- Los hombres las prefieren viudas, directed by Gregorio Martínez Sierra (Argentina, 1943, based on the play Los hombres las prefieren viudas)
- El amor brujo, directed by Antonio Román (Spain, 1949, based on the ballet El amor brujo)
- Canción de cuna, directed by Fernando de Fuentes (Mexico, 1953, based on the play Canción de cuna)
- Honeymoon, directed by Michael Powell (UK/Spain, 1959, based on the ballet El amor brujo)
- Canción de cuna, directed by José María Elorrieta (Spain, 1961, based on the play Canción de cuna)
- Cradle Song, directed by José Luis Garci (Spain, 1994, based on the play Canción de cuna)

=== Screenwriter ===
- La ciudad de cartón (dir. Louis King, 1934)
- Dama de compañía (dir. Alberto de Zavalía, 1940)
- La novia de la Marina (dir. Benito Perojo, 1948)

=== Director ===
- The Trial of Mary Dugan (1931, co-director: Marcel De Sano)
- Julieta compra un hijo (1935, co-director: Louis King)
- Canción de cuna (1941)
- Tú eres la paz (1942)
- Los hombres las prefieren viudas (1943)
