= 1914 in music =

This is a list of notable events in music that took place in the year 1914.

== Specific locations ==
- 1914 in British music
- 1914 in Norwegian music

== Specific genres ==
- 1914 in jazz

== Events ==
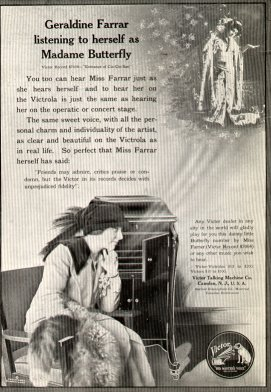
Geraldine Farrar in a 1914 Victrola advertisement

- January 1 – The copyright on Wagner's Parsifal expires allowing it to be staged outside of Bayreuth. Performances take place in Barcelona, Prague, Berlin, Budapest, Bologna, Rome and Wrocław. In the next few weeks it is staged in St. Petersburg, Paris, Brussels, Vienna and London's Covent Garden.
- January 21 – Edward Elgar makes the first recordings of his music, including the miniature "Carissima" prior to its public premiere.
- January 24 – First public performance of Leoš Janáček's piano cycle In the Mists at the third concert of the Organ School in Brno by pianist Marie Dvořáková, teacher of the school.
- January – First Finnish performance of Jean Sibelius's tone poem Luonnotar, with soprano Aino Ackté and conductor Georg Schnéevoigt.
- c. June – First publication of Orchestration, the classic book by Cecil Forsyth.
- August 26 – Rutland Boughton's fairy opera The Immortal Hour is first performed in the Glastonbury Assembly Rooms at the inaugural Glastonbury Festival co-founded by the English socialist composer. On August 5, the first concert concluded with the choral song "The Last Post" by Charles Villiers Stanford in lieu of the Grail Dance from Parsifal "owing to the outbreak of war."
- October – Adelina Patti gives her last public performance, in a Red Cross concert at London's Royal Albert Hall.
- October 15 – In Rovigo, Beniamino Gigli makes his operatic debut in Amilcare Ponchielli's La Gioconda.
- December 6 – Première of Kōsaku Yamada's Symphony in F major and Flower of Mandala at the Imperial Theatre in Tokyo, performed by the Tokyo Philharmonic Society conducted by the composer.
- December 31 – English composer Ralph Vaughan Williams, aged 42, volunteers for war service, initially as a private with the Royal Army Medical Corps.
- The first recording of calypso music is made in Trinidad and Tobago.

== Published popular music ==
- "The Aba Daba Honeymoon" w.m. Arthur Fields & Walter Donovan. Performed in the 1951 film Two Weeks with Love by Debbie Reynolds and Carleton Carpenter
- "After The Roses Have Faded Away" w. Bessie Buchanan m. Ernest R. Ball
- "Along Came Ruth" w.m. Irving Berlin
- "Always Treat Her Like A Baby" w.m. Irving Berlin
- "Back To The Carolina You Love" w. Grant Clarke m. Jean Schwartz
- "Burlington Bertie From Bow" w.m. William Hargreaves
- "By Heck" w. L. Wolfe Gilbert m. S. R. Henry
- "By the Beautiful Sea" w. Harold Atteridge m. Harry Carroll
- "By the Waters of Minnetonka" w. J. M. Cavanass m. Thurlow Lieurance

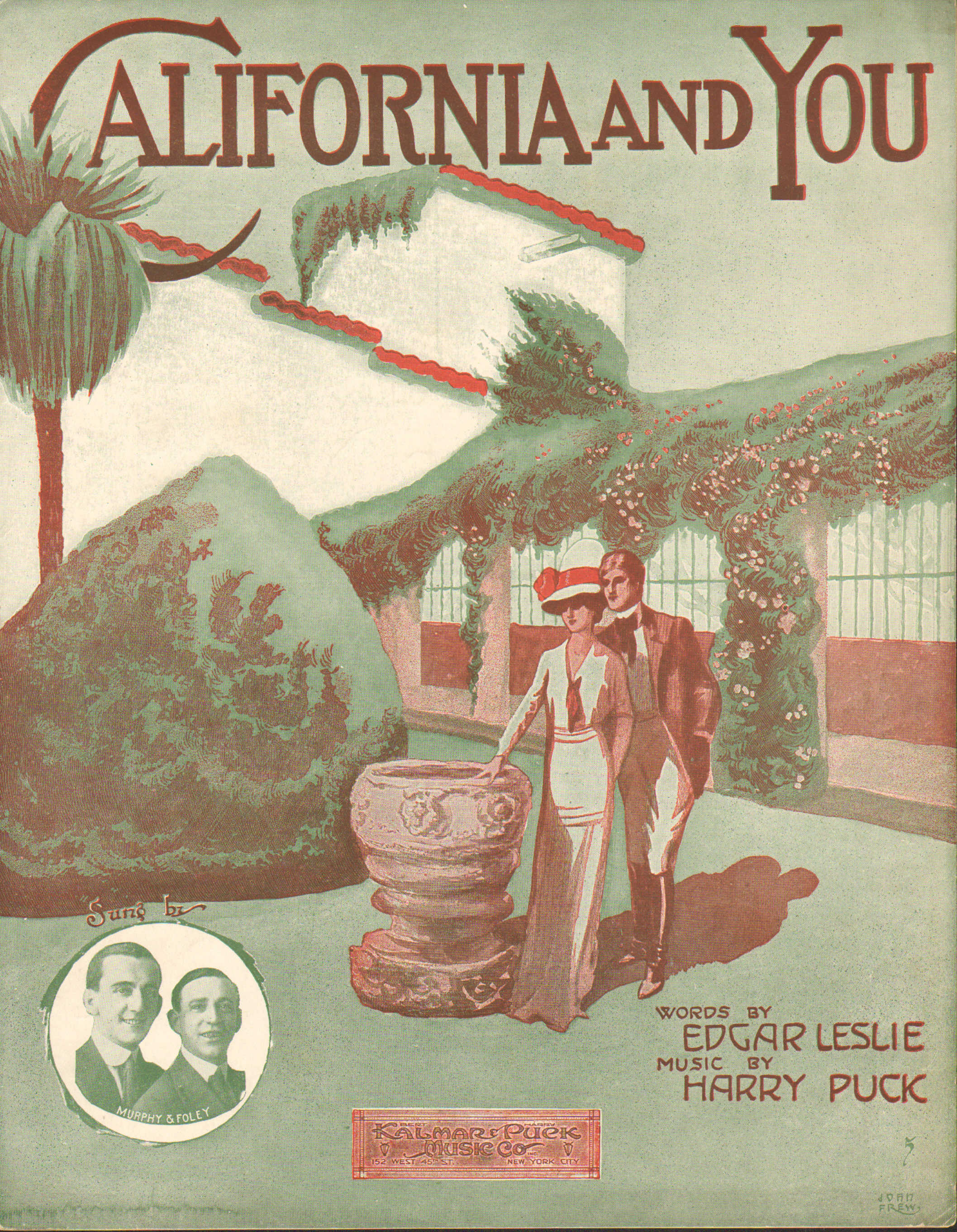

- "California And You" w. Edgar Leslie m. Harry Puck
- "Colonel Bogey – March" m. Kenneth J. Alford
- "La Cucaracha" w. (Eng) Stanley Adams m. arr. Juan Y. D'Lorah
- "The Darktown Poker Club" w. Jean C. Havez m. Bert Williams & Will H. Vodery
- "The Day Is Done" w. Henry Wadsworth Longfellow m. Herman Lohr
- "Desecration Rag" m. Felix Arndt
- "Down Among The Sheltering Palms" w. James Brockman m. Abe Olman
- "La Estrellita" m. Manuel Ponce Also known as "Little Star".
- "Everybody Rag With Me" w. Gus Kahn m. Grace Leboy
- "Fido Is A Hot Dog Now" w. Charles McCarron & Thomas J. Gray m. Raymond Walker
- "Follow The Crowd" w.m. Irving Berlin
- "Gilbert, The Filbert" w. Arthur Wimperis m. Herman Finck
- "Goodbye Girls I'm Through" w. John Golden m. Ivan Caryll
- "He's A Devil In His Own Home Town" w. Grant Clarke & Irving Berlin m. Irving Berlin
- "He's A Rag Picker" w.m. Irving Berlin

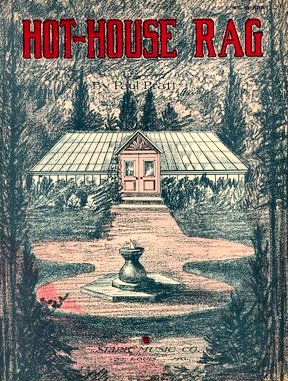

- "I Love the Ladies" by Grant Clarke
- "I Want To Go Back To Michigan, Down On The Farm" w.m. Irving Berlin
- "I Was A Good Little Girl Till I Met You" w. Clifford Harris m. James W. Tate
- "If I Had You" w.m. Irving Berlin
- "If That's Your Idea Of A Wonderful Time, Take Me Home" w.m. Irving Berlin
- "If You Don't Want My Peaches" w.m. Irving Berlin
- "I'll Make A Man Of You" w.m. Arthur Wimperis & Herman Finck
- "In The Candlelight" w.m. Fleta Jan Brown
- "Katyusha's song" composed by Nakayama Shimpei is the first big kayōkyoku (pop music) hit in Japan
- "Keep the Home Fires Burning" w. Lena Guilbert Ford m. Ivor Novello
- "Land" by Irving Berlin
- "A Little Bit Of Heaven Sure They Call It Ireland" w. J. Keirn Brennan m. Ernest R. Ball
- "The Little Ford Rambled Right Along" by Byron Gay & C.R. Foster
- "Love's Own Sweet Song" w. C. C. S. Cushing & E. P. Heath m. Emmerich Kalman
- "Magnetic Rag" m. Scott Joplin
- "Missouri Waltz" w. James Royce Shannon m. Frederick Knight Logan
- "My Bird Of Paradise" Irving Berlin
- "My Croony Melody" w.m. Joe Goodwin & E. Ray Goetz
- "On the 5:15" w. Stanley Murphy m. Henry I. Marshall
- "On The Good Ship Mary Ann" w. Gus Kahn m. Grace Leboy
- "On The Shores Of Italy" w.m. Al Piantadosi, Dave Oppenheim & Jack Glogau
- "Pigeon Walk" m. James V. Monaco
- "Play a Simple Melody" w.m. Irving Berlin
- "Rufus Johnson's Harmony Band" w.m. Shelton Brooks & Maurice Abrahams
- "Same Sort Of Girl" w. Harry B. Smith m. Jerome Kern
- "Settle Down In A One-Horse Town" Irving Berlin
- "Shadowland" w. Blanche Merrill m. Gus Edwards
- "She's Dancing Her Heart Away" w. L. Wolfe Gilbert m. Kerry Mills
- "Sister Susie's Sewing Shirts for Soldiers" w. R. P. Weston m. Herman Darewski
- "The Springtime Of Life" w. Robert B. Smith m. Victor Herbert
- "St. Louis Blues" w.m. W. C. Handy
- "Stay Down Here Where You Belong" w.m. Irving Berlin
- "Sylvia" w. Clinton Scollard m. Oley Speaks
- "Syncopated Walk" w.m. Irving Berlin
- "That's a Plenty" m. Lew Pollack w. Ray Gilbert
- "There's A Little Spark Of Love Still Burning" w. Joe McCarthy m. Fred Fisher
- "They Didn't Believe Me" w. Herbert Reynolds m. Jerome Kern
- "They're On Their Way To Mexico" w.m. Irving Berlin
- "This Is The Life" w.m. Irving Berlin
- "'Twas In September" w. Benjamin Hapgood Burt m. Silvio Hein
- "Twelfth Street Rag" m. Euday L. Bowman
- "Vienna, City of My Dreams" w. (Austrian) Rudolf Sieczynski m. Rudolf Sieczynski
- "Way Out Yonder In The Golden West" w.m. Percy Wenrich
- "What Is Love" Irving Berlin
- "When It's Night Time In Dixieland" w.m. Irving Berlin
- "When The Angelus Is Ringing" w. Joe Young m. Bert Grant
- "When The Grown-up Ladies Act Like Babies" w. Joe Young & Edgar Leslie m. Maurice Abrahams
- "When We've Wound Up the Watch on the Rhine" w. F.W. Mark m. Herman Darewski
- "When You Wore A Tulip" w. Jack Mahoney m. Percy Wenrich
- "When You're A Long, Long Way From Home" w. Sam M. Lewis m. George W. Meyer
- "When You're Away" w. Henry Blossom m. Victor Herbert
- "Who Paid the Rent for Mrs Rip Van Winkle?" w. Alfred Bryan m. Fred Fischer
- "The Yellow Dog Blues" w.m. W. C. Handy
- "You Planted A Rose In The Garden Of Love" w. J. Will Callahan m. Ernest R. Ball
- "Your King and Country Need You (1)" w. Paul Pelham m. W. H. Wallis and Fred Elton
- "Your King and Country Need You (2)" w. Huntley Trevor m. Henry E. Pether
- "Your King and Country Want You" w. and m. Paul Rubens

== Popular recordings ==
- "Aba Daba Honeymoon" by Collins & Harlan
- "Ballin' the Jack" by Prince's Orchestra
- "Belgium Put the Kibosh on the Kaiser" by Mark Sheridan
- "Brindisi" from La traviata, by Enrico Caruso & Alma Gluck
- "The Little Ford Rambled Right Along" by Billy Murray

== Classical music ==
- Lili Boulanger – Trois morceaux pour piano
- John Alden Carpenter – Adventures in a Perambulator (ballet)
- Arthur De Greef – Piano Concerto No. 1 in C Minor
- Frederick Delius – Violin Sonata No. 1
- Ernő Dohnányi – Variations on a Nursery Song
- Marcel Dupré – Psyche (cantata)
- George Enescu – Symphony No. 2 in A, Op. 17
- Herbert Howells – Piano Concerto No. 1
- Charles Ives – Violin Sonata No. 3
- Zoltán Kodály – Duo for violin and cello, Op. 7
- Nikolai Medtner – Sonate-Ballade op. 27
- Carl Nielsen – Serenata in vano
- Sergei Prokofiev
  - Violin Concerto No. 1 in D Major
  - Sarcasms, for piano
  - The Ugly Duckling, for mezzo-soprano and orchestra
- Roger Quilter – A Children's Overture
- Maurice Ravel – Piano Trio in A Minor
- Max Reger – Variations and Fugue on a Theme by Mozart (orchestral version)
- Ottorino Respighi
  - Sinfonia Drammatica
  - La Sensitiva, for mezzo-soprano and orchestra
  - Il Tramonto, for mezzo-soprano and string quartet (or string orchestra)
- Jean Sibelius – The Oceanides
- Ralph Vaughan Williams
  - Symphony No. 2 A London Symphony
  - The Lark Ascending (original version completed)
- Anton Webern – Cello Sonata
- Érik Satie – Sports et divertissements

== Opera ==
- Rutland Boughton – The Immortal Hour
- Jules Massenet – Cléopâtre
- Henri Rabaud – Mârouf, savetier du Caire
- Joaquín Turina – Margot
- Gabriel von Wayditch – Opium Dreams
- Riccardo Zandonai – Francesca da Rimini premiered at the Teatro Regio in Turin on 19 February 1914

== Musical theatre ==
- Adele London production opened at the Gaiety Theatre on May 30
- The Belle of Bond Street Broadway production opened at the Shubert Theatre on March 30 and ran for 48 performances
- Business as Usual London production opened at the Hippodrome on November 16
- Chin-Chin Broadway production opened at the Globe Theatre on October 20 and ran for 295 performances
- The Earl and the Girl London revival opened at the Aldwych Theatre on November 4
- The Girl from Utah Broadway production opened at the Knickerbocker Theatre on August 24 and ran for 120 performances
- The Lilac Domino (libretto by Emmerich von Gatti and Bela Jenbach; music by Charles Cuvillier) Broadway production opened at the 44th Street Theatre on October 28 and ran for 109 performances
- Papa's Darling Broadway production
- The Pretty Mrs Smith Broadway production opened at the Casino Theatre on September 21 and ran for 48 performances
- Szibill by Victor Jacobi, with libretto by Martos Ferenc and Miklós Bródy. First performed on February 27 in Budapest.
- Tonight's The Night Broadway production opened at the Shubert Theatre on December 24 and ran for 112 performances
- Wars of the World Broadway production opened at the Hippodrome Theatre on September 5 and ran for 229 performances
- Watch Your Step Broadway production opened at the New Amsterdam Theatre on December 8 and ran for 175 performances
- When Claudia Smiles Broadway production opened at the 39th Street Theatre on February 2 and moved to the Lyric Theatre on February 23 for a total run of 112 performances

== Births ==
- January 25 – William Strickland, American conductor and organist (d. 1991)
- February 10 – Larry Adler, harmonica virtuoso (d. 2001)
- February 12 – Tex Beneke, American bandleader (d. 2000)
- February 18 – Pee Wee King, country musician (d. 2000)
- March 5 – Philip Farkas, horn player (d. 1992)
- March 6 – Kirill Kondrashin, conductor (d. 1981)
- March 10 – Pilar Manalo Danao, Filipino songwriter (d. 1987)
- March 21 – Paul Tortelier, cellist and composer (d. 1990)
- March 28 – Clara Petrella, Italian operatic soprano (d. 1987)
- March 30 – Sonny Boy Williamson, blues musician (d. 1948)
- April 4 – Frances Langford, American singer and actress (d. 2005)
- April 25 – John Sebastian, harmonica virtuoso (d. 1980)
- April 26 – Wilfrid Mellers, musicologist and composer (d. 2008)
- May 9
  - Carlo Maria Giulini, conductor (d. 2005)
  - Hank Snow, country singer (d. 1999)
- May 13 – Johnnie Wright, American country music singer-songwriter (d. 2011)
- May 18
  - Cacilda Borges Barbosa, Brazilian pianist, conductor and composer (d. 2010)
  - Alla Bayanova, Russian singer (d. 2011)
  - Boris Christoff, operatic bass (d. 1993)
- May 22 – Sun Ra, American musician (d. 1993)
- May 26 – Ziggy Elman, American trumpet player (d. 1968)
- May 31 – Akira Ifukube, composer (d. 2006)
- June 6 – Iris du Pré, pianist, mother of Jacqueline du Pré and Hilary du Pré (d. 1985)
- June 16
  - Colette Maze, French pianist (d. 2023)
  - Eleanor Sokoloff, American pianist and teacher (d. 2020)
- June 28 – Lester Flatt, bluegrass musician (d. 1979)
- June 29 – Rafael Kubelík, Czech-born conductor (d. 1996)
- July 2 – Frederick Fennell, conductor (d. 2004)
- July 5 – Gerda Gilboe, Danish actress and singer (d. 2009)
- July 7 – Serafim Tulikov, Russian and Soviet composer (d. 2004)
- July 8 – Billy Eckstine, jazz musician and singer (d. 1993)
- July 14 – Fred Fox, American French horn player and brass instrument teacher (d. 1949)
- July 24 – Riccardo Malipiero, Italian composer, pianist and music educator (d. 2003)
- July 26
  - Ralph Blane, American composer and singer (d. 1995)
  - Erskine Hawkins, American jazz trumpeter and bandleader (d. 1993)
- August 5 – Stjepan Šulek, Croatian composer (d. 1986)
- August 10 – Witold Małcużyński, Polish pianist (d. 1977)
- August 11 – Hugh Martin, American composer (d. 2011)
- August 12 – Ruth Lowe, Canadian pianist and songwriter (d. 1981)
- August 18 – Irmgard Österwall, Swedish jazz singer (d. 1980)
- August 28 – Glenn Osser, American conductor and arranger (d. 2014)
- September 5 – Minuetta Kessler, née Shumiatcher, concert pianist, classical composer and music educator (d. 2002)
- September 12 – Eddy Howard, singer (d. 1963)
- September 24 – Andrzej Panufnik, composer (d. 1991)
- September 25 – Robert Wright, American composer (d. 2005)
- October 7 – Alfred Drake, American singer and actor (d. 1992)
- October 10 – Ivory Joe Hunter, R&B singer, songwriter and pianist (d. 1974)
- November 15 – Jorge Bolet, pianist and conductor (d. 1990)
- December 3 – Irving Fine, composer (d. 1962)
- December 7 – Alberto Castillo, Argentine tango singer and actor (d. 2002)
- December 14 – Rosalyn Tureck, pianist (d. 2003)
- December 23 – Dezider Kardoš, composer (d. 1991)
- December 29 – Billy Tipton, jazz musician (d. 1989)
- December 30
  - Bert Parks, American singer and actor (Miss America Pageant) (d. 1992)
  - Nicolai Shutorev, American singer (d. 1948)
- date unknown – Rita Abatzi, rebetiko singer (d. 1969)

== Deaths ==
- January 5 – François Cellier, conductor and composer (b. 1849)
- January 13 – Valentin Zubiaurre, Spanish composer and professor of the Madrid Royal Conservatory (b. 1837)
- January 23 – George W. Johnson, singer and pioneer recording artist (b. 1850)
- February 1 – Alexander Dodonov, Russian opera singer (b. 1837)
- March 1 – Tor Aulin, violinist, conductor and composer (b. 1866)
- March 24 – Ellen Franz, pianist and actress (b. 1839)
- March 31 – Hubert von Herkomer, painter, film director and composer (b. 1849)
- May 3 – Carl Kölling, composer of piano music (b. 1831)
- May 10
  - Lillian Nordica, opera singer (b. 1857)
  - Ernst von Schuch, conductor (b. 1846)
- July 1 – Edmund Payne, musical comedy star (b. 1865)
- July 14 – Andrzej Hławiczka, musicologist (b. 1866)
- July 23 – Harry Evans, conductor and composer (b. 1873)
- August 7 – Bolesław Dembiński, composer (b. 1833)
- August 11 – Emil Fischer, operatic bass (b. 1838)
- August 18 – Anna Yesipova, pianist (b. 1851)
- August 28 – Anatoly Lyadov, composer (b. 1855)
- September 2 – K. C. Kesava Pillai, Carnatic composer and poet (b. 1868)
- September 3 – Albéric Magnard, composer (b. 1865)
- September 13 – Robert Hope-Jones, inventor of the theatre organ (b. 1859)
- September 28 – Stevan Mokranjac, composer (b. 1856)
- October 28 – Richard Heuberger, composer (b. 1850)
- November 9 – Jean-Baptiste Faure, operatic baritone and composer (b. 1830)
- December 14 – Giovanni Sgambati, Italian pianist and composer (b. 1841)
- December 16 – Ivan Zajc, composer (b. 1832)
- December 25 – Bernhard Stavenhagen, pianist, composer and conductor (b. 1862)
- December 29/31 – Alfredo D'Ambrosio, Italian composer (b. 1871)
- May Summerbelle
