= List of compositions by Joaquín Turina =

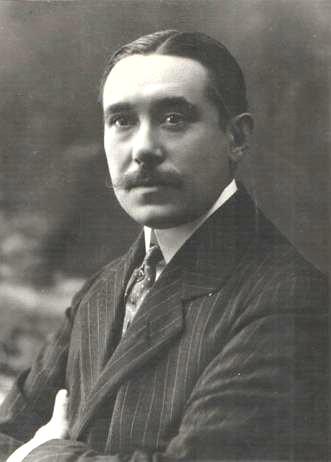
Joaquín Turina

This is a complete list of compositions by Joaquín Turina.

The list is categorized by Genre, and can be sorted in order of composition date (and Opus number order) by clicking on the "Opus" header. (To return to genre categories, reload the webpage.)

== List of compositions ==
Opus	Title	Date	Scoring	Notes
=== Stage ===
–	La Copla, zarzuela	1904	opera	
–	Fea y con gracia, zarzuela	1905	opera	
11	Margot, comedia lírica, 3 acts (Libretto: Gregorio Martínez Serra)	1914	opera	
–	Tragedia Cómica	1915	opera	
–	La mujer del héroe, zarzuela or sainete, 2 acts	1916	opera	sketches; Canción de cuna published separately for soprano and orchestra and for soprano and piano
16	Navidad, incidental music	1916	orchestra	
18	La adúltera penitente, drama, 3 acts (Libretto: G. Martínez Serra)	1917	opera	
25	Jardín de Oriente, opera, 1 act	1923	opera	
27	La Anunciación, comedia (Libretto: Tomás Borrás)	1923	piano quintet	Aparición del arcángel and Intermedio only
–	Pregón de flores, zarzuela: Preludio: Invocación a Sevilla; Aria de Diamela: ¡Ay!, ausencia	1940	opera	incomplete; Preludio scored for piano; Aria scored for soprano and piano
–	El Abanderado, feature film score	1943	orchestra	in collaboration with Turina's pupil Jesús García Leoz
–	Eugenia de Montijo, feature film score	1944	orchestra	in collaboration with Turina's pupil Jesús García Leoz
–	Luis Candelas, feature film score	1947	voice and orchestra	in collaboration with Turina's pupil Jesús García Leoz
=== Vocal ===
–	Plegaria a nuestro padre Jesús de la pasión (Coplas al señor de pasión)	1901	tenor, baritone, small male choir, orchestra	
6	Rima	1910	voice and piano	
–	Misa a nuestro padre Jesús de pasión	1912	tenor, male chorus, orchestra	
19	Poema en forma de canciones	1917	soprano and piano	
–	Plegaria a la santísima Virgen del amparo	1920	tenor, bass, male chorus, chamber orchestra	
–	Plegaria a nuestra señora del amparo	1923	tenor, baritone, male chorus, chamber orchestra	
26	3 Arias	1923	voice and piano	
–	Alabado, para la hermandad de nuestra señora del amparo	1924	tenor and chamber orchestra	
37	Canto a Sevilla	1927	voice and orchestra	
38	Dos canciones (Texts: Cristina de Arteaga)	1926	voice and piano	
39	Corazón de mujer, poema (Text: Cristina de Arteaga)	1926	voice and piano	
–	¡Salve!, retablo Mariano	1928	soprano & tenor voices, orchestra	also version for solo voice and piano
45	Tríptico (Texts: Ramón de Campoamor y Duque de Rivas)	1927	voice and piano	song #1, Farruca, was orchestrated later by the composer: date uncertain.
–	El corazón de Jesús	c.1929?	voice and piano	
–	Saeta en flor de salva a la Virgen de Esperanza	1930	voice and piano	
54	3 Sonetos (Texts: Francisco Rodríguez Marín)	1930	voice and piano	
60	Saeta, en forma de salve, a la Virgen de la Esperanza (Text: Joaquín y Serafín Álvarez Quintero)	1930	voice and piano, or voice and orchestra	
74	Vocalizaciones	1932	soprano and piano	
81	3 Poemas (Texts: Gustavo Adolfo Bécquer)	1933	voice and piano	
90	Homenaje a Lope de Vega (Texts: Félix Lope de Vega)	1935	voice and piano	
–	Plegaria (o Coplas) a nuestro padre Jesús de la vera cruz	1936	tenor, baritone, male chorus, organ, string orchestra	
93	Las musas de Andalucía	1942	voice and piano quintet	
95	Ave Maria	1942	soprano and piano	
=== Orchestra ===
9	La procesión del Rocío	1912	orchestra	
12	Evangelio, poema	1914	orchestra	
23	Sinfonía sevillana	1920	orchestra	
43	Ritmos, fantasía coreográfica	1927	orchestra	
66	Rapsodia sinfónica, Ciclo pianístico V	1931	piano and string orchestra	
–	Primavera sevillana	1943	orchestra	
–	Sinfonía del mar: 1. Preludio (en forma de lied); 2. Episodio trágico (en forma de sonata)	1945	orchestra	unfinished; completed and orchestrated by Manuel Castillo 1981
=== Chamber ===
–	Trio in F major	1904	piano trio	
1	Piano Quintet	1907	piano quintet	
–	Sonata española	1908	violin and piano	published 1993
–	La romanza del quiero y no puedo	1909	cello and piano	
4	String Quartet	1910	string quartet	
7	Escena andaluza	1913	viola solo and piano quintet	
28	El poema de una sanluqueña	1924	violin and piano	
34	La oración del torero	1925	4 lutes or string quartet	
35	Piano Trio No. 1	1926	piano trio	
51	Violin Sonata No. 1	1929	violin and piano	
67	Piano Quartet in A minor	1931	piano quartet	
72	Variaciones clásicas	1932	violin and piano	
76	Piano Trio No. 2	1933	piano trio	
82	Violin Sonata No. 2 (Sonata española)	1934	violin and piano	
87	Serenata	1935	string quartet or string orchestra	
91	Círculo	1936	piano trio	
100	Tema y variaciones, Ciclo plateresco I	1945	harp and piano	
102	Homenaje a Navarra, sobre diseños de Sarasate, Ciclo plateresco III	1945	violin and piano	
=== Guitar ===
29	Sevillana	1923	guitar	
36	Fandanguillo	1925	guitar	
53	Ráfaga	1929	guitar	
61	Sonata	1931	guitar	
69	Homenaje a Tárrega	1932	guitar	
=== Keyboard ===
2	Sevilla	1908	piano	
3	Sonata romántica	1909	piano	
–	Marcha militar	1911	piano	also version for orchestra
5	Rincones sevillanos	1911	piano	
8	3 Danzas andaluzas	1912	piano	
10	Preludio	1913	organ	
13	Musette	1914	organ	
14	Recuerdos de mi rincón	1914	piano	
15	Álbum de viaje	1915	piano	
17	Mujeres españolas, Series 1	1916	piano	
20	Cuentos de España, Series 1	1918	piano	
21	Niñerías, Series 1	1919	piano	
22	Danzas fantásticas	1919	piano	also version for orchestra
24	Sanlúcar de Barrameda	1921	piano	
30	El Cristo de la calavera, leyenda becqueriana	1924	piano	
31	Jardines de Andalucía	1924	piano	
32	La venta de los gatos	1925	piano	
33	El barrio de Santa Cruz, variaciones rítmicas	1925	piano	
40	La leyenda de la Giralda	1926	piano	
41	2 Danzas sobre temas populares españolas	1927	piano	
42	Verbena madrileña	1926	piano	
44	Mallorca	1928	piano	
46	Evocaciones, 3 pieces	1928	piano	
47	Cuentos de España, Series 2	1928	piano	
48	Recuerdos de la antigua España	1929	piano	
49	Viaje marítimo	c.1929?	piano	
50	Toccata and Fugue, Ciclo pianístico I	1928	piano	
52	Miniaturas	1929	piano	
55	5 Danzas gitanas, Series 1	1930	piano	
56	Niñerías, Series 2	1930	piano	
57	Partita in C major, Ciclo pianístico II	1930	piano	
58	Tarjetas postales	1930	piano	
59	Sonata fantasía	1930	piano	
62	Radio Madrid	1931	piano	
63	Jardín de niños	1931	piano	
64	Pieza romántica, Ciclo pianístico III	1931	piano	
65	El castillo de Almodóvar, Ciclo pianístico IV	1931	piano	
68	El Circo	1931	piano	
70	Silhouettes	1932	piano	
71	En la zapatería, short pieces	c.1932?	piano	
73	Mujeres españolas, Series 2	1932	piano	
75	Fantasía italiana	1932	piano	
77	El poema infinito, Trilogía No. 1	1933	piano	
78	Rincones de Sanlúcar, Ciclo pianístico VI	1933	piano	
79	Bailete	1933	piano	
80	Preludios, Ciclo pianístico VII	1933	piano	
83	Fantasía, sobre cinco notas: A.R.B.O.S.	1934	piano	
84	5 Danzas gitanas, Series 2	1934	piano	
85	Ofrenda, Trilogía No. 2	1934	piano	
86	Hipócrates. Trilogía No. 3	1934	piano	
88	Concierto sin orquesta, Ciclo pianístico VIII	1935	piano	
89	Mujeres de Sevilla	1935	piano	
92	En el Cortijo	1940	piano	
94	Fantasía del reloj, 3 momentos	1943	piano	
96	Por las calles de Sevilla	c.1943	piano	
97	Rincón mágico	1943	piano	
98	Poema fantástico	1944	piano	
99	Contemplación, 3 impresiones	1944	piano	
–	Los siete dolores de la Virgen, Estampas: 1. Profecía de Simón; 2. Huida a Egipto	1945	piano	unfinished, only first 2 pieces completed
101	Linterna mágica, impresiones, Ciclo plateresco II	1945	piano	
103	Fantasía cinematográfica, en forma de rondó, Ciclo plateresco IV	1945	piano	
104	Desde mi terraza, estampas	1947	piano	
