= Dancing Around =

1914 musical revue featuring Al Jolson

- Music: Sigmund Romberg and Harry Carroll, additional music by Jack Judge and Jean Gilbert
- Lyrics: Harold Atteridge, additional lyrics by Harry Williams
- Book: Harold Atteridge
- Productions: Winter Garden Theatre 1914

Dancing Around is a two-act musical revue with music by Sigmund Romberg and Harry Carroll and lyrics and book by Harold Atteridge. The production was "the first show in which Al Jolson received top billing from the start." As a revue, the score features songs from multiple composers and lyricists, notably featuring the songs "Sister Susie's Sewing Shirts for Soldiers" and "It's a Long Way to Tipperary." However, the Grace Leboy song "Everybody Rag With Me", commonly associated with the musical in sheet music and recordings popularized by Jolson, did not appear in the original production, but rather was added during a tour. Jolson appeared in blackface, performing the "Everybody Rag With Me" number and the encore without the makeup. Performances began at the Winter Garden Theatre in New York on October 10, 1914, running for 145 performances before closing on February 13, 1915.

== List of musical numbers ==
- "The Army Club"
- "When Tommy Atkins Smiles at All the Girls"
- "Never Trust a Soldier Man"
- "My Rainbow Beau"
- "I Was Born on the Aisle of Man"
- "There's Something About You"
- "My Lady of the Telephone"
- "The Call of the Colors"
- "Somebody's Dancing with My Girl"
- "The Afternoon Tea"
- "Seeking for Sigfried"
- "A Fashion Slave"
- "Venetia"
- "He Is Sweet, He Is Good"
- "The Shuffling Shivaree"
- "When an Englishman Marries a Parisian"
- "I Want to Be in Norfolk"
- "Oh, You John"
- "Sister Susie's Sewing Shirts for Soldiers"
- "It's a Long Way to Tipperary"
- "Oh, Tennessee, I Hear You Calling Me"
