= Follow the Crowd =

Follow the Crowd may refer to:

- Follow the Crowd (film), a 1918 film starring Harold Lloyd
- "Follow the Crowd" (song), a 1914 song composed by Irving Berlin
