= Randolph Sutton =

- Sheet music cover, 1930

Background information
- Born: John Randolph Sutton; 24 July 1888; Clifton, Bristol, England
- Died: 28 February 1969 (aged 80) Brixton, London, England
- Genres: Variety show, novelty
- Occupation: Singer
- Years active: 1910–1969

John Randolph Sutton (24 July 1888 – 28 February 1969) was an English singer and comic entertainer in music hall and variety shows.

== Life and career ==
Sutton was born in Clifton, Bristol. He made his first stage appearance in a concert at Burnham-on-Sea in 1905, and was so well received that he left his job with a printing company to start a performing career. He made his Bristol stage debut in 1910, and his London debut in 1915. He rapidly became popular as a singer and entertainer, touring around the country, and always performed in top hat and tails, with a combination of "charm and cheekiness".

Sutton was a prolific recording artist during the late 1920s and 1930s, and many of his records are of a suggestively humorous nature. Among his recordings were "Jolly Good Company" (1931) and "The Sun Has Got His Hat On" (1932). While his best-known song (though first performed by Fred Barnes) was "On Mother Kelly's Doorstep", this was never recorded commercially, but private recordings were made and subsequently released on commercial compilations, including one recorded as late as January 1969, shortly before his death. He sung 'On Mother Kelly's Doorstep' on John Betjeman's 1962 BBC television programme 'Bristol My Home'.

He appeared regularly in BBC radio broadcasts from 1932, billed as "Britain's Premier Light Comedian". He was also a star and producer of pantomime, and one of the modern era's earliest male principal boys. As part of Don Ross's show Thanks For the Memory, he appeared at the Royal Variety Performance in 1948. He continued to appear in radio and television broadcasts such as The Good Old Days, and in 1966 made a guest appearance as himself in Coronation Street.

He made his final stage appearance at the City Hall Theatre in St Albans, Hertfordshire on 26 February 1969 and died two days later. He was cremated at Golders Green Crematorium on 5 March and his ashes placed in the Garden of Remembrance. A memorial plaque has been erected on the east wall of the West Memorial Court there, as well as a green plaque outside his Bristol birthplace.
