= Jack Leon =

- Born: Judah Leon Aronoff; 24 April 1905; Kiev, Russian Empire
- Origin: London, England
- Died: 9 March 1967 (aged 61) Glasgow, Scotland
- Occupations: Musician, bandleader, conductor
- Instrument: Violin
- Years active: 1928–1967

Jack Leon (born Judah Leon Aronoff; 24 April 1905 – 9 March 1967) was a Russian-born British dance band and orchestra leader and conductor, of easy listening and light orchestral music.

== Life and career ==
Born in Kiev, the son of a Jewish jeweller, he moved with his family to Antwerp in 1906, and then to Deptford in London in 1914. He learned the violin, and while in his teens formed the East London Philharmonic Orchestra. He began using the name Jack Leon professionally, and became a British citizen.

He formed Jack Leon's Symphonic Dance Band in 1928, and the following year began recording light orchestral music and novelty songs for the Piccadilly label. In 1931 he recorded one of the first versions of the song "Jolly Good Company", and also recorded with vocalist Al Bowlly.

From 1933, he was musical director at the Prince of Wales Theatre in London, and he also conducted the London Symphony Orchestra and the Guildhall Orchestra in the 1930s. He made his first BBC radio broadcasts in 1938, and from 1940 made regular broadcasts from the London Casino. He was also musical advisor for the Theatre Royal, Drury Lane.

During the Second World War, he featured on some 324 editions of the radio programme Music While You Work, the greatest number of any bandleader. After the end of the war, he appeared regularly on Variety Bandbox, as well as Music While You Work and Morning Music. With his New Concert Orchestra, he also recorded extensively in the 1950s for the Mood Music easy listening record label.

In 1956, he moved to Glasgow, and conducted the Scottish Variety Orchestra, continuing to broadcast several times a week. The orchestra featured on many Scottish television programmes, including A Song for Everyone, featuring Kenneth McKellar, and The Andy Stewart Show. He left the BBC in 1966, and established his own orchestra, which featured on the programme Breakfast Special.

He died from a heart attack in Glasgow in 1967, aged 61.
