= Danzas Gitanas, Op. 55 =

Work for solo piano by Joaquín Turina

Cinco danzas gitanas, Op. 55 (Five gypsy dances) is a work for solo piano by Joaquín Turina.

== Structure ==
The piece is divided up into five dances:

- Zambra
- Danca de la seduccion
- Danza ritual
- Generalife
- Sacro-monte

== Recordings ==
=== Piano ===
- Turina, J.: Piano Music, Vol. 1 - Fantastic Dances / Gypsy Dances / 3 Andalusian Dances - Jordi Masó - Naxos 8.557150
