= Tom Mellor (songwriter) =

English songwriter (1880–1926)

Thomas William Mellor (25 May 1880 – July 1926) was an English songwriter.

He was born in Lambeth, London. His first successful song was "I Wouldn’t Leave My Little Wooden Hut For You", written with Charles Collins in 1905, which launched the career of music hall star Daisy Dormer.

Other successful songs included "I Like Your Old French Bonnet" (with Harry Gifford and Alf J. Lawrance, 1906, performed by Harry Fay), "If I hadn't got a girl like you" (with Gifford and Lawrance, 1907, performed by Gordon Stretton), "My Indiana Queen" and "She's somebody's sweet heart" (both with Gifford, 1909, performed by Gordon Stretton), "There's a brown gal way down in Old Dahomey" (with Gifford, 1910, performed by Gordon Stretton), "It’s Nice To Have A Friend" (with Gifford, 1913, performed by Florrie Forde), "When It’s Apple Blossom Time In Normandy" (written with Gifford and Huntley Trevor, 1913), "We’re Irish And Proud Of It, Too" (written with Gifford and Fred Godfrey, 1914), "All the Boys in Khaki Get the Nice Girls" (with Gifford, 1915) and "Save Your Kisses Till The Boys Come Home" (with Gifford and Godfrey, 1915).

Mellor served in the Royal Naval Air Service towards the end of the First World War. He died in Lambeth in 1926, aged 46.
