= Jolly Good Company =

- 1932 sheet music cover

Single
- Released: 1931
- Songwriter(s): Huntley Trevor (as Raymond Wallace)

"Jolly Good Company" (or "Here We Are Again, Jolly Good Company") is a 1931 song written by English songwriter Huntley Trevor using the pseudonym Raymond Wallace.

The song was published in 1931 by the firm of Campbell Connelly. It was immediately recorded by several leading British acts, including Jack Leon, Bobbie Comber, Randolph Sutton, Billy Cotton, Jay Wilbur, Jack Hylton, and Leslie Sarony. In 1932 it was adopted as the theme song of The Canada Dry Ginger Ale Program on American radio, starring Jack Benny.

The song's refrain has remained well known: "Here we are again, happy as can be / All good friends [or "...pals..."] and jolly good company...".
