= Fred Barnes (performer) =

English singer

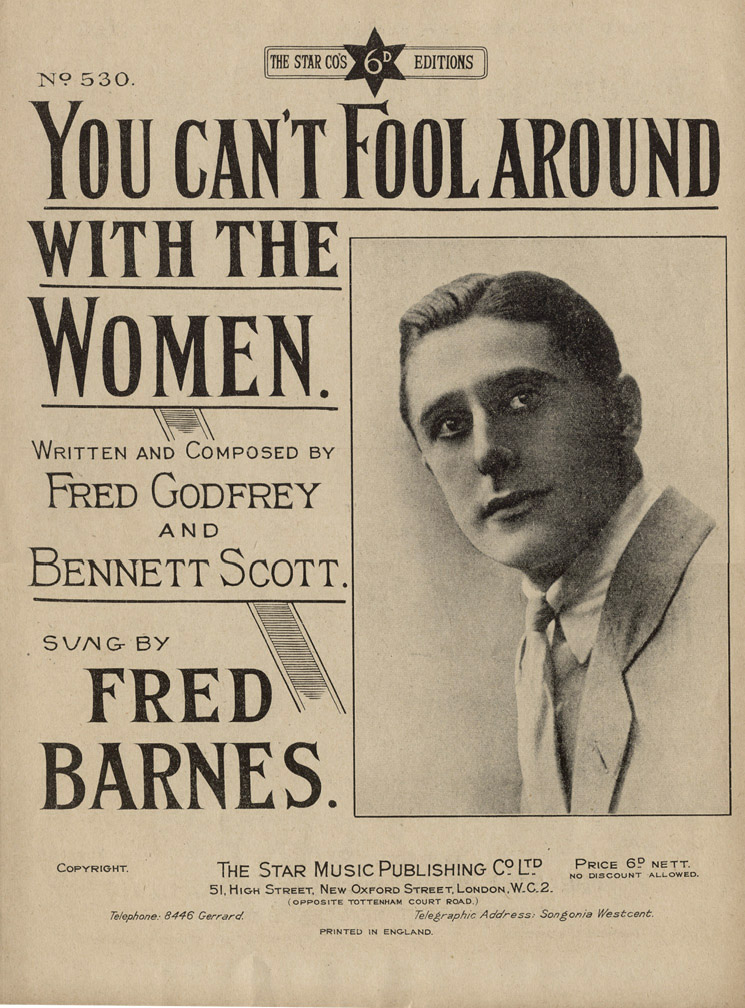
- 1920 sheet music

Background information
- Born: Frederick Jester Barnes; 31 May 1885; Saltley, Birmingham, England
- Died: 23 October 1938 (aged 53) Southend-on-Sea, Essex, England
- Genre: Music hall
- Occupation: Singer
- Years active: 1906–1938

Frederick Jester Barnes (31 May 1885 – 23 October 1938) was an English music hall singer known for his signature song, "The Black Sheep of the Family", which he first performed in 1907. Although popular on stage, Barnes became infamous for his erratic private life and was often named in frequent controversies reported by the press. Openly gay, Barnes retired to Southend-on-Sea and performed in seaside pubs, notably The Cricketers Hotel, Westcliff-on-Sea. Suffering from terminal tuberculosis and alcoholism, Barnes died from coal gas poisoning at the age of 53.

== Biography ==
=== Life and career ===
Barnes was born at 219 Great Lister Street, Saltley, Birmingham, England. The son of a butcher, Barnes became interested in performing as a result of going to see Vesta Tilley in 1895. Encouraged by the popular pantomime performer Dorothy Ward, he made his debut at the Gaiety Theatre, Birmingham in March 1906, and gave his first notable performance playing the Duke of Solihull in Cinderella at the Alexandra Theatre, Birmingham, the same year. It was while starring in the pantomime that Barnes acquired his first agent and attracted the attention of another Birmingham-born music hall artist, George Lashwood, who, in Fred's own words, 'took me in hand... [placed] at my disposal, free and unasked, the lessons of his long and brilliant career'.

It was following Cinderella's fourteen-week run that Barnes first performed in London, persuaded by fellow cast members, The Eight Lancashire Lads, to travel with them. Upon his arrival, Barnes played the hated first slot on the bills. However, this was to change when he decided to try out a new song which he had written, "The Black Sheep of the Family", at the Hackney Empire in 1907. It was a huge success and was to remain Barnes' most popular song. As Barnes said in his account of his life ('How success ruined me'), his name was 'made in a single night'. With this impressive start to his career he spent the next few years establishing himself. By 1911, he was top of the bill on all of the major circuits and principal boy in a number of pantomimes.

In 1913, his father committed suicide. Two weeks later, Barnes performed at the Birmingham Hippodrome, 'a place full of memories of my father. To this day I don't know how I got through that week'. The Birmingham Gazette of 30 August commented, 'Fred Barnes has this week proved the hollowness of the old saying that an artiste is never appreciated in his own town. He has gone a long way towards packing the house at every performance at the Hippodrome'. Following his father's death, Fred's career continued to improve, and he toured widely, including visits to Australia and South Africa. His other successful songs included "Give Me the Moonlight" (1917) and "On Mother Kelly's Doorstep".

=== Private life ===
Barnes was openly gay. In an interview with The Era in 1914, he stated that he had no vacant dates for the next three years and held contracts for the next ten. This was when his personal problems, namely spending and drinking too much, began. He attributed these to dealing with both the death of his father and his newfound success and popularity. The large sums of money he was earning and which he inherited led him to begin spending extravagantly – a habit he found hard to break when he was no longer earning any money. But it was drinking which was to ruin Barnes' career. He missed performances, went on stage incapable of singing or dancing and generally put less and less care into his performances. This led to his being moved to a less and less desirable position on the bill until he was finally back at first turn. Managers grew wary of him and soon his outstanding contracts were paid off and he was without work altogether. He experienced extremes of success and failure, and escaped to London from his father and his father's lifestyle as a young gay man.

=== Scandal and controversies ===
In 1924, Barnes was sentenced to a month in jail for driving in Hyde Park while drunk and in a dangerous manner and without a licence. Following the arrest, he was deemed a "menace to His Majesty's fighting forces" (because of the topless sailor who had been travelling with him at the time of the accident), and was banned from attending the Royal Tournament, an annual military tattoo. Despite this, he returned each year and successfully evaded discovery.

=== Later life and death ===
By the mid-1930s, Barnes was suffering from tuberculosis. His failing health led him and his lover and manager John Senior to move to Southend-on-Sea. By this time any work consisted of playing the piano in pubs while Senior collected tips. Barnes's rent was paid for by Charles Ashmead Watson, while also funding lighting and clothing costs, as well as giving them a weekly allowance of 30 shillings. Barnes made a number of attempts to return to the stage, most of which were unsuccessful; a final job in the summer of 1938, playing his songs in the Cricketers Inn, Westcliff-on-Sea, restored some of his confidence in his own ability. By the winter of that year, he was told that he had three months to live causing the comedian to commit suicide soon after.

Barnes died at his lodgings in St Ann's Road, Southend-on-Sea, on 23 October 1938. An inquest found that the cause of death was from the effects of coal gas poisoning, though the gas tap had been turned off, and suicide was ruled out.

When the jury at the inquest into Barnes's death commented that Watson had been "wonderful", he replied "He was a great man". Naomi Jacob shared the view, and opined that Watson "had one of the kindest hearts in the world and was a fine artist and no mean dancer". The Era commented on Barnes's "singularly pleasing popularity". His funeral on 2 November 1938, was attended by hundreds of people at St Saviour's Church, Saltley with nearby streets crowded with mourners.

Barnes was free with facts in interviews and in his own account of his life; his numerous publicity stunts which included announcements of his 'near-death' in a fire and a fake marriage. On occasion, he was known to walk around London at the height of his success with a marmoset perched on his shoulder (later, playing the pubs in Southend, he made do with a chicken).

On 18 October 2021 a blue plaque commemorating Fred Barnes was erected by the British Music Hall Society and unveiled by their then President Paul O'Grady, at Barnes' former home in Maida Vale.

== Bibliography ==
- Paul Bailey, The wavy-haired, blue-eyed adonis : Fred Barnes (1885-1938). In: Three queer lives : an alternative biography of Fred Barnes, Naomi Jacob and Arthur Marshall (London : Hamish Hamilton, 2001) p. 33-66
- Anthony Barker, Music Hall magazine, issue MH30
