= Dezider Kardoš =

Slovak composer (1914 - 1991)

Dezider Kardoš (23 December 1914 – 18 March 1991), was a Slovak composer, one of the main representatives of modern Slovak classical music. He was awarded the title National Artist of Czechoslovakia in 1975. In 2006 he was matriculated into the Gold Book of the Slovak Performing and Mechanical Rights Society (SOZA).

== Life ==
After finishing the high school (1933), he studied at the Music and Drama Academy where he attended courses of composition of Alexander Moyzes and at the same time attended the lectures in musicology, aesthetics and arts history at the Faculty of Arts of the Comenius University. Kardoš graduated in 1937 and resumed his studies Master's School of the Prague Conservatory up to 1939, where he was a student of Vítězslav Novák. From 1939 to 1945 he was head of the Slovak Radio Music Department in Prešov, from 1945 to 1951 head of the Czechoslovak Radio Music Department in Košice and since 1951 in Bratislava. In 1952 he became the first director of the Slovak Philharmonic. In the years 1955–1963 he was the president of the Slovak Composers Union. Kardoš was also a successful tutor of composition, from 1961 to 1984 he taught at the Academy of Performing Arts in Bratislava (since 1968 as professor of composition). He was the founder of modern symphonisme. He was one of the most important composers of the 20th century, forming the foundation of the Slovak music culture. It has its place in the forefront of modern Slovak symfonizme. The original production, which encompass almost all music genres, based on two sources of inspiration - from the Slovak national music and modern world. Dynamic process, unique instrumentation, vigorously, resolute and ardent lyricism, a sense of peace and perfection of construction are the hallmarks of his works, which belong to the permanent values of European music. For his work, he was in 1975 awarded the title of National Artist.

== List of Compositions ==
=== Orchestral Compositions ===
- Concerto for Piano and Orchestra no. 2, op. posth. (finished and revised by Vladimír Bokes in 1994)
- Philharmony Concert op. 57 (1990)
- Symfonietta op. 55 (1957)
- Bratislava Overture (Bratislavská predohra) op. 52 (1981)
- The Concert for Violin and Orchestra op. 51 (1980)
- Sinfonietta domestica op. 50 (1979)
- Slovakophony. Cycle of symphonic variations on the goral theme op. 46 (1976)
- Symphony no. 6 op. 45 (1974)
- Partita for Twelve String Instruments op. 43 (1972)
- Res philharmonica, symphonic overture for large orchestra op. 41 (1971)
- Concerto for Piano and Orchestra no. 1 op. 40 (1969)
- Symphony no. 5 op. 37 (1964)
- Concerto for Stringed Instruments op. 35 (1963)
- Symphony no. 4 'Piccola' op. 34 (1962)
- Symphony no. 3 (1961)
- Heroic Ballad (Hrdinská balada) (1959)
- The Concert for Orchestra op. 30 (1957)
- Symphony no. 2‚ 'O rodnej zemi' ('On Native Heath') op. 28 (1955)
- Two Dance Scenes for SĽUK op. 24 (1952)
- Easternslovak Overture (Východoslovenská predohra) op. 22 (1951)
- Easternslovak Dance Scenes (Východoslovenské tanečné scény) op. 20 (1949)
- The Overture for Symphonic Orchestra (Predohra pre symfonický orchester) op. 16 (1947)
- Symphonic Overture quasi Phantasy 'Moja rodná' ('My Native') op. 14 (1946, rev. 1985)
- Symphony no. 1 op. 10 (1942)
- Allegro sinfonico (Finale) op. 4 (1937)

=== Works for solo voice(s) or speaker, choir, and orchestra ===
- Symphony no. 7 op. 53 (1984)
- Hymn of a Free Young (Hymna slobodnej mládeže) (1956)
- Greeting to a Great Country (Pozdrav veľkej zemi) op. 25 (1953)
- Údernícka (1951)
- Song of a Happy Children (Pieseň šťastných detí) (1951)
- Peace Cantata (Mierová kantáta) op. 21b (1950)

=== Chamber works instrumental ===
- String Quartet no. 5 op. 58 (1991)
- String Quartet no. 4 op. 54 (1985)
- Musica rustica slovaca (1979)
- String Quartet no. 3 op. 49 (1978)
- The Concert for Quintet of Wind-instruments op. 47 (1977)
- String Quartet no. 2 op. 38 (1966)
- Quintet for Five Wind-Instruments op.6 (1938, rev. 1978)
- String Quartet no. 1 op. 3 (1936)

=== Chamber works instrumental – solo ===
- Partita for Solo Violin op. 56 (1988)
- Elevazioni per organo da concerte op. 39a (1968)
- Praeludium quasi una fantasia (1960)
- Piano Compositions for Young op. 27 (1956)
- Studies for Piano op. 15 (1947)
- Piano Suite no. 2 op. 5 (1937)
- Piano Suite no. 1 op. 1 (1934)
- Two Compositions for Piano (1933)

=== Chamber works instrumental – piano solo ===
- Bagatelles op. 18 (1948)

=== Chamber works – instruments and voices ===
- Songs of Life (Spevy o živote) op. 44 (1973)
- Song about Love (Piesne o láske) op. 2 (1935, rev. 1966)

=== Chamber instrumental with voices – voice with piano accompaniment ===
- Let's Help the Worbler (Pomôžeme slávikovi). Songs for Children op. 31a (1958)

=== Folklore adaptations ===
- Amatory and Maiden Pieces from Eastern Slovakia (Ľúbostné a dievčenské hry z východného Slovenska) (1977)
- Three Easternslovak Impressions (Tri východoslovenské impresie) op. 42c (1973)
- Three Songs from Zemplín (Tri spevy zo Zemplína) op. 42a (1972)
- Three Old Songs from Eastern Slovakia (Tri staré piesne z východného Slovenska) op. 42b (1971)
- Two Songs from Eastern Slovakia (Dve piesne z východného Slovenska) op. 36b (1964)
- Two Easternslovak Songs (Dve východoslovenské piesne) op. 31b (1961)
- Či ma tu pobočkáš op. 29a (1957)
- Ľecela páva op. 29a (1957)
- Na Prešporku, Dunaju op. 29a (1957)
- Morena (1952)
- Easterslovak Songs (Východoslovenské spevy) (Šesť slovenských ľudových piesní) op. 21a (1950)
- Partizánska a Čapajevská op. 19 (1949)
- Easterslovak Songs (Východoslovenské spevy) op. 17 (1948)
- Easterslovak Songs and Dances (Východoslovenské spevy a tance) op. 19a (1948)
- Easterslovak Carols (Východoslovenské koledy) (Východoslovenské vianočné spevy) op. 13b (1945)
- Valalské spevy op. 12 (1944)
- V Zemplíne spievajú op. 9 (1940)
- Song from Eastern Slovakia (Spevy východného Slovenska) (Východoslovenské ľudové spevy) op. 8 (1939)
- Four Slovak Folk Songs (Štyri slovenské ľudové piesne) op. 7 (1938)
- Four Slovak Forest Robber Songs (Štyri zbojnícke slovenské piesne) (Slovenské zbojnícke piesne) (1937)

=== Choral ===
- Októbrové poémy op. 48 (1977)
- Pozdrav op. 31/c (1961)
- Nech žije 1. Máj (1952)
- Zem moja rodná op. 19b (1949)
- Dva mužské sbory (1940)
- Spev o láske op. 39b (1967)
- Cyklus detských sborov (1937)

=== Music for radio ===
- Insane (Pomätená) op. 13a (1945)

=== Sound track ===
- Uprising in Martin (Povstanie v Martine) (1954)
- The Rainbow over Slovakia (Dúha nad Slovenskom) op. 23 (1952) Director: V. Bahna
- Shine (Svit) op. 11 (1943)
- Synthetic Fibres (Umelé vlákna) (1943), Director: P. Bielik

== Bibliography ==
- Zavarský, E.: Súčasná slovenská hudba. Bratislava: Závodský, 1947, pp. 109–113.
- Nováček, Z.: Dezider Kardoš: Počiatky a rast. Bratislava: SVKL, 1955.
- Faltin, P.: Hrdinská balada Dezidera Kardoša. In: Slovenská hudba, 1960, No. 5, pp. 234–238.
- Faltin, P.: III. symfónia Dezidera Kardoša. In: Slovenská hudba, 1961, No. 11, pp. 461–467.
- Donovalová, V.: Niektoré vývojové črty slovenskej programovej hudby. In: Kresánek, J. (ed.) K problematike súčasnej hudby. Bratislava: SAV, 1963, pp. 102–116.
- Hrušovský, I.: Slovenská hudba v profiloch a rozboroch. Bratislava: ŠHV, 1964, pp. 254–274.
- Vajda, I. – Jurík, M.: 20 rokov slovenskej hudobnej tvorby v diskusii. In: Slovenská hudba, 1965, No. 7, pp. 303–309.
- Vajda, I. – Jurík, M.: 20 rokov slovenskej hudobnej tvorby v diskusii. In: Slovenská hudba, 1965, No. 10, pp. 422–432.
- Mokrý, L.: Hudba. In: Rosenbaum, K. (ed.): Slovenská kultúra 1945–1965. Bratislava: Obzor, 1965, pp. 75–94.
- Podracký, I.: Národný umelec Dezider Kardoš jubiluje. In: Hudobný život, 1979, No. 24, p. 3.
- Hatrík, J.: Dezider Kardoš: III. sláčikové kvarteto, op. 49. In: Hudobný život, 1980, No. 17, p. 5.
- Burlas, L.: Slovenská hudobná moderna. Bratislava: Obzor, 1983, pp. 151–156.
- Berger, I.: O symfonizme národného umelca Dezidera Kardoša. In: Hudobný život, 1984, No. 24, p. 3.
- Nováček, Z.: Osobnosť pevných zásad. K sedemdesiatke národného umelca Dezidera Kardoša. In: Pravda 20. 12. 1984.
- Chalupka, Ľ.: Dejiny slovenskej hudby (Ed. O. Elschek). Bratislava: ASCO Art and Science, 1996, pp. 273–341.
- Faltin, P.: Slovenská hudobná tvorba v rokoch 1956–1965. In: Slovenská hudba, 1997, No. 3–4, pp. 175–210.
- Elschek, O.: Slovenská hudba medzi minulosťou a dneškom. In: Slovenská hudba, 1997, No. 3–4, pp. 211–233.
- Zvara, V.: Dezider Kardoš. In: Jurík, M. - Zagar, P. (ed.): 100 slovenských skladateľov. Bratislava: NHC, 1998, pp. 140–144.
- Chalupka, Ľ.: Dezider Kardoš: Hrdinská balada pre sláčikový orchester op. 32. In: Hudobný život, 2001, No. 5, pp. 15–18.

== See also ==
- The 100 Greatest Slovak Albums of All Time
