= George Alex Stevens =

George Alexander Stevens (1875–19 April 1954) was an English songwriter and musical show director. In more than 60 years of songwriting he had more than 2000 songs published under the names "G. Alex Stevens", 'Geo A Stevens' and "George A. Stevens". He was known as a writer of music hall songs.

For many years Stevens was a close friend of Charlie Chaplin's father in Kennington, London, composing songs for him. His first successful song was "The Huntsman", sung by Dan Leno at a Royal Command Performance before King Edward VII in 1901. His hits were sung by Marie Lloyd, Albert Chevalier, R. G. Knowles, Gracie Fields, Florrie Forde, and many others.

One of his best-known songs was "On Mother Kelly's Doorstep". The song was first published in 1925, when it was recorded by Tom Barratt, and was made popular by Randolph Sutton although Sutton did not record it for many years. Danny La Rue's 1968 version of the song reached number 33 in the UK singles chart; La Rue later adopted the song as his theme tune.

Kate Carney featured his song "Mother I Love You" for more than 40 years. In later years he wrote "Chump Chop and Chips" for Gracie Fields. Randolph Sutton sang his "When the Harvest Moon is Shining" on early TV, and comedian Reg Dixon revived his "I'm Shy Mary Ellen, I'm Shy", first published in 1910.
