= Your King and Country Need You (Pelham) =

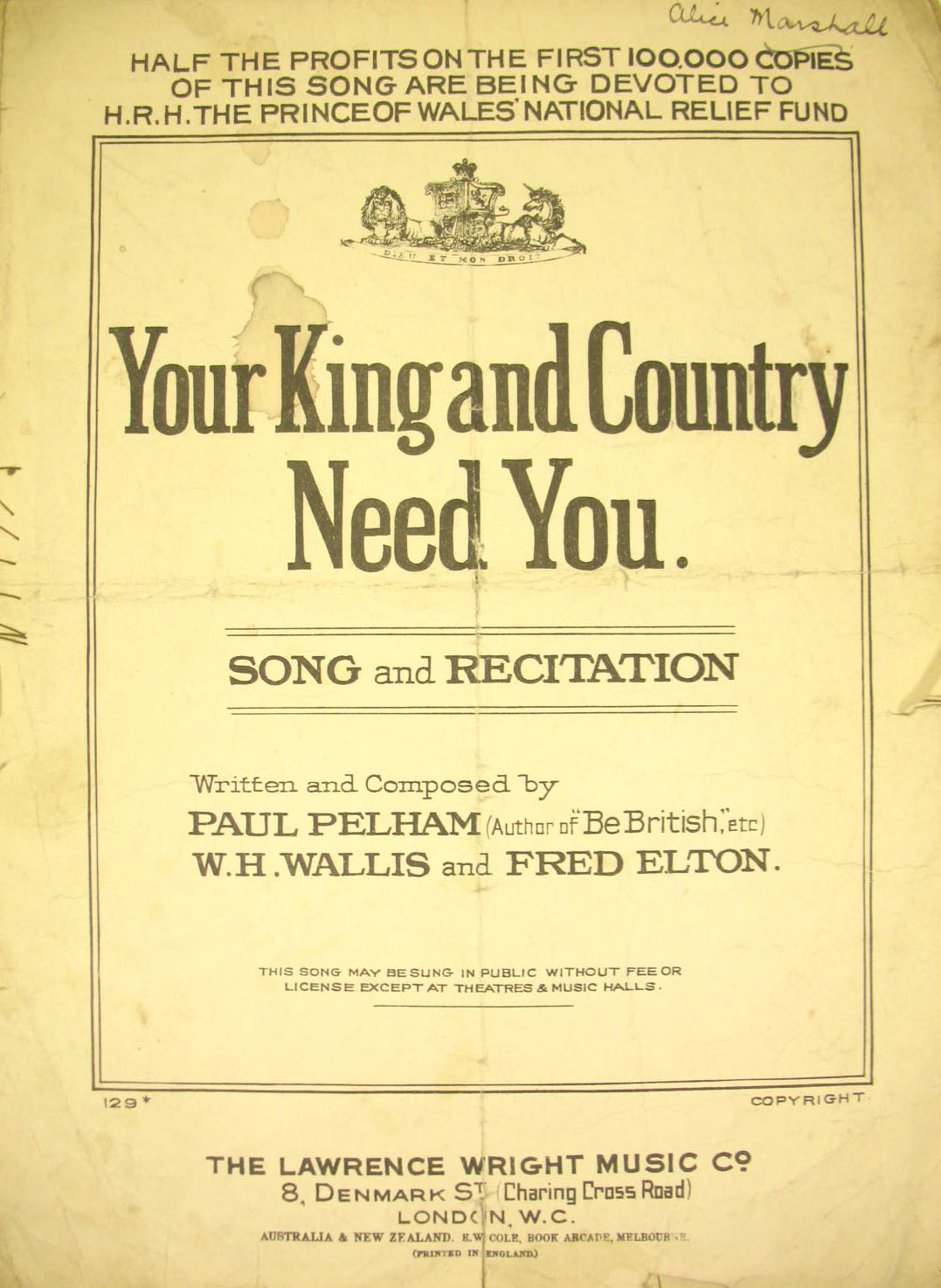
Original sheet music from 1914.

Several different recruiting songs with the name "Your King and Country Want/Need You" were popularised in Britain at the beginning of the First World War. Your King and Country Need You was a popular song and recitation, with words by Paul Pelham, and music by W. H. Wallis and Fred Elton, published in London at the start of the war in 1914 by Lawrence Wright Music. It was written as a recruiting song with the aim of persuading men to volunteer to fight in the War. Half the profits on the first 100,000 copies were to be given to the "H.R.H. Prince of Wales' National Relief Fund".

== Lyrics ==
There was an optional recitation for after the second verse. The following complete set of lyrics are taken from the original sheet music:

Verse 1:

Have you seen the Royal Proclamation? Caused by War's alarms,
Words addressed to all the population, Calling us to arms!
Not for mad ambitions greed England asks us in her need To face the foeman's guns!
'Tis for honour, truth and right, For glorious liberty we fight –
To crush the envious foemens might That England wants her sons!

Verse 2:

When the signal flashed around the nation, What an answer came
Filling foes with sudden consternation – Putting them to shame
Little did they think that We Were prepared on land and sea – a great and glorious thing
To know the answer to the call Is each one ready, great or small,
So Britain's Sons will one and all, Now sing "God Save The King"!

Chorus (after each verse):

Come on Tommy – Come on Jack,
We'll guard the home till you come back,
Come on Sandy – Come on Pat, For you're true blue!
Down your tools and leave your benches,
Say 'Good-bye' to all the wenches,
Take your gun, and 'May God speed you!'
For your King and Country need you!

Recitation (optional for after verse 2 then followed by chorus for verse 2):

This strife is not our seeking,
Our watchword has been "Peace"
But, now John Bull has started,
The struggle shall not cease –
Until this German bully,
With all his bounce and brag,
Shall pay the debt he owes us –
And our glorious English flag;
This is no time for fooling –
Let each one do his best,
A truce to spotting winners –
Give the Football news a rest;
The dandy clerk and navvy –
Each manly mother's son,
One and all are wanted –
To learn to use the gun;
They're coming from Australia,
We know their sterling worth,
From Canada they're flocking –
To the land that gave them birth;
The struggle will be deadly,
But, while we're Briton's true,
We'll fight just like our fathers –
Till we see the whole thing through;
So "Up for dear old England!"
Whatever may befall,
We'll stand a band of brothers,
"Each for each" and "All for all",
The Bull-dog's got his teeth in
And you bet he won't let go –
And there's one thing I would ask you,
Are we downhearted? – No!

== Recordings ==
There are no known recordings of this version of the song.
