= When We've Wound Up the Watch on the Rhine =

1914 song

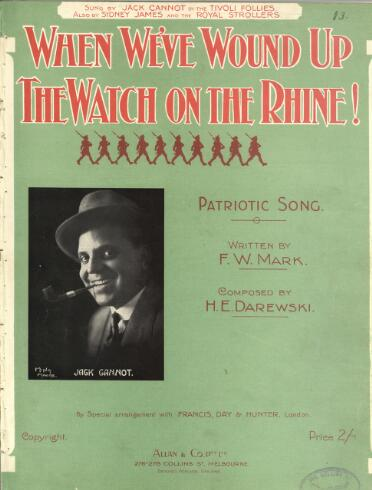

Song
- Recorded: 1914
- Genre: Patriotic, War
- Label: Columbia Records
- Songwriter(s): F.W. Mark
- Composer(s): Herman Darewski

"When We've Wound Up the Watch on the Rhine" is a 1914 British patriotic music hall song composed by Herman Darewski with lyrics by F.W. Mark, that first appeared during the opening months of the First World War. It featured in the Albert de Courville-produced revue Business as Usual in November 1914 at the Hippodrome. Performers who sang or recorded the song included Violet Loraine and Stanley Kirkby at a time when there was a large popular demand for patriotic numbers. The title is a play on the German patriotic song "The Watch on the Rhine", the process of winding up a mechanical watch, and "winding up" something that has ended; the song is a satirical parody of the German song.

In 1945 at the Yalta Conference, British Prime Minister Winston Churchill sang the song to his Second World War allies Franklin D. Roosevelt and Joseph Stalin after word arrived that Allied troops had captured Cleves on the Rhine.

== Bibliography ==
- Gilbert, Martin. Winston S. Churchill: Road to Victory, 1941–1945. Rosetta Books, 2015.
- Kröller, Eva-Marie. Writing the Empire: The McIlwraiths, 1853–1948. University of Toronto Press, 2021.
- Martland, Peter. Recording History: The British Record Industry, 1888-1931. Rowman & Littlefield, 2013.
- Self, Geoffrey. Light Music in Britain since 1870: A Survey. Routledge, 2017.
