= 1914 in British music =

This is a summary of 1914 in music in the United Kingdom.

== Events ==
- 21 January – Edward Elgar makes the first recordings of his music, including the miniature "Carissima" prior to its public premiere.
- February – Regal Recordings issues its first records.
- 2 February – The restrictions on performances of Wagner's opera Parsifal outside of Bayreuth having been withdrawn, the first staged British performance opens at London's Royal Opera House, Covent Garden.
- 27 February – George Butterworth's The Banks of Green Willow is premièred at West Kirby, Liverpool, conducted by Adrian Boult.
- 16 March – A new concert hall, the Usher Hall, opens in Edinburgh.
- c. June – First publication of Orchestration, the classic book by Cecil Forsyth.
- 26 August – Rutland Boughton's "fairy opera" The Immortal Hour is premièred at Glastonbury Assembly Rooms as part of the inaugural Glastonbury Festival, co-founded by the socialist composer. On 5 August the first concert concluded with the choral song "The Last Post" by Charles Villiers Stanford in lieu of the Grail Dance from Parsifal "owing to the outbreak of war."
- 24 October – Italian-born Welsh-resident operatic soparano Adelina Patti gives her final public performance, in a Red Cross concert for the benefit of First World War veterans, at London's Royal Albert Hall.
- 31 December – English composer Ralph Vaughan Williams, aged 42, volunteers for war service, initially as a private with the Royal Army Medical Corps.

== Popular music ==
- Paul Rubens – "Your King and Country Want You"

== Classical music: new works ==
- Kenneth J. Alford – Colonel Bogey March
- Granville Bantock – The Song of Liberty
- Frederick Delius – Violin Sonata No. 1
- Edward Elgar – "The Shower" and "The Fountain", SATB unacc., words by Henry Vaughan, Op. 71 Nos.1 and 2
- Herbert Howells – Piano Concerto No. 1
- Roger Quilter – A Children's Overture
- Ralph Vaughan Williams
  - The Lark Ascending (original version completed)
  - Symphony No. 2, A London Symphony

== Opera ==
- Rutland Boughton – The Immortal Hour (see Events)

== Musical theatre ==
- 4 November – Revival of The Earl and the Girl by Seymour Hicks, with lyrics by Percy Greenbank and music by Ivan Caryll, at the Aldwych Theatre.

== Births ==
- 11 March – William Lloyd Webber, organist and composer (died 1982)
- 24 May – Harry Parr Davies, composer and songwriter (died 1955)
- 23 August – Harold Truscott, composer, pianist, broadcaster and writer on music (died 1992)
- 14 December – Rosalyn Tureck, pianist (died 2003)

== Deaths ==
- 7 January – Patrick Weston Joyce, historian and musicologist, 86
- 23 July – Harry Evans, conductor and composer, 41
- 13 September – Robert Hope-Jones, inventor of the theatre organ, 55 (suicide)

== See also ==
- 1914 in the United Kingdom
