= Your King and Country Need You (Trevor) =

Cinch label for recording by Joseph Farrington.

Several different recruiting songs with the name "Your King and Country Want/Need You" were popularised in Britain at the beginning of the First World War. Your King and Country Need You with words by Huntley Trevor and music by Henry E. Pether was published at the start of the war as a recruiting song with the aim of persuading men to volunteer to enlist to fight in the War.

== Recordings ==
Below is a list of artists who have recorded the song, with record company (where known), and recording date (where known):

- Joseph Farrington, Cinch (His Master's Voice), 1914
- Leo Ryan on YouTube, Famous Record, c. 1914
- Harrison Latimer, Regal (G6795), c. 1914

== Online ==
- Sung by Leo Ryan on YouTube
