= Huntley Trevor =

English songwriter

Percy Huntley Trevor (born Percy William Favatt; 8 April 1881 – 17 April 1943) was an English songwriter. Generally known as Huntley Trevor, he sometimes published music under the pseudonyms Raymond Wallace, Chester Wallace, and Slade Williams.

== Career ==
Born in Bethnal Green, London, he began writing lyrics, especially for comic and novelty songs, before the First World War, and continued with some success until the 1930s. His most successful songs included "When It’s Apple Blossom Time In Normandy" (written with Harry Gifford and Tom Mellor, 1913); "Your King and Country Need You" (1914, written with Henry E. Pether); "Give Yourself a Pat on the Back" (1929, written with Ralph Butler); "Jolly Good Company" (1931), for which he wrote both words and music; "Old Father Thames" (1933, written with Lawrence Wright, who used the pseudonym "Betsy O'Hogan"); "You Can't Do That There 'Ere" (1935, written with Jack Rolls); and "With My Shillelagh Under My Arm" (1936, written with Billy O'Brien).

Trevor died in London in 1943, aged 62.
