= Herman Darewski =

British composer and conductor (1883–1947)

Darewski in 1916

Herman Darewski (17 April 1883 – 2 June 1947) was a British composer and conductor of theatrical music. His most successful work was perhaps The Better 'Ole, which ran for over 800 performances in its original London production in 1917. Some of his songs became very successful in musical revues.

Born in Minsk, and musically trained in Vienna, he worked in London, for the first 15 years of the new century as an in-house composer with Francis, Day and Hunter. By 1914 his songs were being used in musical revues.

After the war, he was unable to establish himself as a publisher and turned to conducting light music orchestras. By the mid-20s his established style of music was starting to sound increasingly outmoded. His last full show was staged in 1923. Following this he continued as a conductor in London and at English coastal resorts and had his own successful dance band for many years.

== Life and career ==
Darewski was born of Jewish background in Minsk, then part of the Russian Empire, where his father Eduard Darewski, a Polish singing professor, was working. The family moved to London, where Herman was educated. He studied at the London College of Music, where he distinguished himself as a piano student, passing examinations in record time. One of his brothers was the theatre producer Ernest C. Rolls, and his younger brother Max (1894–1929) followed him into the musical profession. Herman went to Vienna to study music, between 1897 and 1900.

He was engaged by the London music publishers Francis, Day and Hunter as one of their composing staff and remained with them for 15 years. There, he initially wrote instrumentals, from 1903 onwards, in the style of the then-current fads for ballroom cakewalks and syncopated ragtime. At Francis Day and Hunter, he had music hall variety song hits with "Au Revoir My Little Hyacinth" (1906), "In the Twi-Twi-Twilight" (1907), "I Used to Sigh for the Silv'ry Moon" (1909) and "Sue, Sue, Sue" (1909).

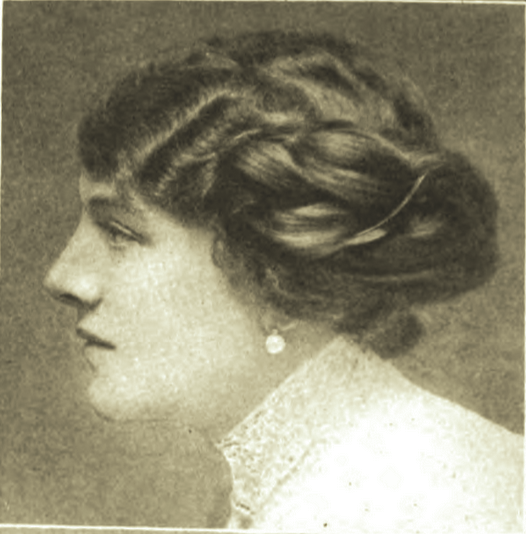
Madge Temple (1916)

In 1914, he visited Australia with his wife, the musical comedy actress Madge Temple, who was playing leading roles there. After his return to Britain during the First World War, Darewski combined administrative work for charities and prolific composition. He was one of the first British composers to compose for the new theatrical form, revue, writing, among others, Business as Usual and Push and Go for Albert de Courville, and The Better 'Ole and Carminetta for Charles B. Cochran. Among Darewski's songs are also "Sister Susie's Sewing Shirts for Soldiers", "The Big Brass Band", and "Ours is a Nice 'Ouse Ours Is." He also wrote songs for the London production of Phi-Phi.

After the war, a brief and unsuccessful attempt to strike out on his own as a publisher was followed by a new career as the conductor of light music orchestras. The Times wrote, "When British light orchestras were being ousted wholesale by foreign competition, he gave them new life, and was the precursor of men like Mr. Jack Hylton and Mr. Debroy Somers." Between 1924 and 1937 he was in charge of the music at the resorts of Bridlington and Blackpool, with an interval in 1930 to 1932 when he conducted at one of London's largest cinemas. He also led his own successful dance band for many years.

Darewski died in London at the age of 64.

== Stage works ==
- Business As Usual (revue), 1914, London
- All Scotch (revue), 1915, Newcastle and London
- Fads and Fancies (revue), 1915, London
- Joy-Land (revue), 1915, London
- Keep to the Right (revue), 1915, Boscombe
- Look Out (revue), 1915, Newport
- Made In England (revue), 1915, Clapham
- Merry Moments (revue), 1915, London
- Push and Go (revue), 1915, London
- Shell Out (revue), 1915, London
- Razzle Dazzle (revue), 1916, London
- Three Cheers (revue), 1916, London
- Carminetta (interpolations), 1917, London
- As You Were (revue), 1918, London
- Buzz-Buzz (revue), 1918, London
- Flora - musical comedy, 1918, London
- The Better 'Ole, 1918, London
- The Eclipse (revue), 1919, London
- Just Fancy (revue), 1920, London
- London, Paris and New York (revue), 1920, London
- Oh Julie! (musical comedy), 1920, London
- The Shop Girl (musical comedy - revised version), 1920, London
- A to Z (revue), 1922, London
- Listening In (revue), 1922, London
- Mayfair and Montmartre, 1922, London
- The Curate's Egg (revue), 1922, London
- Dover Street to Dixie, 1923, London
- The Little Revue, 1923, London
- The Nine O'Clock Revue, 1923, London

== Songs ==
- "Au Revoir My Little Hyacinth" (1906)
- "In The Twi-Twi-Twilight" (1907)
- "I Used to Sigh for the Silv'ry Moon" (1909)
- "Sue, Sue, Sue" (1909)
- "Sister Susie's Sewing Shirts for Soldiers" (1914)
- "When We've Wound Up the Watch on the Rhine" (1914)
- "If You Could Care" (1918)
