= Danzas fantásticas =

Work for solo piano by Joaquín Turina

Danzas fantásticas, Op. 22, is the best known work by the Spanish composer Joaquín Turina. It was written in 1919 (11-29 August), originally for solo piano, and later orchestrated. However, the orchestral version was the first to be performed, and this has been the cause of some confusion in reference works.

The title of the work is sometimes translated as Fantasy Dances, but more often as Fantastic Dances.

== Structure ==
The work was inspired by the novel La orgía by José Más, and quotations from the novel were printed on the score at the start of each dance:

1. Exaltación, a jota from Aragon
  Parecía como si las figuras de aquel cuadro incomparable se movieran dentro del cáliz de uno flor.
  It seemed as though the figures in that incomparable picture were moving inside the calyx of a flower.
2. Ensueño, a Basque zortziko in 5/8 time
  Las cuerdas de la guitarra, al sonar, eran como lamentos de un alma que no pudiera más con el peso de la amargura.
  The guitar's strings sounded the lament of a soul helpless under the weight of bitterness.
3. Orgía, an Andalusian farruca
  El perfume de las flores se confundía con el olor de la manzanilla, y del fondo de las estrechas copas, llenas del vino incomparable, como un incienso, se elevaba la alegría.
  The perfume of the flowers merged with the odor of manzanilla, and from the bottom of raised glasses, full of the incomparable wine, like an incense, rose joy.

The Danzas fantásticas were written in their original form for piano solo 11–29 August 1919. Turina orchestrated the work between 15 September and 30 December 1919. The orchestral version was first heard on 13 February 1920, in the Teatro Price in Madrid; the Orquesta Filarmónica de Madrid was conducted by Bartolomé Pérez Casas. The composer himself first presented the piano solo version on 15 June 1920, at the Málaga Sociedad Filarmónica.

The work was dedicated to Turina's wife, Obdulia Garzón.

== Recordings ==
=== Piano ===
- Turina, J.: Piano Music, Vol. 1 - Fantastic Dances / Gypsy Dances / 3 Andalusian Dances - Jordi Masó - Naxos 8.557150

=== Orchestral ===
- Turina - Danzas Fantásticas (Danzas fantásticas, La procesión del Rocío, Sinfonía sevillana, and Ritmos) - Bamberger Symphoniker - Antonio de Almeida, conductor - RCA 09026 60895 2
- Turina - Sinfonia sevillana / Danzas fantasticas / Ritmos - Castile and Leon Symphony Orchestra - Max Bragado-Darman, conductor - Naxos 8.555955
