= Jardín de Oriente =

- Opera by Joaquín Turina
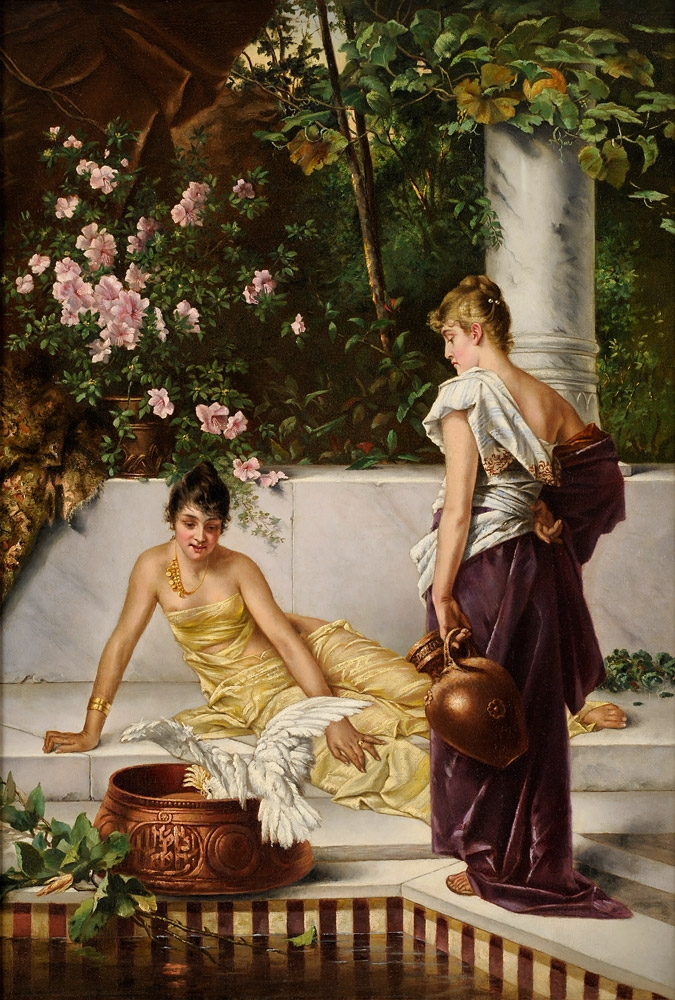
- 19th-century depiction of odalisques in a sultan's garden, the setting of Jardín de Oriente
- Librettist: Gregorio Martínez Sierra; María Lejárraga
- Premiere: 6 March 1923; Teatro Real, Madrid

Jardín de Oriente (Garden of the Orient) is an opera in one act composed by Joaquín Turina to a Spanish-language libretto by Gregorio Martínez Sierra and his wife María Lejárraga. It premiered at the Teatro Real in Madrid on 6 March 1923. The story is set in the palace and gardens of a North African sultan and recounts the love story between one of the sultan's wives and the man who defeats him in battle.

== Background and performance history ==
Jardín de Oriente was the third of Turina's three operas, and the second to be staged. (Note: Turina's first opera, La sulamita ("The Shulamite"), was composed circa 1897 to a libretto by Pedro Balgañón but has never been staged.) Gregorio Martínez Sierra had also written the libretto for Turina's second opera Margot, and although his wife was not credited on the printed libretto for Margot, she had a significant input on that as well, particularly on the depiction of the female characters.

Turina began the composition of Jardin on 1 March 1922 and finished it in October 1922, with the final orchestration completed on 24 January 1923. The opera premiered at the Teatro Real in Madrid the following March in a production designed by José Olalla with the orchestra conducted by Arturo Saco del Valle. The work has only been rarely performed since then. There was a fully staged revival at the Teatro de la Zarzuela in Madrid in 1982 to mark the 100th anniversary of Turina's birth, and a performance in concert version at the Auditorio Nacional in Madrid in 1999 marking the 50th anniversary of Turina's death.

There is no complete recording of the opera but Turina's piano transcription of the dance ("La Danza") has been recorded by Albert Guinovart for Harmonia Mundi (1996) and Antonio Soria for Edicions Albert Moraleda (1998).

== Roles ==
Role	Voice type	Premiere cast, 6 March 1923 Conductor: Arturo Saco del Valle
Galiana, one of the sultan's wives	soprano	Matilde Revenga
Zaida, one of the sultan's wives	contralto	Ramona Galán
Celinda, one of the sultan's wives	soprano	Manolita Guardiola
Omar, the sultan's enemy	baritone	Francisco Izal
Hassán, Omar's servant	tenor	Jaime Ferré
El genio de la fuente, Spirit of the fountain	soprano	Graciela Fernán de Vergar
Sultan	speaking role	
The sultan's wives and dancers, Moors, the sultan and Omar's soldiers
