= Symphony No. 2 (Enescu) =

Symphony composed by George Enescu

- by George Enescu
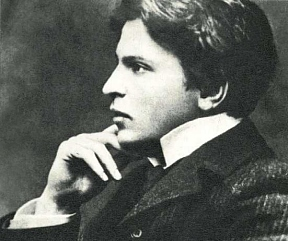
- George Enesco in the 1910s
- Key: A major
- Opus: 17
- Composed: 1912–14
- Performed: 15 March 1915 Athenaeum, Bucharest
- Duration: 55 min.
- Movements: 3

Symphony No. 2, Op. 17, in A major by the Romanian composer George Enescu was written in 1912–14. A performance lasts about 55 minutes.

== History ==
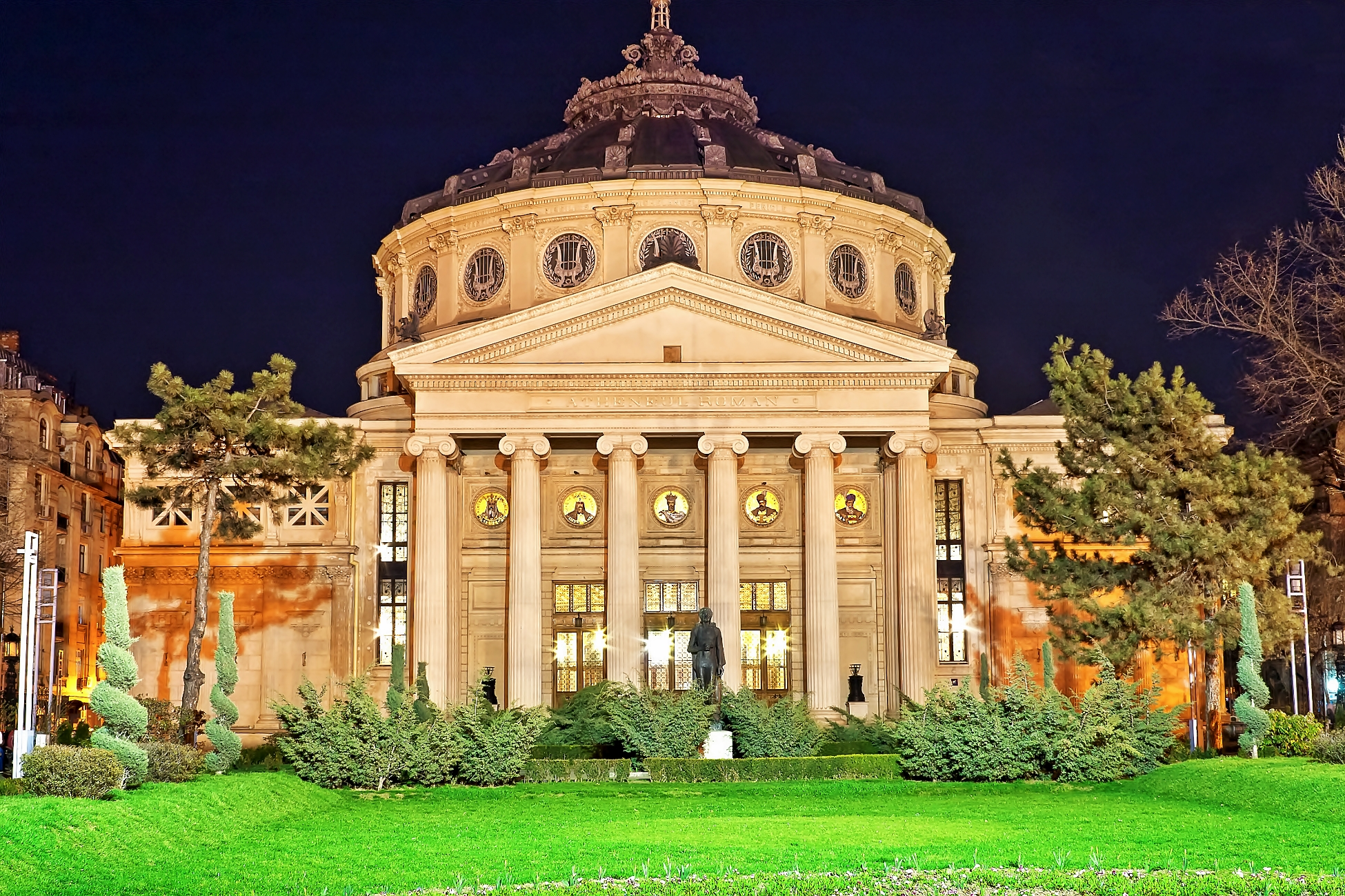
The Romanian Athenaeum, Bucharest, where Enescu premiered the Second Symphony

Enescu began writing his Second Symphony late in 1912, and the manuscript score specifies the date of completion on 18 November 1914. The composer conducted its premiere by the Orchestra of the Ministry of Public Education at the Athenaeum in Bucharest on 15 March (Old Style = 29 March New Style) 1915. Enescu was not satisfied with the result, and set aside the manuscript, which was not performed again until Iosif Conta revived the symphony in 1961, six years after the composer's death.

At the height of the First World War, in the summer of 1917, the Romanian government sent their gold reserves by train to Moscow, along with a large collection of Enescu's manuscripts, including the only copy of the Second Symphony and all of the sketches for the opera Œdipe. The crate containing Enescu's documents arrived in Moscow, but promptly disappeared. It was only recovered thanks to the intervention of Bruno Walter in 1924, and eventually was returned to Enescu in Paris. Though he remarked in 1952 that it was "far from being finished", and intended an extensive revision of it, other commitments prevented him from doing so.

The score was first published only in 1965 by Éditions Salabert, Paris. Although the published score does not bear any dedication, there is reason to suppose that Enescu intended dedicating the work to the memory of Édouard Colonne.

== Instrumentation ==
The symphony is scored for 3 flutes (third doubling piccolo), 2 oboes, English horn, 3 clarinets (third doubling bass clarinet and piccolo clarinet in D), 3 bassoons, 4 horns, 3 trumpets in C, 3 trombones, tuba, timpani, triangle, bass drum, tomtoms, snare drum, cymbals, castanets, tam-tam, tambourine, glockenspiel, celesta, piano and harmonium, harp (or several, ad. lib.), strings (20, 20, 14, 12, 12).

== Analysis ==
The symphony falls into three movements:

1. Vivace, ma non troppo
2. Andante giusto
3. Un poco lento, marziale – Allegro vivace, marziale

The symphony owes a clear debt to Richard Strauss, evident on the surface in Ein Heldenleben-like opening gesture, but also found in the kaleidoscopically shifting chromatic harmonies, recalling the admiration Enescu expressed in 1912 and 1915 for Elektra and Salome.

The first movement is in the usual sonata-allegro form, though the first thematic group adds five independent auxiliary motives not derivable from the long main theme itself, which is launched without any introduction at the beginning of the movement. The second thematic group introduces an entirely new atmosphere, but in fact is entirely derived from the motives of the first group. It is followed by a bridge passage which, in addition to manipulating four motives from the main themes, introduces a new one, which will become important throughout the rest of the symphony. After a comparatively short development, the recapitulation condenses and juxtaposes the material of the exposition, including the bridge theme.

The second movement, though imbued with the character of an extended Lied, unexpectedly proves to be in sonata-allegro form, like the outer movements. In contrast to the first movement, however, the development here is unusually extensive. The recapitulation, on the other hand, is much shorter than the exposition, and the movement concludes with an autumnal coda.

Intensely concerned with timbre, the finale weaves together constantly shifting, overlapping, and dissolving shades and gradations of instrumental colour. It opens with a long introduction in slow tempo, featuring a theme that anticipates the style of Paul Hindemith. The main body of the movement, like its two predecessors, is in sonata-allegro form, with an extended coda nearly three times as long as the recapitulation.

== Discography ==
- George Enescu: Symphony No. 2. Orchestra Simfonica a Cinematografiei, Constantin Bugeanu, cond. LP recording, 1 disc: 33⅓ rpm, 12 in., monaural. Electrecord ECE 0365. Bucharest: Electrecord, 1968.
- Enescu: Symphony No. 2 in A Major, Op. 17; Vox maris, Op. 31. Filarmonică de Stat George Enescu, Horia Andreescu, cond.; Orchestra and Chorus of the Iasy Moldova Philharmonic, Ion Baciu, cond. CD recording, 1 disc: digital, 12 cm., stereo.. S.l.: Pacific Music, 1988. Also issued on HNH 8.223142, Hong Kong: HNH International, 1988. Also issued on Marco Polo 8.223142. S.l.: Marco Polo. 1988. Reissued as streaming audio, Naxos Music Library, 2004.
- George Enescu: Complete Orchestral Works, Vol. 2. Symphony No. 2, Op. 17; Romanian Rhapsody No. 1, Op. 11, No. 1; Rhapsody No. 2, Op. 11, No. 2. Orchestra Simfonică a Radioteleviziunii, Horia Andreescu, cond. Recorded at the Radio Concert Hall, Bucharest, in July 1993. CD recording, 1 disc: digital, 12 cm., stereo. Olympia OCD 442. Olympia Explorer Series. London: Olympia Compact Discs, 1994.
- George Enescu: Orchestral Works, Vol. 5. Philharmonia Moldova; Alexandru Lascae, conductor. Recorded 16–25 June 1994, Concerthall of the Philharmonic Orchestra of Moldava, Iași (Romania). CD recording, 1 disc: digital, stereo. Ottavo OTR C69450. The Hague, The Netherlands: Ottavo Recordings, 1996.
- "George Enescu" Bucharest Philharmonic Orchestra; Cristian Mandeal, cond. (With Romanian Rhapsody No. 2). Recorded 20–24 June 1994, Romanian Atheneum Hall, Bucharest. CD recording, 1 disc: digital, stereo. Arte Nova Classics 74321 34035 2. Germany: Arte Nova, 1996. Reissued, [U.S.A.]: Arte Nova Classics, 2007.
- Georges Enesco: Symphonies 1 et 2. Orchestre Philharmonique de Monte-Carlo, Lawrence Foster, cond. EMI Classics CDC 7 54763 2 (0777 7 54763 2) [S.l.]: EMI France, 1993. Reissued as disc 1 of George Enescu: Three Symphonies; Violin Sonata No. 3, with Chœur de Chambre Les Éléments; Orchestre National de Lyon, Lawrence Foster, cond. Valery Sokolov, violin; Svetlana Kosenko, piano. CD recording, 2 discs: digital, 12 cm, stereo. Warner Classics 50999 6 78393 2 2. [UK]: Warner Music UK Ltd, 2012.
- BBC Philharmonic Orchestra, Gennady Rozhdestvensky, cond. With George Enescu: Romanian Rhapsody No. 2. Recorded 1995 und 1996. Colchester: Chandos Records, 1997. Also issued Munich: Koch International, 1997.
- George Enescu: Symphony No. 2, Op. 17; Chamber Symphony, Op 33. Tampere Philharmonic Orchestra, Hannu Lintu, cond. Recorded at Tampere Hall, 24 August 2011 (Chamber Symphony); 3–5 January 2012 (Symphony No. 2). CD recording, 1 disc: digital, 12 cm, stereo. Ondine ODE 1196–2. Helsinki: Ondine Oy, 2012.
