= Joaquín Turina =

Spanish composer (1882–1949)

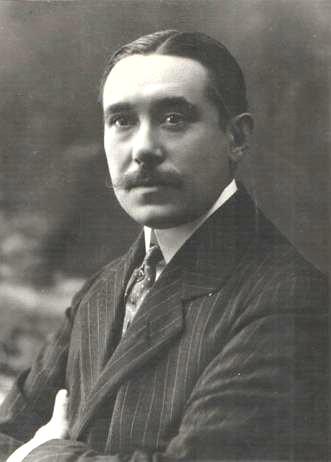
- Turina in 1914
- Born: 9 December 1882; Seville, Spain
- Died: 14 January 1949 (aged 66); Madrid, Spain
- Occupation: Composer

Joaquín Turina Pérez (9 December 1882 – 14 January 1949) was a Spanish composer of classical music.

== Biography ==
Turina was born in Seville. He studied in Seville as well as in Madrid. He lived in Paris from 1905 to 1914 where he took composition lessons from Vincent d'Indy at the Schola Cantorum de Paris and studied the piano under Moritz Moszkowski. Like his countryman and friend, Manuel de Falla, while in Paris he familiarized himself with the impressionist composers Maurice Ravel and Claude Debussy, whose music had a profound influence on his compositional practice.

On 10 December 1908 he married Obdulia Garzón and together they had five children. She was the dedicatee of the Danzas fantásticas, which he completed in 1919.

Along with Falla, he returned to Madrid in 1914, working as a composer, teacher and critic. On 28 March 1916, he joined the Madrid Symphony Orchestra at the Hotel Ritz of Madrid to perform the premiere of Falla's revised orchestral version of El amor brujo. In the early months of 1929, he visited Havana, Cuba, where he gave a series of seven lectures at the Hispanic-Cuban Institute of Culture.

In 1931 he was made professor of composition at the Madrid Royal Conservatory. Among his notable pupils were Vicente Asencio and Celedonio Romero. He died in Madrid in 1949.

== Works ==
See: List of compositions by Joaquín Turina

His works include the operas Margot (1914) and Jardín de Oriente (1923), the Danzas fantásticas (1919, versions for piano and orchestra), La oración del torero (written first for a lute quartet, then string quartet, then string orchestra), chamber music, piano works, guitar pieces and songs. Much of his work shows the influence of traditional Andalusian music. He also wrote a short one-movement Rapsodia sinfónica (1931) for piano and orchestra. His music often conveys a feeling of rapture or exaltation. His guitar works include Fandanguillo and Hommage à Tárrega, which were written for Andrés Segovia. The dedicatee and/or first performer of a number of his piano works was José Cubiles.

During the 1920s and 1930s, he frequently visited Barcelona and Catalonia and interacted with various Catalan artists, critics and intellectuals, such as Manuel Clausells, Joan Lamote de Grignon, Eugenio d'Ors, Oleguer Junyent, Frank Marshall, Rafael Moragas, Jaime Pahissa, and Santiago Rusiñol. He also collaborated with various musical institutions, such as the Associació Música da Camera, the Barcelona Municipal Band or the Pau Casals Orchestra. As a result of this relationship, he composed Evocaciones, a set of three pieces for piano that become a tribute to Catalonia and that include a sardana. On 23 October 1928, together with Pablo Casals, he premiered the transcription for a cello and piano «Jueves Santo a medianoche» (from the Seville suite) at the Palau de la Música Catalana.

== The gender controversy ==
In 1914, Turina published an essay on feminism in music in which he denounced the increasing numbers of women participating in composition. While praising performers such as Wanda Landowska and Teresa Carreño, he declared that composition should be a region forbidden to women, whose compositions were of pretentious but banal complexity (contornos banales). He went so far as to suggest that the process of composition involved masculinising the female brain, and asked if these composers are really women. As Lerena points out, his comparison of women's composition to lace-making invokes the traditional female crafts that were the only ways in which women could express a creativity aligned with Modernist aestheticism.
