= Follow the Crowd (song) =

Song

from the album The Queen of the Movies
- Released: 1914
- Songwriter(s): Irving Berlin

Berlin sings Follow the Crowd

"Follow the Crowd" is a song composed by Irving Berlin for the 1914 musical The Queen of the Movies when it was introduced by Frank Moulan.
