= Margot (opera) =

Opera composed by Joaquín Turina

- Opera by Joaquín Turina
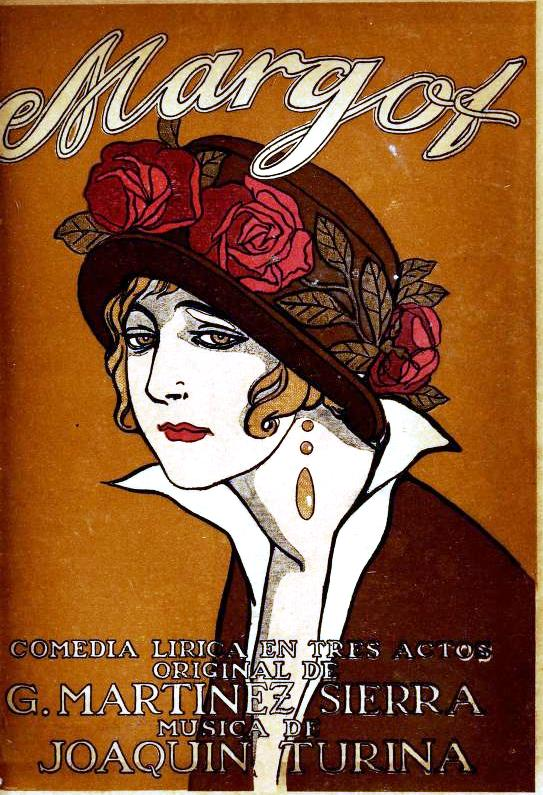
- Libretto cover, 1914
- Librettist: María Lejárraga
- Premiere: 10 October 1914; Teatro de la Zarzuela, Madrid

Margot is an opera in three acts (later reduced to two) composed by Joaquín Turina to a Spanish-language libretto by María Martínez Sierra. It premiered at the Teatro de la Zarzuela in Madrid on 10 October 1914. Set in Paris and Seville, the opera's story involves a love triangle between José Manuel, a young Spaniard; Margot, a Parisian courtesan with whom he has an affair; and Amparo, José Manuel's sweetheart in Andalucía.

== Background and performance history ==
Margot was the second of Turina's three operas, and the first to be staged. (Note: Turina's first opera, La sulamita ("The Shulamite"), was composed circa 1897 to a libretto by Pedro Balgañón but has never been staged.) He began its composition on 24 June 1914 and finished the orchestration on 27 September, less than three weeks before the opera's premiere. His librettist, María Lejárraga (writing as was customary for her, under the name of her husband Gregorio Martínez Sierra) had recently written the libretto for José María Usandizaga's Las golondrinas ("The Swallows"), which had premiered in Madrid in February 1914. She would later write the libretto for Turina's third opera, Jardín de oriente ("Oriental Garden").

Margot premiered on 10 October 1914 at the Teatro de la Zarzuela in Madrid in a production directed by Francisco Meana with sets by Luis Muriel. The critical (and audience) reception at the premiere was mixed. While there was praise for Turina's score, the subject matter was considered "vulgar" and the libretto "unfortunate" and "lacking in originality". The work had a more positive reception in its subsequent performances the following year in Zaragoza and Seville. In June–July 1916, it was performed at the Teatro Victoria in Buenos Aires and the Teatro Urquiza in Montevideo, but received no further performances until 1999, the 50th anniversary of Turina's death, when the opera was performed in a concert version at the Gran Teatro in Córdoba on 14 September and replicated the following day at the Teatro de la Maestranza in Seville. A further concert revival took place in Madrid in March 2000 at the Teatro Monumental with largely the same cast as the 1999 performances in Córdoba and Seville.

A critical edition of the score using Turina's revised two-act version was prepared by Juan de Udaeta, the conductor of the 1999 revivals, and published in 2001. Although the opera itself has languished in obscurity, the Act 2 music for the Holy Thursday scene ("Plazoleta de Sevilla en la noche del Jueves Santo"), re-orchestrated as a march, has become a popular piece during the processions of Holy Week in Seville.

== Principal roles ==
Role	Voice type	Premiere cast, 10 October 1914 Conductor: Pablo Luna
Margot	soprano	María Marco
Amparo	mezzo-soprano	Rafaela Leonís
José Manuel	baritone	José Parera
Lily		Rafaela G. de Haro
Celia		Ramona Nieto
Anatolio		Sr. Morales
gentlemen, vendors, penitents, guards, Gypsies, children, etc

== Recordings ==
Although there are no complete studio recordings of Margot, the concert versions presented in Seville (1999) and Madrid (2000) were recorded for broadcast by Radio Nacional de España and Televisión Española respectively. The Spanish pianist Antonio Soria recorded Turina's piano transcriptions of two pieces from the opera ("El triunfo de Afrodita" and "Plazoleta de Sevilla en la noche del Jueves Santo") in 1998 for Edicions Albert Moraleda.
