= Sister Susie's Sewing Shirts for Soldiers =

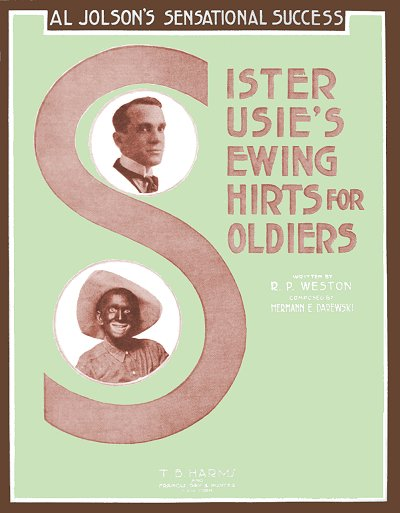
- Sheet music cover

Song
- Published: 1914
- Composer(s): Herman Darewski
- Lyricist(s): R.P. Weston

"Sister Susie's Sewing Shirts for Soldiers" is a World War I-era song that tells about a young girl sewing shirts for soldiers fighting abroad. Her efforts are in vain however, as "Some soldiers send epistles, say they'd sooner sleep in thistles, than the saucy soft short shirts for soldiers sister Susie sews."

Herman Darewski composed the music, with lyrics by R.P. Weston. Both Billy Murray and Al Jolson sang early versions of the song, which was published by T. B. Harms & Francis and Day & Hunter in 1914. Each verse was meant to be sung faster than the last, which presented issues for soldiers who had consumed large quantities of beer.

== Lyrics ==
Sister Susie's Sewing Shirts For Soldiers
Sister Susie's sewing in the kitchen on a "Singer",
There's miles and miles of flannel on the floor
And up the stairs,
And father says it's rotten getting mixed up with the cotton,
And sitting on the needles that she leaves upon the chairs.

And should you knock at our street door
Ma whispers, "Come inside."
Then when you ask where Susie is,
She says with loving pride:

(fast)
"Sister Susie's sewing shirts for soldiers
Such skill at sewing shirts
Our shy young sister Susie shows!

Some soldiers send epistles,
Say they'd sooner sleep in thistles
Than the saucy, soft, short shirts for soldiers sister Susie sews."

Piles and piles and piles of shirts she sends out to the soldiers,
And sailors won't be jealous when they see them,
Not at all.
And when we say her stitching will set all the soldiers itching,
She says our soldiers fight best when their back's against the wall.

And little brother Gussie, he who lisps when he says "yes",
Says "Where's the cotton gone from off my kite?
Oh, I can gueth!"

(faster)
REPEAT CHORUS

I forgot to tell you that our sister Susie's married,
And when she isn't sewing shirts
She's sewing other things.
Then little sister Molly says,
"Oh, sister's bought a dolly.
She's making all the clothes for it
With pretty bows and strings."

Says Susie:
"Don't be silly"
As she blushes and she sighs.
Then mother smiles and whispers with a twinkle in her eyes:
(fastest)
REPEAT CHORUS

== Sequels ==
Another tongue-twisting song from the Great War makes reference to "Sister Susie". Entitled "I Saw Six Short Soldiers Scrubbing Six Short Shirts" and composed by Herman Darewski, its lyrics are as follows:-

You've heard of Sister Susie who's been sewing shirts for soldiers,
In company with lots of other wenches.
Those shirts have come in handy to our boys somewhere in France,
They've kept them warm and cosy in the trenches.
I lately paid a visit to the fellows at the front.
It was washing day the day that I got there.
I've seen those soldiers drilling and I've seen them working too,
But the way I saw them washing made me stare.

I saw six short soldiers scrubbing six short shirts,
Six short soldiers scrubbed and scrubbed, six short shirts were rubbed and rubbed.
Six short soldiers sang this song, their singing surely showed
Those six short soldiers scrubbed six short shirts Sister Susie sewed.

Those soldiers sang of Sister Susie sewing shirts for soldiers
While shot and shell accompanied their singing
The shrapnel burst above them, but they simply scrubbed away
The soap suds all around them they were flinging.
Said I, "those shirts seem short but I suppose they've simply shrunk"
One said "these shirts have shrunk, well I should smile"
Another said, "we're glad they're short because we're short of soap
So I stood there watching them for quite a while.

A recording of "I Saw Six Short Soldiers Scrubbing Six Short Shirts" by Jay Laurier appears on volume 2 of "Oh! It's A Lovely War - Songs & Sketches Of The Great War 1914-1918"

This rendering by Ewart Alan Mackintosh gets closer to the reality of war:

Sniper Sandy

( Sergeant Alexander Macdonald, killed in action at Beaumont Hamel, November 18th 1916)

Sandy Mac the sniper is a sniping from his loop-hole,
With a telescopic rifle he is looking for a Hun.
If he sees a sniper lurking, or a working party working,
At once he opens fire on them and bags them every one.
And when you come into our trench by night-time or by day,
We take you to his loop-hole, and we point to him and say-

Chorus
“Sniper Sandy’s slaying Saxon soldiers,
And Saxon soldiers seldom show but Sandy slays a few,
And every day the Bosches put up little wooden crosses
In the cemetery for Saxon soldiers Sniper Sandy slew.”

Now in the German trenches there’s a sniper they call Hermann,
A Stout and stolid Saxon with a healthy growth of beard,
And Hermann with is rifle is the pride of every German,
Until our Sandy gets on him and Hermann gets afeared,
For when he hears the bullets come he slides down to the ground,
And tremblingly he gasps out to his comrades all around-

Chorus
The Seaforths got so proud of Sandy’s prowess with his rifle,
They drew up a report on him and sent it to the Corps,
And ninety-seven was his bag-it doesn’t seem a trifle-
But Sandy isn’t certain that it wasn’t rather more,
And when Sir John French heard of it, he broke into a laugh,
And rubbed his hands and chuckled to the Chief of General Staff-

Chorus
